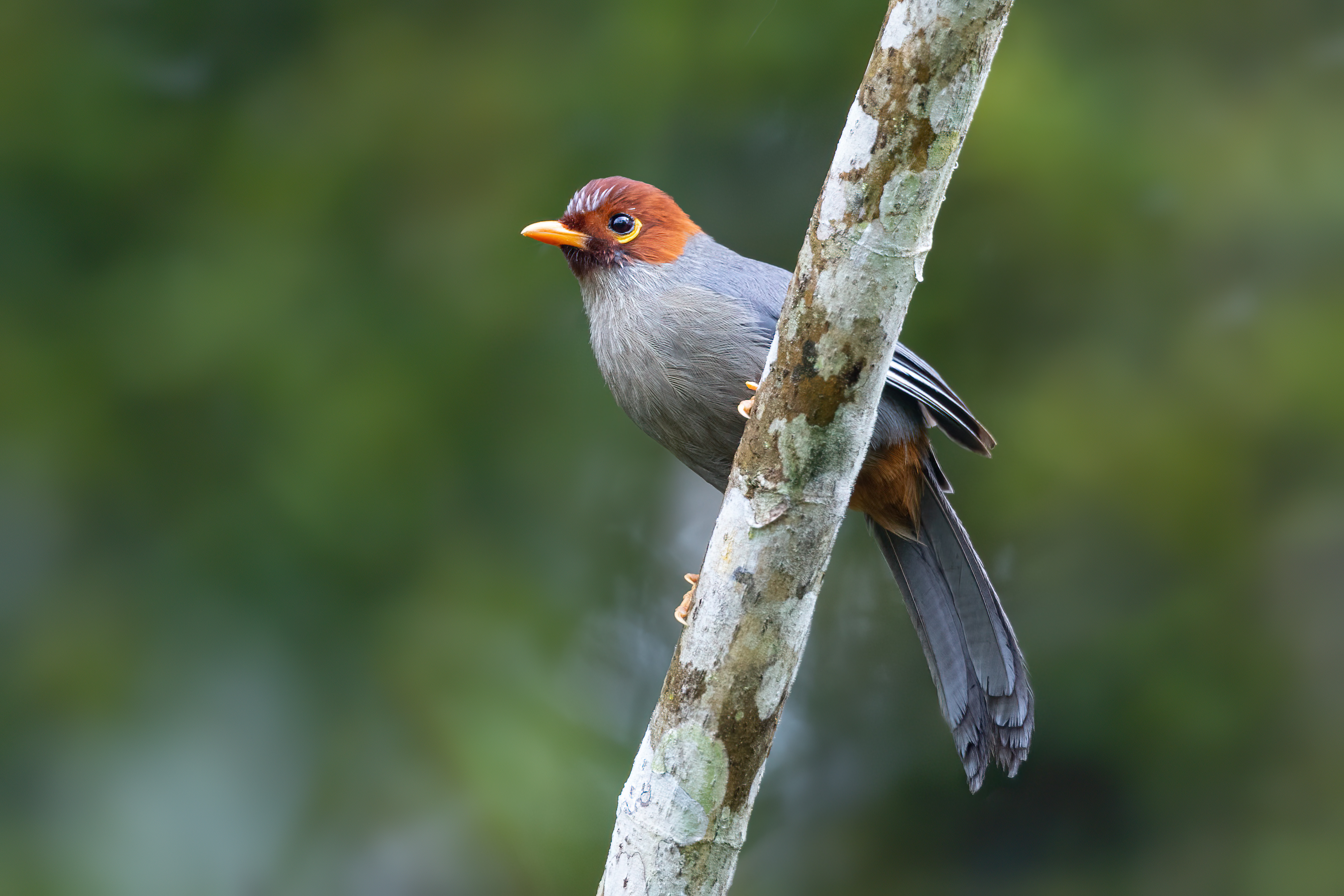

Conservation status
- Least Concern (IUCN 3.1)

Scientific classification
- Kingdom: Animalia
- Phylum: Chordata
- Class: Aves
- Order: Passeriformes
- Family: Leiothrichidae
- Genus: Pterorhinus
- Species: P. treacheri

Binomial name
- Pterorhinus treacheri (Sharpe, 1879)

Synonyms
- Ianthocincla treacheri Sharpe, 1879; Rhinocichla treacheri (Sharpe, 1879); Garrulax treacheri (Sharpe, 1879)

= Chestnut-hooded laughingthrush =

Species of bird endemic to Borneo

The chestnut-hooded laughingthrush (Pterorhinus treacheri) is a species of bird in the laughingthrush family Leiothrichidae endemic to Borneo. Described by the British ornithologist Richard Bowdler Sharpe as a distinct species in 1879, it was subsequently considered a subspecies of the chestnut-capped laughingthrush until 2007, when it was again raised to species status by the ornithologists Nigel Collar and Craig Robson. It is 22–24 cm (8.7–9.4 in) long, with a chestnut brown head and chin, with grey feathering on the top of the head. The upperparts and the side of the neck are slaty-grey, with a long white wing patch. The throat, breast, and upper belly are dull yellowish-brown, with purer grey flanks and a reddish-brown vent, lower belly, and thighs. It has a yellow half eye-ring behind and below the eye, while the tail has a blackish tip. Both sexes look similar, while juveniles are duller than adults.

The species inhabits montane and hill forest, forest edge, disturbed vegetation, and cultivated areas in mountains in the north-central and southeastern parts of Borneo. It is mainly found at elevations of 600–2,800 m (2,000–9,200 ft), but can be found down to 200 m (660 ft) and as high as 3,350 m (10,990 ft). It is omnivorous, feeding on arthropods, fruit, and flowers. Breeding occurs from February to April and in October, with the species building cup nests and laying clutches of two bright blue to greenish-blue eggs. It is classified as being of least concern by the International Union for Conservation of Nature due to its very large range, fairly large population, and a lack of significant population decline, but its numbers are thought to be decreasing and it is threatened by habitat destruction and habitat fragmentation.

== Taxonomy and systematics ==
The chestnut-hooded laughingthrush was originally described in 1879 as Ianthocincla treacheri by the British ornithologist Richard Bowdler Sharpe on the basis of specimens from Mount Kinabalu in Borneo. Sharpe later moved it to the genus Rhinocichla in 1883. It was subsequently considered a subspecies of the chestnut-capped laughingthrush and moved into the genus Garrulax as part of that species. In 2007, the ornithologists Nigel Collar and Craig Robson restored the chestnut-hooded laughingthrush to full species status. Following the publication of a comprehensive molecular phylogenetic study in 2018, it was moved to the resurrected genus Pterorhinus.

The name of the genus, Pterorhinus, is derived from the Ancient Greek words pteron (feather) and rhinos (nostril). The specific name treacheri refers to William Hood Treacher, a British colonial administrator who was the Governor of the British colony of North Borneo. "Chestnut-hooded laughingthrush" is the official common name designated by the International Ornithologists' Union (IOU).

The chestnut-hooded laughingthrush is one of 133 species recognised by the IOU in the laughingthrush family Leiothrichidae, a diverse group of birds found across Africa, Western, South, and Southeast Asia, and China. Within the family, it is one of 23 species currently classified in the genus Pterorhinus. A 2019 phylogeny by Tianlong Cai and colleagues found the chestnut-hooded laughingthrush to be most closely related to the chestnut-capped laughingthrush. These two species were sister (most closely related) to a clade (group of organisms descending from a common ancestor) formed by the rufous-necked, chestnut-backed, and black-throated laughingthrushes.

=== Subspecies ===
There are currently three recognised subspecies of the chestnut-hooded laughingthrush. The subspecies that inhabits western and southeastern Borneo is undescribed.

- P. t. treacheri (Sharpe, 1879): The nominate subspecies, it is found in northern Borneo.
- P. t. damnatus (Harrisson & Hartley, 1934): It is found in north-central Borneo.
- P. t. griswoldi (Peters, JL, 1940): It is found in central Borneo.

== Description ==
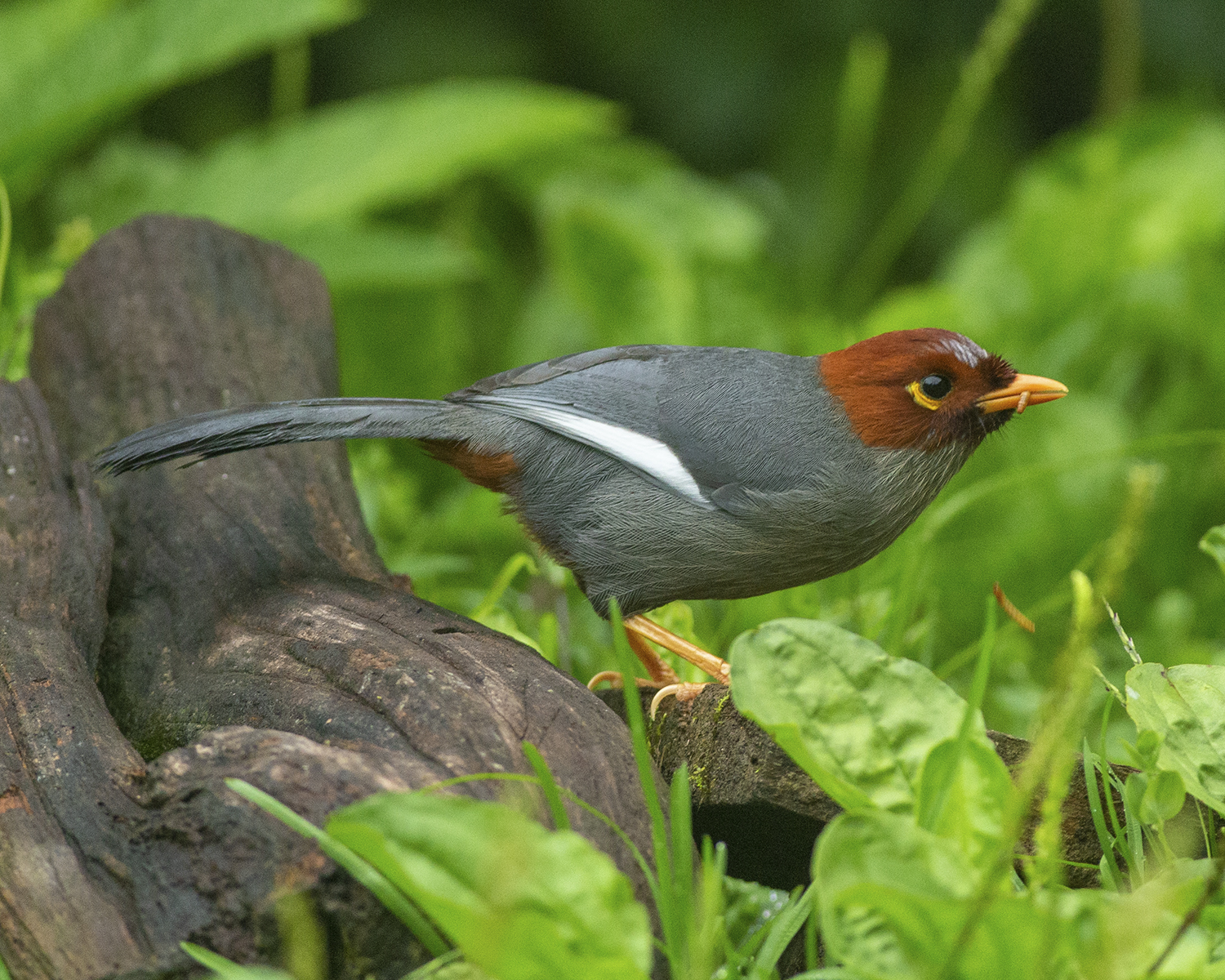
A chestnut-hooded laughingthrush foraging for insects.

The chestnut-hooded laughingthrush is 22–24 cm (8.7–9.4 in) long, with both sexes having similar appearances. In the nominate subspecies, the chin, lores (area between the eyes and nostrils), supercilium (line above the eye), feathers around the nostrils, and the area around the base of the bill are chestnut brown. The forehead, front of the crown (top of the head), and the area from the eyes down to the chin are darker, with some greyish-white feathering on the crown. The throat, breast, and upper belly are dull yellowish-brown with a greyish tinge and dull yellowish-brown streaking. The flanks are purer grey, while the lower belly, thighs, and vent are reddish-brown. The side of the neck and the upperparts are slaty-grey with a slight yellowish-brown tinge, with a long white patch on the primaries. The tail is darker grey and has a blackish tip. The iris is red to reddish-brown, with a yellow half eye-ring behind and below the eye. The bill is dull orange to yellowish-brown, while the legs are yellowish.

Juveniles are duller than adults. P. t. damnatus has a duller breast with less streaking, while P. t. griswoldi has more intense chestnut on the vent. The species differs from the chestnut-capped laughingthrush by the feathering on the nostrils, its yellow (instead of white) eye-ring that is only present behind and below the eye, chestnut brown chin, greyer upperparts, paler underparts, and greyer feathers on the crown. The undescribed subspecies from western and southeastern Borneo differs from the three known subspecies in the colour of its underparts (peachy-buff instead of buff-grey), the presence of white markings below the eye, and the absence of streaking on the chest.

=== Vocalisations ===
The song of the chestnut-hooded laughingthrush is a fluty, high-pitched chu-wu, chwi-wi-wi-wi-wiee-wiu-wu with rather clicky starting notes or a rising and falling wiu-wu-wu-wi-wi-wee-wu. It also makes an even-pitched series of up to 12 wi notes, a wu-tuwu-tuwu, or a ri'-ri'-ri, all of which are punctuated with a to-we-oh to-we-oh. Its call is a harsh, hoarse churr, while the contact call is a soft, descending ah-ah-ah-ah, with the latter notes also given singly.

== Distribution and habitat ==
The chestnut-hooded laughingthrush is endemic to Borneo, where it is found in the north-central mountain ranges from Mount Kinabalu to Barito Ulu, along with the Meratus Mountains in the southeast of the island. It inhabits evergreen montane forest and hill forest, forest edge, secondary forest, disturbed vegetation, and cultivated areas such as short growth in old rice fields. It is usually found at elevations of 600–2,800 m (2,000–9,200 ft), but may sometimes be seen as low as 200 m (660 ft) and as high as 3,350 m (10,990 ft).

== Behaviour and ecology ==
The chestnut-hooded laughingthrush forages in small groups of 4–5 birds, frequently joining mixed-species foraging flocks that can include the Sunda cuckooshrike, Sunda laughingthrush, Whitehead's broadbill, and Whitehead's trogon. These flocks can include Tupaia treeshrews and Dremomys squirrels on the ground and Sundasciurus squirrels in the canopy.

=== Feeding ===
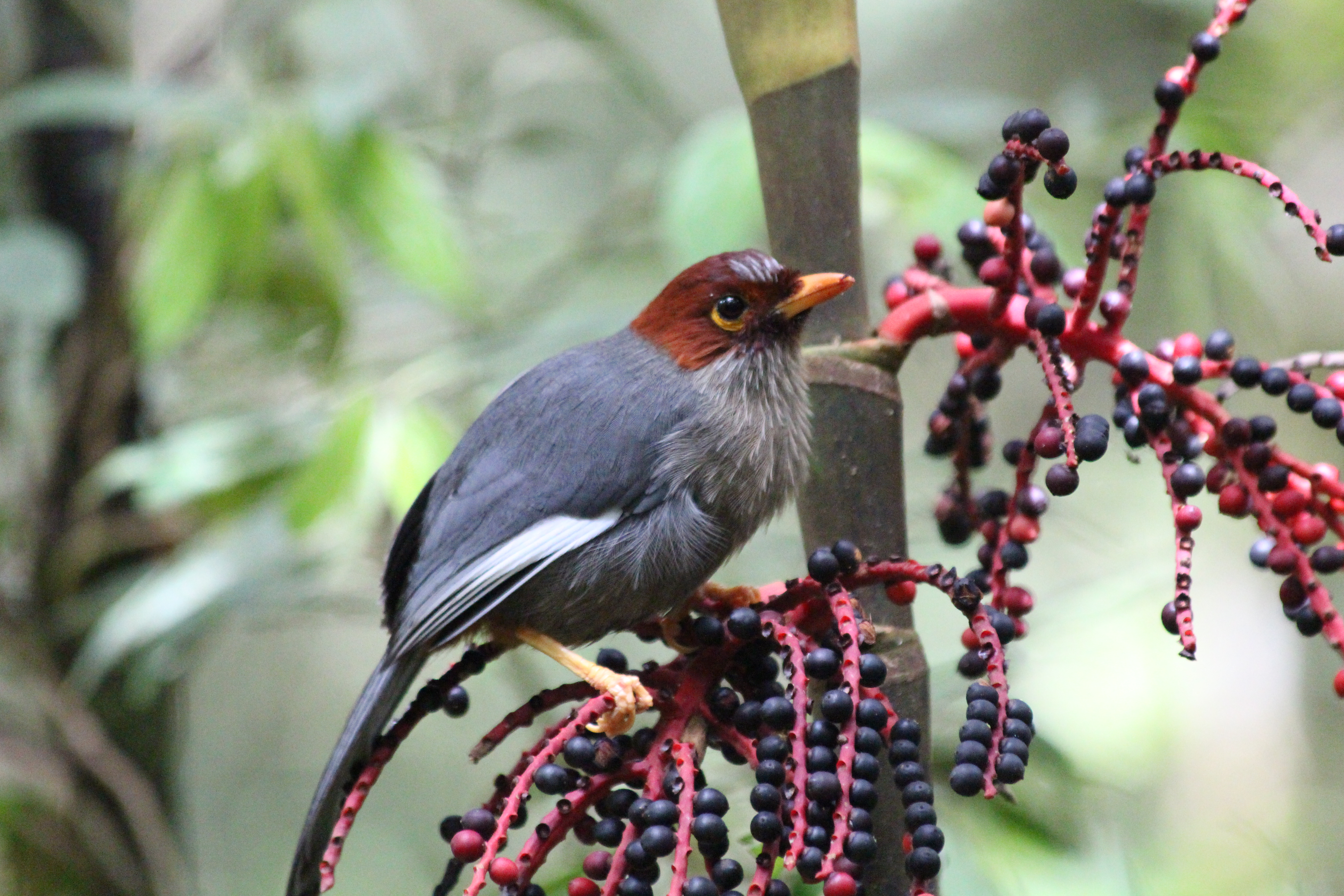
Chestnut-hooded laughingthrush feeding on berries

The chestnut-hooded laughingthrush is omnivorous. It feeds on arthropods such as grasshoppers, ants, crickets, earwigs, moths, caterpillars, leafhoppers, bug larva, flies, small black beetles, and small millipedes. It also eats the fruit of Glochidion, Macaranga, Trema cannabina, Embelia ribes, Sambucus, and melastomes like Medinilla, along with the flowers of the invasive Passiflora edulis and both the fruits and flowers of Rhodamnia.

The species forages by hopping up slanting branches in a woodpecker-like manner without using its tail for support and taking insects from the surface. It sometimes clings to vertical surfaces like the trunks of tree ferns. It will also forage on forest floors and lawns like a Turdus thrush, holding its tail up. It has been recorded feeding on flying ants that are unable to fly and insects hit by vehicles. Foraging is mainly conducted within a few metres of the ground, but the species also sometimes feeds in the canopy.

=== Breeding ===
Breeding in the species has been observed from February to April and in October. The cup-shaped nest is a loose collection made of grass stems, tendrils, dead leaves, and roots, with an outer layer of leaf skeletons, fern leaves, and feathers and no inner lining. It is placed at a height of around 2–9 m (6.6–29.5 ft) in a mass of creepers or ferns suspended from a small tree. Clutches have two glossy, bright blue to greenish-blue eggs.

== Status ==
The chestnut-hooded laughingthrush is classified as being of least concern by the International Union for Conservation of Nature due to its very large range, fairly large population, and a lack of significant population decline. It is common in the montane regions of Borneo and occurs in several protected areas, such as Kayan Mentarang National Park and Kinabalu Park. However, its population is currently thought to be declining due to habitat destruction and habitat fragmentation.
