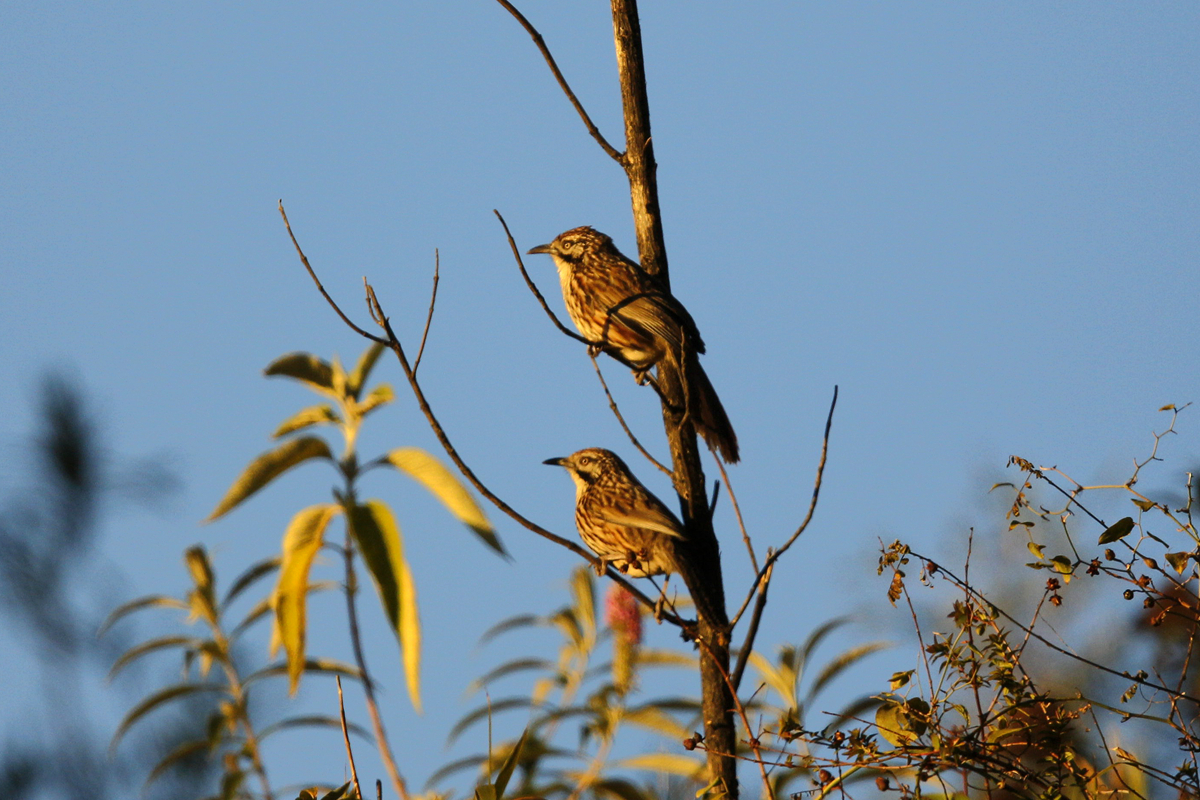

Conservation status
- Least Concern (IUCN 3.1)

Scientific classification
- Kingdom: Animalia
- Phylum: Chordata
- Class: Aves
- Order: Passeriformes
- Family: Leiothrichidae
- Genus: Pterorhinus
- Species: P. woodi

Binomial name
- Pterorhinus woodi (Finn, 1902)

Synonyms
- Babax woodi Garrulax woodi

= Mount Victoria babax =

Species of bird

The Mount Victoria babax (Pterorhinus woodi) is a species of passerine bird in the family Leiothrichidae. It was formerly treated as conspecific with the Chinese babax (Pterorhinus lanceolatus).

It is found above 1,200 m (3,900 ft) in the Lushai Hills in the northeast Indian state of Mizoram and across the border into the Chin Hills in western Myanmar.

== Taxonomy ==
The Mount Victoria babax was described by the English ornithologist Frank Finn in 1902 from a specimen collected in Kanpetlet near Mount Victoria (Nat Ma Taung) in western Myanmar. He coined the binomial name Babax woodi. The specific epithet woodi honours the co-author of the article, Lieutenant Henry Wood (1872-1940), who was a British Army surveyor in India.

The Mount Victoria babax was considered as a subspecies of the Chinese babax until 2005 when the American ornithologists Pamela Rasmussen and John Anderton argued that the Mount Victoria babax should be treated as a separate species based on the differences in the plumage and song. The authors of a comprehensive molecular phylogenetic study published in 2018 estimated that the two taxa split around 1.8 million years ago. The same study found that the babaxes nested in one of three clades formed by the species in the genus Garrulax and suggested that the group should be placed together in the resurrected genus Pterorhinus. This proposal was adopted by the International Ornithologists' Union.
