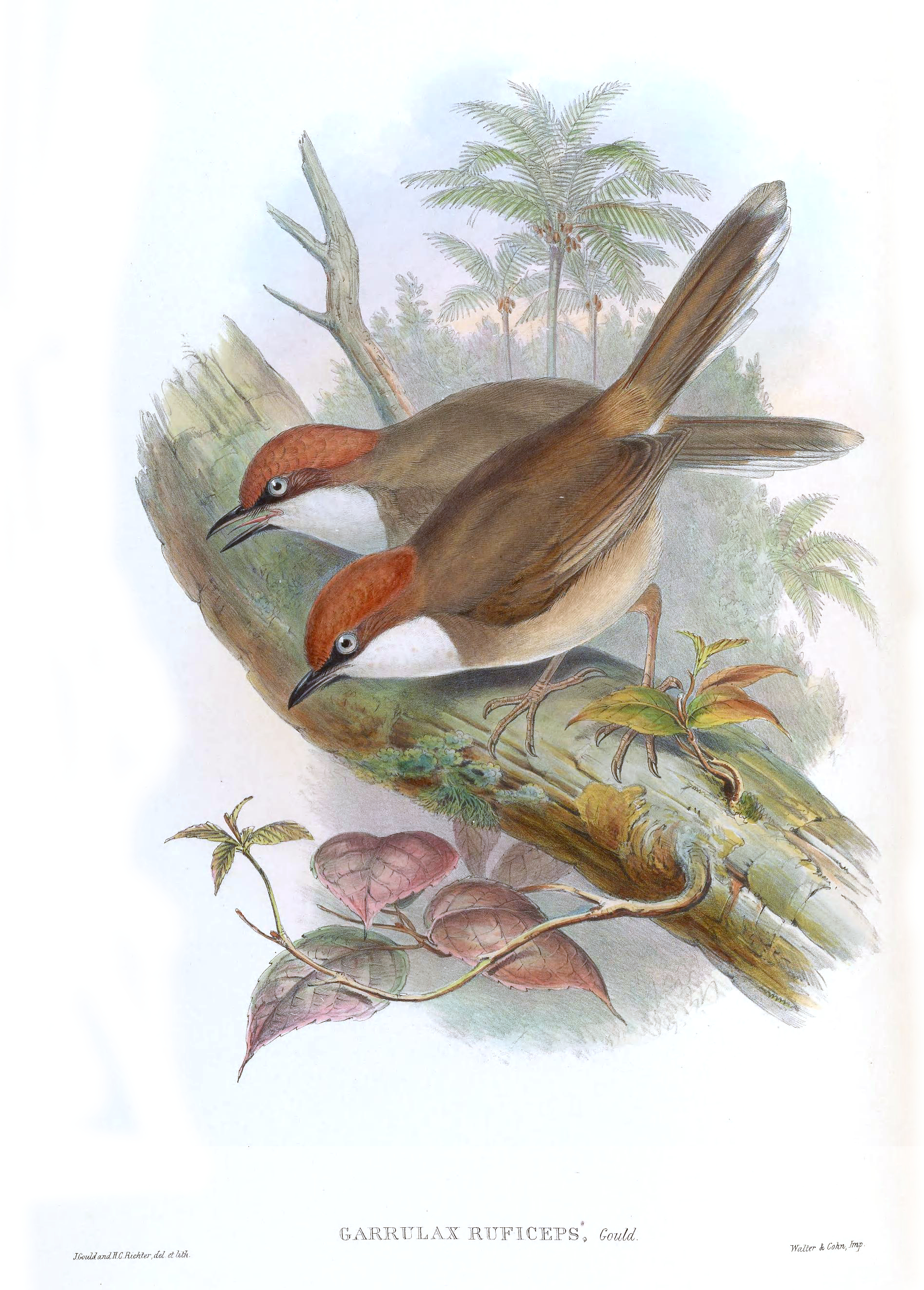

Conservation status
- Least Concern (IUCN 3.1)

Scientific classification
- Kingdom: Animalia
- Phylum: Chordata
- Class: Aves
- Order: Passeriformes
- Family: Leiothrichidae
- Genus: Pterorhinus
- Species: P. ruficeps

Binomial name
- Pterorhinus ruficeps (Gould, 1863)

Synonyms
- Garrulax albogularis ruficeps Ianthocincla ruficeps Garrulax ruficeps

= Rufous-crowned laughingthrush =

Species of bird

The rufous-crowned laughingthrush (Pterorhinus ruficeps) is a species of bird in the family Leiothrichidae. It is endemic to Taiwan. It was previously considered conspecific with the white-throated laughingthrush, P. albogularis.

This species was formerly placed in the genus Garrulax but following the publication of a comprehensive molecular phylogenetic study in 2018, it was moved to the resurrected genus Pterorhinus.
