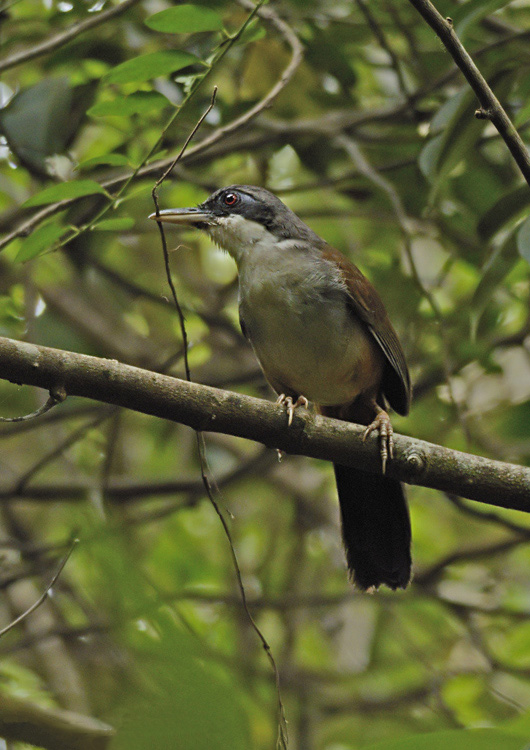

Conservation status
- Least Concern (IUCN 3.1)

Scientific classification
- Kingdom: Animalia
- Phylum: Chordata
- Class: Aves
- Order: Passeriformes
- Family: Leiothrichidae
- Genus: Pterorhinus
- Species: P. delesserti

Binomial name
- Pterorhinus delesserti (Jerdon, 1839)

Synonyms
- Dryonastes delesserti; Ianthocincla delesserti; Garrulax delesserti

= Wayanad laughingthrush =

Species of bird

The Wayanad laughingthrush (Pterorhinus delesserti) is a species of laughingthrush in the family Leiothrichidae. It is endemic to the Western Ghats south of Goa in India. These laughingthrushes move in groups in dense forests, producing loud calls but tend to be hard to spot in the undergrowth. They have brown upperparts, a white throat, a broad black mask through the eye and a heavy bill with pale yellow on the lower mandible. Despite the name, derived from the Wayanad region, this species has a wider range than the four other south Indian species of laughingthrush that are restricted to the higher elevation hills.

== Taxonomy ==
The Wayanad laughingthrush was described by the British physician and naturalist Thomas Jerdon in 1839 and given the binomial name Crateropus delesserti. The specific epithet was chosen to honour the French naturalist Adolphe Delessert who had collected specimens from near Kotagiri in the state of Tamil Nadu, India. Another description by the French ornithologist Frédéric de Lafresnaye was published in 1840.

The generic placement of this species has varied over time and it has been placed in the past under Dryonastes and Garrulax. A 2012 phylogenetic study suggests that it should be separated from Garrulax under the genus Ianthocincla. Following the publication of a comprehensive molecular phylogenetic study in 2018, it was moved from Garrulax to the resurrected genus Pterorhinus.

== Description ==
This species has dark brownish-grey upperparts, a black mask and a white throat. The breast is grey while the belly and underside are rufous. It has some resemblance to the rufous-vented laughingthrush (Pterorhinus gularis) of northeastern India which has a yellow throat. Some older treatments considered lumped delesserti with gularis. The ranges of delesserti and gularis are widely disjunct but museum specimens can be told apart by the pale lower mandible of delesserti unlike the all dark bill of gularis. The tail is uniformly coloured and is darker than the back in delesserti while that of gularis is pale with rufous outer tail feathers. The chin is yellow in gularis while white in delesserti.

== Distribution ==
The Wayanad laughingthrush is patchily distributed south of Goa. Its natural habitat is subtropical or tropical moist forests. Their breeding has been recorded from the plains to the higher hills of southern India. The species has been recorded near Goa, Castle Rock, Karwar, Dandeli, near Bhatkal although it is rare in the northern part of its range. It has been recorded in the Brahmagiris, Nilgiris, and extending south to the Ashambu hills.

== Behaviour and ecology ==
The species is extremely gregarious and tends to skulk in the undergrowth. Flocks vary from six to fifteen but sometimes as many as forty birds may be present together. They feed mainly on the ground turning over leaves to find insects and fallen seed or berries. The calls are loud and include shrill chattering and cackling. Other calls include churring and chirping notes and some calls resemble those of the rufous babbler (Argya subrufa).

The peak breeding season is mainly during the monsoons, April to August in Kerala and July to September in Karnataka, although they may breed at other times of the year. The nest is an untidy cup of grasses with a dome above it. It is placed low in a bush, often on Strobilanthes sp. Three eggs are the typical clutch. The eggs are very spherical and white rather than blue, a feature shared with a few other laughingthrushes such as the white-crested laughingthrush (Garrulax leucolophus). More than a pair have been seen near a nest suggesting the presence of helpers at the nest.
