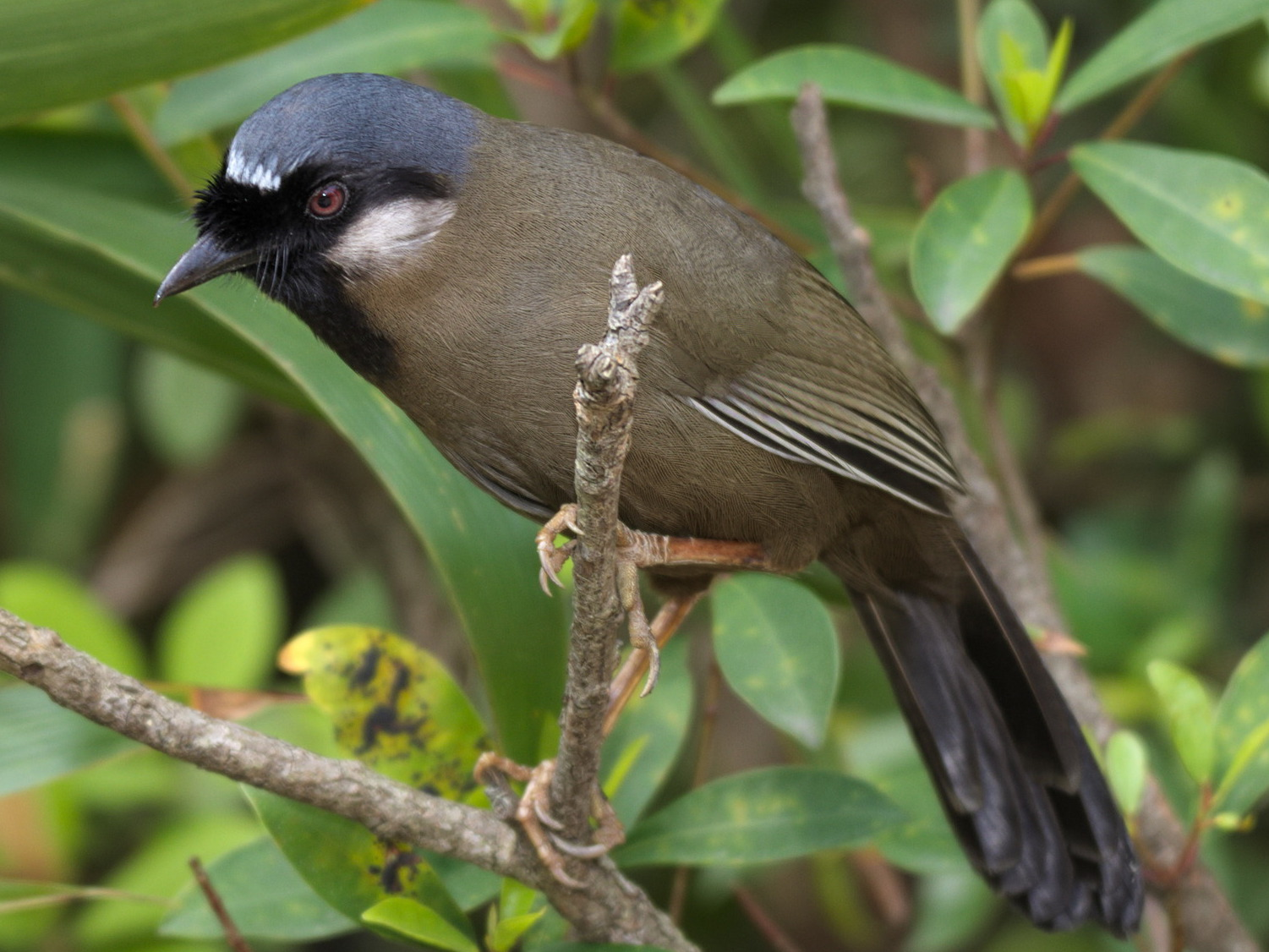

Conservation status
- Least Concern (IUCN 3.1)

Scientific classification
- Kingdom: Animalia
- Phylum: Chordata
- Class: Aves
- Order: Passeriformes
- Family: Leiothrichidae
- Genus: Pterorhinus
- Species: P. chinensis

Binomial name
- Pterorhinus chinensis (Scopoli, 1786)

Synonyms
- Ianthocincla chinensis Garrulax chinensis

= Black-throated laughingthrush =

Species of bird

The black-throated laughingthrush (Pterorhinus chinensis) is a species of bird in the family Leiothrichidae. It is found in Cambodia, China, Laos, Myanmar, Thailand, and Vietnam. Its natural habitats are subtropical or tropical moist lowland forest and subtropical or tropical moist montane forest, mostly at submontane to montane elevations.

== Taxonomy ==
The black-throated laughingthrush was described as Lanius (chinensis) by the Italian naturalist Giovanni Antonio Scopoli in 1786 based on specimens from Guangzhou, China. The black-throated laughingthrush was historically placed in the wastebin genus Garrulax, although some authors also placed it in Dryonastes or Ianthocincla. Following the publication of a comprehensive molecular phylogenetic study in 2018, it was moved to the resurrected genus Pterorhinus.

Based on a combination of strong morphological and genetic evidence, the subspecies on Hainan Island is treated as a distinct species by some authors, Swinhoe's laughingthrush (Pterorhinus monachus). However, the degree of divergence between the two taxa is not very deep, with the two only having split 0.3–1.6 mya, and thus Swinhoe's laughingthrush continues to be considered a subspecies of the black-throated laughingthrush by most checklists.

The black-throated laughingthrush is most closely related to the chestnut-backed laughingthrush, with the two occasionally having been considered the same species in the past. These two species are further most closely related to the rufous-necked laughingthrush.

== Distribution and habitat ==
The black-throated laughingthrush occurs throughout most of Indochina and southern China, including southern Hainan island. In Indochina, its range encompasses eastern Myanmar, Thailand, most of Vietnam and Laos, and eastern Cambodia. One individual was seen on Mount Saramati in western Myanmar, outside of its usual range. It is absent from southern and central Thailand. The laughingthrush has been introduced to many places outside its native range. The species was introduced to the island of Kauaʻi in Hawaii twice, in 1931 and 1941, but the population there was apparently extirpated by 1967. The population in Hong Kong is thought to have descended from released cagebirds. The species has also been introduced to Taiwan, where it is increasing in population. In Thailand, a population of feral laughingthrushes at Bang Phra Non-hunting Area in Chonburi most likely descended from escapees from a nearby wildlife breeding station. Records of the species from Bangkok are likely long-lived escaped individuals, with no records of black-throated laughingthrushes breeding within the city. The species has also been introduced to Singapore. In Hainan, there are records of introduced individuals of the mainland subspecies.

The black-throated laughingthrush inhabits a variety of woodland habitats, preferring broadleaf evergreen forest, mixed deciduous forest, and secondary forest, at elevations of up to 1,525 m (5,000 ft). In Indochina, it is most abundant in lower montane forest, but has also been recorded from bamboo thickets, scrubland, and grassy areas.On Hainan, the endemic subspecies is mainly restricted to the Hainan Bawangling National Nature Reserve at elevations of 400 m (1,310 ft), but can sometimes be seen in forested areas up to 1,200 m (3,940 ft). In areas where it has been introduced, like Hong Kong, the species is known to inhabit urban parks. In Taiwan, it occurs in forests in the lowlands and hills.

== Conservation ==
The black-throated laughingthrush is classified as being of least concern by the IUCN on the IUCN Red List, although it is thought to be experiencing population declines throughout most of its native range. Some introduced populations have seen local increases in population, especially in Taiwan, where the population is thought to number around 100 breeding pairs.
