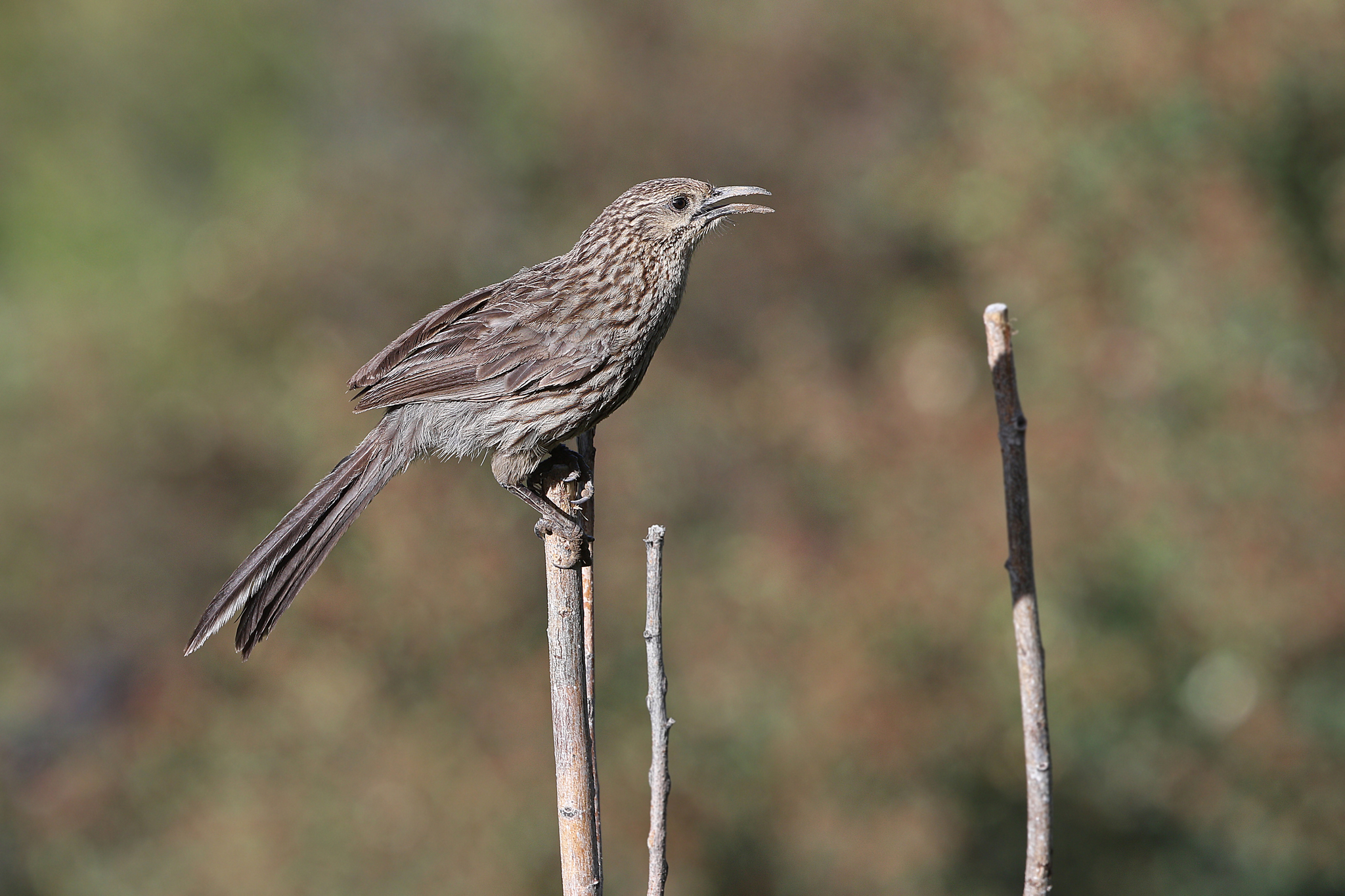

Conservation status
- Near Threatened (IUCN 3.1)

Scientific classification
- Kingdom: Animalia
- Phylum: Chordata
- Class: Aves
- Order: Passeriformes
- Family: Leiothrichidae
- Genus: Pterorhinus
- Species: P. waddelli

Binomial name
- Pterorhinus waddelli (Dresser, 1905)

Synonyms
- Ianthocincla waddelli Babax waddelli

= Giant babax =

Species of bird

The giant babax (Pterorhinus waddelli) is a species of bird in the laughingthrush family Leiothrichidae, found in northeast India and southern Tibet. It prefers the low bushes at the edge of the southern Tibetan plateau, but it can adapt to both dry and cold mountain habitats. It is also commonly seen around villages and monasteries, where it feeds off scraps.

== Description ==
It is a bulky, long-tailed brown bird with a curved bill and dark streaks. On average, it is 31–34 cm (12–13 in) long. Its vocalizations vary between melodic flute-like notes and harsh jabbering ones.

== Threats ==
It is threatened by habitat loss.

== Diet ==
Its diet includes insects (Lepidoptera and Diptera) and berries in the summer, and crop seeds, berries, and plant rhizomes in the winter.

== Breeding ==
Its breeding season lasts from May to July. It mainly nests in willows (Salix longistamina), Rosa sericea, Populus szechuanica, Cotoneaster microphyllus, and elm trees. It prefers to nest in areas dense with trees, close to water but far from human settlements.

== Taxonomy ==
The giant babax was described by the English ornithologist Henry Dresser in 1905 from a specimen collected by the British explorer Laurence Waddell in the Yarlung Tsangpo river valley in Tibet. Based on the results of a comprehensive molecular phylogenetic study of the Leiothrichidae that was published in 2018, the giant babax was placed in the resurrected genus Pterorhinus.
