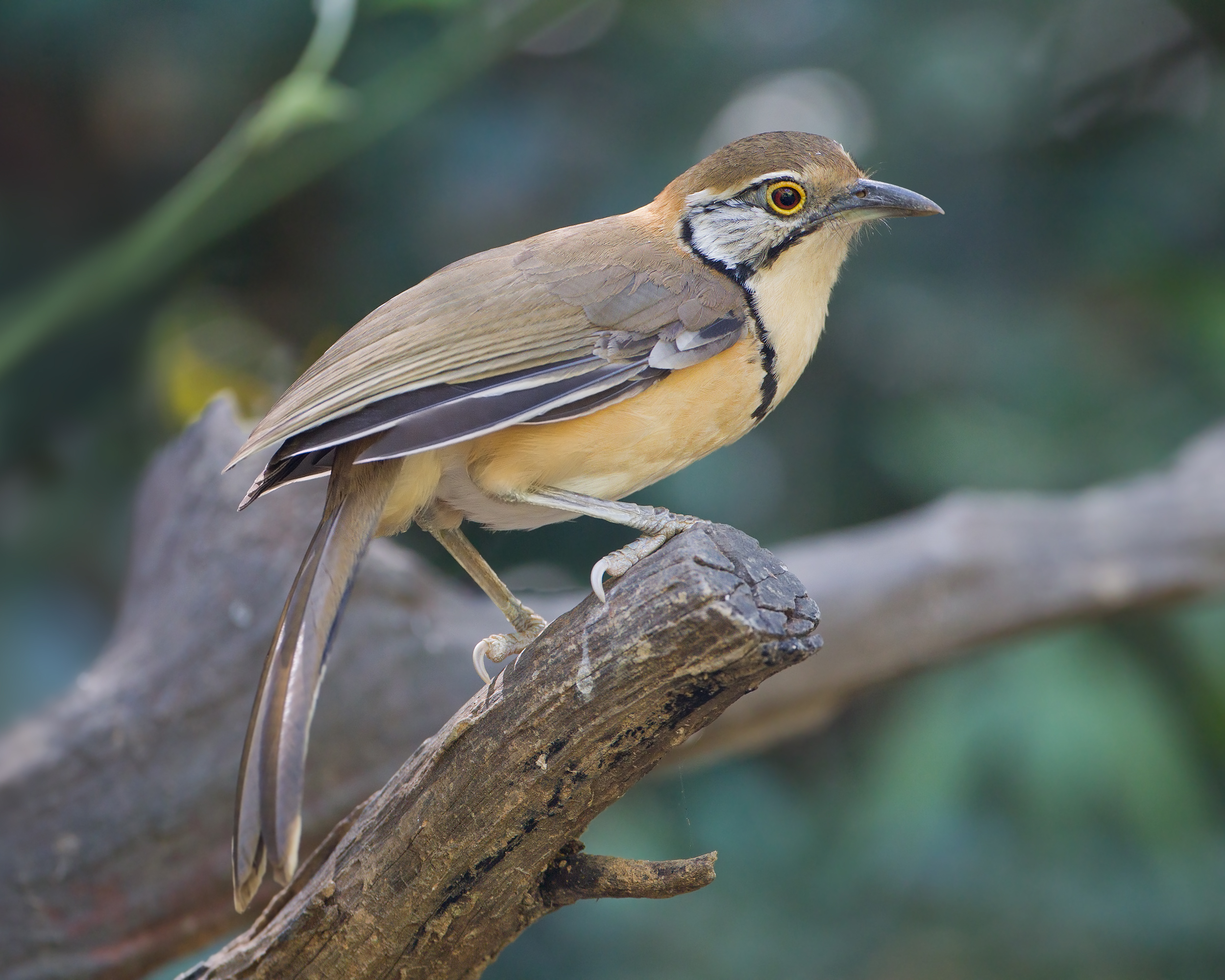
- In Thailand

Conservation status
- Least Concern (IUCN 3.1)

Scientific classification
- Kingdom: Animalia
- Phylum: Chordata
- Class: Aves
- Order: Passeriformes
- Family: Leiothrichidae
- Genus: Pterorhinus
- Species: P. pectoralis

Binomial name
- Pterorhinus pectoralis (Gould, 1836)

Synonyms
- Ianthocincla pectoralis Garrulax pectoralis

= Greater necklaced laughingthrush =

Species of bird

The greater necklaced laughingthrush (Pterorhinus pectoralis) is a species of passerine bird in the family Leiothrichidae. It is found in Bangladesh, Bhutan, China, India, Laos, Myanmar, Nepal, Thailand and Vietnam. It is introduced to Hawaii. Its natural habitats are subtropical or tropical moist lowland forest and subtropical or tropical moist montane forest.

This species was formerly placed in the genus Garrulax but following the publication of a comprehensive molecular phylogenetic study in 2018, it was moved to the resurrected genus Pterorhinus.

== Behavior and ecology ==
In mixed-species foraging flocks, greater necklaced laughingthrushes tend to be dominant. The mimicry of this species by the Lesser necklaced laughingthrush, which is not especially closely related, may have been selected for as a result.

== Gallery ==
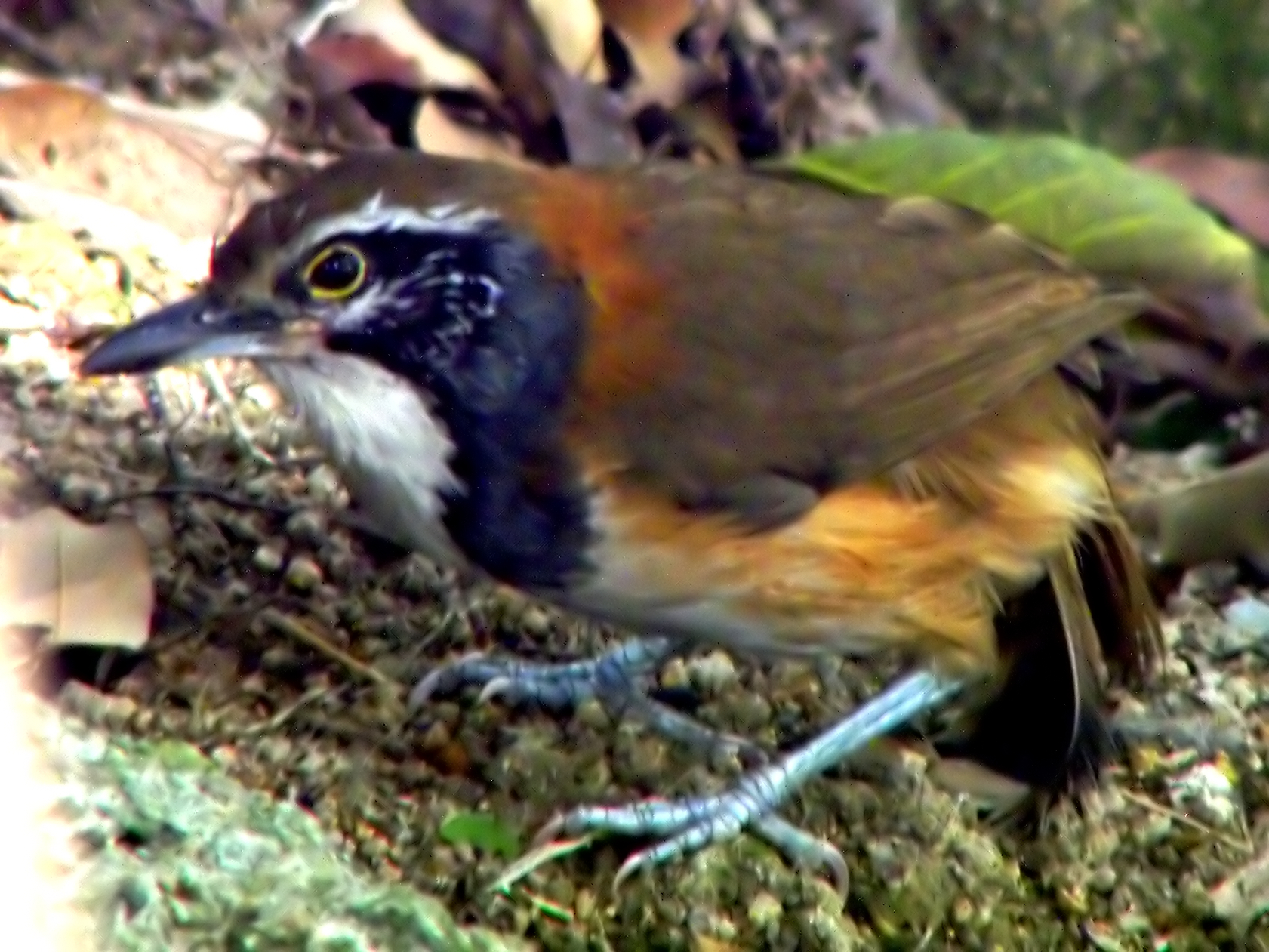

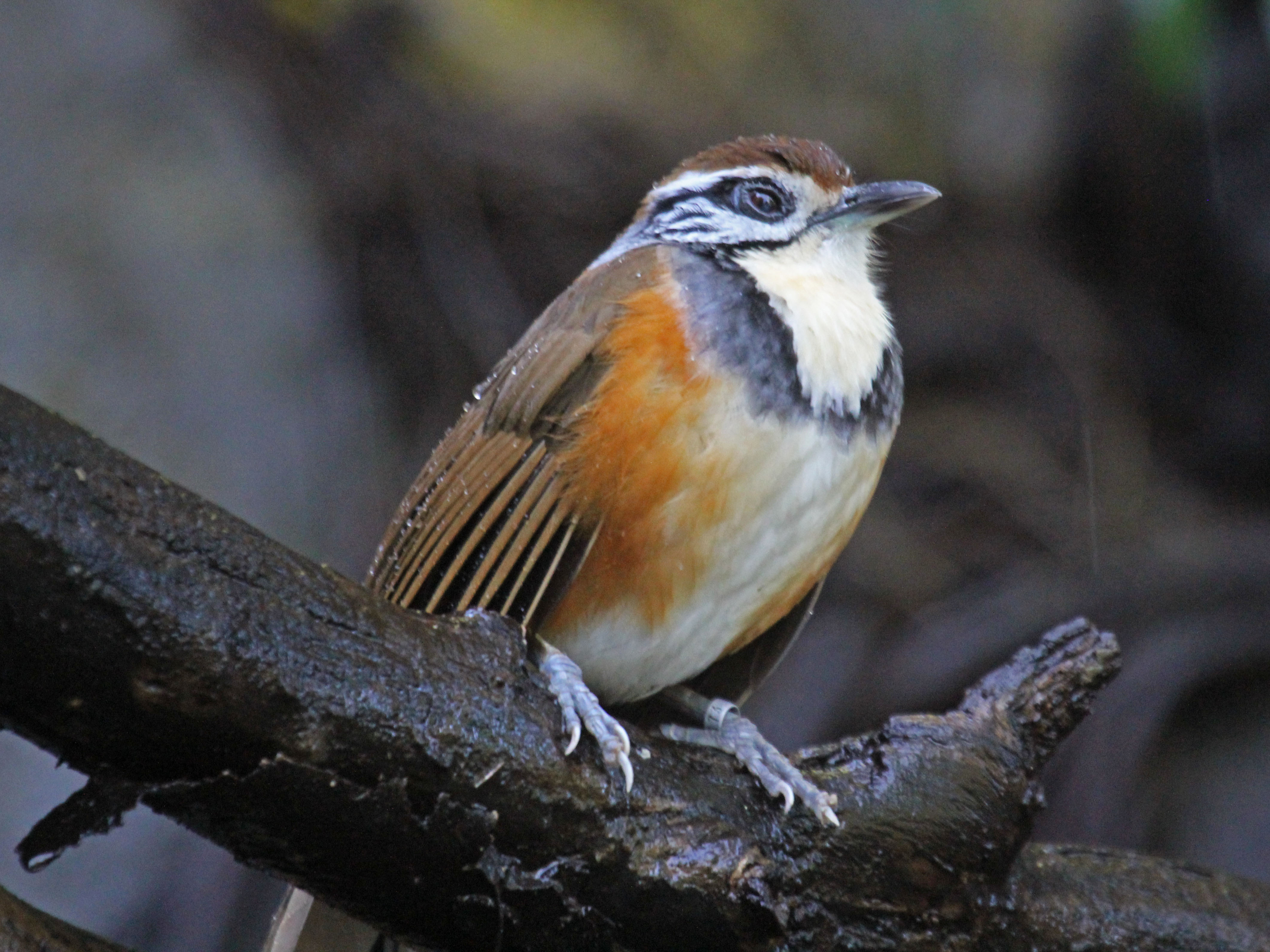
At San Diego Zoo

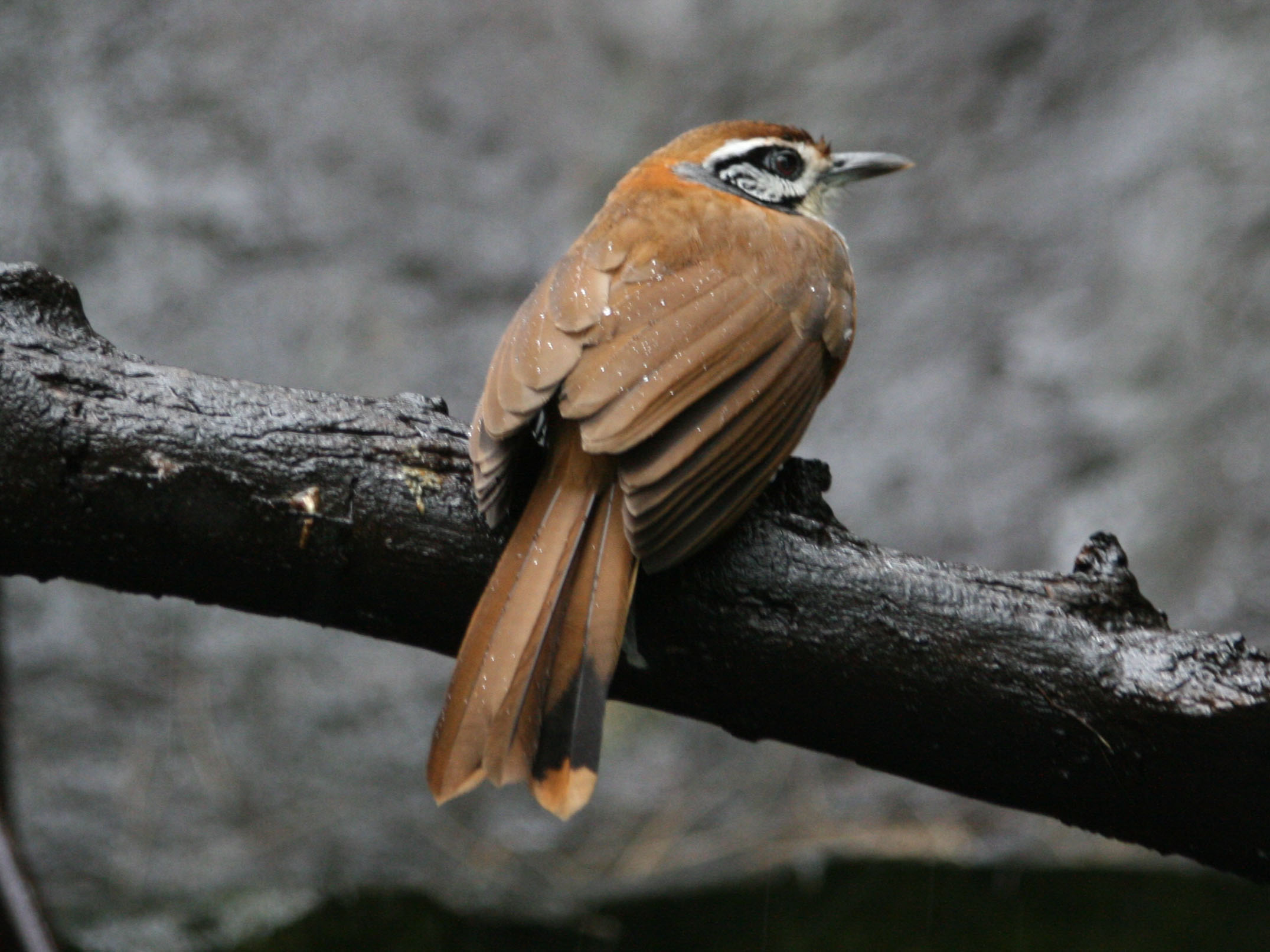
At San Diego Zoo
