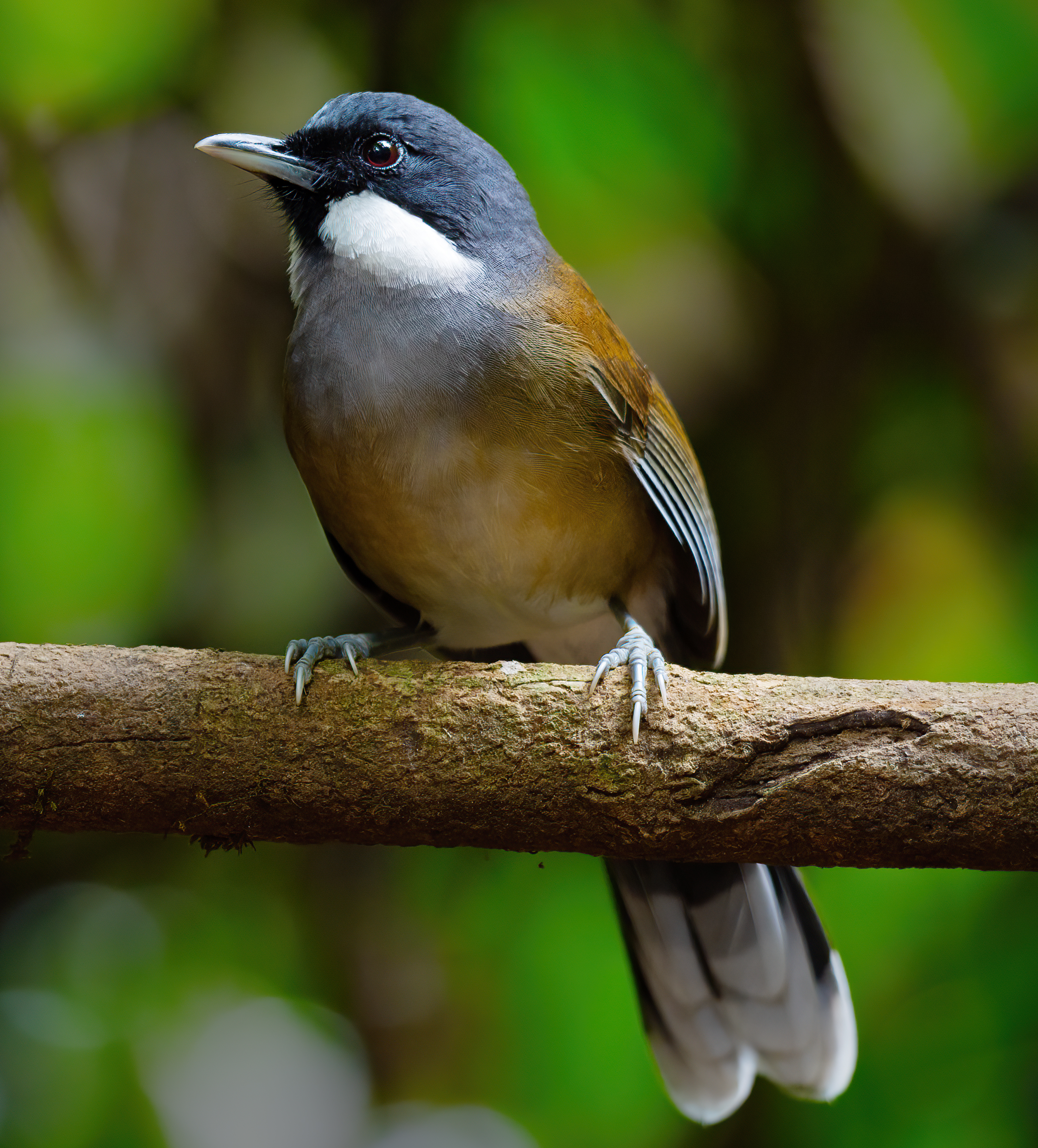

Conservation status
- Least Concern (IUCN 3.1)

Scientific classification
- Kingdom: Animalia
- Phylum: Chordata
- Class: Aves
- Order: Passeriformes
- Family: Leiothrichidae
- Genus: Pterorhinus
- Species: P. vassali

Binomial name
- Pterorhinus vassali (Ogilvie-Grant, 1906)

Synonyms
- Ianthocincla vassali Garrulax vassali

= White-cheeked laughingthrush =

Species of bird

The white-cheeked laughingthrush (Pterorhinus vassali) is a species of bird in the family Leiothrichidae. It is found in Cambodia, Laos and Vietnam. Its natural habitats are subtropical or tropical moist lowland forests and subtropical or tropical moist montane forests.

The white-cheeked laughingthrush was formerly placed in the genus Garrulax but following the publication of a comprehensive molecular phylogenetic study in 2018, it was moved to the resurrected genus Pterorhinus.
