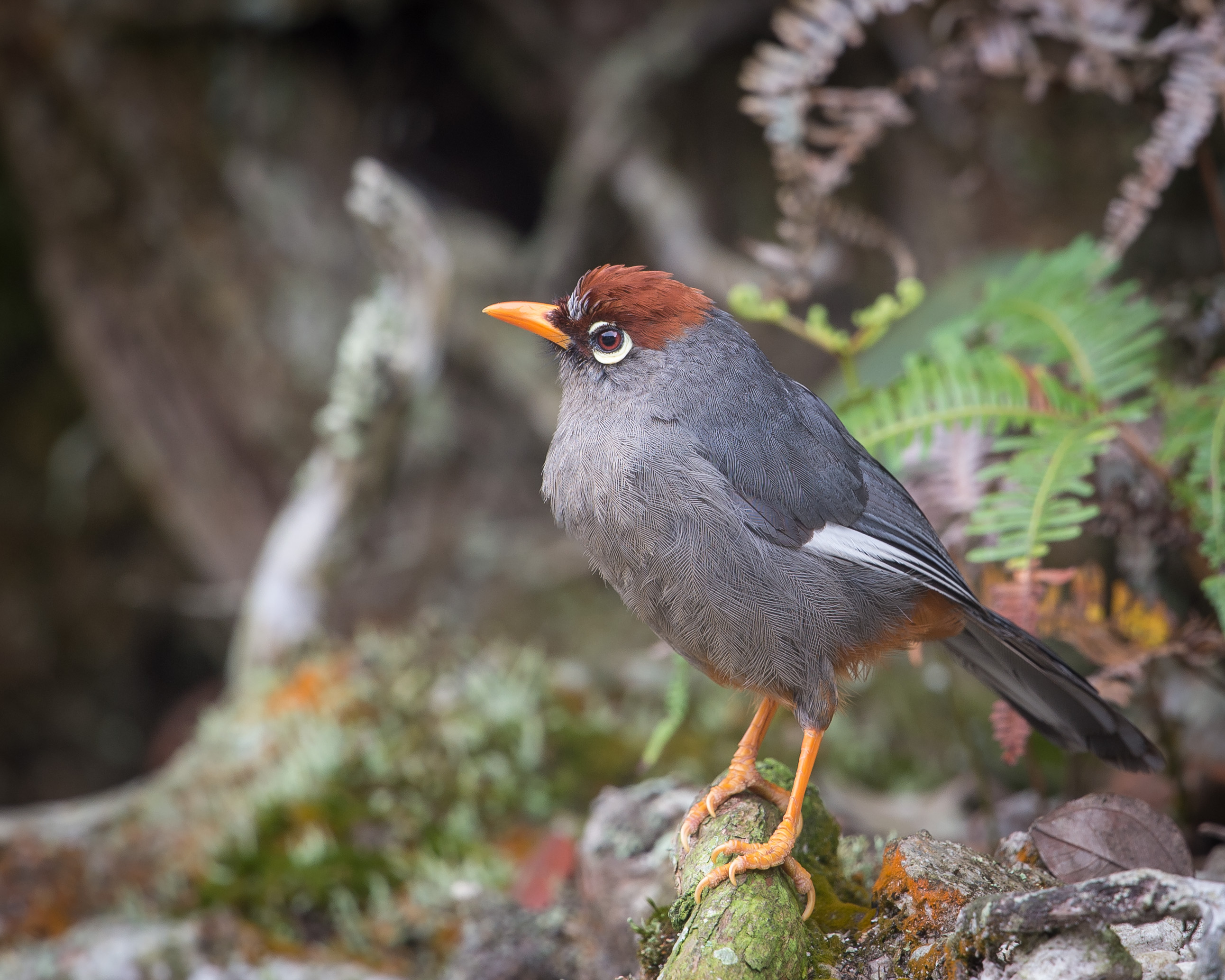

Conservation status
- Near Threatened (IUCN 3.1)

Scientific classification
- Kingdom: Animalia
- Phylum: Chordata
- Class: Aves
- Order: Passeriformes
- Family: Leiothrichidae
- Genus: Pterorhinus
- Species: P. mitratus

Binomial name
- Pterorhinus mitratus (S. Müller, 1836)

Synonyms
- Ianthocincla mitrata Garrulax mitratus

= Chestnut-capped laughingthrush =

Species of bird

The chestnut-capped laughingthrush (Pterorhinus mitratus), also known as the spectacled laughingthrush, is a species of bird in the family Leiothrichidae. It is found in Sumatra (Indonesia) and the Thai-Malay Peninsula. Its natural habitats are subtropical or tropical moist lowland forests and subtropical or tropical moist montane forests. The chestnut-hooded laughingthrush was previously considered a subspecies.

The chestnut-capped laughingthrush was formerly placed in the genus Garrulax but following the publication of a comprehensive molecular phylogenetic study in 2018, it was moved to the resurrected genus Pterorhinus.
