= Frédéric Courtois =

French missionary and naturalist (1860–1928)

Frédéric Courtois (French pronunciation: [fʁedeʁik kuʁtwa]; 1860–1928) was a French missionary and naturalist.

Frédéric Courtois was a missionary in China from 1901 until his death. He directed Musée Heude in Xujiahui. Courtois was primarily interested in ornithology and botany. From 1906 to 1928, he organized expeditions in the provinces of Jiangsu and the mountains of Anhui and the Huangshan range. On these expeditions, he brought back some 40,000 specimens. His Anhui plant collection was published in 1933 by his successor, Henry Belval.

In 1923 Auguste Ménégaux gave the scientific name Garrulax courtoisi to the blue-crowned laughingthrush in his honor.

== Works ==
- 1912. Catalogue des oiseaux du Musée de Zi-Kia-Wei (Xujiahui) Mém. Hist. Nat. Emp. Chinois, 5 (3) : 1-98.
- 1927. Les oiseaux du musée de Zi-Kia-Wei Mém . Hist. Nat. Chine, 5 (3), 5e fasc.:123-159.
