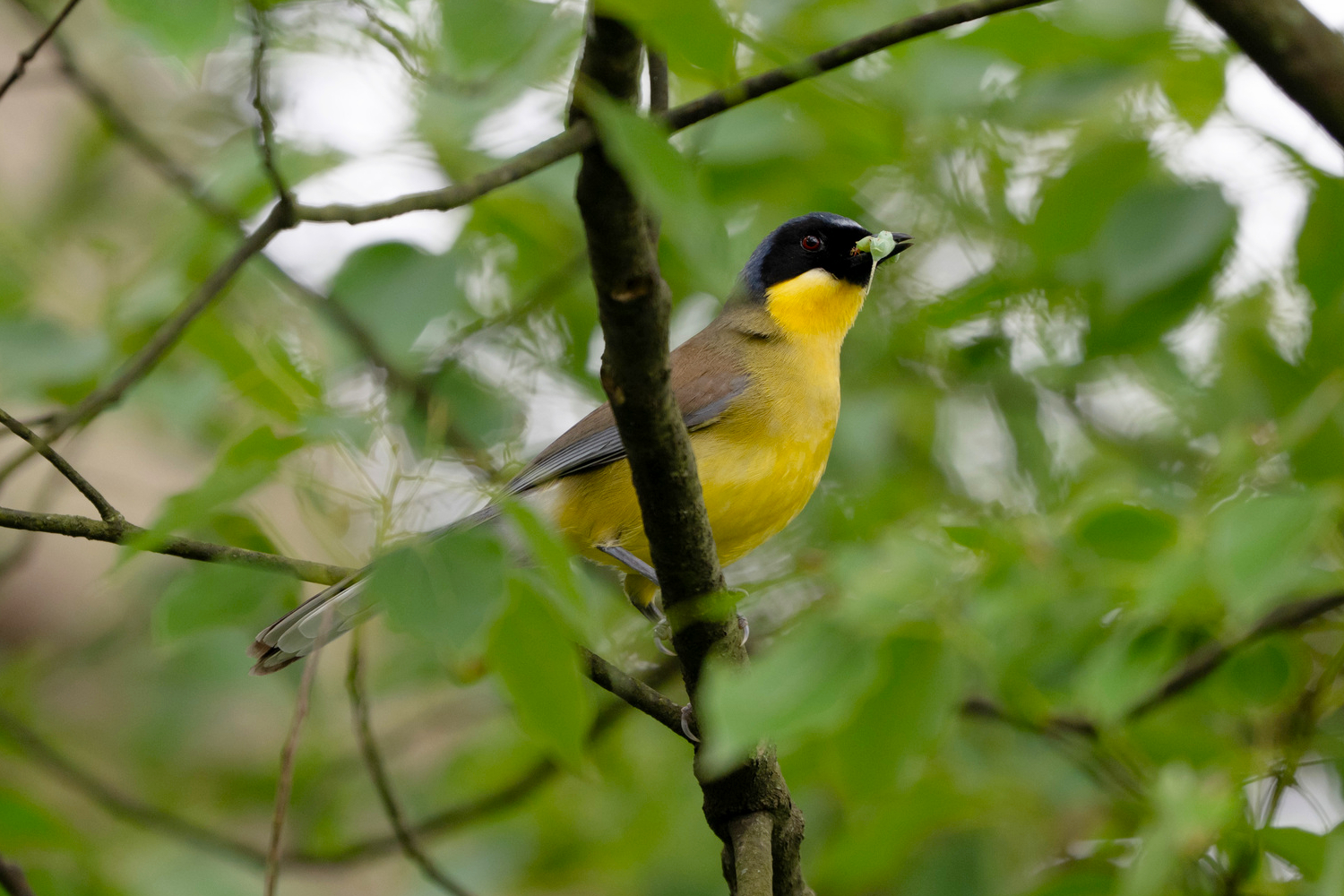
- Nominate Pterorhinus courtoisi courtoisi, Wuyuan, Jiangxi, China

Conservation status
- Critically Endangered (IUCN 3.1)

Scientific classification
- Kingdom: Animalia
- Phylum: Chordata
- Class: Aves
- Order: Passeriformes
- Family: Leiothrichidae
- Genus: Pterorhinus
- Species: P. courtoisi

Binomial name
- Pterorhinus courtoisi (Ménégaux, 1923)

Synonyms
- Garrulax galbanus courtoisi Ianthocincla courtoisi Garrulax courtoisi

= Blue-crowned laughingthrush =

Species of bird

The blue-crowned laughingthrush or Courtois's laughingbird (Pterorhinus courtoisi) is a species of bird in the family Leiothrichidae. It is now found only in Jiangxi, China. Until recently, this critically endangered species was generally treated as a subspecies of the yellow-throated laughingthrush, but that species has a pale grey (not bluish) crown.

The blue-crowned laughingthrush was formerly placed in the genus Garrulax but following the publication of a comprehensive molecular phylogenetic study in 2018, it was moved to the resurrected genus Pterorhinus. The specific name was chosen to honour the French missionary to China Frédéric Courtois (1860–1928).

== Genomics ==
A chromosome-level genome assembly of Pterorhinus courtoisi was published in 2026. The genome size is approximately 1.26 Gb, with 92.32% of the sequence anchored to 39 pseudochromosomes. The assembly has a BUSCO completeness of 96.6%, and 16,807 protein-coding genes were predicted.

== Population ==
The nominate subspecies was only rediscovered in 2000, in Wuyuan County, Jiangxi, but remains very rare with a total wild population of approximately 200 individuals. The subspecies P. c. simaoensis has not been encountered in the wild since the type specimens were collected in Simao, Yunnan, in 1956. More than 100 blue-crowned laughingthrushes are kept in zoos (where part of a captive breeding program) and private aviculture, but it is unclear what subspecies they belong to. A recent review failed to support the distinction of two separate subspecies, leading to P. c. simaoensis being treated as a synonym of the nominate in Handbook of the Birds of the World.

== Conservation status ==
This bird was erroneously listed as a species of least concern in the 2006 IUCN Red List. Currently, it seems close to extinction at least in the wild, and its status was thus corrected to critically endangered in the 2007 Red List issue.

== See also ==
- List of endangered and protected species of China
