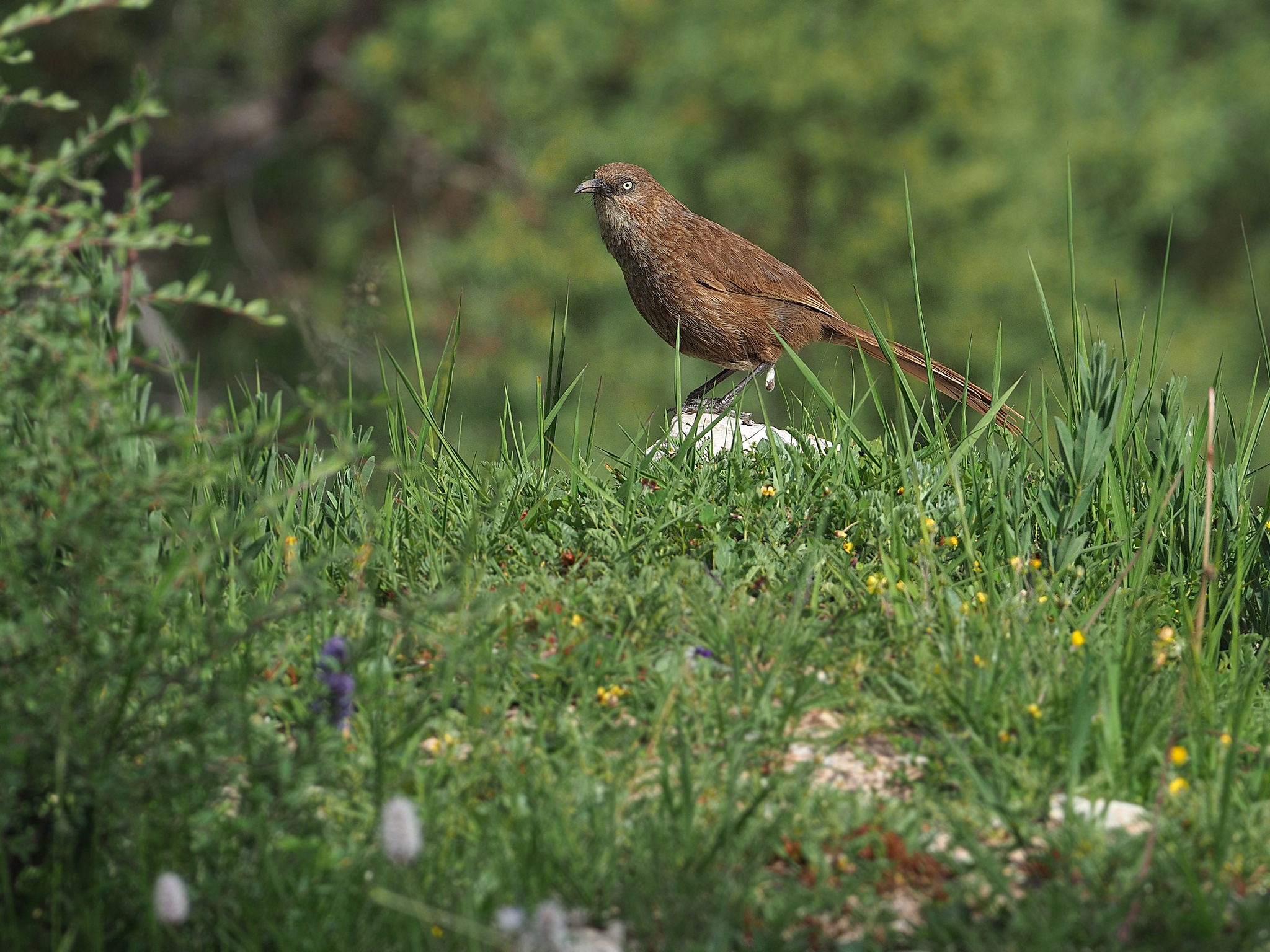

Conservation status
- Near Threatened (IUCN 3.1)

Scientific classification
- Kingdom: Animalia
- Phylum: Chordata
- Class: Aves
- Order: Passeriformes
- Family: Leiothrichidae
- Genus: Pterorhinus
- Species: P. koslowi

Binomial name
- Pterorhinus koslowi (Bianchi, 1905)

Synonyms
- Ianthocincla koslowi Babax koslowi

= Tibetan babax =

Species of bird

The Tibetan babax (Pterorhinus koslowi) is a species of bird in the family Leiothrichidae. It is endemic to China. It is threatened by habitat loss.

This species was formerly placed in the genus Babax but following the publication of a comprehensive molecular phylogenetic study in 2018, Babax was subsumed in to the resurrected genus Pterorhinus.
