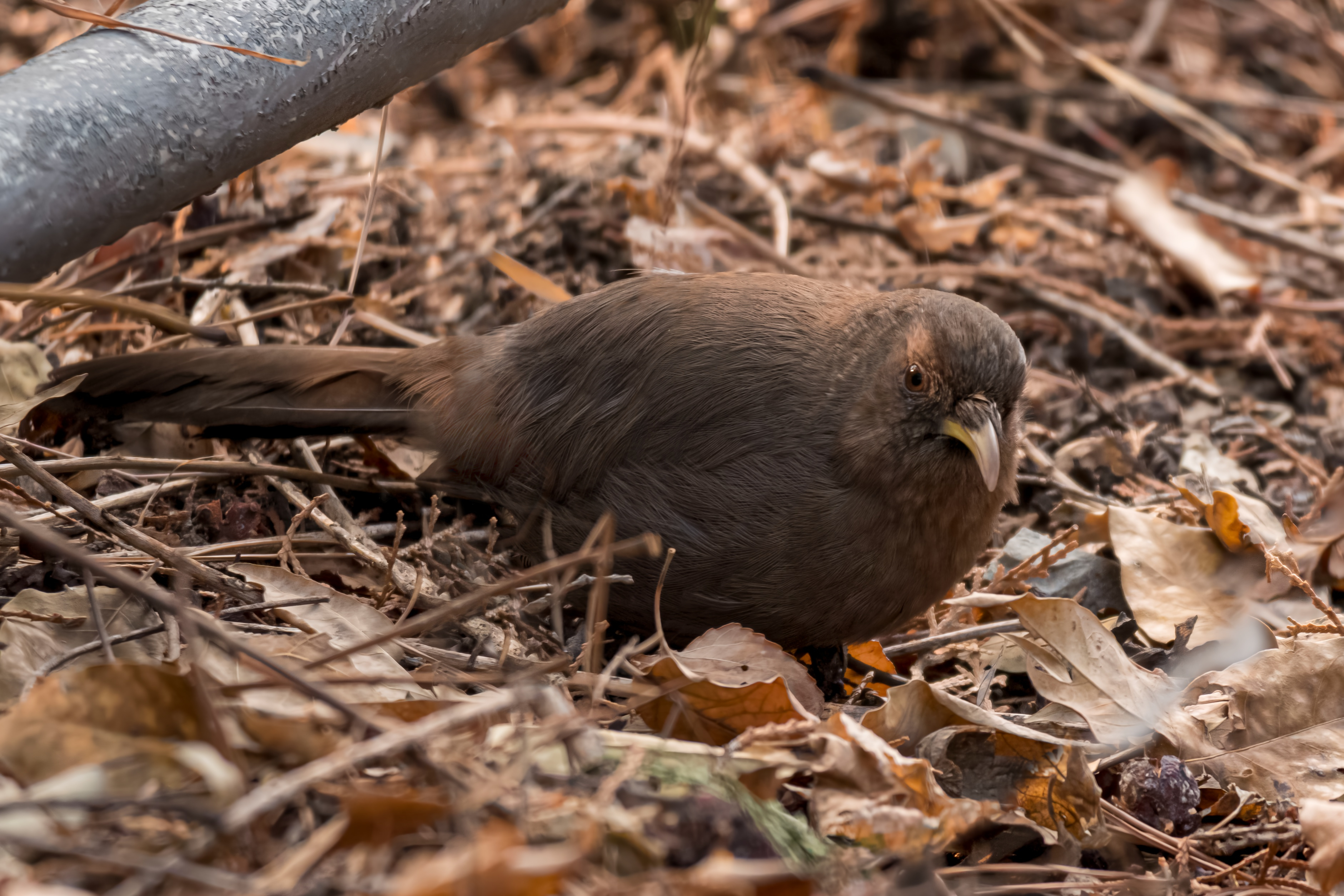
- Photographed in Huairou, Beijing, China

Conservation status
- Least Concern (IUCN 3.1)

Scientific classification
- Kingdom: Animalia
- Phylum: Chordata
- Class: Aves
- Order: Passeriformes
- Family: Leiothrichidae
- Genus: Pterorhinus
- Species: P. davidi

Binomial name
- Pterorhinus davidi R. Swinhoe, 1868

Synonyms
- Ianthocincla davidi; Garrulax davidi

= Plain laughingthrush =

Species of bird

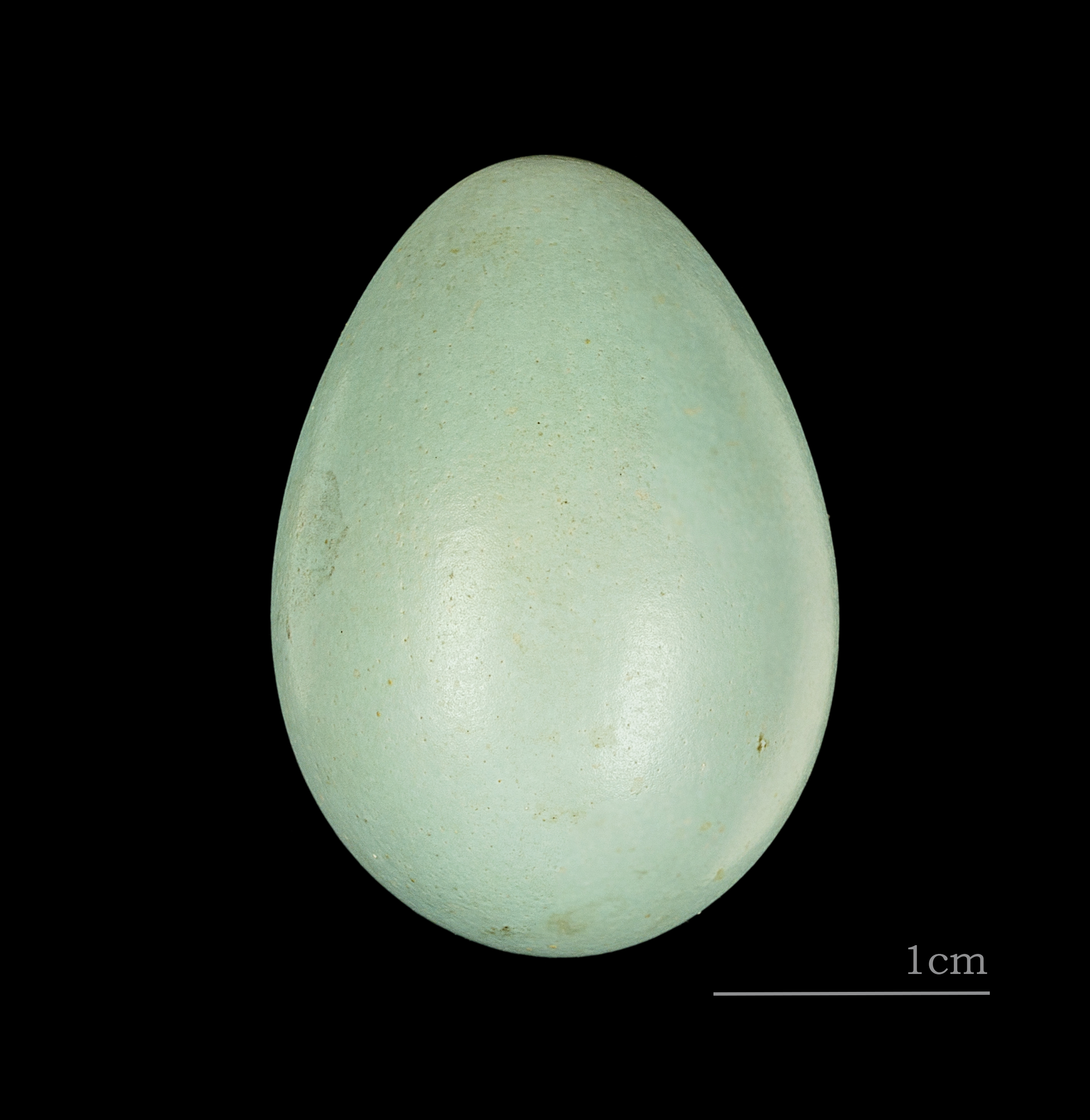
Egg MHNT

The plain laughingthrush or Père David's laughingthrush (Pterorhinus davidi) is a species of bird in the family Leiothrichidae. It is endemic to central and northeastern China. Its natural habitat is temperate forests.

== Taxonomy ==
The plain laughingthrush was described by the English zoologist Robert Swinhoe in 1868 while resident in Amoy, on the basis of a specimen sent from Beijing by Armand David, alongside another new specimen that would be described as the Beijing babbler. The letter accompanying the two specimens mentioned that it was very common in the mountains around Beijing and was a sedentary species, usually occupying the same habitats as the Beijing babbler. Though David had proposed the binomial name Pomatorhinus stridulus, Swinhoe described it under the name Pterorhinus davidi, erecting the new genus Pterorhinus (from the Greek for "feather nose", in reference to the bird's beak) to accommodate it. The specific epithet honours the aforementioned French missionary (1826-1900) who worked in China between 1858 and 1874. This species was normally placed in the genus Garrulax but following the publication of a comprehensive molecular phylogenetic study in 2018, the genus Pterorhinus was resurrected and the plain laughingthrush was returned to its original genus.

== Description ==
The bird is distinguished by its curved bill and greyish-brown color with no defined markings, other than some faint mottling on the front. It is the most northerly of the laughingthrushes and therefore the only bird in said family across much of its range. Its appearance and behavior, especially its ability to imitate the calls of other birds, mirrors that of the New World thrashers due to convergent evolution. Its vocalisations include buzzing calls and a relatively varied series of whistled songs similar to those of true thrushes; males have been recorded using quiet songs to signify aggressive intent.
