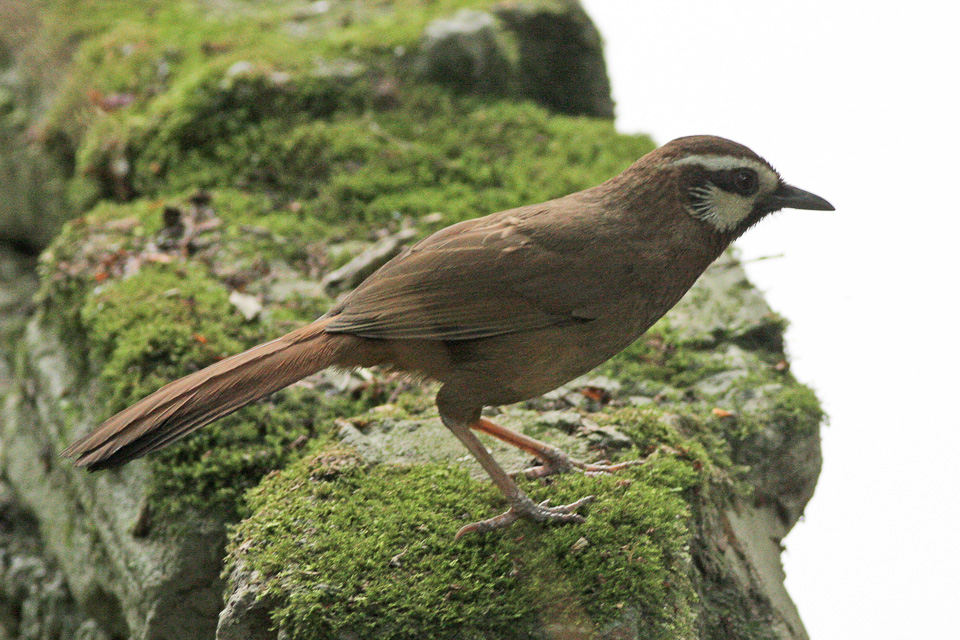

Conservation status
- Least Concern (IUCN 3.1)

Scientific classification
- Kingdom: Animalia
- Phylum: Chordata
- Class: Aves
- Order: Passeriformes
- Family: Leiothrichidae
- Genus: Pterorhinus
- Species: P. sannio

Binomial name
- Pterorhinus sannio (R. Swinhoe, 1867)

Synonyms
- Ianthocincla sannio; Garrulax sannio

= White-browed laughingthrush =

Species of bird

The white-browed laughingthrush (Pterorhinus sannio) is a bird in the family Leiothrichidae. The species was first described by Robert Swinhoe in 1867. It is found in China, Hong Kong, India, Laos, Myanmar, Thailand, and Vietnam.

This species was formerly placed in the genus Garrulax but following the publication of a comprehensive molecular phylogenetic study in 2018, it was moved to the resurrected genus Pterorhinus.
