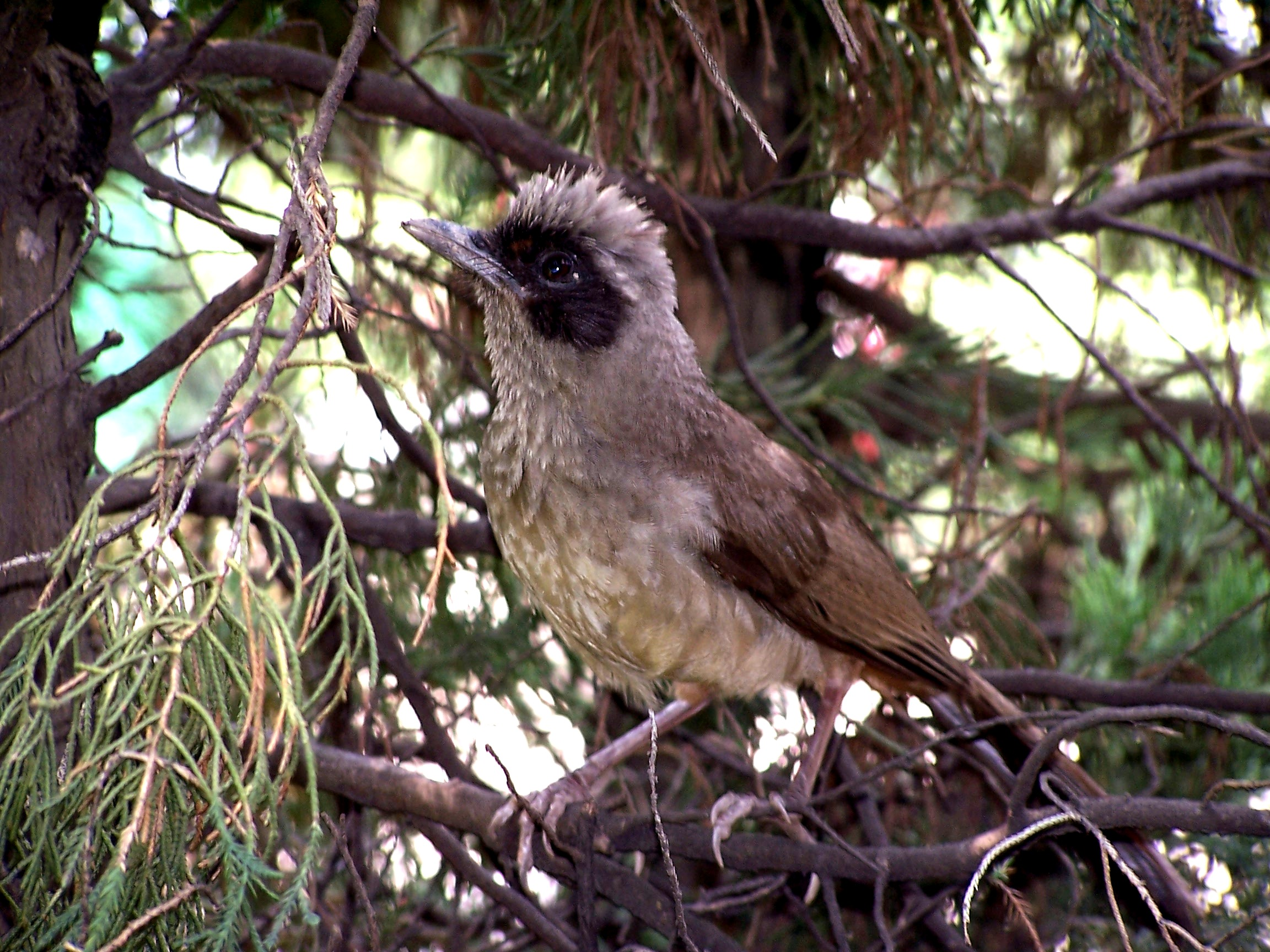

Conservation status
- Least Concern (IUCN 3.1)

Scientific classification
- Kingdom: Animalia
- Phylum: Chordata
- Class: Aves
- Order: Passeriformes
- Family: Leiothrichidae
- Genus: Pterorhinus
- Species: P. perspicillatus

Binomial name
- Pterorhinus perspicillatus (Gmelin, JF, 1789)

Synonyms
- Garrulax perspicillatus

= Masked laughingthrush =

Species of bird

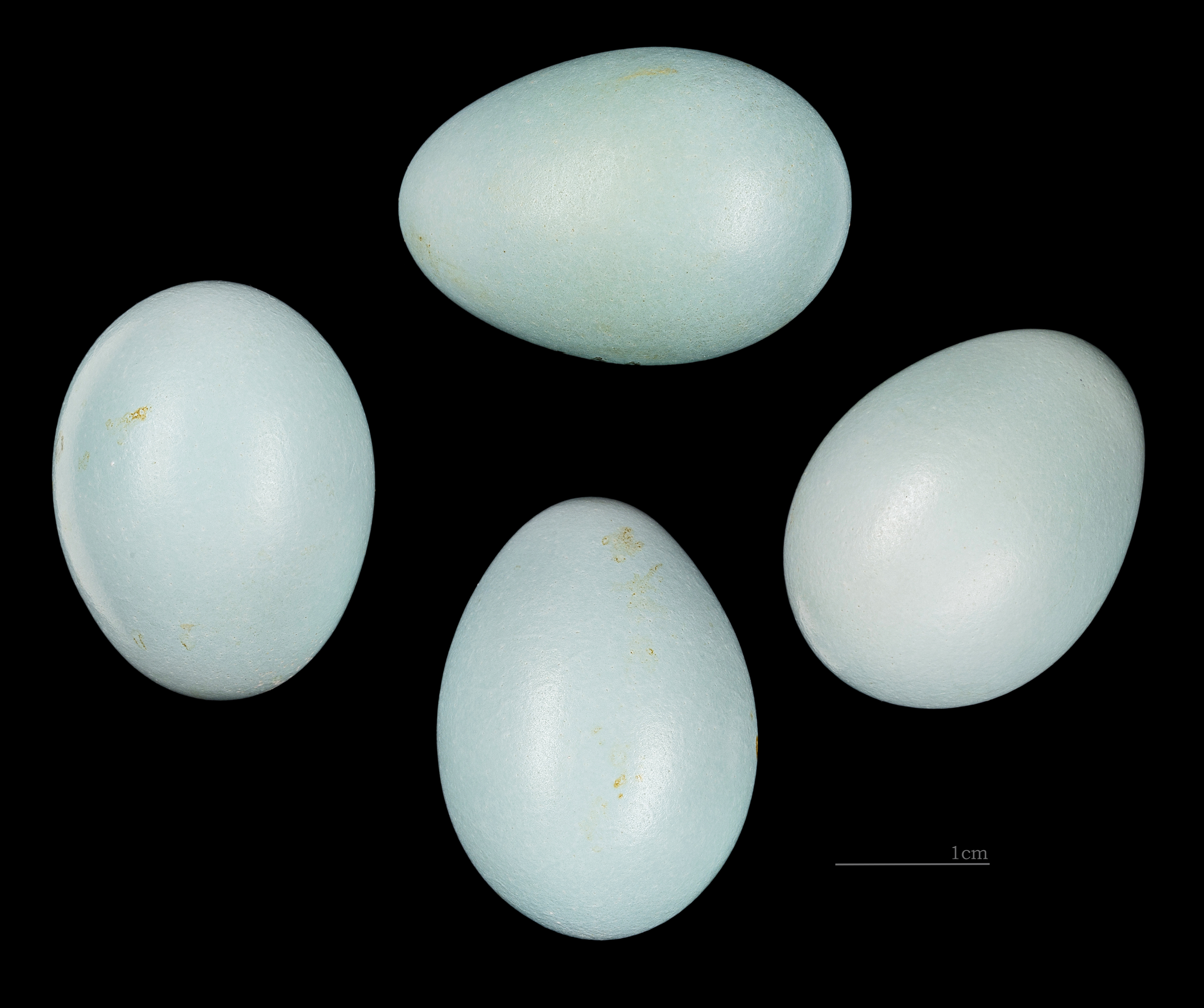
Eggs, MHNT

The masked laughingthrush (Pterorhinus perspicillatus) is a species of laughingthrush found in China, Vietnam, Hong Kong and Macau. It is often seen in small noisy flocks of seven. Its Chinese name qī zǐ-mèi (Chinese: 七姊妹 ) means 'seven brothers and sisters'.

== Taxonomy ==
The masked laughingthrush was formally described in 1789 by the German naturalist Johann Friedrich Gmelin in his revised and expanded edition of Carl Linnaeus's Systema Naturae. He placed it with the thrushes in the genus Turdus and coined the binomial name Turdus perspicillatus. The specific epithet perspicillatus is Modern Latin meaning "spectacled". Gmelin based his description on "Le Merle de la Chine" that had been described in 1775 by the French polymath Georges-Louis Leclerc, Comte de Buffon in his Histoire Naturelle des Oiseaux. A hand-coloured engraving by François-Nicolas Martinet was published to accompany Buffon's text. The type locality is now restricted to Xiamen (formerly Amoy) in the province of Fujian.

The masked laughingthrush was formerly placed in the genus Garrulax but following the publication of a comprehensive molecular phylogenetic study of the laughingthrushes in 2018, it was moved to the resurrected genus Pterorhinus that had been introduced by the English zoologist Robert Swinhoe in 1868. The species is monotypic: no subspecies are recognised.

== Behavior ==
This bird, like most others in its family, can often be seen foraging through undergrowth, especially in bamboo groves. Its vocalisations consist of a strident "pew!" call and various chattering noises.
