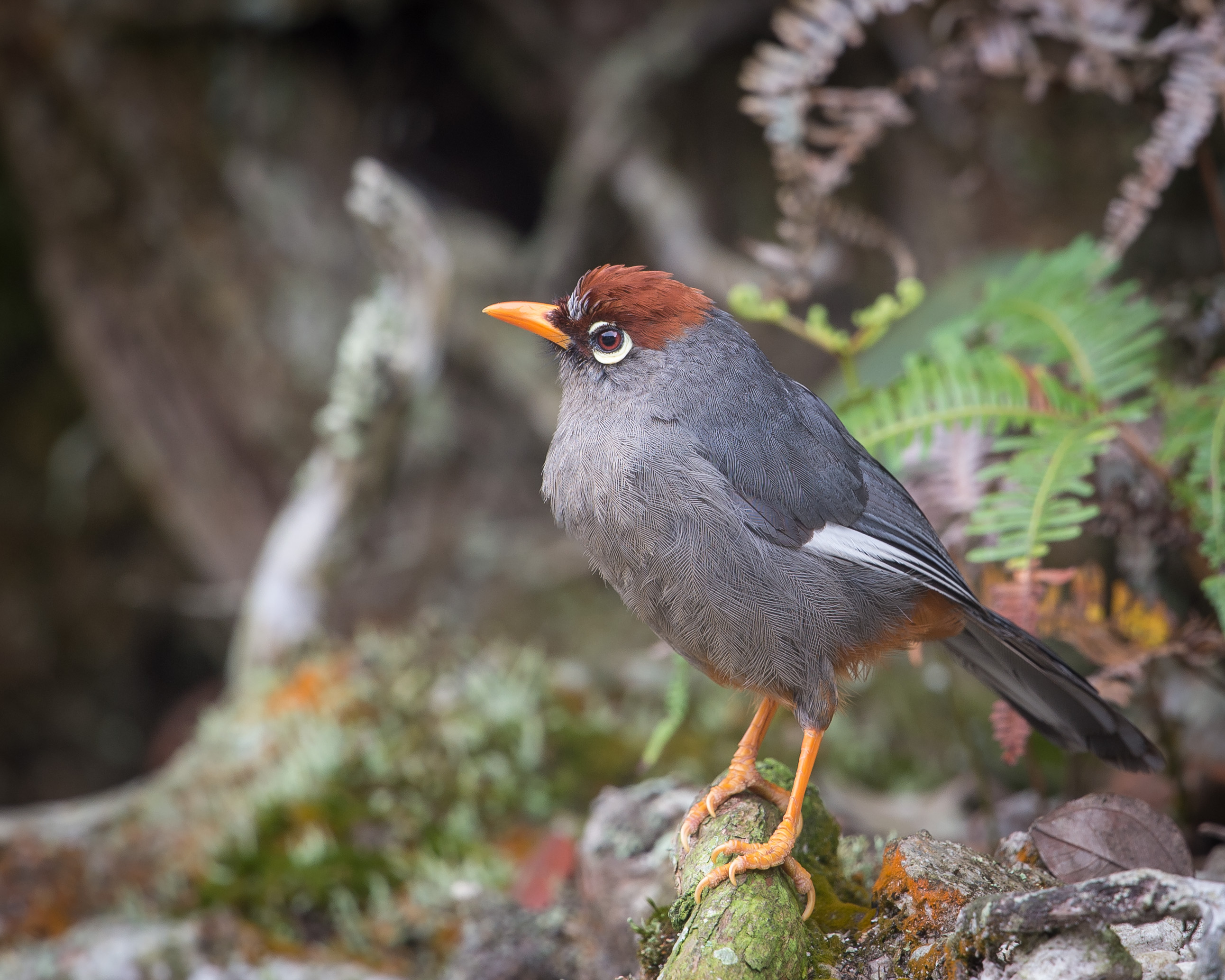
- Chestnut-capped laughingthrush (P. mitratus)

Scientific classification
- Kingdom: Animalia
- Phylum: Chordata
- Class: Aves
- Order: Passeriformes
- Family: Leiothrichidae
- Genus: Pterorhinus; Swinhoe, 1868

Type species
- Pterorhinus davidi Swinhoe, 1868

= Pterorhinus =

Genus of birds in the family Leiothrichidae

Pterorhinus is a genus of passerine birds in the laughingthrush family Leiothrichidae.

== Etymology ==
The name of the genus combines the Ancient Greek pteron meaning "feather" with rhinos meaning "nostrils".

== Taxonomy ==
The genus was erected by the English zoologist Robert Swinhoe in 1868 with the plain laughingthrush (Pterorhinus davidi) as the type species.

These species were at one time placed in Garrulax. In 2007, the genus Pterorhinus was resurrected to include Pterorhinus sannio and the type species Pterorhinus davidi. Following the publication of a molecular phylogenetic study in 2018, Garrulax was further split up and more species were moved to the genus Pterorhinus. At the same time, the four species previously placed in Babax were also moved to Pterorhinus.

=== Species ===
The genus contains 23 species:

Image	Scientific name	Common name	Distribution
	Pterorhinus albogularis	White-throated laughingthrush	Himalayas and China
	Pterorhinus berthemyi	Buffy laughingthrush	China
	Pterorhinus caerulatus	Grey-sided laughingthrush	eastern Himalayas
	Pterorhinus chinensis	Black-throated laughingthrush	Indochina and southern China
	Pterorhinus courtoisi	Blue-crowned laughingthrush	China
	Pterorhinus davidi	Plain laughingthrush	China
	Pterorhinus delesserti	Wayanad laughingthrush	Western Ghats
	Pterorhinus galbanus	Yellow-throated laughingthrush	Purvanchal Range
	Pterorhinus gularis	Rufous-vented laughingthrush	Eastern Himalaya and Laos
	Pterorhinus koslowi	Tibetan babax	eastern Tibet
	Pterorhinus lanceolatus	Chinese babax	China
	Pterorhinus mitratus	Chestnut-capped laughingthrush	montane Malay peninsula and Sumatra
	Pterorhinus nuchalis	Chestnut-backed laughingthrush	northeast India and northern Myanmar
	Pterorhinus parspicillatus	Masked laughingthrush	China and Vietnam
	Pterorhinus pectoralis	Greater necklaced laughingthrush	China, eastern Himalayas and northern Indochina
	Pterorhinus poecilorhynchus	Rusty laughingthrush	Taiwan
	Pterorhinus ruficeps	Rufous-crowned laughingthrush	Taiwan
	Pterorhinus ruficollis	Rufous-necked laughingthrush	Nepal, eastern Himalaya, Myanmar
	Pterorhinus sannio	White-browed laughingthrush	China, northeast India and northern Indochina
	Pterorhinus treacheri	Chestnut-hooded laughingthrush	montane Borneo
	Pterorhinus vassali	White-cheeked laughingthrush	southern Laos and Vietnam
	Pterorhinus waddelli	Giant babax	northeast India and southern Tibet
	Pterorhinus woodi	Mount Victoria babax	Lushai and Chin hills
