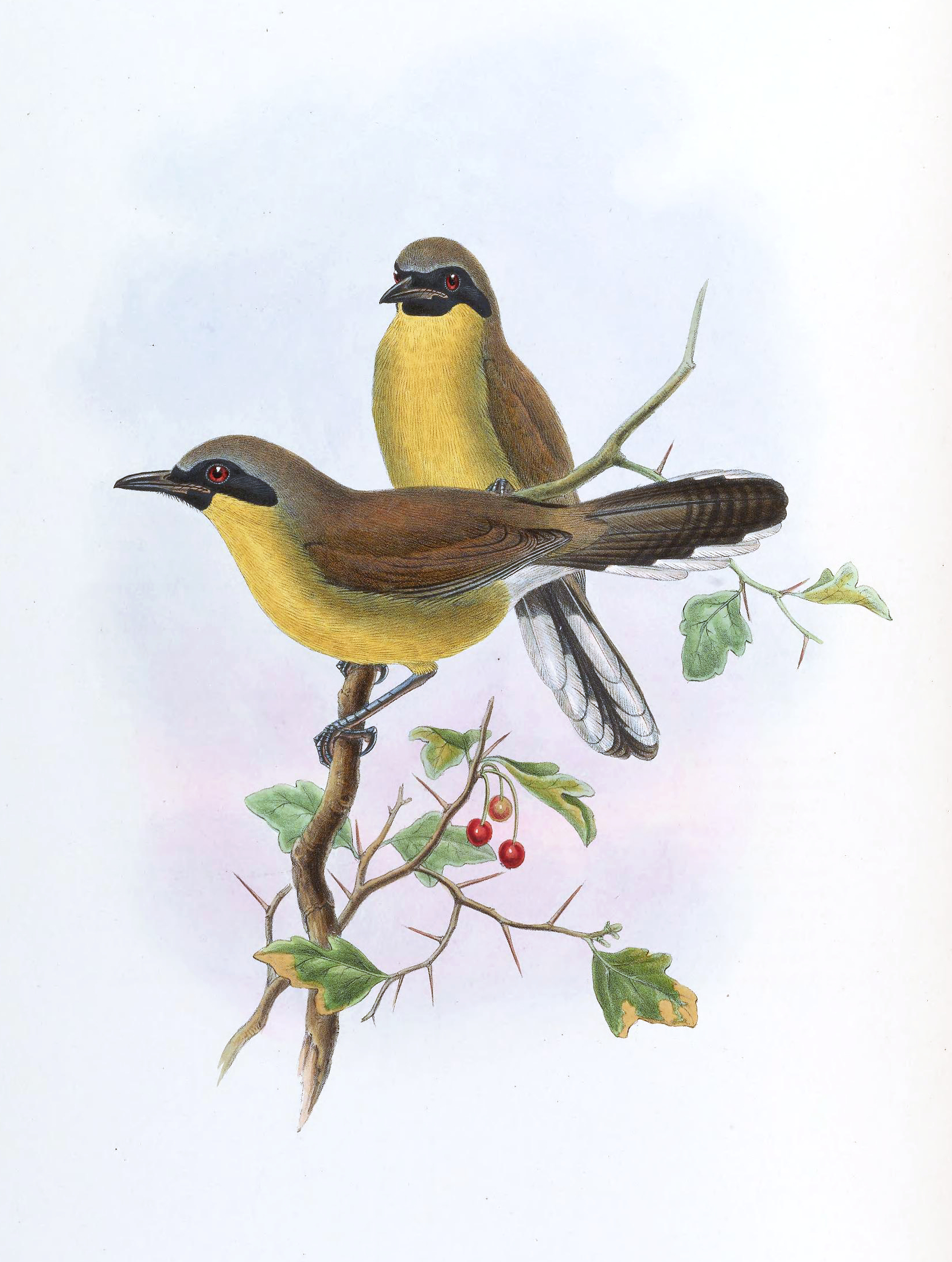
- Illustration by John Gould and William Matthew Hart. The crown and nape should actually be light grey.

Conservation status
- Least Concern (IUCN 3.1)

Scientific classification
- Kingdom: Animalia
- Phylum: Chordata
- Class: Aves
- Order: Passeriformes
- Family: Leiothrichidae
- Genus: Pterorhinus
- Species: P. galbanus

Binomial name
- Pterorhinus galbanus (Godwin-Austen, 1874)

Synonyms
- Ianthocincla galbana Garrulax galbanus

= Yellow-throated laughingthrush =

Species of bird

The yellow-throated laughingthrush (Pterorhinus galbanus) is a species of bird in the family Leiothrichidae. It is found in grassy areas with bushes and trees, scrub and forest in the Patkai mountain range. Until recently, it included the blue-crowned laughingthrush as a subspecies, but unlike that species the crown of the yellow-throated laughingthrush is pale grey (not bluish).

The yellow-throated laughingthrush was formerly placed in the genus Garrulax but following the publication of a comprehensive molecular phylogenetic study in 2018, it was moved to the resurrected genus Pterorhinus.
