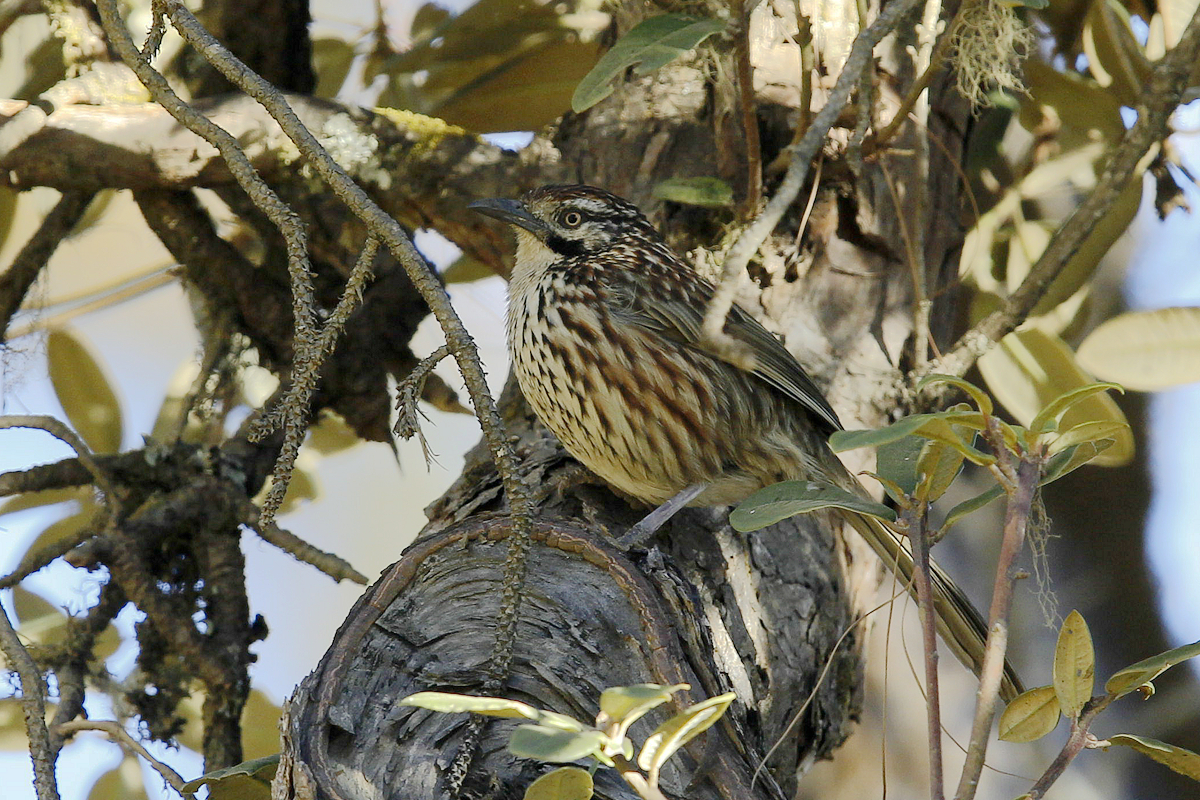

Conservation status
- Least Concern (IUCN 3.1)

Scientific classification
- Kingdom: Animalia
- Phylum: Chordata
- Class: Aves
- Order: Passeriformes
- Family: Leiothrichidae
- Genus: Pterorhinus
- Species: P. lanceolatus

Binomial name
- Pterorhinus lanceolatus Verreaux, J, 1871

Synonyms
- Ianthocincla lanceolata Babax lanceolatus

= Chinese babax =

Species of bird

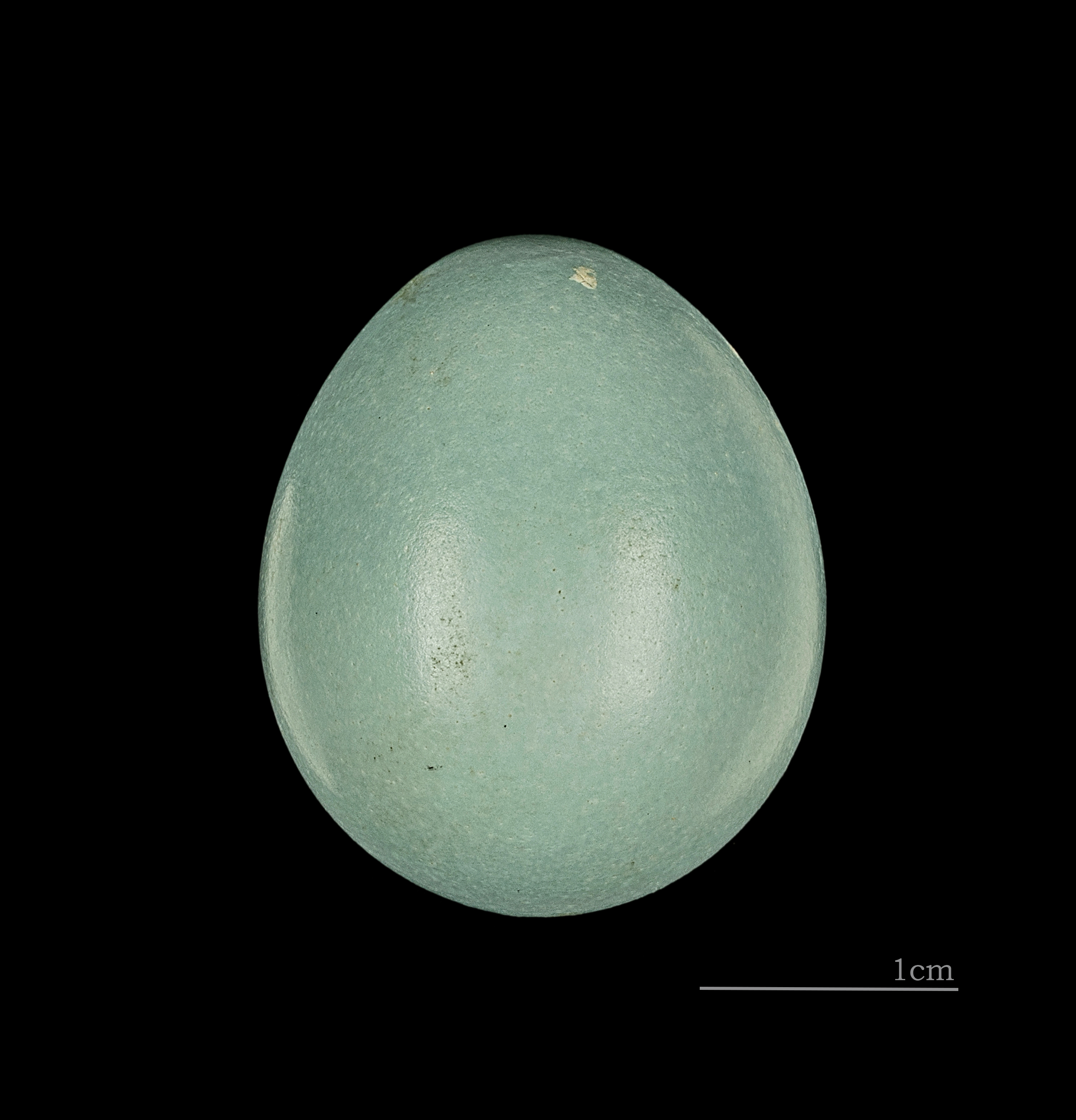
Egg, MHNT

The Chinese babax (Pterorhinus lanceolatus) is a species of bird in the family Leiothrichidae. It is found in China, Hong Kong, India, and Myanmar. Its natural habitats are subtropical or tropical moist lowland forests and subtropical or tropical moist montane forests.

This species was formerly placed in the genus Babax but following the publication of a comprehensive molecular phylogenetic study in 2018, it was moved to the resurrected genus Pterorhinus.
