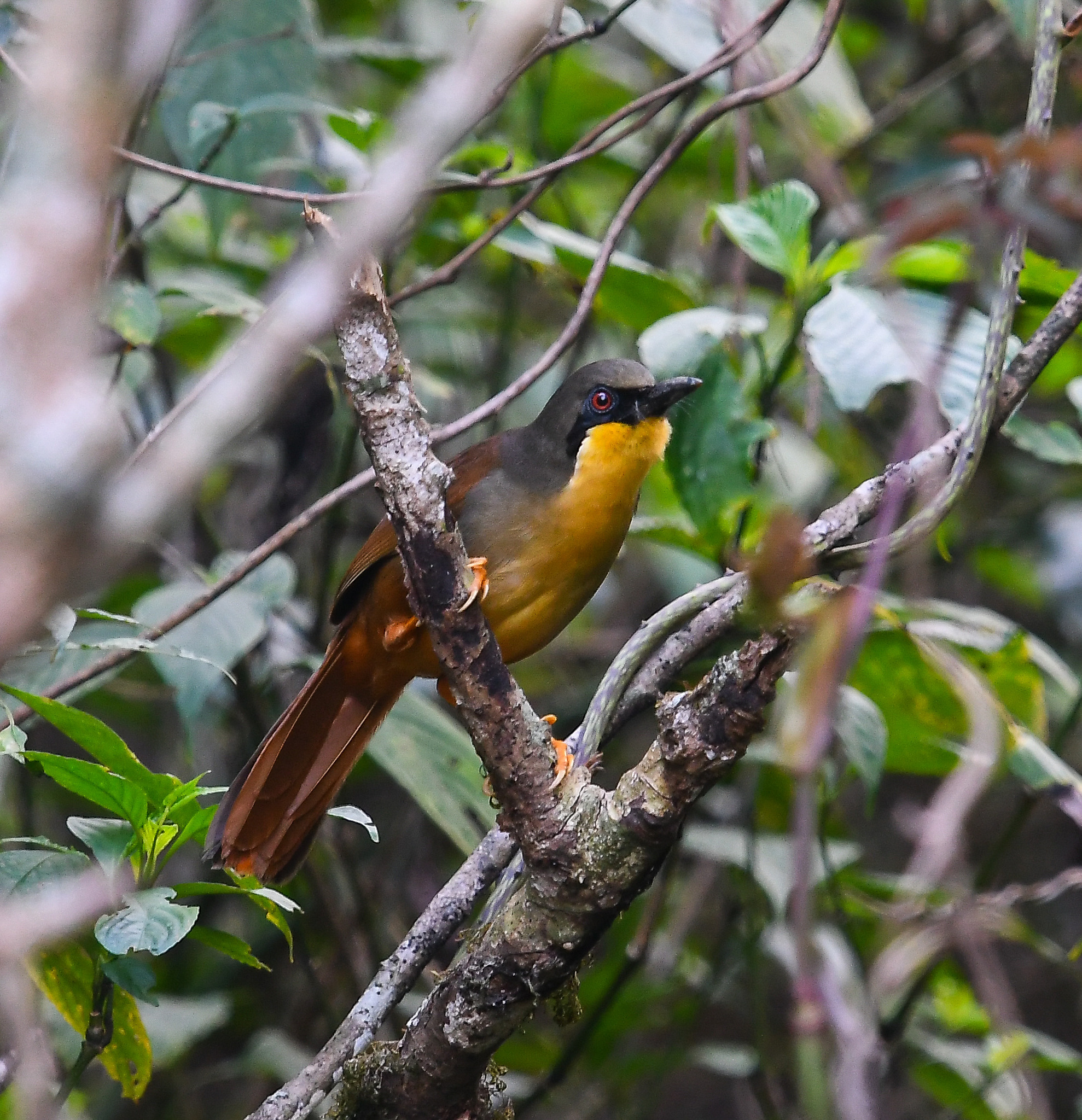

Conservation status
- Least Concern (IUCN 3.1)

Scientific classification
- Kingdom: Animalia
- Phylum: Chordata
- Class: Aves
- Order: Passeriformes
- Family: Leiothrichidae
- Genus: Pterorhinus
- Species: P. gularis

Binomial name
- Pterorhinus gularis (McClelland, 1840)

Synonyms
- Dryonastes gularis Ianthocincla gularis Garrulax gularis

= Rufous-vented laughingthrush =

Species of bird

The rufous-vented laughingthrush (Pterorhinus gularis) is a species of bird in the family Leiothrichidae. It is found in Bangladesh, Bhutan, India, Laos, Myanmar, and Vietnam. Its natural habitats are subtropical or tropical moist lowland forest and subtropical or tropical moist montane forest.

This species was formerly placed in the genus Garrulax but following the publication of a comprehensive molecular phylogenetic study in 2018, it was moved to the resurrected genus Pterorhinus.
