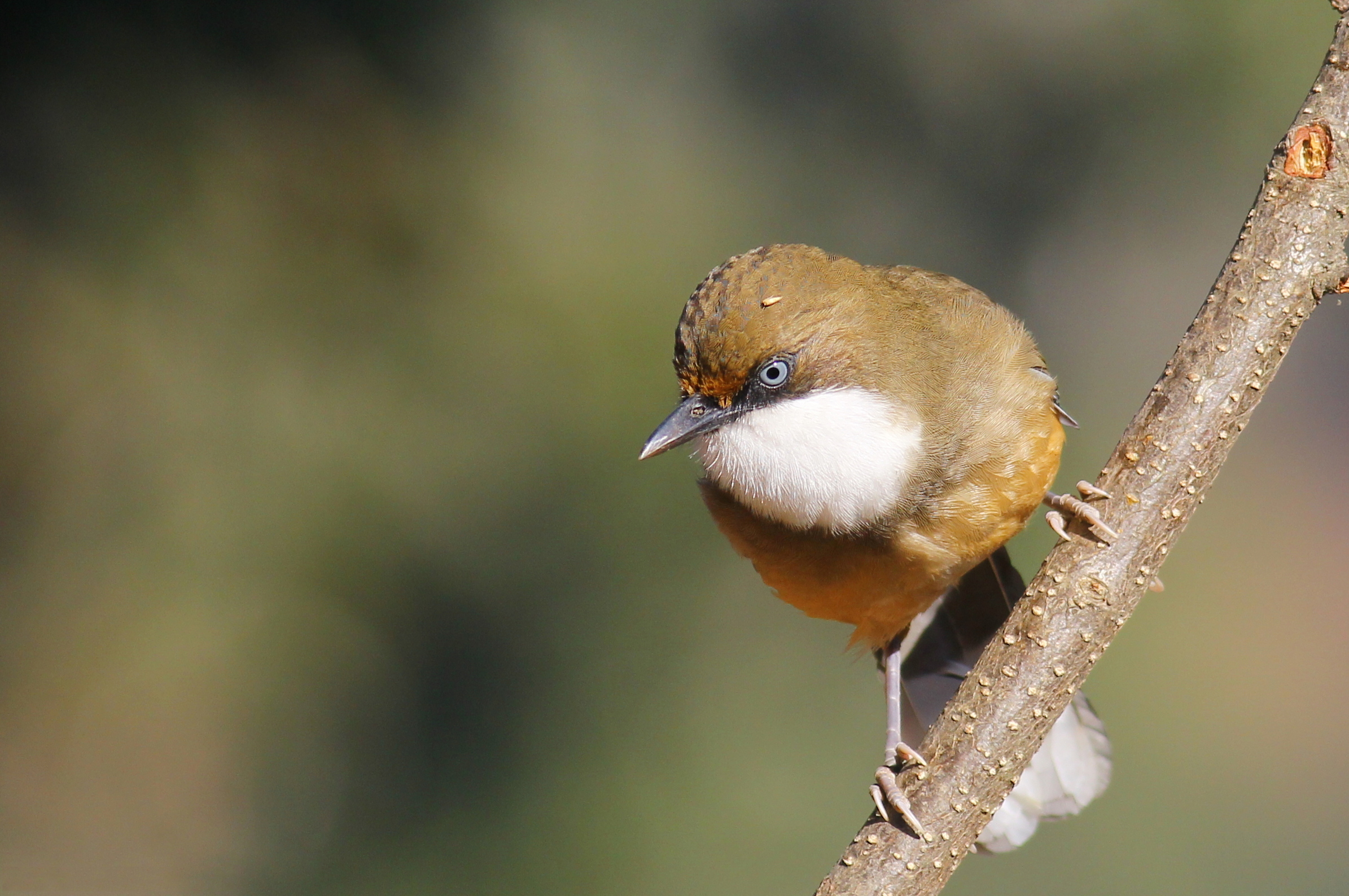
- at Bhimtal, Uttarakhand, India

Conservation status
- Least Concern (IUCN 3.1)

Scientific classification
- Kingdom: Animalia
- Phylum: Chordata
- Class: Aves
- Order: Passeriformes
- Family: Leiothrichidae
- Genus: Pterorhinus
- Species: P. albogularis

Binomial name
- Pterorhinus albogularis (Gould, 1836)

Synonyms
- Ianthocincla albogularis Garrulax albogularis

= White-throated laughingthrush =

Species of bird

The white-throated laughingthrush (Pterorhinus albogularis) is a species of passerine bird in the family Leiothrichidae. It is found mainly in the northern regions of the Indian subcontinent, primarily the Himalayas, and some adjoining and disjunct areas. It ranges across Afghanistan, Bhutan, India, Myanmar, Nepal, Tibet and Vietnam. Its natural habitat is subtropical or tropical moist montane forests.

This species was formerly placed in the genus Garrulax but following the publication of a comprehensive molecular phylogenetic study in 2018, it was moved to the resurrected genus Pterorhinus.

== Gallery ==
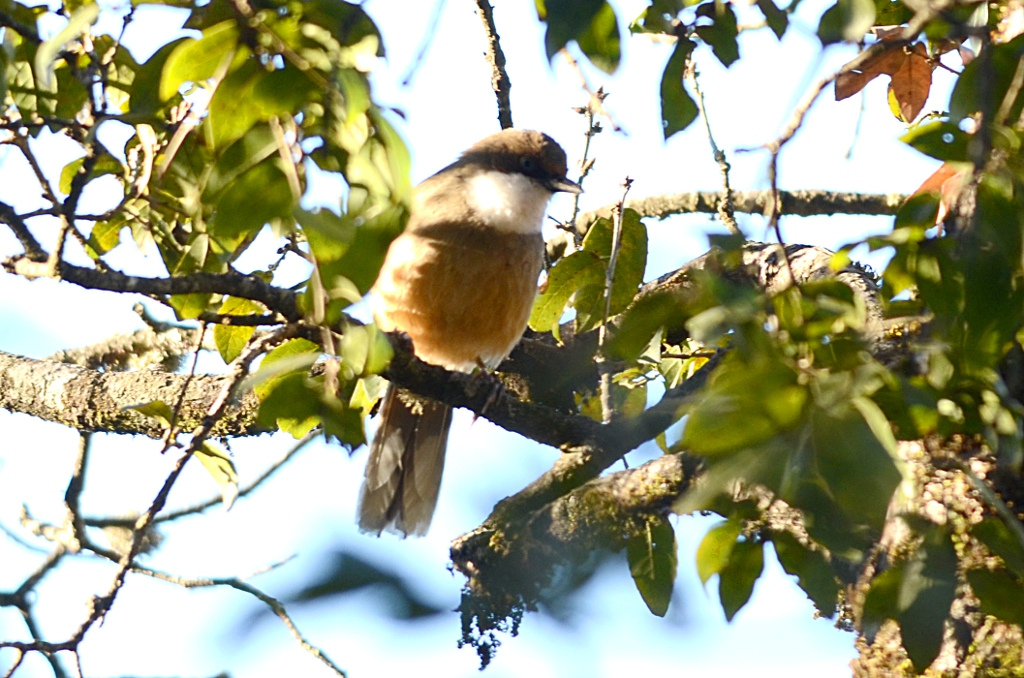
White-throated laughingthrush at Uttarakhand, India

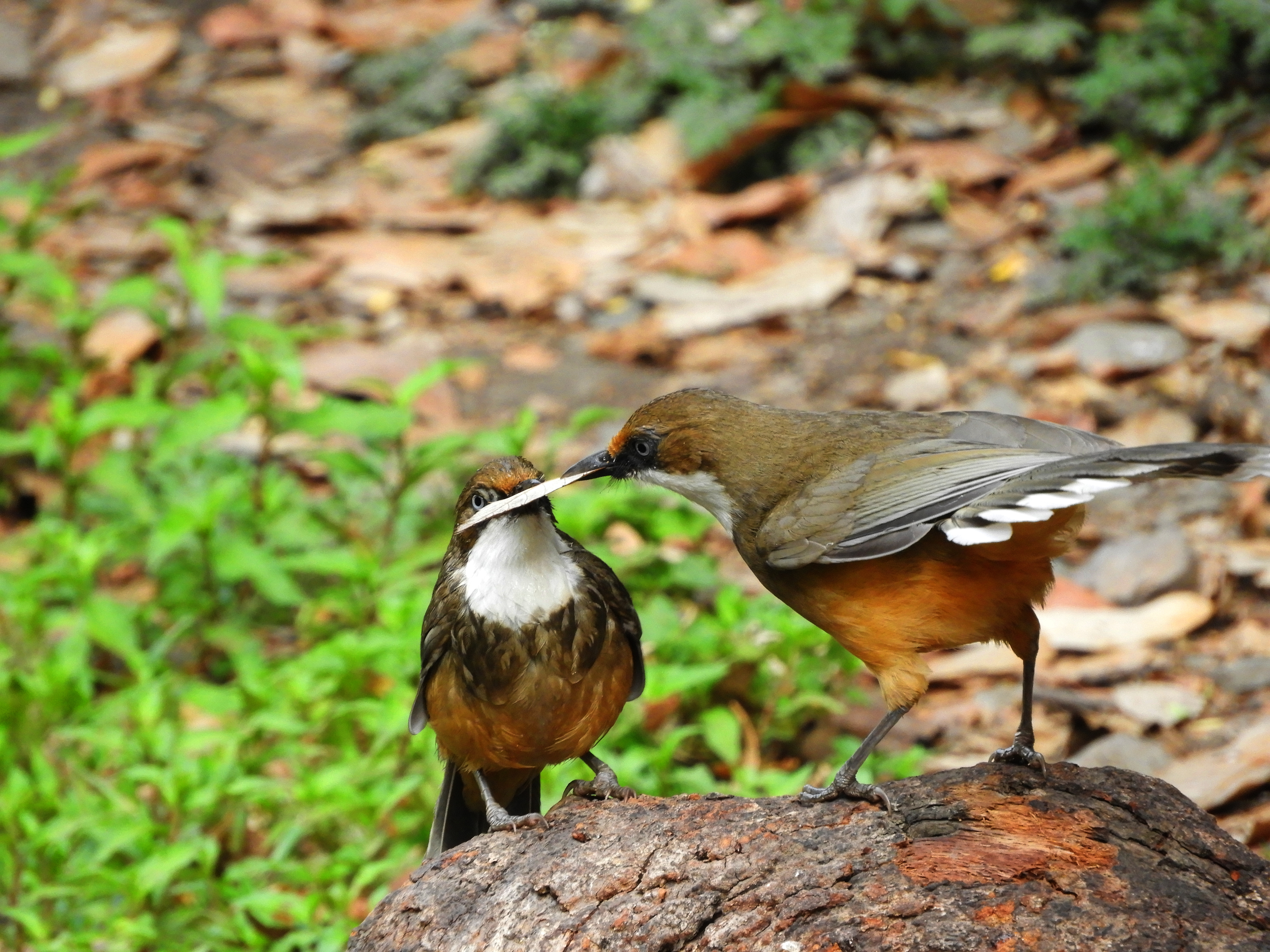
White-throated Laughingthrush transferring nesting material at Sattal, Kumaon division of Uttarakhand

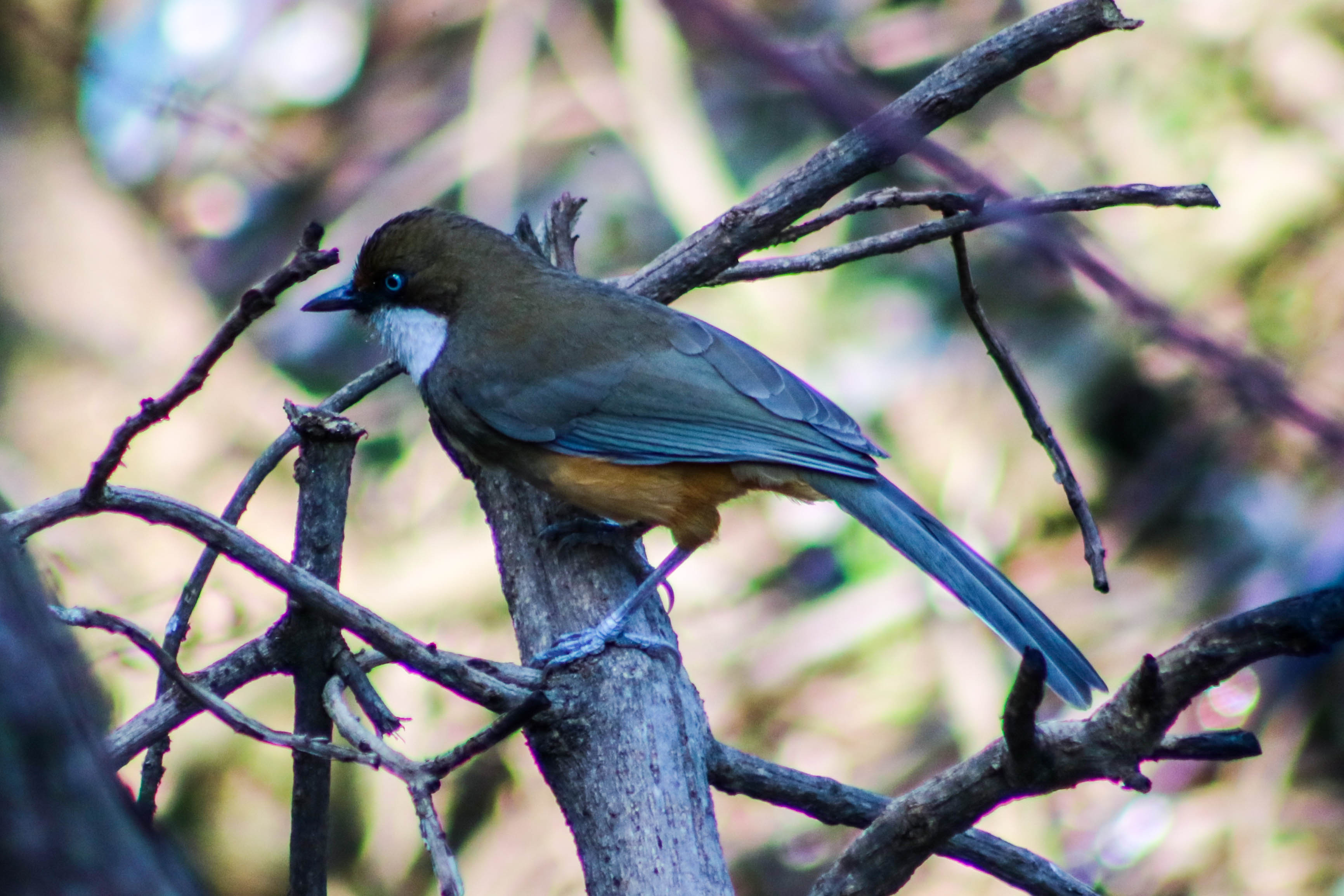
At Nagarkot, Nepal
