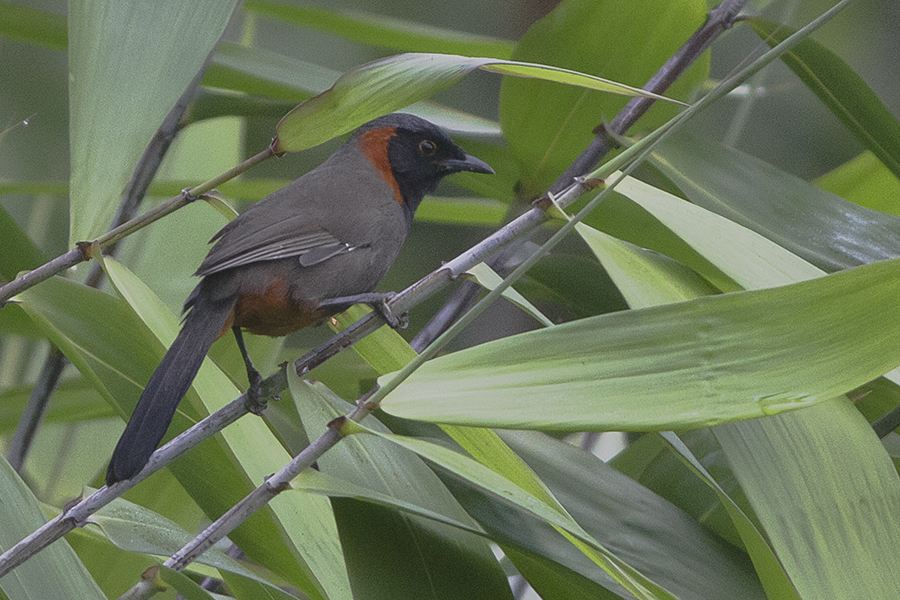
- From Mahananda Wildlife Sanctuary in West Bengal, India.

Conservation status
- Least Concern (IUCN 3.1)

Scientific classification
- Kingdom: Animalia
- Phylum: Chordata
- Class: Aves
- Order: Passeriformes
- Family: Leiothrichidae
- Genus: Pterorhinus
- Species: P. ruficollis

Binomial name
- Pterorhinus ruficollis (Jardine & Selby, 1838)

Synonyms
- Ianthocincla ruficollis Garrulax ruficollis

= Rufous-necked laughingthrush =

Species of bird

The rufous-necked laughingthrush (Pterorhinus ruficollis) is a bird species in the laughingthrush family, Leiothrichidae. It is found in Bangladesh, Bhutan, China, India, Myanmar and Nepal, where its natural habitats are subtropical or tropical moist lowland forest and subtropical or tropical moist montane forest. Little study was done on this species due to its abundance and lack of interest in its conservation.

== Taxonomy ==
The rufous-necked laughingthrush was placed in the genus Dryonastes before being moved to Garrulax. Following the publication of a comprehensive molecular phylogenetic study in 2018, it was moved again to the resurrected genus Pterorhinus.

== Description ==
The rufous-necked laughingthrush is actually not a thrush but a species of babbler, it is roughly 22–27 centimetres (8.7–10.6 in) in length and weighs anywhere between 51–73 grams (1.8–2.6 oz). The rufous-necked laughingthrush as its name implies has a rustic color around its neck. overall the bird is grey with a black face and its rufous neck. Due to the fact that they are non migratory birds this means that they molt very slowly which means that they look the same as young birds than as older birds. The rufous-necked laughingthrush looks very similar to a rufous-cheeked laughingthrush yet the regions where both species are found are completely different.

== Habitat and Distribution ==
The rufous-necked laughingthrush is found in the subtropical or tropical moist forests from Nepal to China extending down into Myanmar. It is a non migratory songbird which means it spends its entire life in the same location or habitat for both reproductive and non reproductive periods. Some populations are found in isolated regions of Nepal likely something that happened during the formation of the mountain ranges in the region. The species is commonly found in all of its native ranges and is considered of least concern by the IUCN redlist.

== Behavior ==
=== Vocalization ===
The vocalization of this laughingthrush is a series of small chirps that ramble in out of order note calls which resemble mocking bird calls that simulate some babbling or laughing as the name describes. Its quick whip calls are easily recognizable especially in larger flocks of feeding groups.

=== Diet ===
Rufous-necked laughingthrush generally feed on insects but have generalist bills and can feed on seeds molluscs and berries as well. Due to this generalist feeding behavior food sources are not as difficult to come by for these laughingthrushes as they are for specialists.

=== Reproduction ===
Rufous-necked laughing thrush have not been studied for their reproduction but it is assumed that they reproduce similarly to other laughing thrushes. Their intelligence makes it difficult for parasitic reproducers like cuckoos to take advantage of them. Their egg recognition is very good and therefore can remove intrusive eggs that don't resemble theirs at all. In terms of mating rufous-necked laughingthrushes tend to are sexually dimorphic in size and it may be linked to the female choice of individuals with the best territorial defense and therefore size was probably selected over time. They breed from March to August, creating small cup nests that are compact and made of leaves and grasses.
