= Chestnut-backed laughingthrush =

Conservation status
- Near Threatened (IUCN 3.1)

Scientific classification
- Kingdom: Animalia
- Phylum: Chordata
- Class: Aves
- Order: Passeriformes
- Family: Leiothrichidae
- Genus: Pterorhinus
- Species: P. nuchalis

Binomial name
- Pterorhinus nuchalis (Godwin-Austen, 1876)

Synonyms
- Ianthocincla nuchalis Garrulax nuchalis

Species of bird

The chestnut-backed laughingthrush (Pterorhinus nuchalis) is a species of bird in the family Leiothrichidae. It is found in Northeast India and northern Myanmar. This species inhabits secondary growth, thickets, tall grasslands with scattered shrubs or dense bushes in stony scrub-covered ravines and hills, from the lowlands up to around 900 metres (3,000 ft). It is threatened by habitat loss.

The chestnut-backed laughingthrush was at one time placed in the genus Garrulax but following the publication of a comprehensive molecular phylogenetic study in 2018, it was moved to the resurrected genus Pterorhinus.
