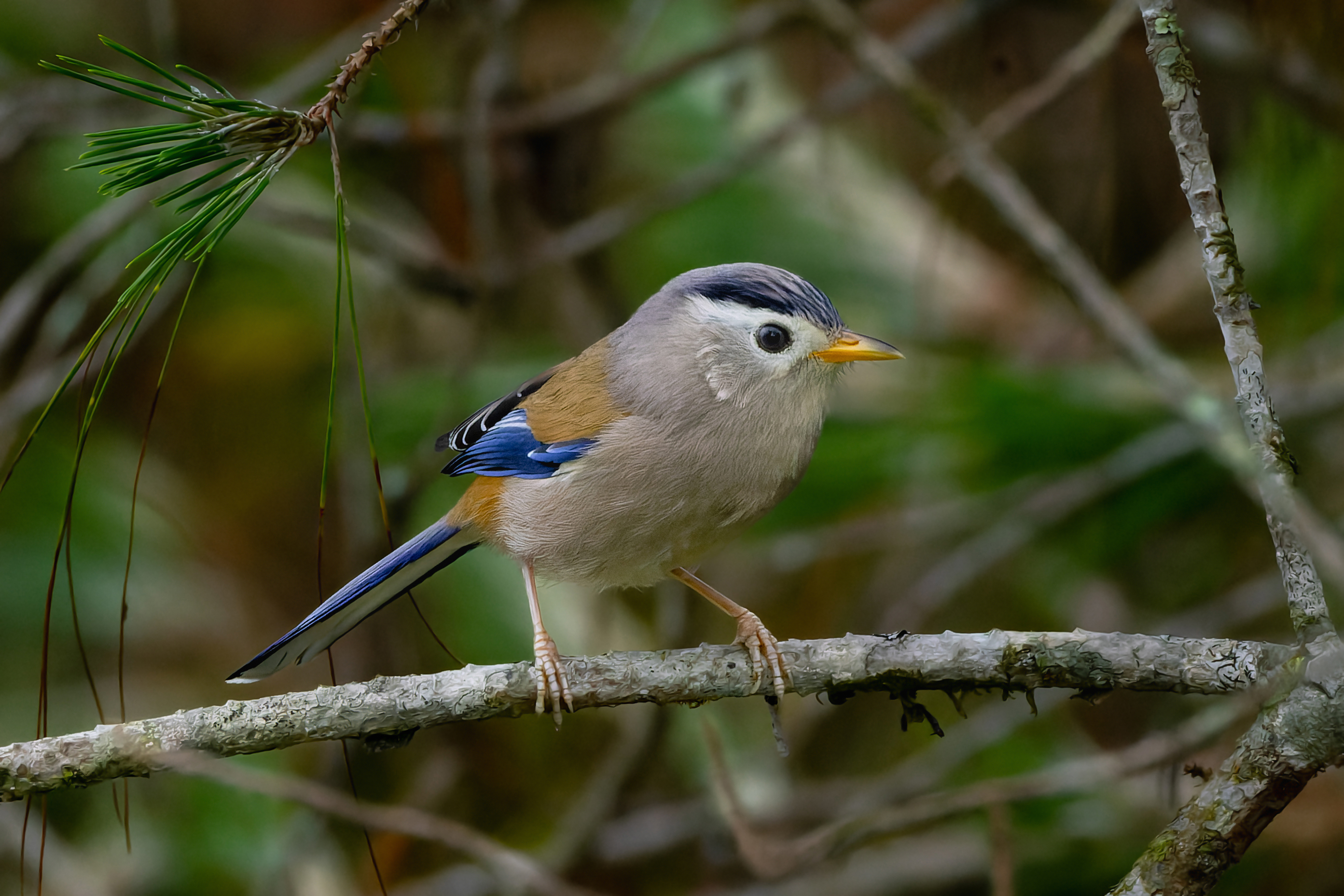
- Actinodura cyanouroptera in Lava, West Bengal, India.

Conservation status
- Least Concern (IUCN 3.1)

Scientific classification
- Kingdom: Animalia
- Phylum: Chordata
- Class: Aves
- Order: Passeriformes
- Family: Leiothrichidae
- Genus: Actinodura
- Species: A. cyanouroptera

Binomial name
- Actinodura cyanouroptera (Hodgson, 1837)

Synonyms
- Siva cyanouroptera Minla cyanouroptera

= Blue-winged minla =

Species of bird

The blue-winged minla (Actinodura cyanouroptera), also known as the blue-winged siva, is a species of bird in the family Leiothrichidae.

It has in the past been placed in the genus Minla and also in the monotypic Siva.

It is found in the Indian subcontinent and Southeast Asia, ranging across Bangladesh, Bhutan, Cambodia, China, India, Laos, Malaysia, Myanmar, Nepal, Thailand, Tibet, and Vietnam. Its natural habitat is subtropical or tropical moist montane forests.

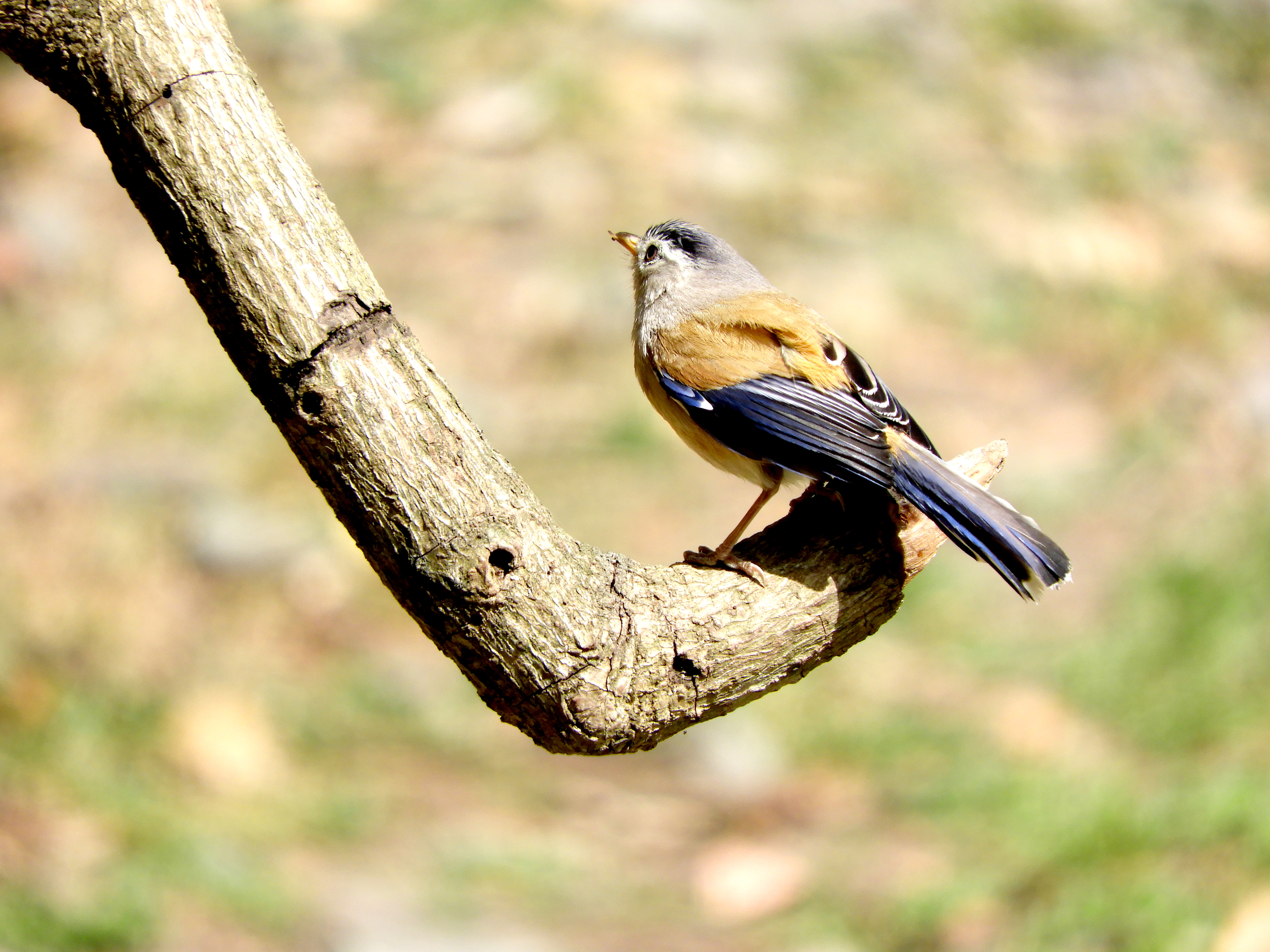
At Sattal, Kumaon, India
