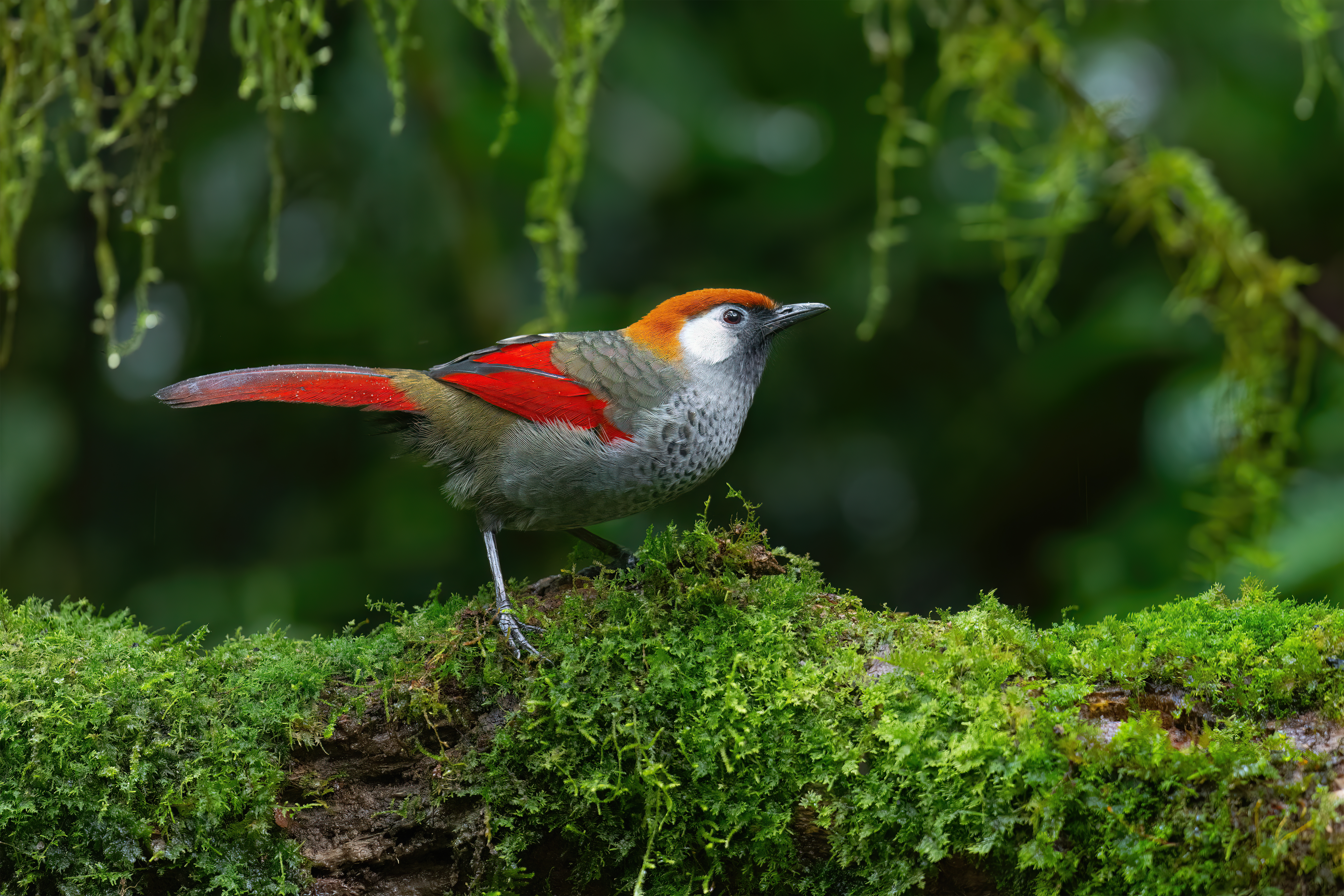
- Red-tailed laughingthrush

Scientific classification
- Kingdom: Animalia
- Phylum: Chordata
- Class: Aves
- Order: Passeriformes
- Superfamily: Sylvioidea
- Family: Leiothrichidae; Swainson, 1832

Genera
- 17; see article text

= Laughingthrush =

Family of birds

The laughingthrushes and their allies are a family, Leiothrichidae, of Old World passerine birds. The entire family used to be included in the Old World babbler family Timaliidae. The family contains 143 species and is divided into 17 genera. The species are diverse in size and coloration. These are birds of mostly subtropical and tropical areas, with the greatest variety in Southeast Asia and the Indian subcontinent, although the plain laughingthrush extends into the Palearctic with others like the Emei Shan liocichla inhabiting cold highland areas.

They are small to medium-sized birds. They have strong legs, and many are quite terrestrial. They typically have generalised bills, similar to those of a thrush. Most have predominantly brown plumage, with minimal difference between the sexes, but many more brightly coloured species also exist.

This group is not strongly migratory, and most species have short rounded wings, and a weak flight. They live in lightly wooded or scrubland environments, ranging from swamp to desert. They are primarily insectivorous, although many will also take berries, and the larger species will even eat small lizards and other vertebrates.

== Taxonomy ==
The family Leiothrichidae was introduced (as a subfamily Leiotrichanae) by the English naturalist William Swainson in 1832, based on the genus Leiothrix. However, for much of the 20th century, the genera that now comprise the family were all placed in the large Old World babbler family Timaliidae. This family was a notorious wastebasket taxon into which Old World insectivores were placed when they could not be placed anywhere else. The French ornithologist Jean Théodore Delacour developed the most influential revision of the family, published in 1946 and 1950. His review, based on plumage colour and bill shape, identified five tribes with the Timaliidae, of which Turdoidini contained many of the genera now assigned to Leiothrichidae, including Garrulax, Liocichla, Turdoides. Other genera assigned to the tribe are now assigned to other babbler families, such as Yuhina, now in the Zosteropidae, or even less closely related, such as Pteruthius, now known to be a vireo. The next major revision was the Sibley–Ahlquist taxonomy of birds developed using DNA–DNA hybridisation. This study removed some groups from the wider Timaliidae, and found the laughingthrushes in the genus Garrulax to be the sister taxon to the rest of the family. This work was limited in that it only examined 11 species and 9 genera. The next major study of the group was in 2003, when a team led by Alice Cibois examined the DNA sequence data of the babblers. The study found that the Garrulax was polyphyletic, and that the laughinghthrushes in general formed a clade with the genera Turdoides, Leiothrix and Cutia.

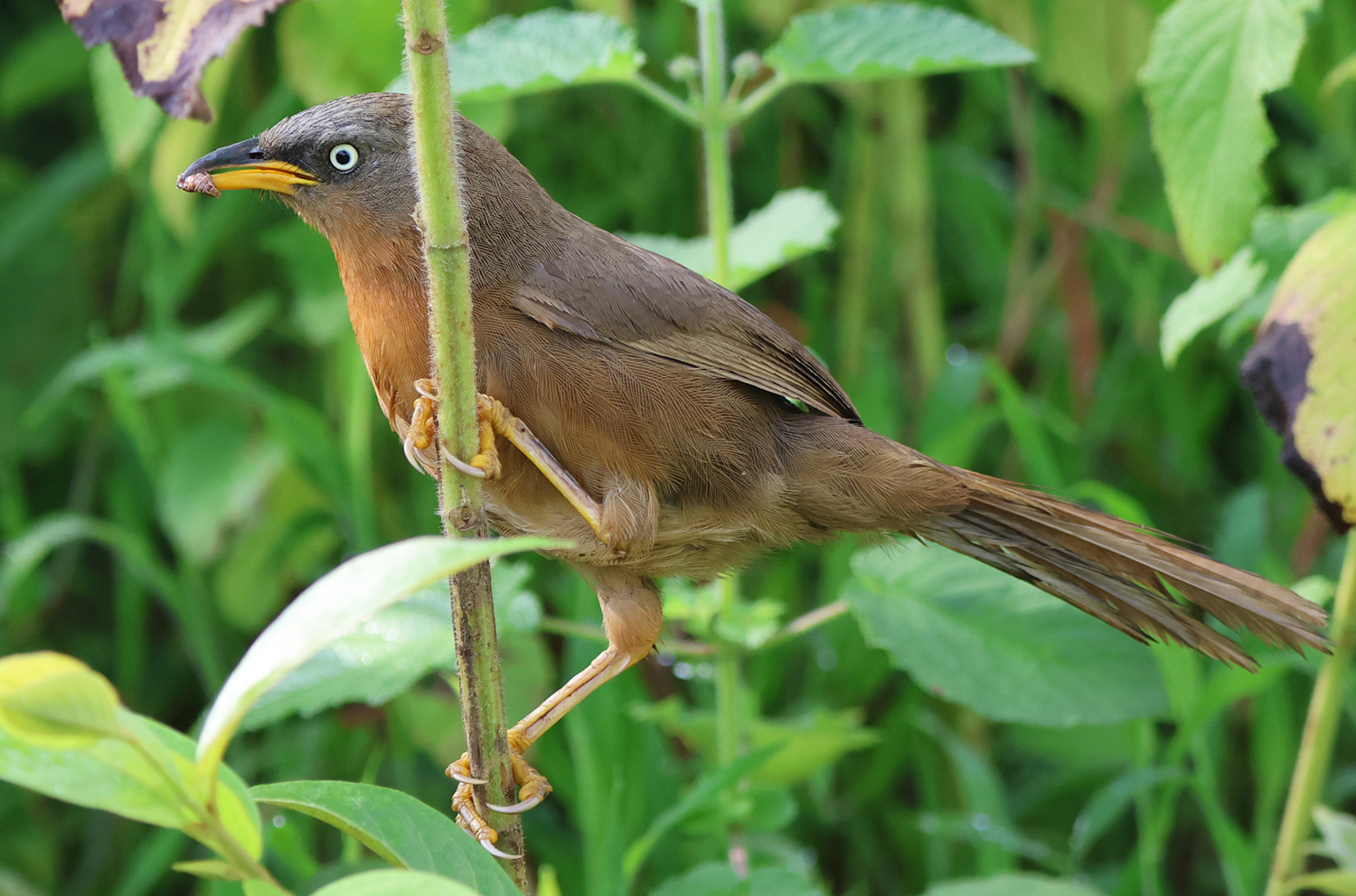
The rufous babbler was moved from the genus Turdoides to Argya.

A comprehensive molecular phylogenetic study of the family published in 2018 led to substantial revision of the taxonomic classification. The laughingthrushes in the genus Garrulax were found to belong to three separate clades that had diverged in the Miocene 7–9 million year ago. The genus was therefore split, with Garrulax restricted to one clade, and the genera Pterorhinus and Ianthocincla resurrected for the other two clades. The genus Turdoides was also split, and several species moved into the resurrected genus Argya. A year earlier, the four species of laughingthrushes endemic to the Western Ghats in India were separated into a new genus Montecincla.

In a separate change, the crocias were moved to the genus Laniellus Swainson, 1832, an older name which has priority over Crocias Temminck, 1836.

The cladogram below showing the phylogenetic relationship of the Leiothrichidae to other families is based on a study of the babblers by Tianlong Cai and collaborators published in 2019. The inclusion of the genus Alcippe in Leiothrichidae remains uncertain after these studies; the molecular studies variously place the genus as the sister to the ground babblers in Pellorneidae, or in Leiothrichidae. The Alcippe fulvettas are smaller than the rest of the laughingthrush family, but also more arboreal and have weaker legs than the ground babblers; on that basis Cai placed them in their own new family, Alcippeidae.

- - - Pycnonotidae – bulbuls (161 species)
    - - - Sylviidae – sylviid warblers (32 species)
        - Paradoxornithidae – parrotbills and allies (38 species)
      - - Zosteropidae – white-eyes (147 species)
        - - Timaliidae – tree babblers (58 species)
          - - Pellorneidae – ground babblers (65 species)
            - Leiothrichidae – laughingthrushes and allies (143 species)

The cladogram below shows the phylogenetic relationships between the genera in the family Leiothrichidae based on a study by Alice Cibois and collaborators published in 2018.

- Leiothrichidae
  - Alcippe – fulvettas (10 species)
  - - - - Grammatoptila – striated laughingthrush
        - - Cutia – cutia (2 species)
          - Laniellus – crocias (2 species)
      - - - Trochalopteron – laughingthrushes (19 species)
          - - Montecincla – laughingthrushes (4 species)
            - - Actinodura – barwings (9 species)
              - - - Minla – red-tailed minla
                  - Leioptila – rufous-backed sibia
                - - Leiothrix – Leiothrix and mesia (2 species)
                  - - Liocichla – liocichlas (5 species)
                    - Heterophasia – sibias (7 species)
        - - - Argya – babblers (16 species)
            - Turdoides – babblers (19 species)
          - - Garrulax – laughingthrushes and the hwamei (14 species)
            - - Ianthocincla – laughingthrushes (8 species)
              - Pterorhinus – laughingthrushes and babaxes (23 species)

== Distribution and habitat ==
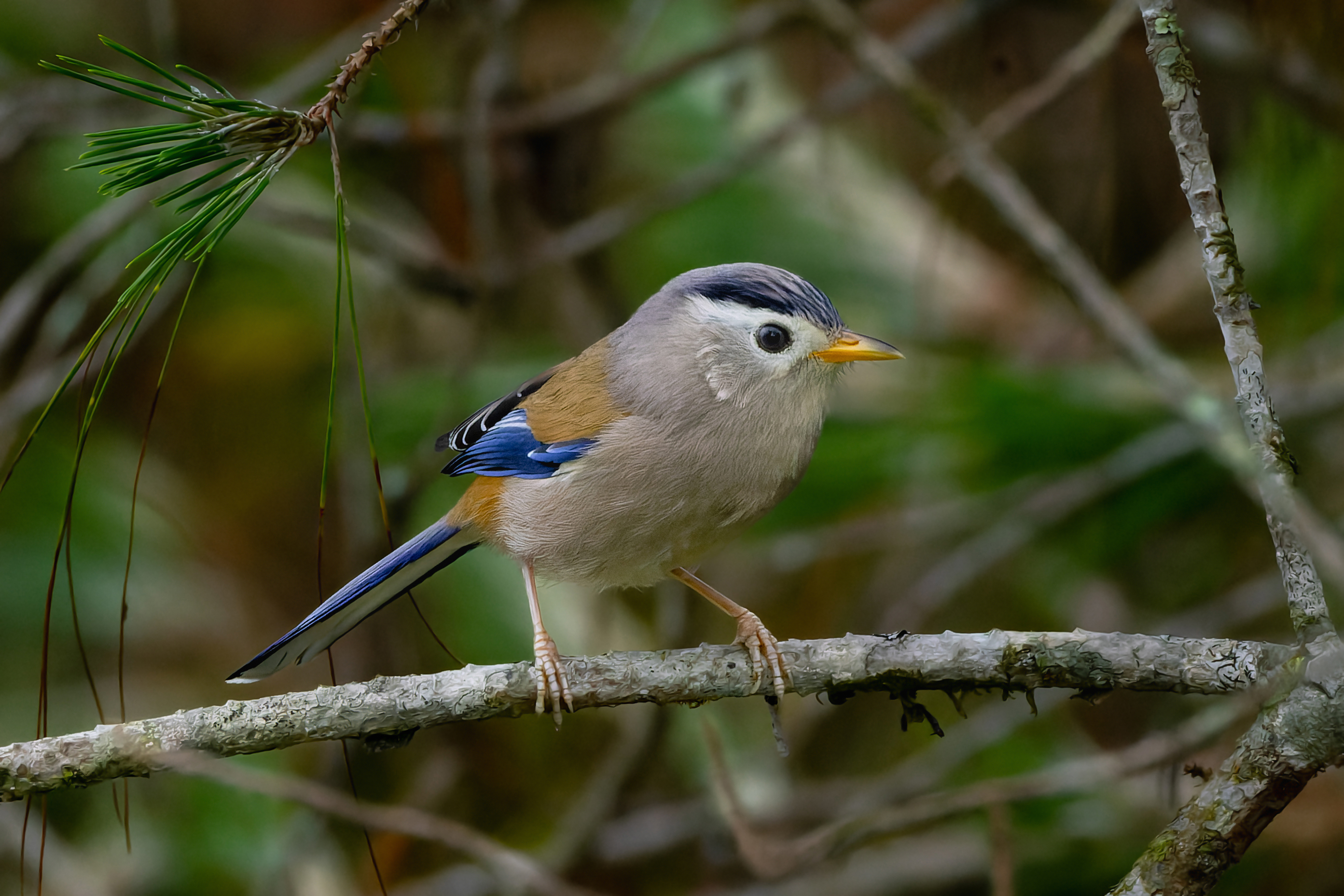
The blue-winged minla is an altitudinal migrant.

The laughingthrushes and allies are found in the tropics of Africa, the Middle East, through to South Asia, Southeast Asia and Eastern Asia, with some species reaching temperate climates in East Asia. They are predominantly woodland and forest birds, but some species are found in scrub and savanna, particularly birds in the genus Argya and Turdoides. They reach their greatest diversity in the Himalayas and South East Asia.

Like the other families of birds that are treated as Old World babblers, the Leiothrichidae do not undertake long distance migration, although some species do undertake shorter or irregular migrations. Some African species in the genus Turdoides will move in response to rains or drought. Several montane species display altitudinal migration, including the red-tailed minla, blue-winged minla, streaked barwing and red-billed leiothrix. The latter will migrates down from higher forest in the Himalayas in November before returning in late April.

Some species of the family have been introduced outside their native range. For example, the Chinese hwamei, a popular cagebird, has been accidentally introduced to several countries and states including Japan, where it is expanding its range. It was even deliberately introduced to California, although that introduction failed. The red-billed leiothrix has been widely introduced across Europe, Hawaii, Reunion Island and Japan, and is considered a pest due to its tendency to spread non-native plants, compete with local species and acting as a reservoir for avian malaria.

== Description ==
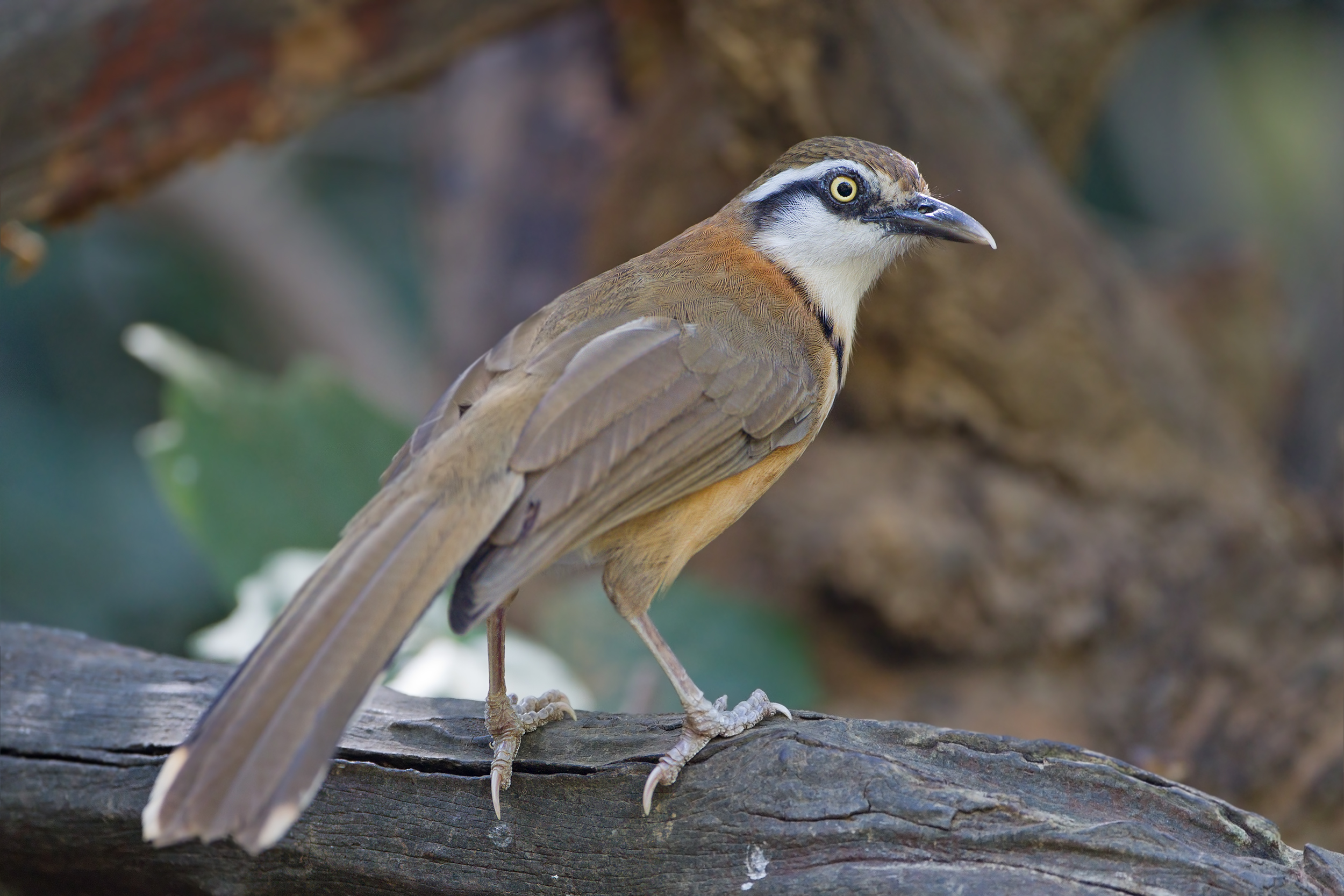
The plumage of the lesser necklaced laughingthrush mimics that of the greater necklaced laughingthrush.

The laughingthrushes and their allies are small to medium-sized songbirds that are generally larger and longer-tailed than species in the other babbler families (Pellorneidae and Timaliidae). They range in size from the largest, the greater necklaced laughingthrush, which can be up to 34 cm (13 in) in length and weigh up to 170 g (6.0 oz), to the fulvettas in the genus Alcippe like the Nepal fulvetta, which is only 12.5 cm (4.9 in) in length and weighs 13–18 g (0.46–0.63 oz).

Plumage varies widely across the family, with forest species ranging from black and white species to extremely colourful species to drabber species. Drabness is the rule for scrub or savanna species, particularly those in Africa. Many of the laughingthrushes in the genus Trochalopteron, Garrulax, and Ianthocincla are known for bright markings on their plumage which are counterintuitively difficult to see in the dark overgrown habitats they frequent unless at close range. Mimicry has been observed in the family, with lesser necklaced laughingthrushes mimicking the plumage of the greater necklaced laughingthrush, which is in a different genus, in order to allow them to forage closely together.

The laughingthrushes and allies, like other babbler families, do not generally exhibit much sexual dimorphism beyond males sometimes averaging slightly larger than females in some species. A few genera do exhibit differences in plumage between the sexes, such as Leiothrix, Minla and Cutia. However, some of the differences are subtle. For example, a study examining the reflectance spectrometry of two laughingthrush species with no apparent differences in plumage between the sexes, Elliot's laughingthrush and plain laughingthrush, found that in both species the males had brighter plumage and the females, possibly due to sexual selection or to make the female less conspicuous to predators or brood parasites.

== Behaviour ==
=== Diet and feeding ===
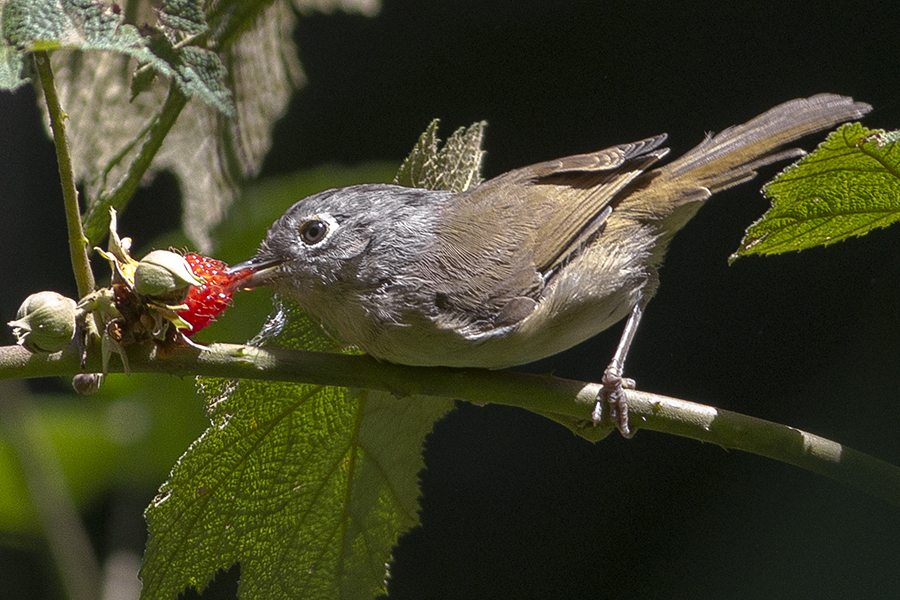
Berries form an important part of the diet of Nepal fulvettas in the non-breeding season.

The diet of the laughingthrushes and their allies is dominated by invertebrates, mostly insects and other arthropods. Some species take fruit, nectar and seeds, and larger species will take small vertebrates. Among the insectivores there are several guilds that specialise in certain feeding in certain ways. Smaller arboreal species glean insects from leaves, twigs and branches, including Alcippe, Leiothrix, Minla and the crocias in Laniellus. The barwings in Actinodura and the two cutias also glean insects from epiphytes. Other guilds represented by the laughingthrushes include terrestrial hunters, like Ianthocincla and Trochalopteron, which hunt on the ground and in the undergrowth, and generalists that take prey via gleaning from leaves and branches and the ground.

The laughingthrushes and allies are highly social species, so it is no surprise that much feeding is undertaken in family groups or small flocks. Many species associate with mixed-species feeding flocks. Members of the family can even act as the nucleus species for such flocks, such as the Nepal fulvetta. These associations are not without cost; greater racket-tailed drongos that participate in flocks with greater and lesser necklaced laughingthrushes in Myanmar will pursue or attack the laughingthrushes in order to steal prey items they have located. In spite of this the laughingthrushes still participate in the feeding-flocks, presumably because they receive a benefit from the drongo also acting as a sentinel for the flock, alerting them to predators. Accepting kleptoparasitism as a trade-off for security applies outside of the large feeding-flocks as well. Fork-tailed drongos in Africa will accompany families of southern pied babblers, and make false alarm calls to scare the babblers into fleeing so that the drongo can steal the prey. Smaller families of southern pied babblers will rely on the drongos as sentinels and frequently lose food to false alarms, but in larger families the babblers will take on more of the responsibilities for keeping watch, making the false alarms less effective.

Sentinels watching for predators during feeding are an important part of the lives of social species. Arabian babblers forage in groups of 2 to 22 individuals and while doing so take turns to watch for predators from high vantage points. When studied during the migration season in Israel, during which many non-resident species of bird may be seen, the species was adept at identifying potential threats, although it sometimes overestimated the danger posed by some species. The reaction of the babblers to resident lower threat predators was less marked, showing that they were willing to accept the opportunity cost when dealing with uncertain threats, but once the threat level was known they adjusted their responses accordingly.

=== Calls and songs ===
A feral Chinese hwamei in Japan singing

The laughingthrushes and their allies are, like most of the birds formerly grouped as Old World babblers, highly vocal, so much so that both these common names invoke their calls and songs. Jean Théodore Delacour had grouped Turdoidini, the clade that now contains much of the family, on the basis of their calls, and they were known as the song-babblers. The songs and calls serve a number of functions. Many of the family's genera have been reported to engage in dueting, including Argya , Trochalopteron and Actinodura, and others are suspected to based on accounts of captive birds in aviculture. These duets are assumed to be important in maintaining pair-bonds. While one species of Argya duets, the majority, along with Turdoides babblers, do not as group living is the rule. These species have a wide range of uniform calls with specific meanings. For example, the jungle babbler, a cooperative breeder that lives in small groups, has 15 distinct calls with functions relating to foraging, movement, brooding, aggression and vigilance, with vigilance being the purpose of eight of the fifteen call types. Alarm calls can distinguish between different types of threats, for example Arabian babblers have different calls for predatory mammals and for birds. The family is one of the first groups outside of the primates that has been identified as being able to combine calls with different meanings to create a derived meaning, which is of interest to scientists examining the early evolution of language. The southern pied babbler has been observed combing a recruitment call, which is used to muster others in the group to their location when the group is moving during foraging, with a warning call used for predators, to bring the group together to mob ground living predators.

== List of genera ==
The family contains 143 species in 17 genera:

- Alcippe – fulvettas (10 species)
- Grammatoptila – striated laughingthrush
- Cutia – cutias (2 species)
- Laniellus – crocias (2 species)
- Trochalopteron – laughingthrushes (19 species)
- Actinodura – barwings and minlas (9 species)
- Montecincla – laughingthrushes (4 species)
- Minla – red-tailed minla
- Leioptila – rufous-backed sibia
- Leiothrix – (2 species)
- Liocichla – liocichlas (5 species)
- Heterophasia – sibias (7 species)
- Argya – mainly babblers (16 species); previous placed in Turdoides
- Turdoides – babblers (19 species)
- Garrulax – laughingthrushes (14 species)
- Ianthocincla – laughingthrushes (8 species); previously placed in Garrulax
- Pterorhinus – laughingthrushes and babaxes (23 species); previously placed in Garrulax
