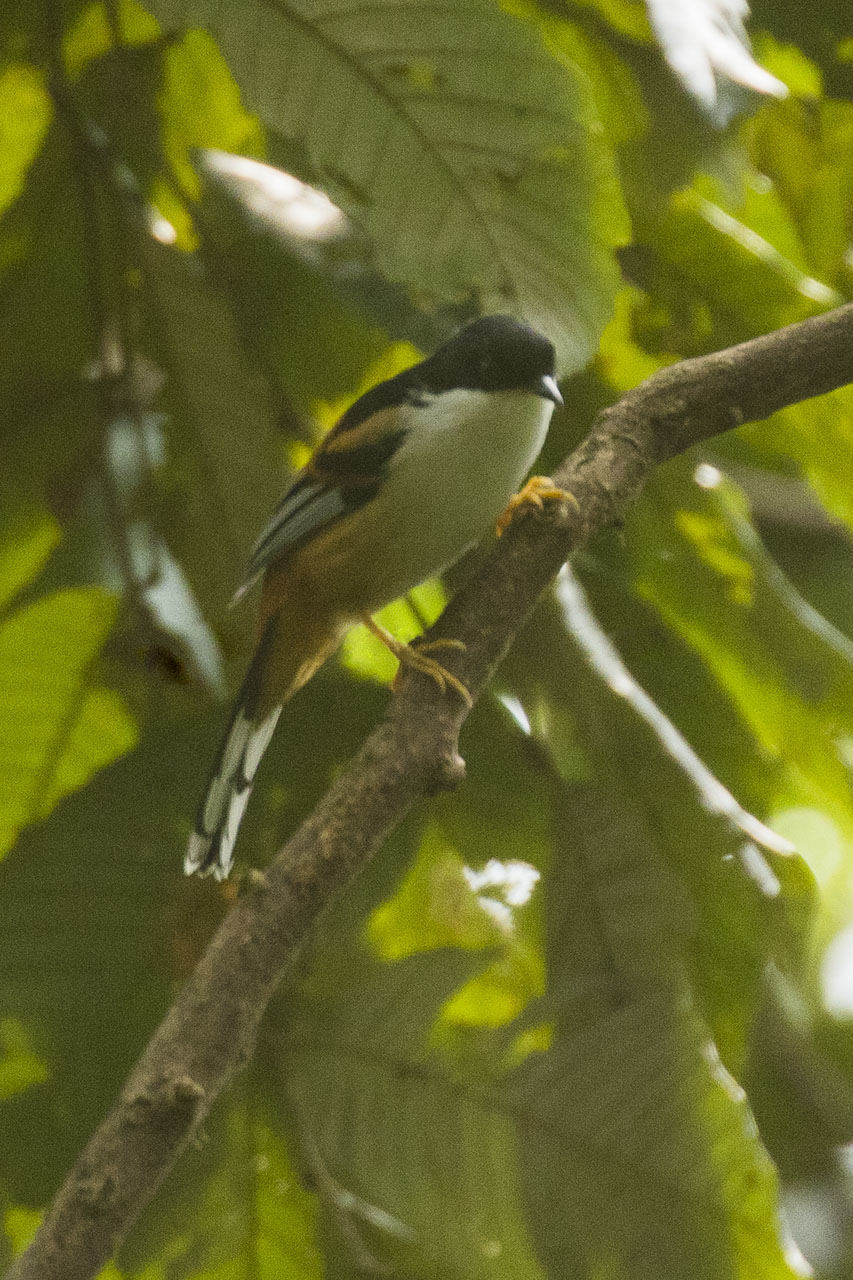

Conservation status
- Least Concern (IUCN 3.1)

Scientific classification
- Kingdom: Animalia
- Phylum: Chordata
- Class: Aves
- Order: Passeriformes
- Family: Leiothrichidae
- Genus: Leioptila; Blyth, 1847
- Species: L. annectens

Binomial name
- Leioptila annectens Blyth, 1847

Synonyms
- Heterophasia annectans

= Rufous-backed sibia =

Species of bird

The rufous-backed sibia (Leioptila annectens) is a passerine bird in the family Leiothrichidae.

It was formerly placed in the genus Heterophasia but is now the only species in the genus Leioptila.

It is found from the Himalayas to south-central Vietnam. Its natural habitats are subtropical or tropical moist lowland forests and subtropical or tropical moist montane forests.
