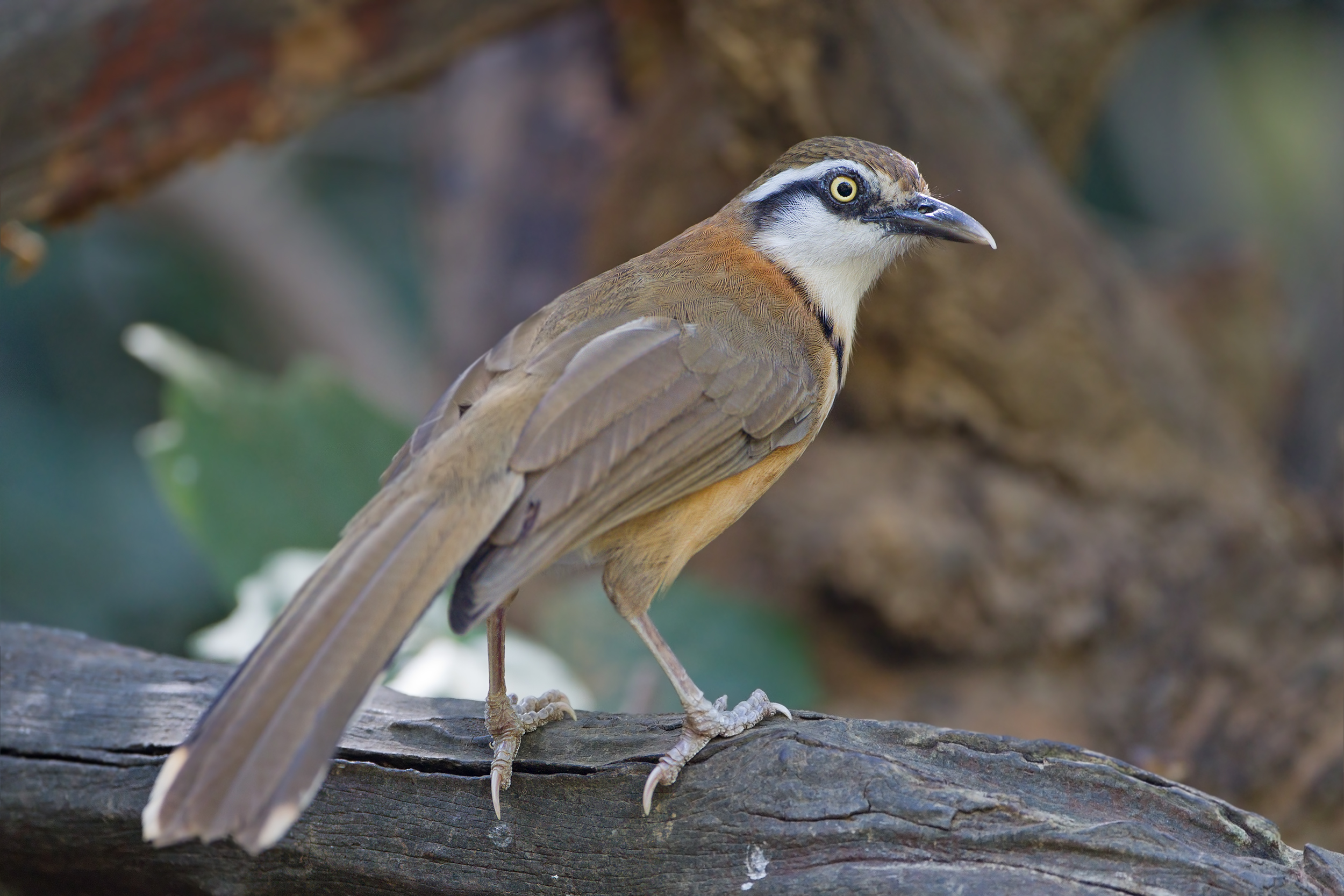

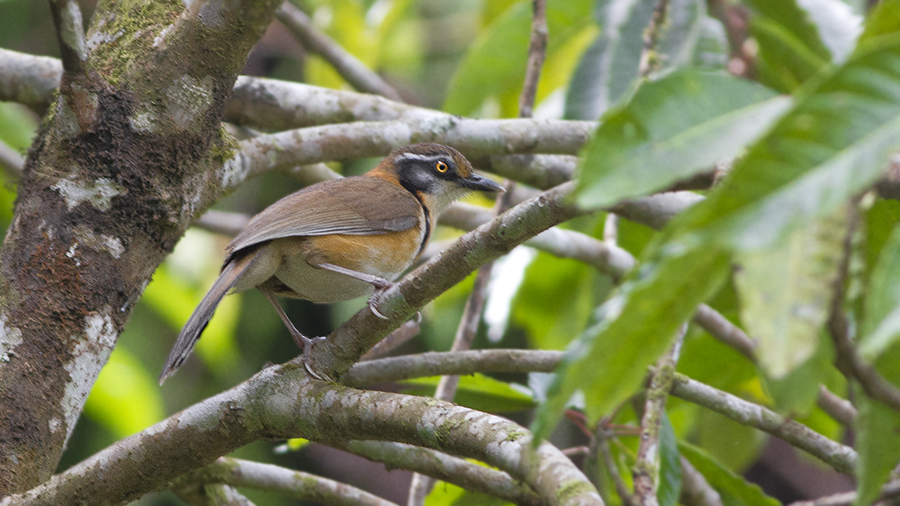
- Garrulax monileger monileger from Pangolakha Wildlife Sanctuary, East Sikkim, India.

Conservation status
- Least Concern (IUCN 3.1)

Scientific classification
- Kingdom: Animalia
- Phylum: Chordata
- Class: Aves
- Order: Passeriformes
- Family: Leiothrichidae
- Genus: Garrulax
- Species: G. monileger

Binomial name
- Garrulax monileger (Hodgson, 1836)

= Lesser necklaced laughingthrush =

Species of bird

The lesser necklaced laughingthrush (Garrulax monileger) is a species of bird in the family Leiothrichidae.

== Distribution ==
Its range extends across the eastern Himalayas, southern China and Indochina.

Its natural habitats are subtropical or tropical moist lowland forest and subtropical or tropical moist montane forest.

== Behavior and Ecology ==
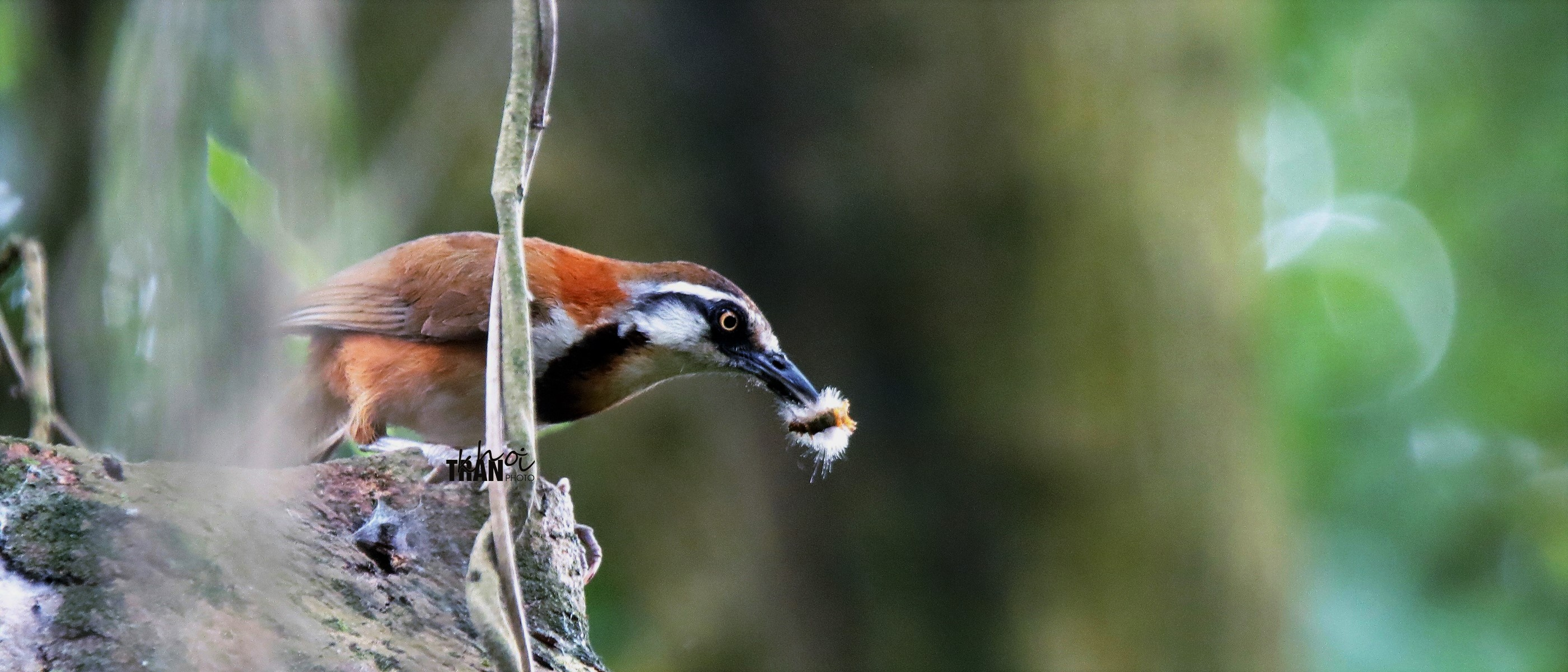

Lesser necklaced laughingthrushes may be mimics of Greater necklaced laughingthrushes, the latter of which are dominant in mixed-species flocks.
