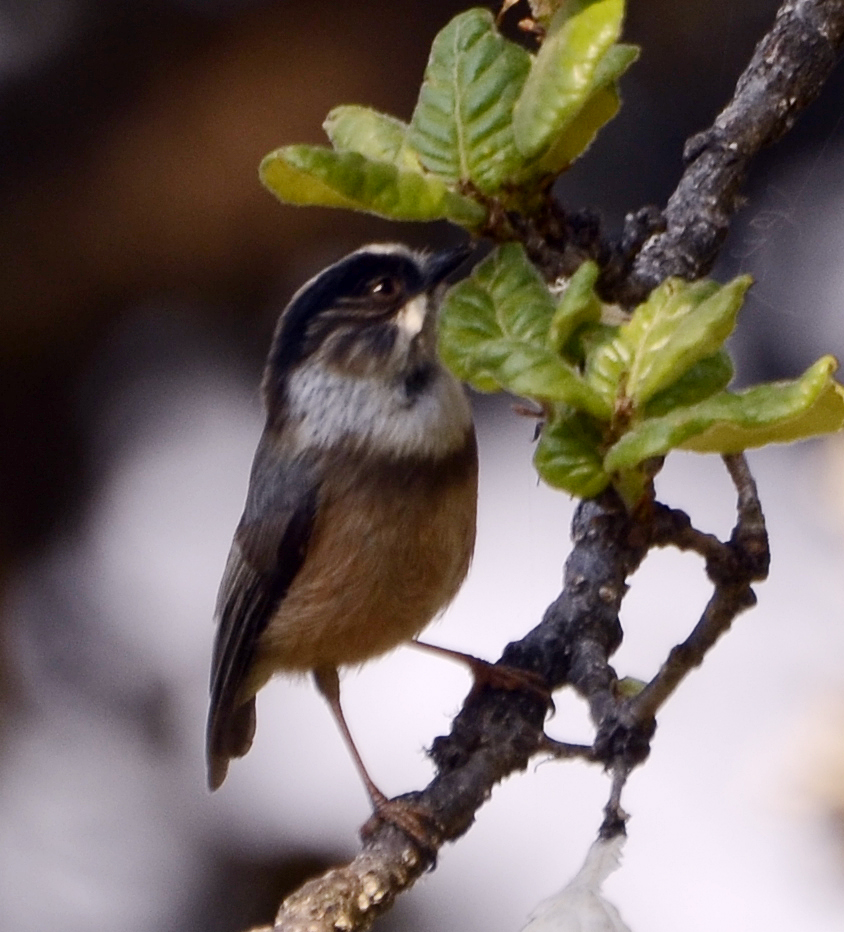
- White-throated bushtit in Kedarnath Wildlife Sanctuary.

Conservation status
- Least Concern (IUCN 3.1)

Scientific classification
- Kingdom: Animalia
- Phylum: Chordata
- Class: Aves
- Order: Passeriformes
- Family: Aegithalidae
- Genus: Aegithalos
- Species: A. niveogularis

Binomial name
- Aegithalos niveogularis (Gould, 1855)
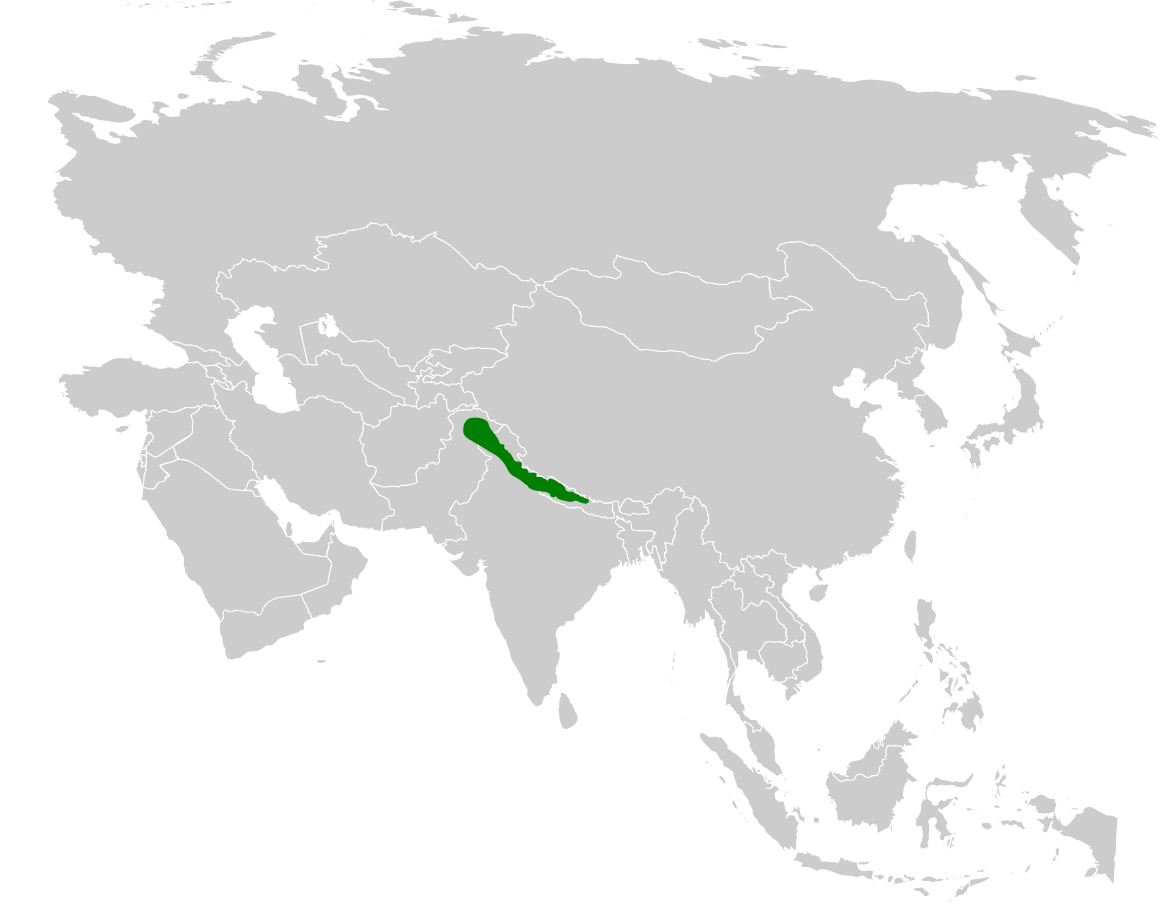

= White-throated bushtit =

Species of bird

The white-throated bushtit (Aegithalos niveogularis), also known as the white-throated tit, is a species of bird in the family Aegithalidae. It is found in India, Nepal, and Pakistan. Its natural habitat is subtropical or tropical moist montane forests.
