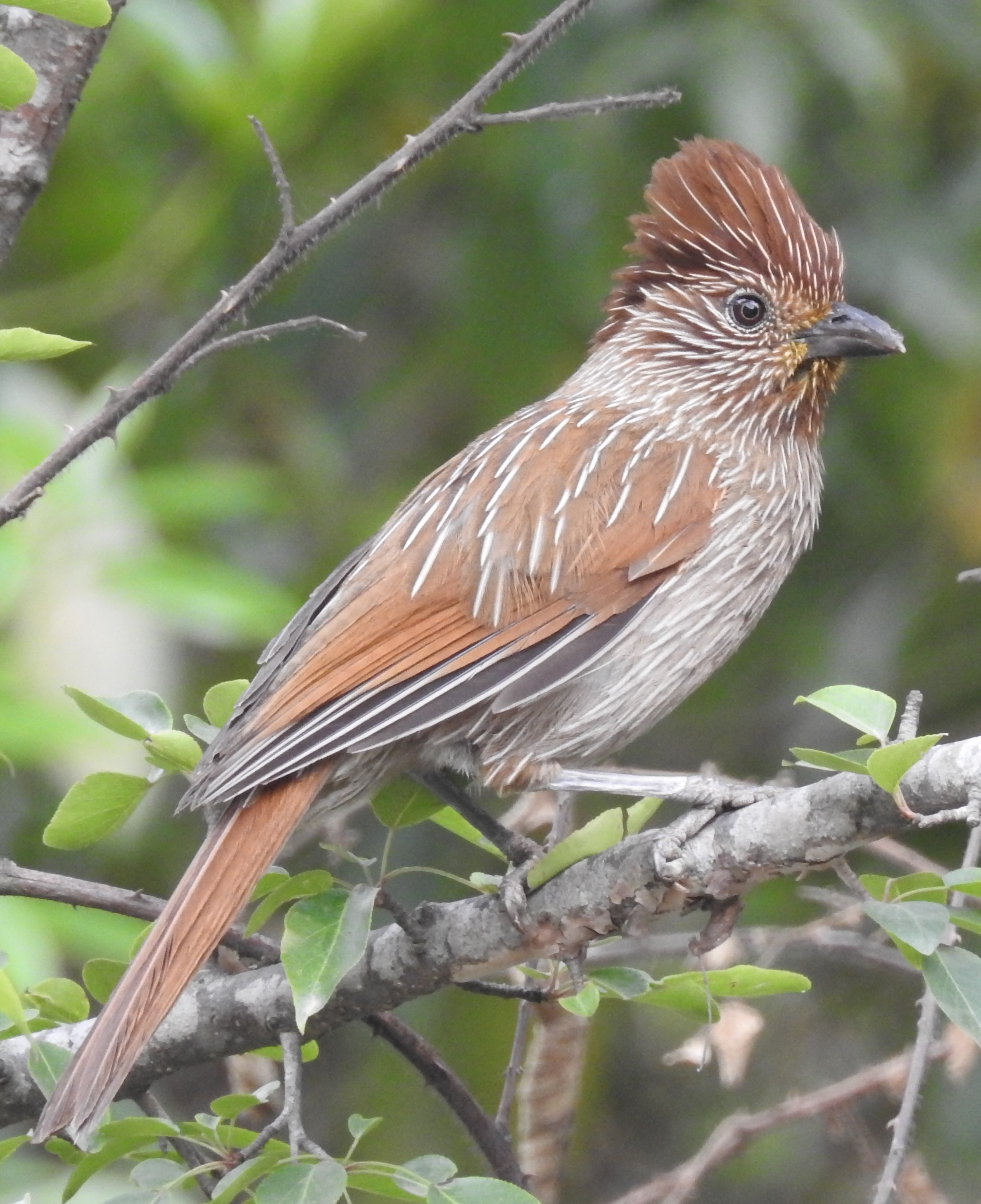
- in Nainital district, Uttarakhand, India

Conservation status
- Least Concern (IUCN 3.1)

Scientific classification
- Kingdom: Animalia
- Phylum: Chordata
- Class: Aves
- Order: Passeriformes
- Family: Leiothrichidae
- Genus: Grammatoptila; Reichenbach, 1850
- Species: G. striata

Binomial name
- Grammatoptila striata (Vigors, 1831)

= Striated laughingthrush =

Species of bird

The striated laughingthrush (Grammatoptila striata) is a passerine bird in the family Leiothrichidae. It was at one time placed in the genus Garrulax but following the publication of a comprehensive molecular phylogenetic study in 2018, it was moved to be the only species in the resurrected genus Grammatoptila.

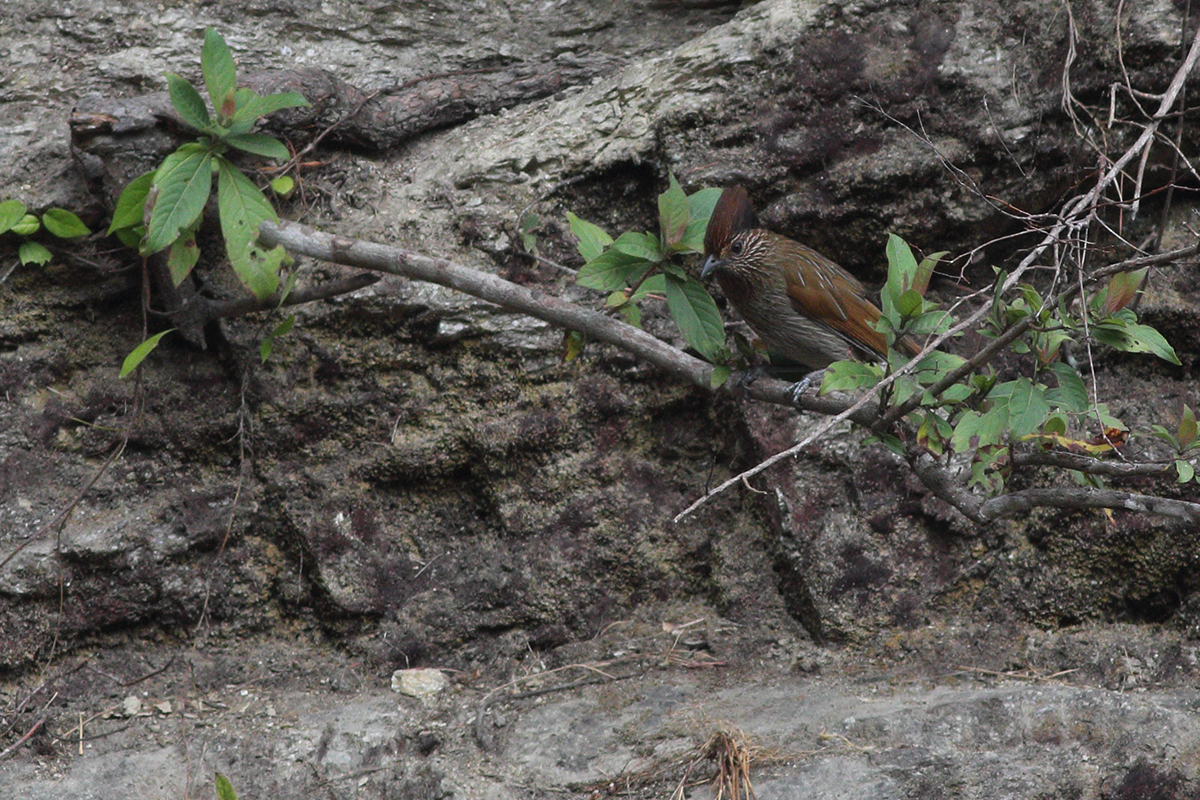
subspecies Grammatoptila striata cranbrooki from Eaglenest Wildlife Sanctuary, Arunachal Pradesh, India.

It is found in the northern temperate regions of the Indian subcontinent and ranges across Bhutan, India, Myanmar, Tibet and Nepal. Its natural habitats are subtropical or tropical moist lowland forests and subtropical or tropical moist montane forests.
