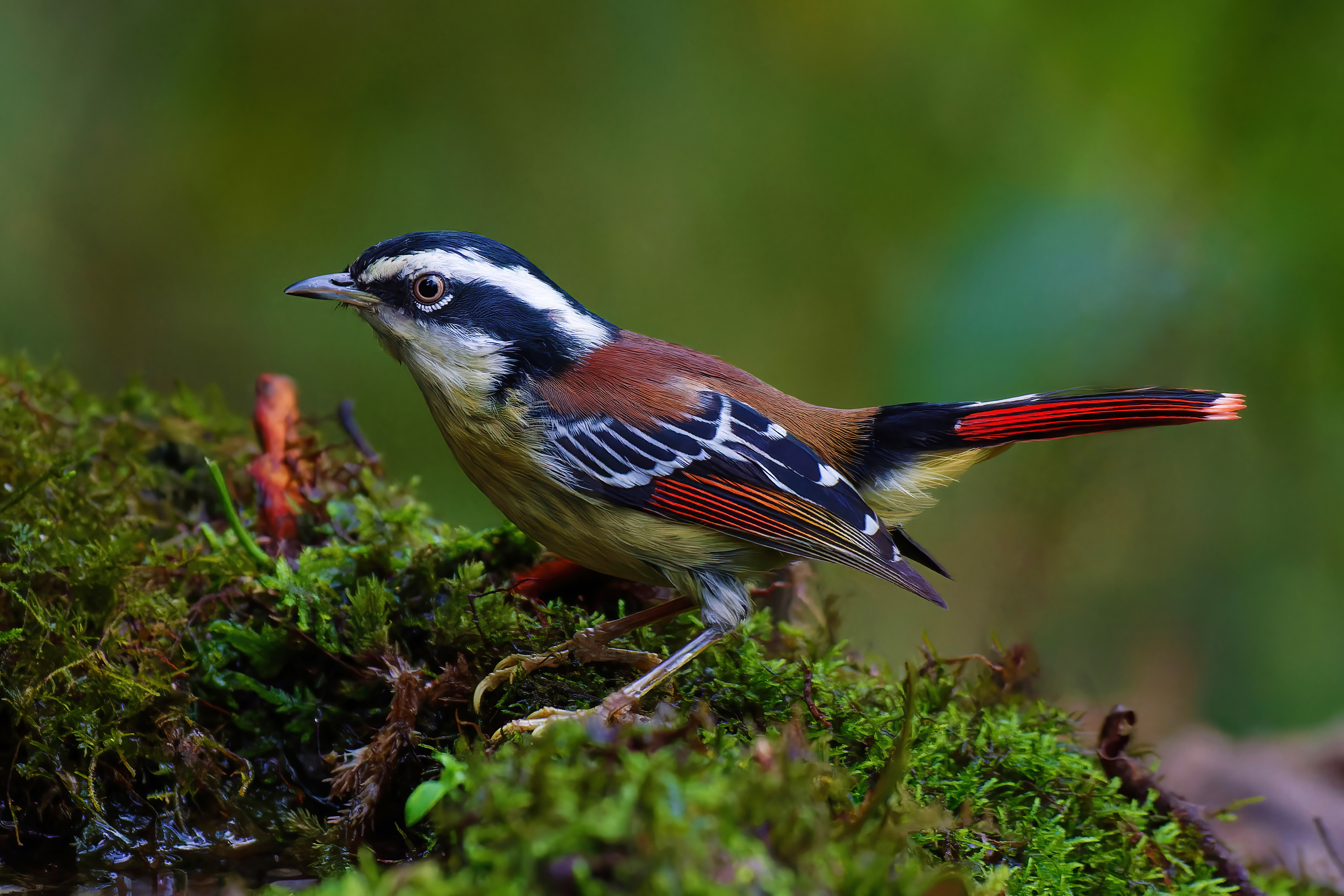
- Red-tailed minla in West Bengal, India

Conservation status
- Least Concern (IUCN 3.1)

Scientific classification
- Kingdom: Animalia
- Phylum: Chordata
- Class: Aves
- Order: Passeriformes
- Family: Leiothrichidae
- Genus: Minla; Hodgson, 1837
- Species: M. ignotincta

Binomial name
- Minla ignotincta Hodgson, 1837

= Red-tailed minla =

Species of bird

The red-tailed minla (Minla ignotincta) is a passerine bird in the family Leiothrichidae. It is the only species in the genus Minla.

It is found in the Indian subcontinent and Southeast Asia. Its range includes Bangladesh, Bhutan, India, Laos, Myanmar, Nepal, Thailand and Vietnam. Its natural habitat is subtropical or tropical moist montane forests.
