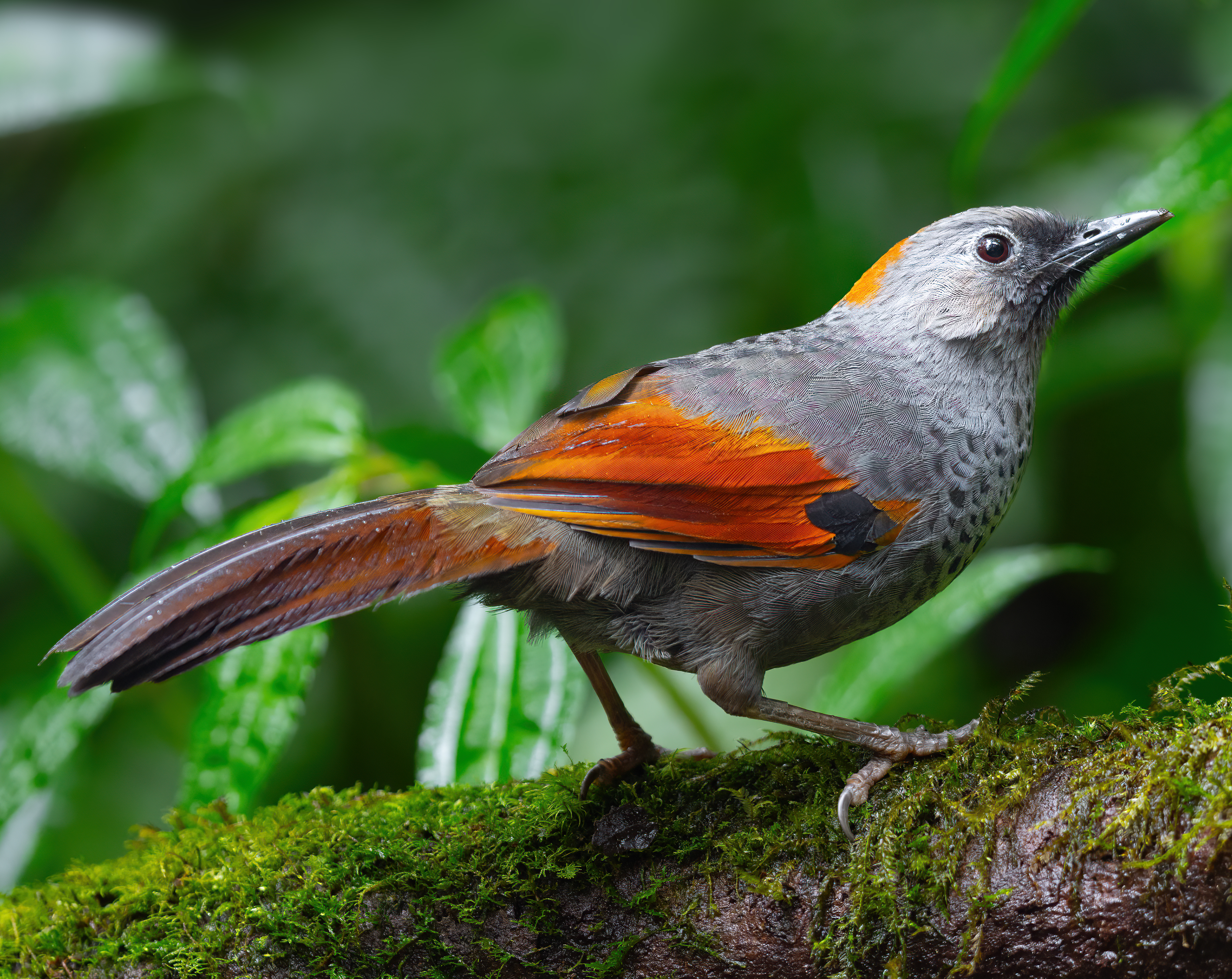

Conservation status
- Endangered (IUCN 3.1)

Scientific classification
- Kingdom: Animalia
- Phylum: Chordata
- Class: Aves
- Order: Passeriformes
- Family: Leiothrichidae
- Genus: Trochalopteron
- Species: T. ngoclinhense

Binomial name
- Trochalopteron ngoclinhense (Eames, JC, Trai Trong Le & Nguyen Cu, 1999)

Synonyms
- Garrulax ngoclinhensis

= Golden-winged laughingthrush =

Species of bird

The golden-winged laughingthrush (Trochalopteron ngoclinhense) is a species of bird in the laughingthrush family Leiothrichidae. The species is most closely related to the chestnut-crowned laughingthrush and has sometimes been lumped with it. The species is restricted to the southern Annamite Range in western Vietnam and southern Laos. It was discovered in 1996, and remains poorly studied due to its small, remote population and shy nature. It lives in primary montane rainforest. The species is threatened with extinction due to habitat loss caused by deforestation.

== Discovery and taxonomy ==
The golden-winged laughingthrush was first discovered by science in 1996. Conservationists were attempting to identify priority areas of biodiversity in Vietnam as part of an effort to improve the network of protected spaces. The relative isolation of the Mount Ngọc Linh and the lack of scientific study in the area led to a survey being conducted as part of a joint project between BirdLife International and Vietnam's Forest Inventory and Planning Institute (FIPI). The survey soon noted a new species of laughingthrush, intermediate in appearance between the chestnut-crowned laughingthrush and the collared laughingthrush, and one male was collected. Two additional specimens were collected in 1998, and the species was formally described in 1999 as Garrulax ngoclinhensis. The specific name ngoclinhensis is a reference to the mountain it was collected on, which literally translated into English means "sacred precious stone".

The scientists that described the golden-winged laughingthrush identified that the chestnut-crowned laughingthrush was its closest relative, in fact they acknowledged that it was necessary to make the case that it should be considered a separate species from it rather than a subspecies. Differences in plumage between the golden-winged laughingthrush and the 14 then known subspecies of chestnut-crowned laughingthrush, the need to review all the taxa assigned to the chestnut-crowned laughingthrush, and the distance between the two populations (700 km (430 mi)) all were provided as evidence that the two should be treated as separate species. While some later checklists, such as the 2003 Howard and Moore Complete Checklist of the Birds of the World, lumped the two species together, most authorities have retained the golden-winged laughingthrush as its own species. The genus Garrulax was identified as polyphyletic in a study of the genetics of the Old World babblers published in 2003. The genus was broken up, and while the DNA of this species has not been analysed, its closest relatives were moved to the genus Trochalopteron, which is where the species is currently placed.

== Distribution and habitat ==
The golden-winged laughingthrush is endemic to area of the Kontum Massif of the southern Annamite Range in central Vietnam and southern Laos. It was originally only known from two sites in Vietnam, Mt Ngọc Linh and the nearby Mt Ngoc Boc, but it was predicted to also be present in nearby areas with the same habitat, and the species was indeed discovered in the Dong Ampham National Biodiversity Conservation Area in southern Laos in 2022.

Its natural habitat is primary tropical moist evergreen montane forest, from 1,500–2,200 m (4,900–7,200 ft), where it lives in bamboo stands and the undergrowth.

== Description ==
The golden-winged laughingthrush is a medium-sized songbird, 27 cm (11 in) in length. The plumage is predominately grey with scaling on the breast. The forehead is light grey and the crown is chestnut coloured, and the face is dark grey. On the wings the greater coverts are chestnut, primary coverts are black, and the flight feathers are golden yellow. These brightly coloured wings are typical of Trochalopteron and are used for signaling by species in the genus. The tail is mostly slaty-grey with the outer feathers being golden-ochre in colour. Both sexes are alike, and juvenile or immature birds have not been described.

== Behaviour ==
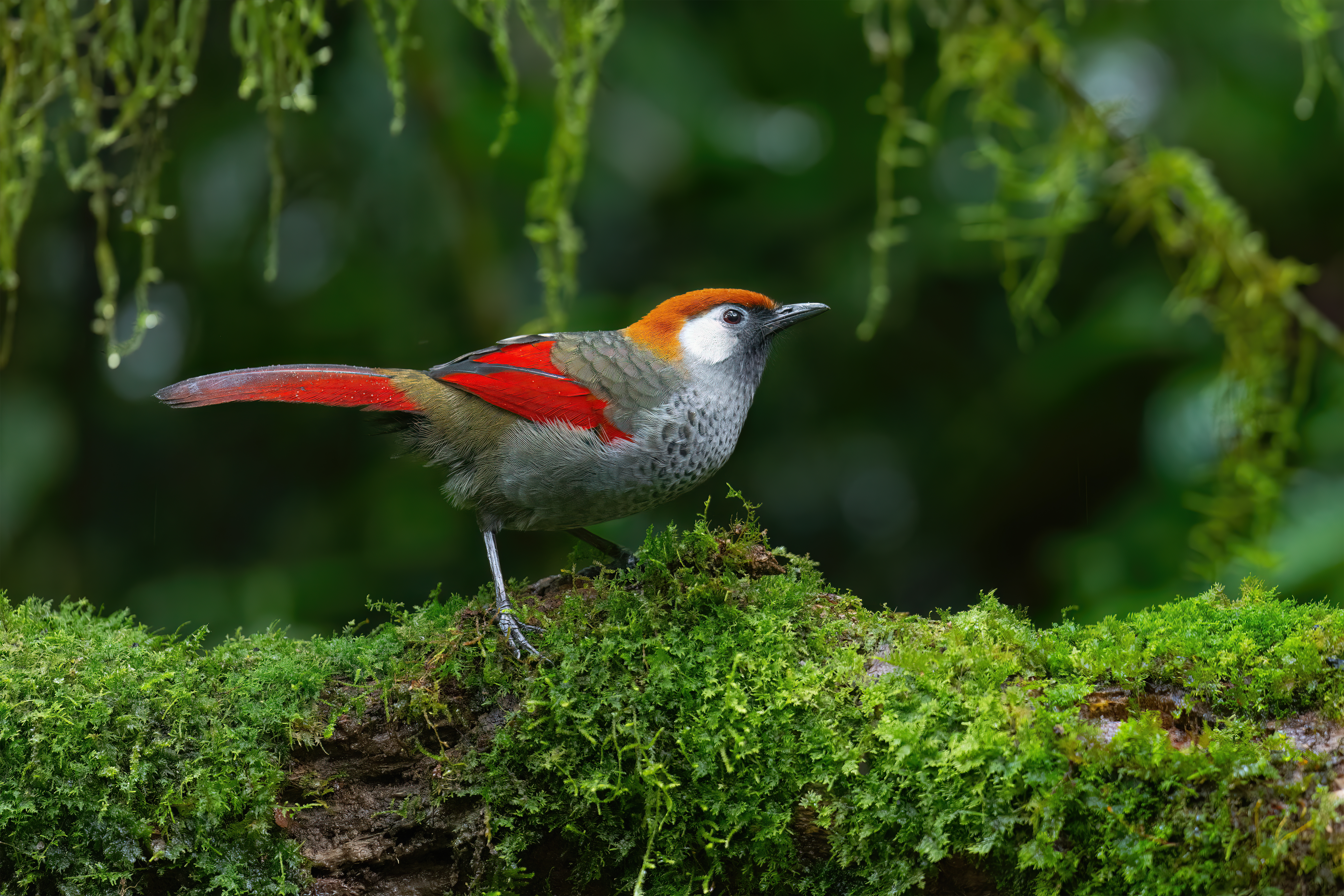
The golden-winged laughingthrush has been seen associating with the related red-tailed laughingthrush

The behaviour of the golden-winged laughingthrush is poorly understood. The species is extremely shy and difficult to observe or study, but will respond to playback of its calls. No information exists about its diet, but it is assumed to feed on invertebrates from the forest floor like other species in the genus. They have been observed foraging with other species of bird including families of red-tailed laughingthrushes and brown-crowned scimitar babblers. Nothing is known about their breeding behaviour, except that a male in breeding condition (enlarged gonads) was collected in May. Their song is unknown, but they do make a repeating descending then ascending rr’raow rr’raow call.

== Status and conservation ==
The golden-winged laughingthrush has a small, restricted range in which it is not common. The areas it inhabits are threatened by habitat loss; around Ngọc Linh deforestation to clear land for agriculture resulted in 13% of the evergreen forest being lost between 1976 and 1995. At Dong Ampham in Laos its habitat is being deforested due to gold mining, and to a lesser extent infrastructure for hydroelectric power, resulting in 11% of the forest cover in the conservation area being lost between 2000 and 2021. Because of the small population and threats to its limited habitat the species was evaluated as being Vulnerable by the IUCN Red List of Threatened Species on its discovery, and was reevaluated as Endangered in 2018. Part of the range of this species is currently protected as part of the Ngoc Linh (Kon Tum) Nature Reserve, with another reserve being proposed for another part of the area. As part of the conservation of this species, scientists have asked birdwatchers to search suitable habitat outside its currently known range to identify new populations.
