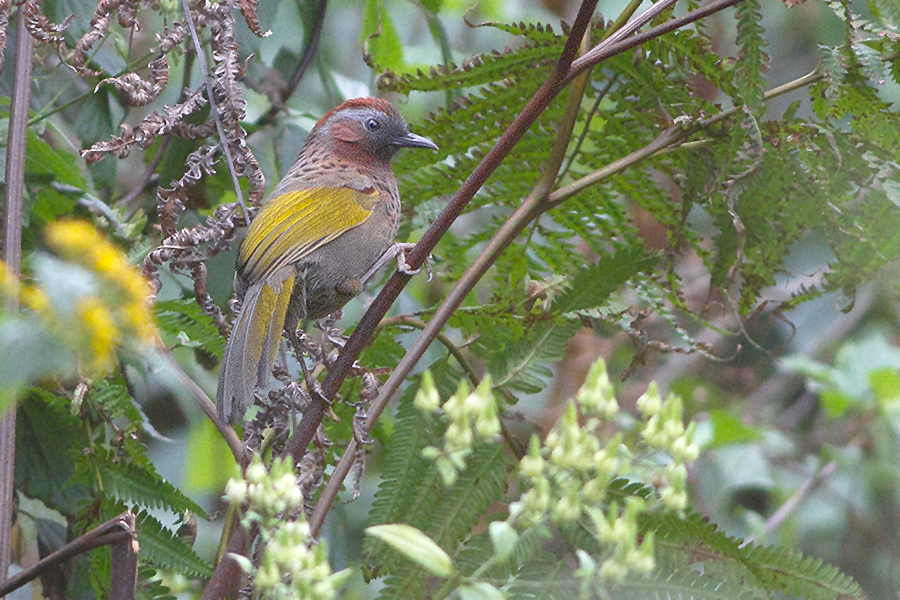
- From Khonoma Nature Conservation and Tragopan Sanctuary, Nagaland, India

Conservation status
- Least Concern (IUCN 3.1)

Scientific classification
- Kingdom: Animalia
- Phylum: Chordata
- Class: Aves
- Order: Passeriformes
- Family: Leiothrichidae
- Genus: Trochalopteron
- Species: T. chrysopterum

Binomial name
- Trochalopteron chrysopterum (Gould, 1835)

Synonyms
- Garrulax erythrocephalus chrysopterus Garrulax chrysopterus

= Assam laughingthrush =

Assam Laughingthrush

Species of bird

The Assam laughingthrush (Trochalopteron chrysopterum) is a species of bird in the family Leiothrichidae. It is found in Northeast India and adjacent southwest China and Myanmar.

The species was formerly regarded as a subspecies of the chestnut-crowned laughingthrush, T. erythrocephalum.
