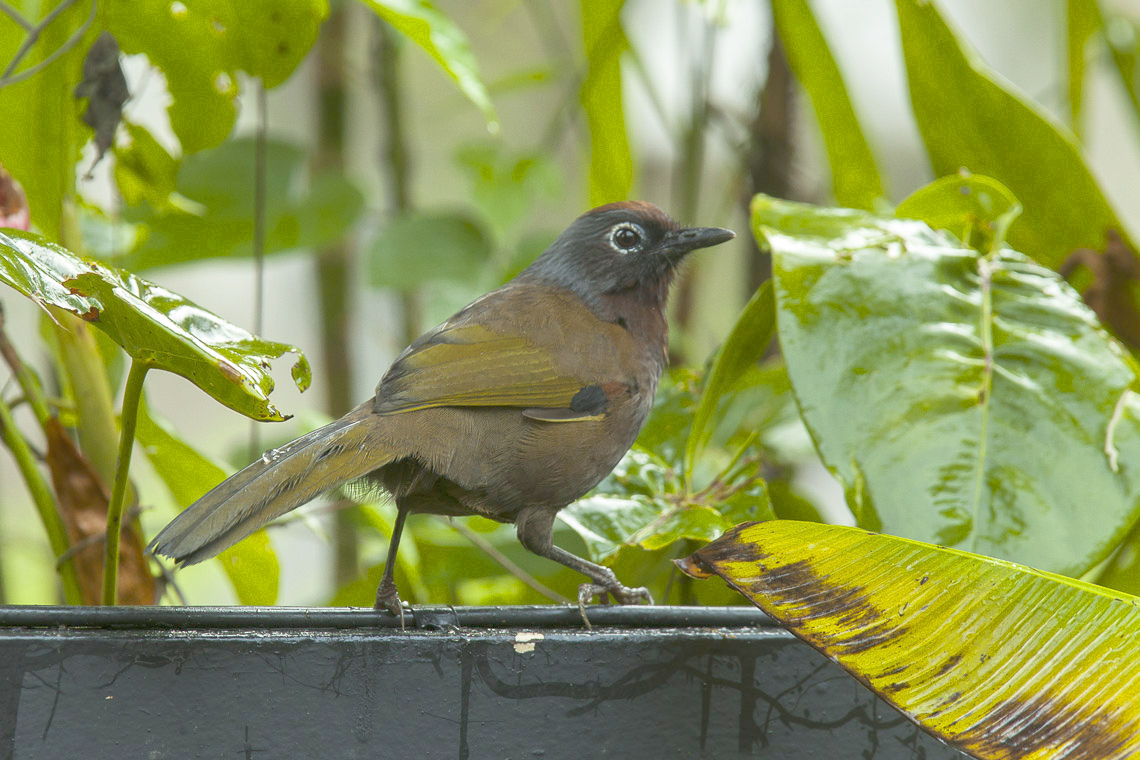

Conservation status
- Least Concern (IUCN 3.1)

Scientific classification
- Kingdom: Animalia
- Phylum: Chordata
- Class: Aves
- Order: Passeriformes
- Family: Leiothrichidae
- Genus: Trochalopteron
- Species: T. peninsulae

Binomial name
- Trochalopteron peninsulae Sharpe, 1887

Synonyms
- Garrulax peninsulae

= Malayan laughingthrush =

Species of bird

The Malayan laughingthrush (Trochalopteron peninsulae) is a species of laughingthrush that was for some time included as a subspecies of the Trochalopteron erythrocephalum. This species is found in the extreme south of Thailand and in peninsular Malaysia.
