= Khonoma Nature Conservation and Tragopan Sanctuary =

Indian conservation reserve

- KNCTS
- Location within Nagaland
- Location: Kohima District, Nagaland
- Nearest city: Kohima
- Coordinates: 25°37′36″N 94°00′08″E
- Area: 25 square km
- Governing body: Government of India, Government of Nagaland

Khonoma Nature Conservation and Tragopan Sanctuary or KNCTS is a conservation reserve and a protected area in the Kohima district, Nagaland, India. The total area notified under this park is around 25 square kilometres (9.7 sq mi); some of villages and hamlets are adjacent to this park: Khonoma, Mezoma and Dzüleke. The sanctuary is home to several endangered mammal species, including the clouded leopard, Asiatic black bear, and hoolock gibbon, as well as over 300 avian species.

== History ==
The sanctuary was created in 1998, when alarmed after 300 endangered Blyth's tragopans (Tragopan blythii) were killed by the villagers in one week as part of a hunting competition. The Khonoma village council demarcated an area of 20 sq. km. within which hunting was banned. This council resolution led to the creation of Khonoma Nature Conservation and Tragopan Sanctuary. Later, the hunting ban was extended to the surrounding community-managed forests of over 123 sq. km.

== Geography ==
This park lies at the extension of Barail Range; the mountain range complex of north-east India and the undisturbed primary virgin forest is a place for some of the range restricted avian fauna. KNCTS is an Important Bird Area; under criteria A1 (threatened species) and A2 (range restricted species) with area code IN423, as identified by BirdLife International.

== Natural history ==
=== Ecoregions ===
The sanctuary includes portions of three ecoregions:

- Himalayan subtropical broadleaf forests
- Northeast India-Myanmar pine forests
- Chin Hills-Arakan Yoma montane forests

=== Fauna ===
Birds some of the exotic species from North-east India are present in this wildlife sanctuary; like Blyth's tragopan, Mountain bamboo partridge, Crested Finchbill, Assam laughingthrush, Striped laughingthrush, Spot-breasted scimitar babbler, Flavescent Bulbul, Naga wren-babbler, to name a few.

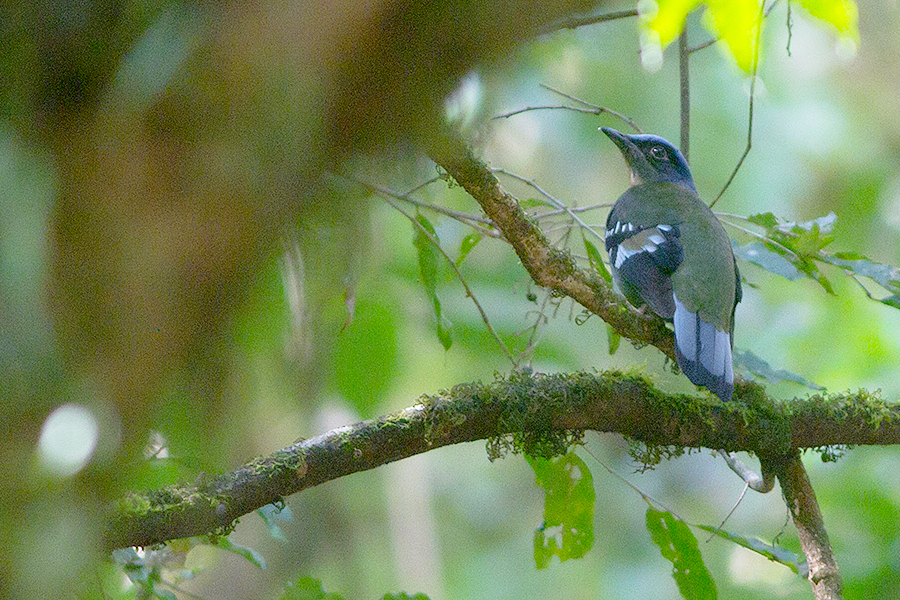
Green cochoa (Cochoa viridis)

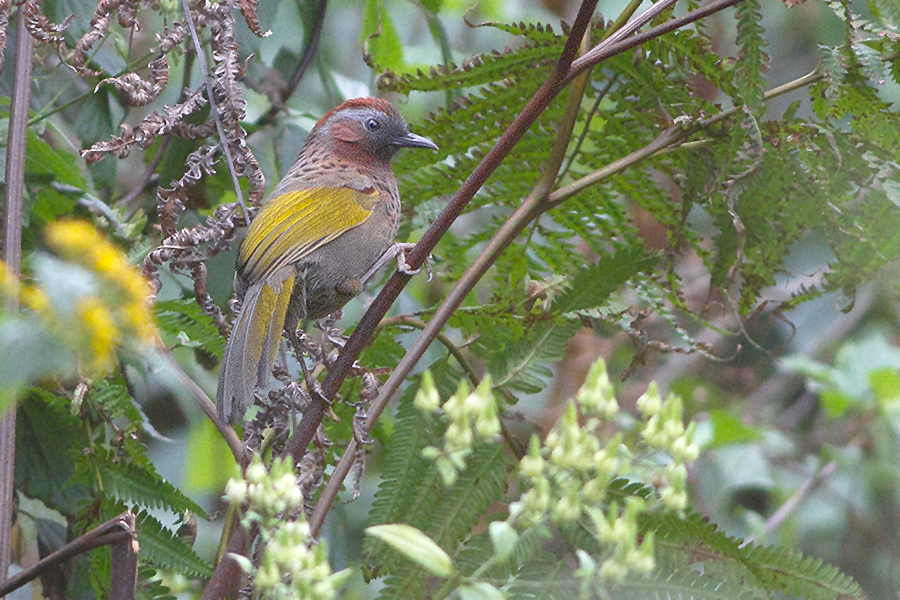
Assam laughingthrush (Trochalopteron chrysopterum)

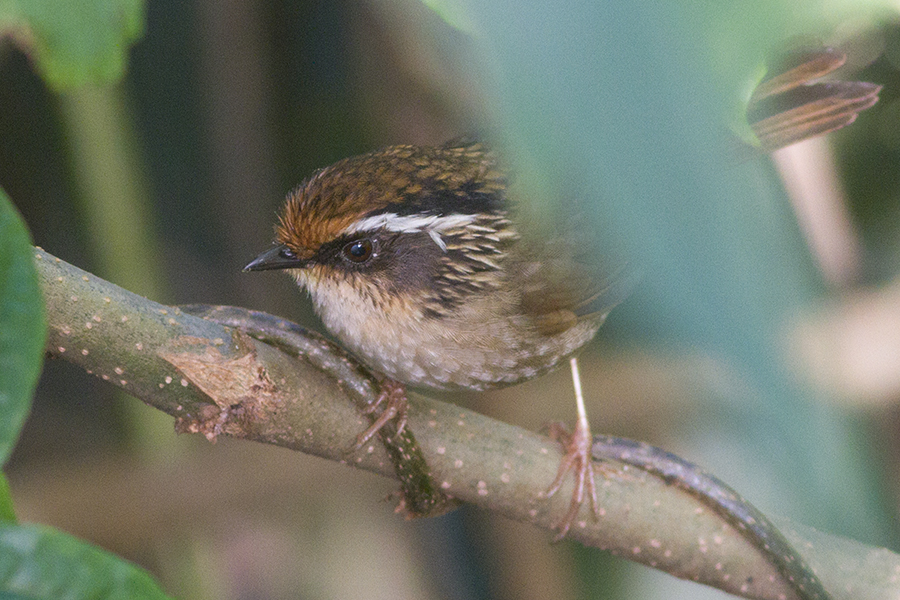
Rusty-capped fulvetta (Alcippe dubia)

Mammals like Binturong, Serow, Jungle cat, Barking Deer, Gayal, Pallas's squirrel, Himalayan striped squirrel, clouded leopard, Asiatic black bear, and hoolock gibbon can be seen in this park.

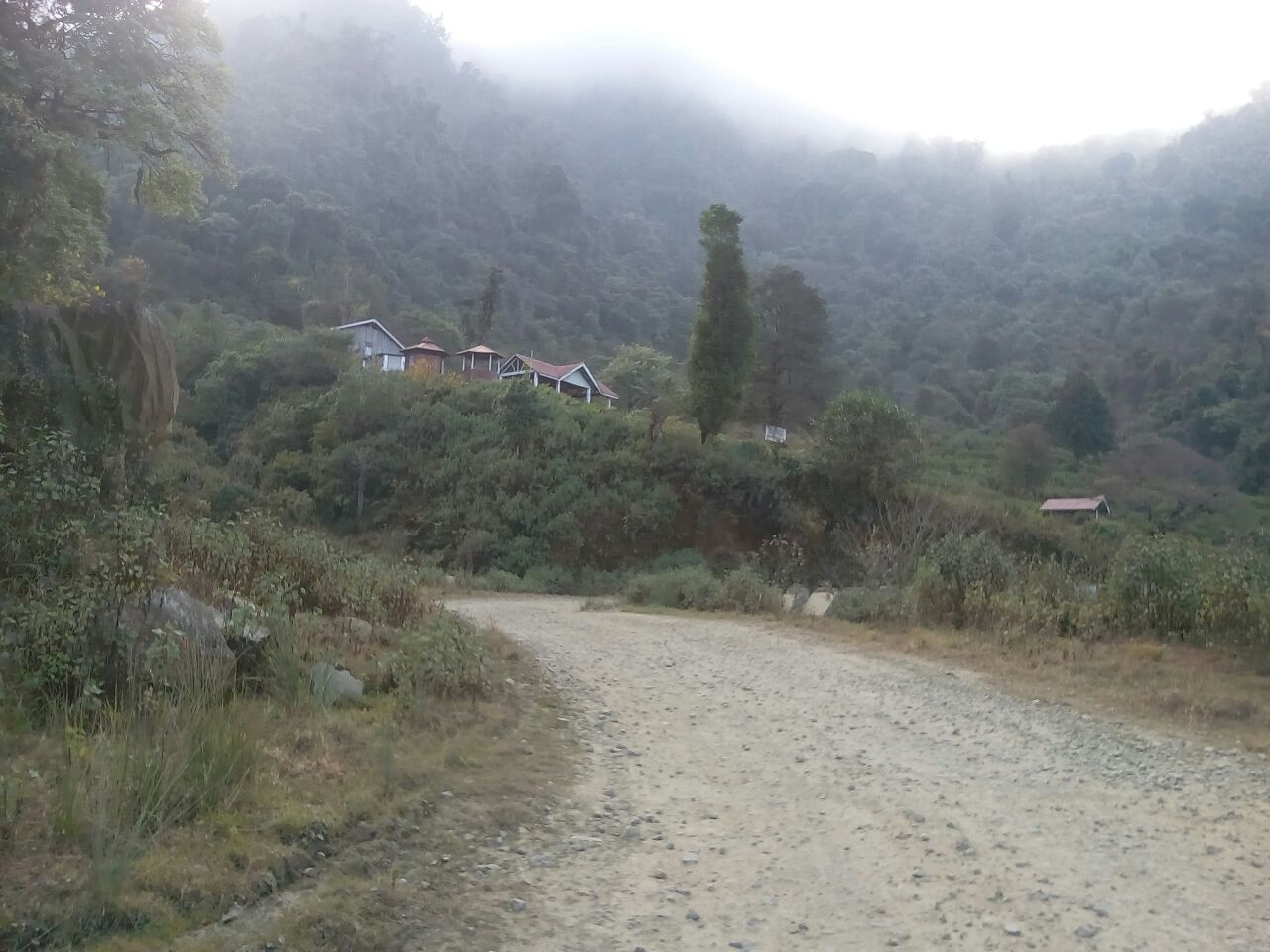
Entrance to KNCTS; log huts and rest rooms; in the background showing pristine primary forest.

Though deforestation and poaching was a major threat for nature and wildlife in Nagaland; however Khonoma may be considered one of the safest place for wild birds and mammals. Community conservation played a major role in protecting the biodiversity of the area.

== Tourism ==
KNCTS is about 18 kilometres (11 mi) west of the capital of Nagaland, Kohima.

In 2019, the village received more than 4,000 visitors. Nearly a fifth of them were overseas tourists drawn to Khonoma’s rich biodiversity and conservation success.
