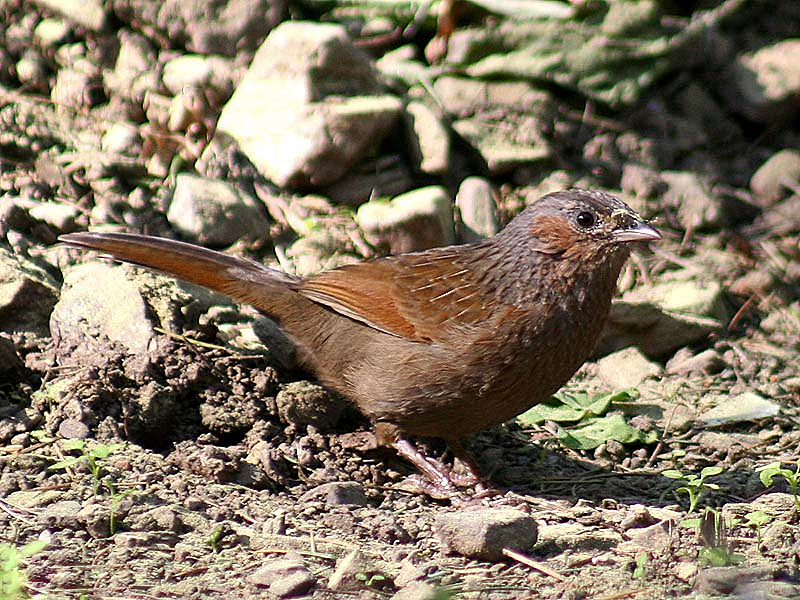
- Streaked laughingthrush (Trochalopteron lineatum)

Scientific classification
- Kingdom: Animalia
- Phylum: Chordata
- Class: Aves
- Order: Passeriformes
- Family: Leiothrichidae
- Genus: Trochalopteron; Blyth, 1843

Type species
- Trochalopteron subunicolor (scaly laughingthrush) Blyth, 1843

Species
- See text

= Trochalopteron =

Genus of birds

Trochalopteron is a genus of passerine birds in the laughingthrush family Leiothrichidae.

== Taxonomy ==
The genus Trochalopteron was introduced in 1843 by the English zoologist Edward Blyth. The name combines the Ancient Greek trokhalos meaning "round" or "bowed" with pteron meaning "wing". The type species was designated in 1930 by E. C. Stuart Baker as the scaly laughingthrush.

=== Species ===
The genus contains the following 19 species:

Image	Common name	Scientific name	Distribution
	Brown-capped laughingthrush	Trochalopteron austeni	Patkai range, India
	Scaly laughingthrush	Trochalopteron subunicolor	Bhutan, China, India, Myanmar, Nepal, and Vietnam.
	Streaked laughingthrush	Trochalopteron lineatum	Turkestan Range to the Safed Koh and east through the Himalayas towards Sikkim.
	Striped laughingthrush	Trochalopteron virgatum	Patkai range, India
	Blue-winged laughingthrush	Trochalopteron squamatum	Eastern Himalaya, Yunnan, Myanmar and Laos
	Variegated laughingthrush	Trochalopteron variegatum	Bhutan, India, Nepal and Tibet.
	Black-faced laughingthrush	Trochalopteron affine	eastern Nepal eastwards to Arunachal Pradesh in India and further to Myanmar, along with Bhutan and southeastern Tibet.
	Elliot's laughingthrush	Trochalopteron elliotii	central China and far northeastern India.
	Brown-cheeked laughingthrush	Trochalopteron henrici	southwestern China and northeastern India
	White-whiskered laughingthrush	Trochalopteron morrisonianum	Taiwan.
	Chestnut-crowned laughingthrush	Trochalopteron erythrocephalum	Bhutan, China, India, and Nepal.
	Collared laughingthrush	Trochalopteron yersini	Vietnam.
	Red-tailed laughingthrush	Trochalopteron milnei	China, Laos, Myanmar, Thailand, and Vietnam.
	Red-winged laughingthrush	Trochalopteron formosum	China (Sichuan, Yunnan and Guangxi provinces) and north-west Vietnam.
	Bhutan laughingthrush	Trochalopteron imbricatum	Bhutan and some adjoining areas in India.
	Assam laughingthrush	Trochalopteron chrysopterum	Northeast India and adjacent southwest China and Myanmar.
	Silver-eared laughingthrush	Trochalopteron melanostigma	southern Yunnan, Laos, Myanmar, Thailand and Vietnam.
	Golden-winged laughingthrush	Trochalopteron ngoclinhense	Vietnam.
	Malayan laughingthrush	Trochalopteron peninsulae	southern Thailand and peninsular Malaysia.

=== Former species ===
Two species that were formerly included in this genus have been moved to Montecincla based on phylogenetic studies that showed them to be more distantly related to the Trochalopteron clade than to a clade formed by species in the genera Leiothrix, Actinodura, Minla, Crocias and Heterophasia.

- Black-chinned laughingthrush, Montecincla cachinnans (with jerdoni separated as a full species)
- Kerala laughingthrush, Montecincla fairbanki
