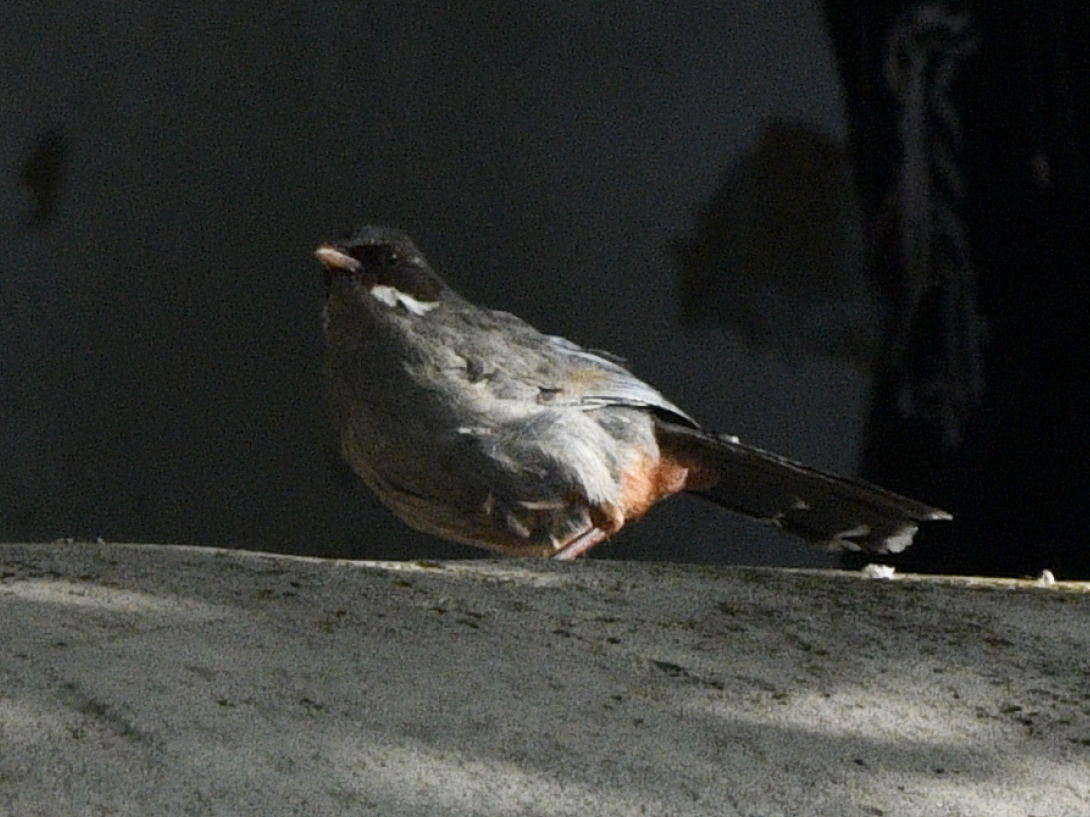

Conservation status
- Least Concern (IUCN 3.1)

Scientific classification
- Kingdom: Animalia
- Phylum: Chordata
- Class: Aves
- Order: Passeriformes
- Family: Leiothrichidae
- Genus: Trochalopteron
- Species: T. henrici

Binomial name
- Trochalopteron henrici Oustalet, 1892

Synonyms
- Garrulax henrici (Oustalet, 1892)

= Brown-cheeked laughingthrush =

Species of bird

The brown-cheeked laughingthrush (Trochalopteron henrici) is a species of bird in the family Leiothrichidae. It is found in south-western China and north-eastern India.

The specific name of this bird commemorates Prince Henri of Orléans.
