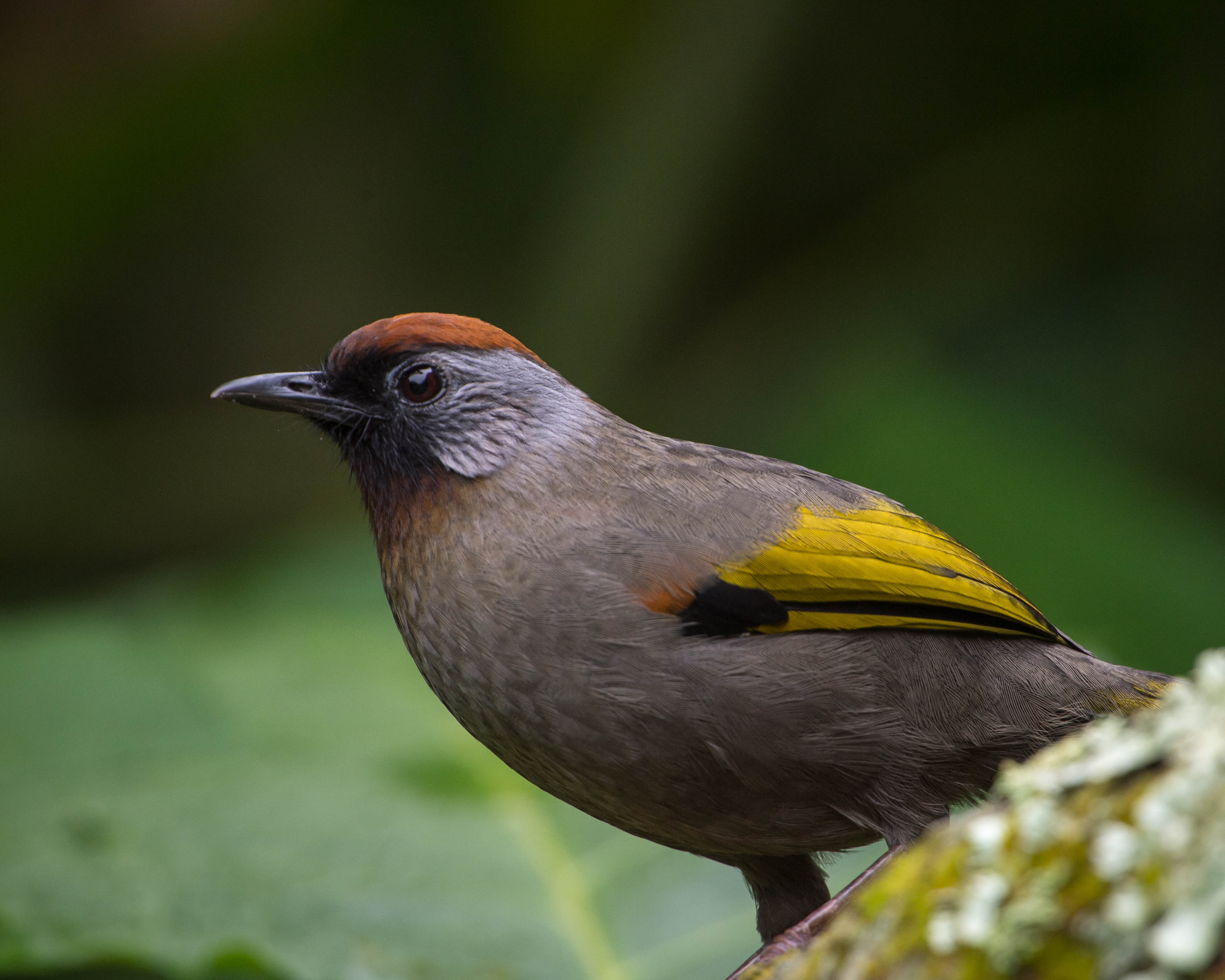
- Doi Inthanon, Chiang Mai, Thailand

Conservation status
- Least Concern (IUCN 3.1)

Scientific classification
- Kingdom: Animalia
- Phylum: Chordata
- Class: Aves
- Order: Passeriformes
- Family: Leiothrichidae
- Genus: Trochalopteron
- Species: T. melanostigma

Binomial name
- Trochalopteron melanostigma (Blyth, 1855)

Synonyms
- Garrulax erythrocephalus melanostigma; Garrulax melanostigma

= Silver-eared laughingthrush =

Species of bird

The silver-eared laughingthrush (Trochalopteron melanostigma) is a species of bird in the family Leiothrichidae. It is found in southern Yunnan, Laos, Myanmar, Thailand and Vietnam. It was formerly considered a subspecies of the chestnut-crowned laughingthrush, G. erythrocephalus.
