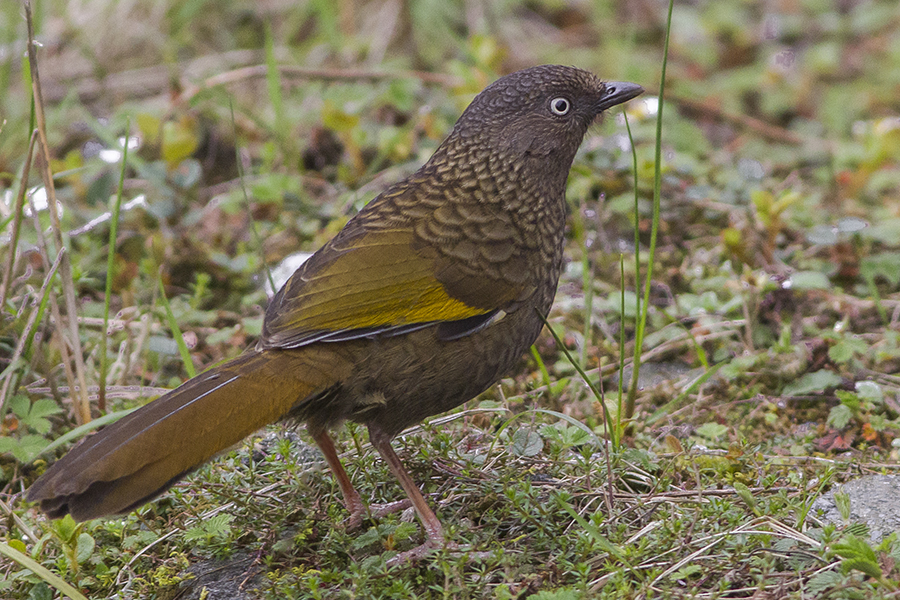
- from Pangolakha WLS, Sikkim, India.

Conservation status
- Least Concern (IUCN 3.1)

Scientific classification
- Kingdom: Animalia
- Phylum: Chordata
- Class: Aves
- Order: Passeriformes
- Family: Leiothrichidae
- Genus: Trochalopteron
- Species: T. subunicolor

Binomial name
- Trochalopteron subunicolor Blyth, 1843

Synonyms
- Garrulax subunicolor

= Scaly laughingthrush =

Species of bird

The scaly laughingthrush (Trochalopteron subunicolor) is a bird species in the family Leiothrichidae.

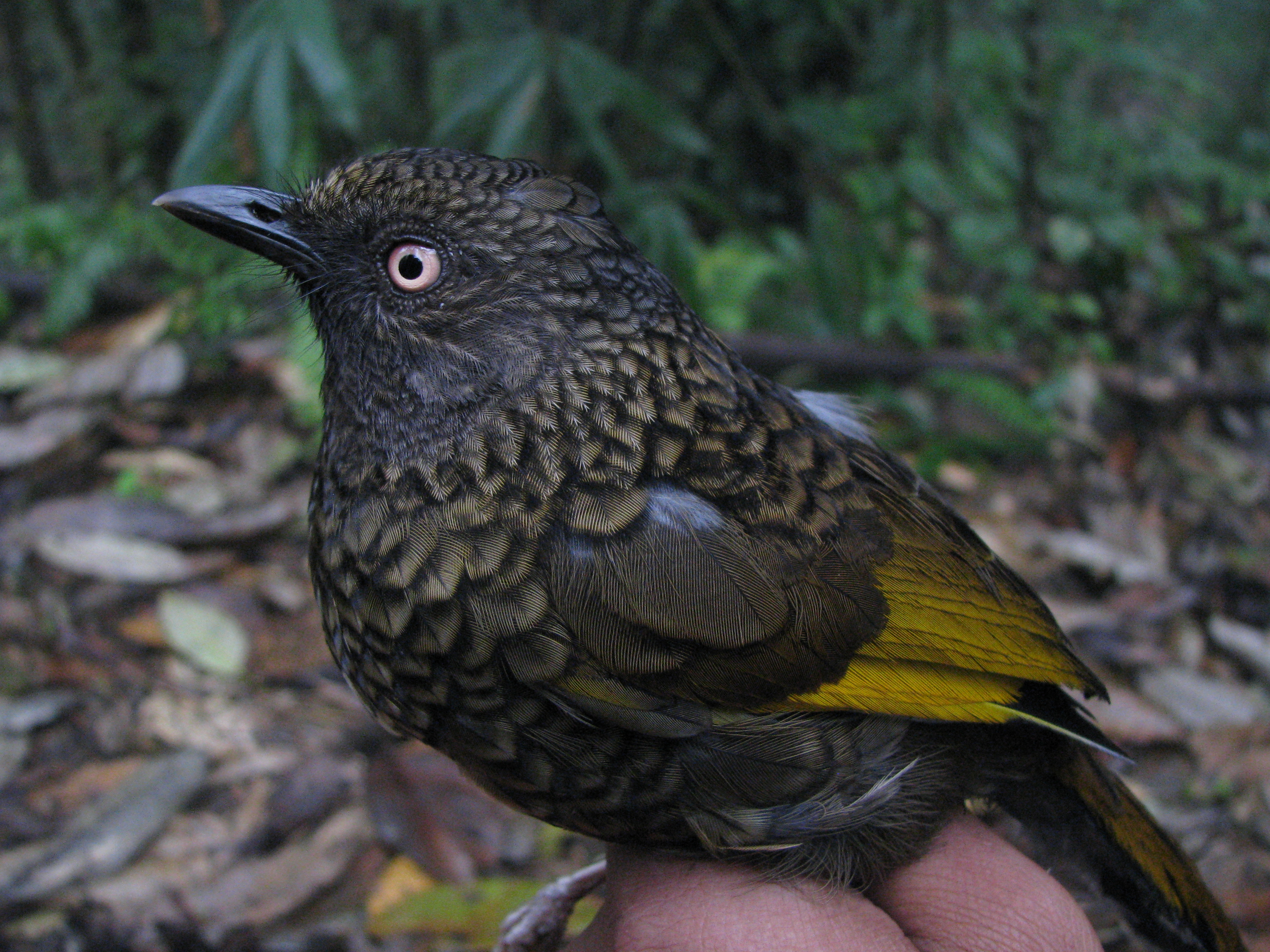
Garrulax subunicolor from Eaglenest WLS, Arunachal Pradesh, India.

It is found in Bhutan, China, India, Myanmar, Nepal, and Vietnam. Its natural habitat is subtropical or tropical moist montane forests.
