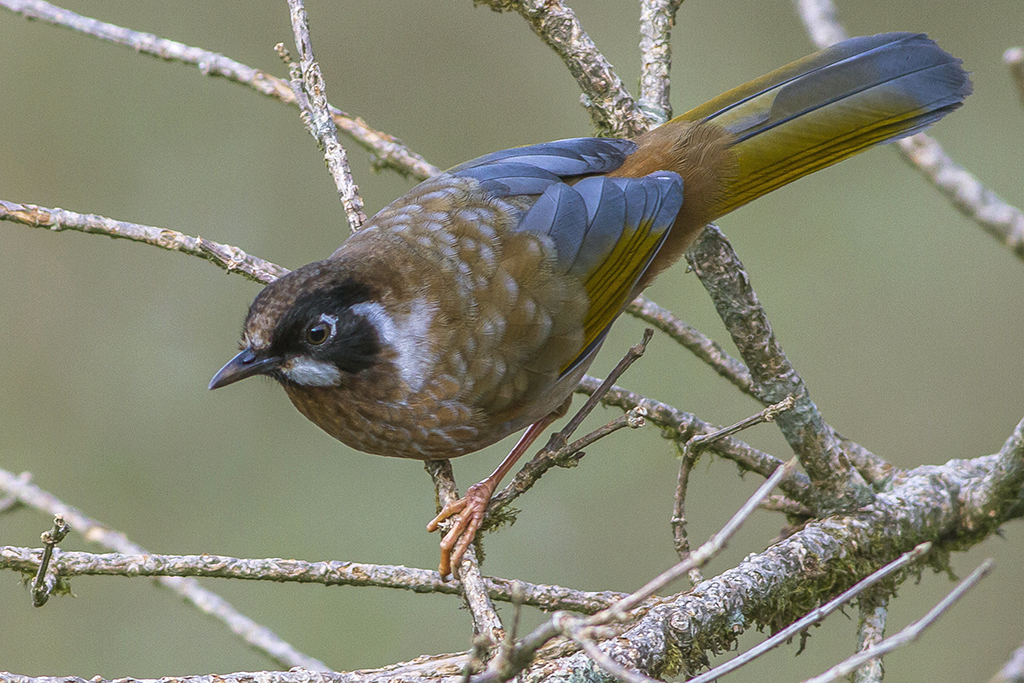
- Photographed from East Sikkim, India
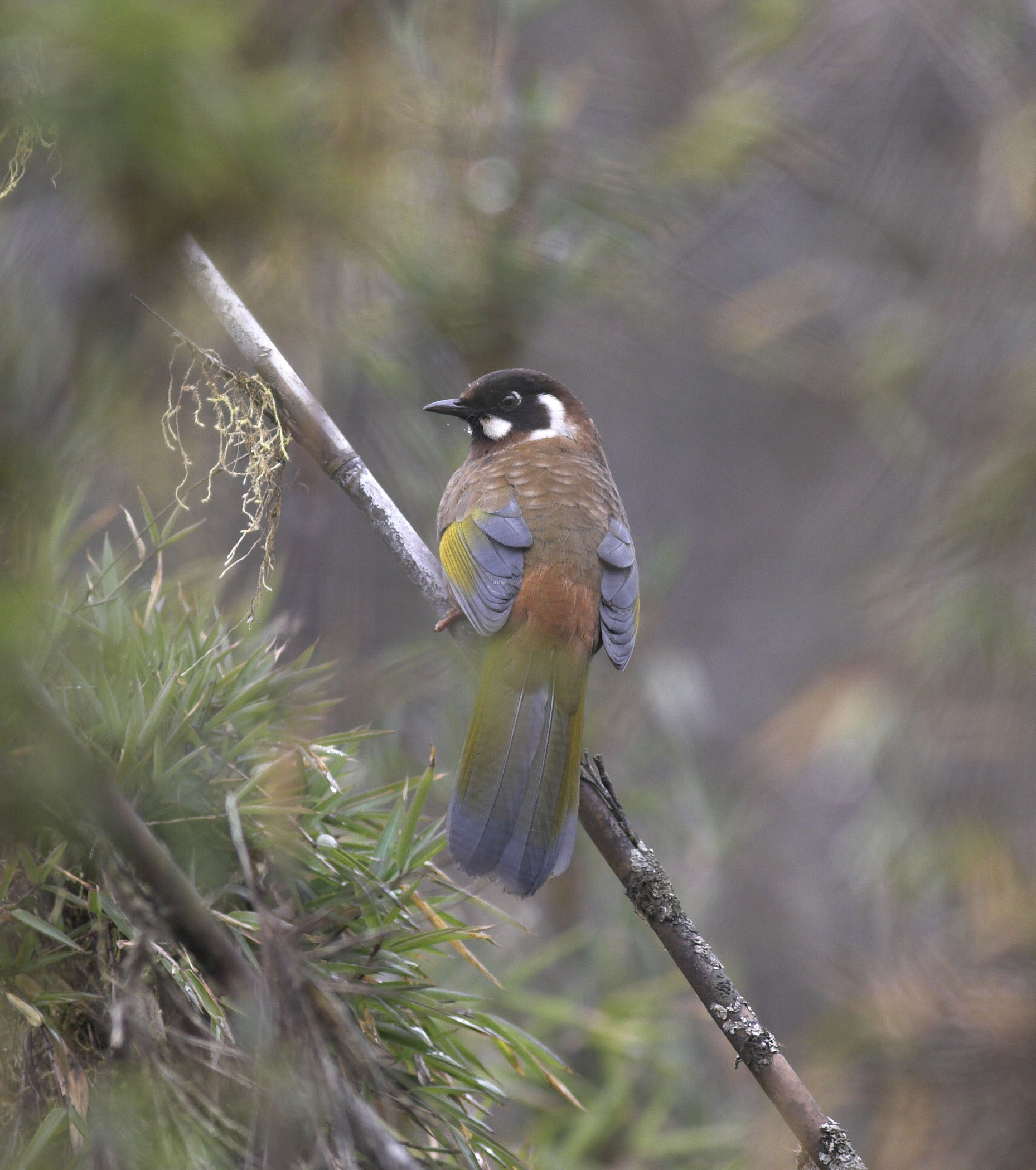

Conservation status
- Least Concern (IUCN 3.1)

Scientific classification
- Kingdom: Animalia
- Phylum: Chordata
- Class: Aves
- Order: Passeriformes
- Family: Leiothrichidae
- Genus: Trochalopteron
- Species: T. affine

Binomial name
- Trochalopteron affine (Blyth, 1843)

Synonyms
- Garrulax affinis

= Black-faced laughingthrush =

Species of bird

The black-faced laughingthrush (Trochalopteron affine) is a bird species in the family Leiothrichidae.

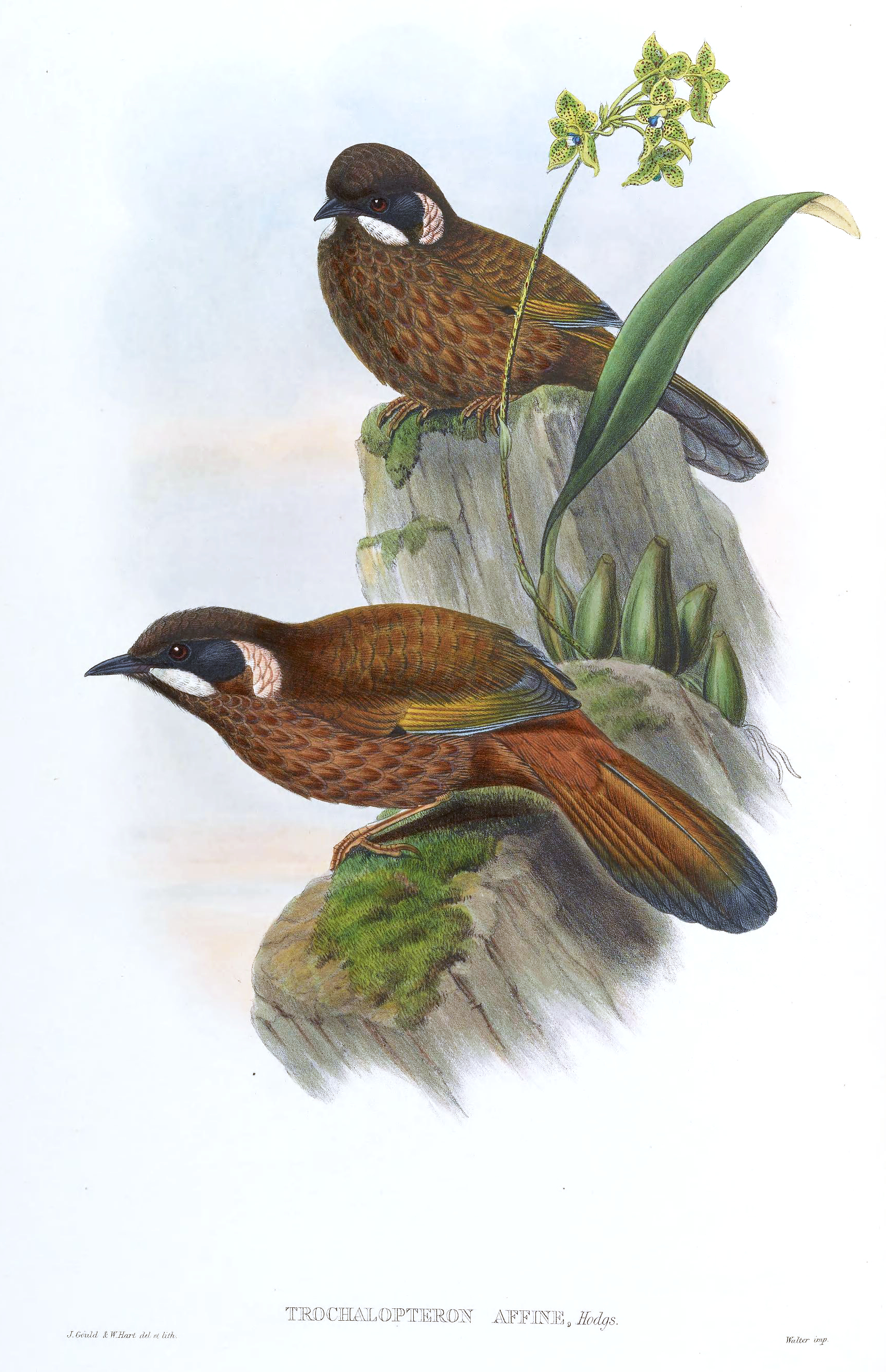

It is found in the Eastern Himalayas. Its range extends from eastern Nepal eastwards to Arunachal Pradesh in India and further to Myanmar, along with Bhutan and southeastern Tibet. Small disjunct populations also exist in continental Southeast Asia.
