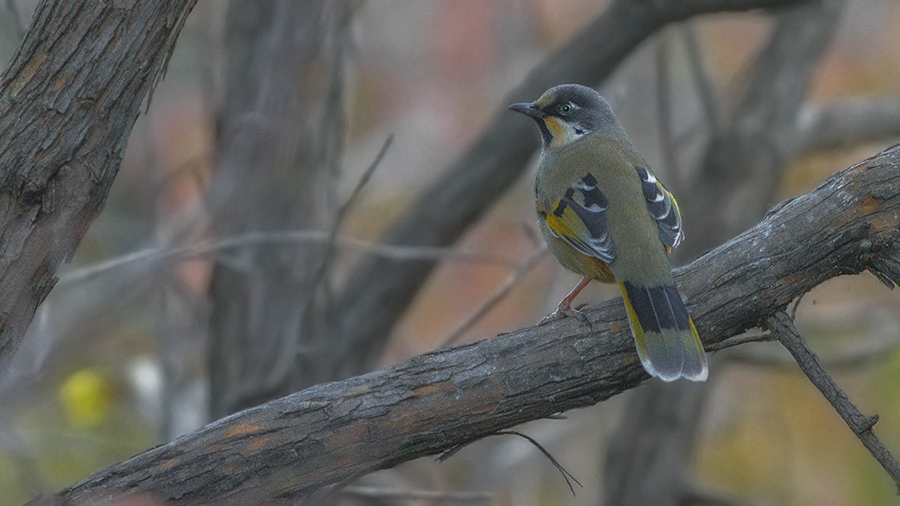
- T. v. variegatum from Kedarnath Wildlife Sanctuary, Uttarakhand, India.

Conservation status
- Least Concern (IUCN 3.1)

Scientific classification
- Kingdom: Animalia
- Phylum: Chordata
- Class: Aves
- Order: Passeriformes
- Family: Leiothrichidae
- Genus: Trochalopteron
- Species: T. variegatum

Binomial name
- Trochalopteron variegatum (Vigors, 1831)

Synonyms
- Garrulax variegatus

= Variegated laughingthrush =

Species of bird

The variegated laughingthrush (Trochalopteron variegatum) is a species of bird in the family Leiothrichidae. It is endemic to the northern regions of the Indian subcontinent, primarily the low-to-mid altitudes of the Himalayas. It ranges across Bhutan, India, Nepal and Tibet.

== Description ==
The variegated laughingthrush is a medium-sized laughingthrush typically 24-26 centimeters in length and weighs 57-79 grams. Both subspecies have a black stripe down the center of the throat and are overall olive and buffy in appearance. The large tail has a gray subterminal band with a white tip. The color of the outer rectrices vary based on the subspecies. T. v. variegatum has distinctive yellow primary and secondary feathers with cinnamon-tipped greater coverts and black primary coverts. T. v. variegatum has yellow outer rectrices. The area around the beak is black up until the eye, which is broken with a white eye-ring. Buff area at the base of the mandible fades to whitish. The T. v. variegatum subspecies has buff forehead with a brownish gray crown.

T. v. simile is similar to T. v. variegatum except it has gray primary and secondary feathers along with gray outer rectrices. The area around the lower mandible is whiter in this subspecies and the buff on the forehead is more dull.

== Gallery ==
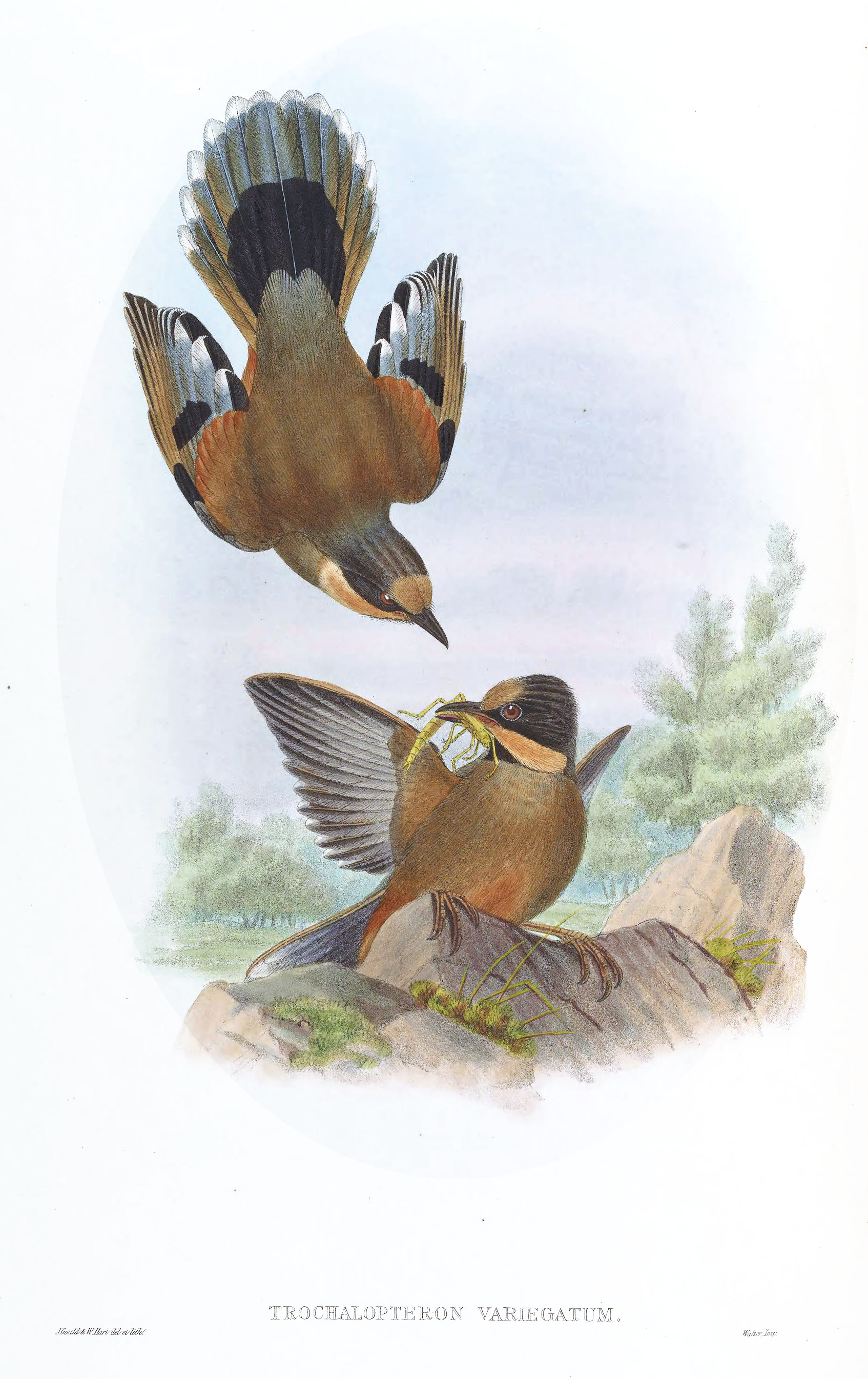
Illustration by J. Gould and W. Hart

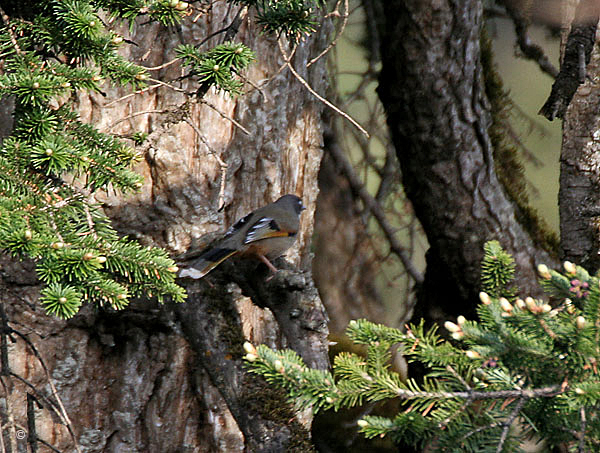
At Kullu - Manali District of Himachal Pradesh, India

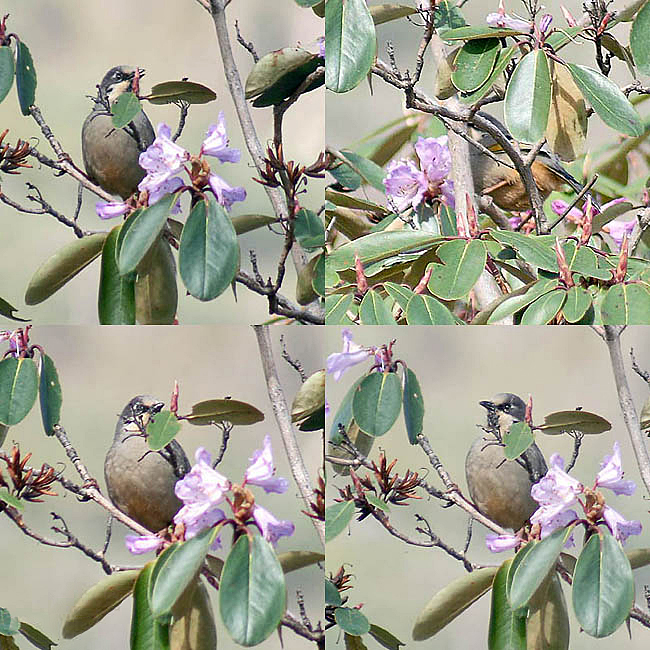
At Kullu - Manali District of Himachal Pradesh, India
