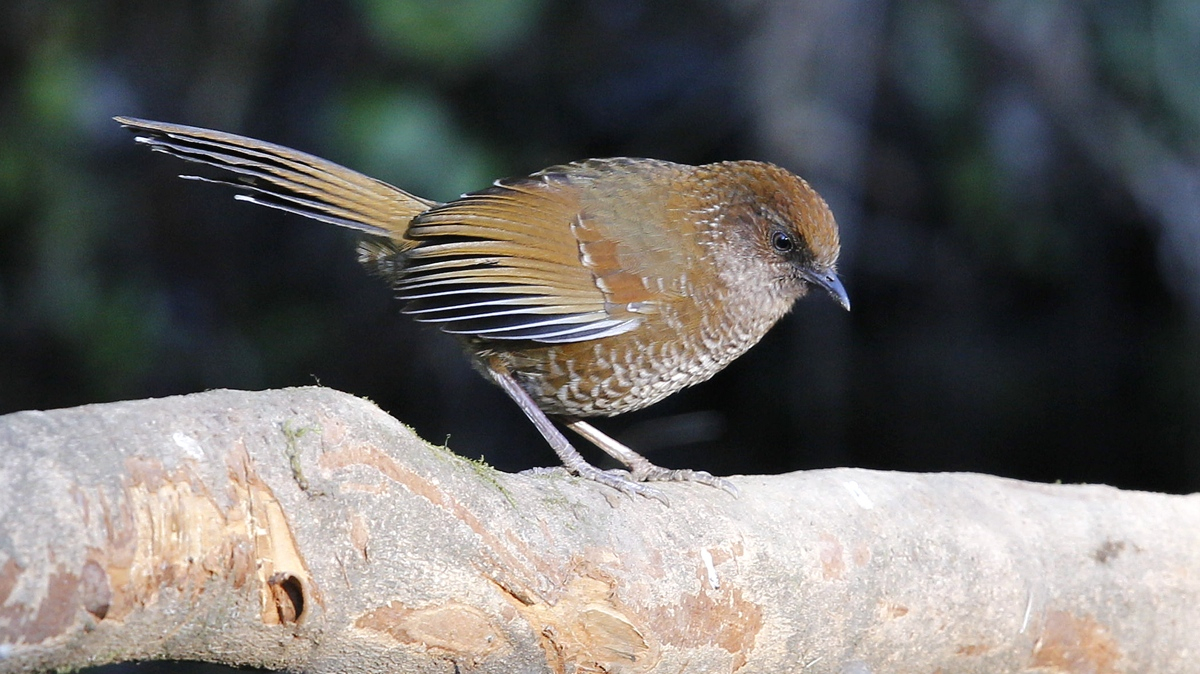

Conservation status
- Least Concern (IUCN 3.1)

Scientific classification
- Kingdom: Animalia
- Phylum: Chordata
- Class: Aves
- Order: Passeriformes
- Family: Leiothrichidae
- Genus: Trochalopteron
- Species: T. austeni

Binomial name
- Trochalopteron austeni Godwin-Austen, 1870

Synonyms
- Garrulax austeni

= Brown-capped laughingthrush =

Species of bird

The brown-capped laughingthrush (Trochalopteron austeni) is a species of bird in the family Leiothrichidae. It is found in the Patkai range, where its natural habitat is subtropical and tropical moist montane forests.
