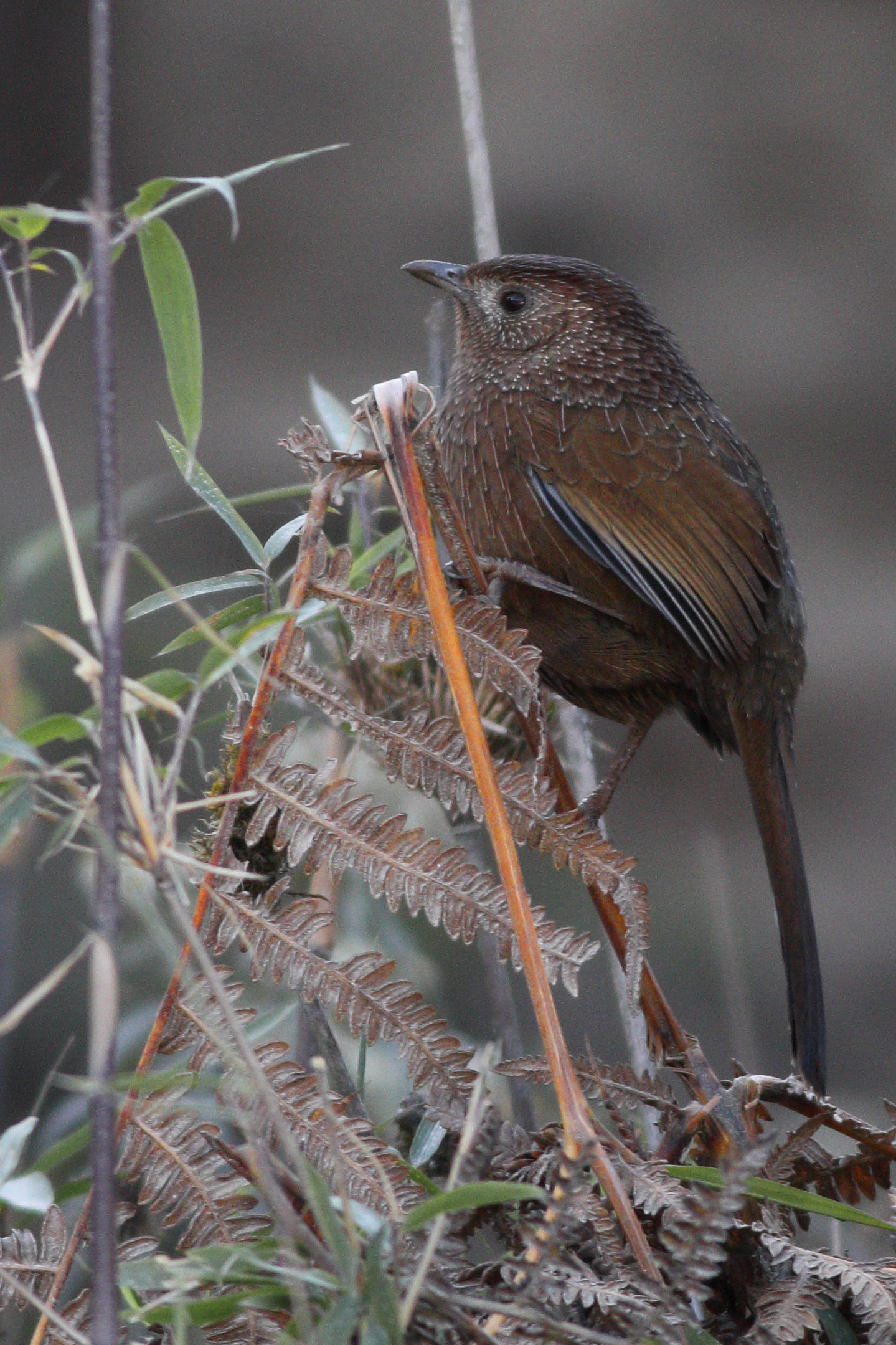
- from Trashigang, Bhutan

Conservation status
- Least Concern (IUCN 3.1)

Scientific classification
- Kingdom: Animalia
- Phylum: Chordata
- Class: Aves
- Order: Passeriformes
- Family: Leiothrichidae
- Genus: Trochalopteron
- Species: T. imbricatum

Binomial name
- Trochalopteron imbricatum (Blyth, 1843)

Synonyms
- Garrulax lineatus imbricatus Garrulax imbricatus

= Bhutan laughingthrush =

Species of bird

The Bhutan laughingthrush (Trochalopteron imbricatum) is a species of bird in the family Leiothrichidae. It is commonly found in Bhutan and some adjoining areas in India. It was formerly considered a subspecies of the streaked laughingthrush, G. lineatus, hence its alternate common name of Himalayan streaked laughingthrush.

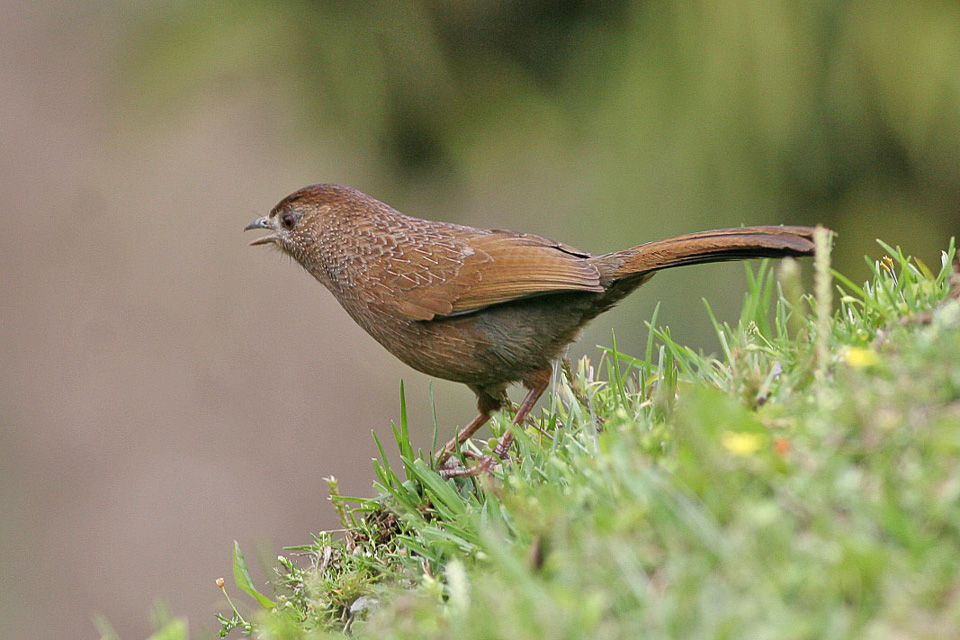
