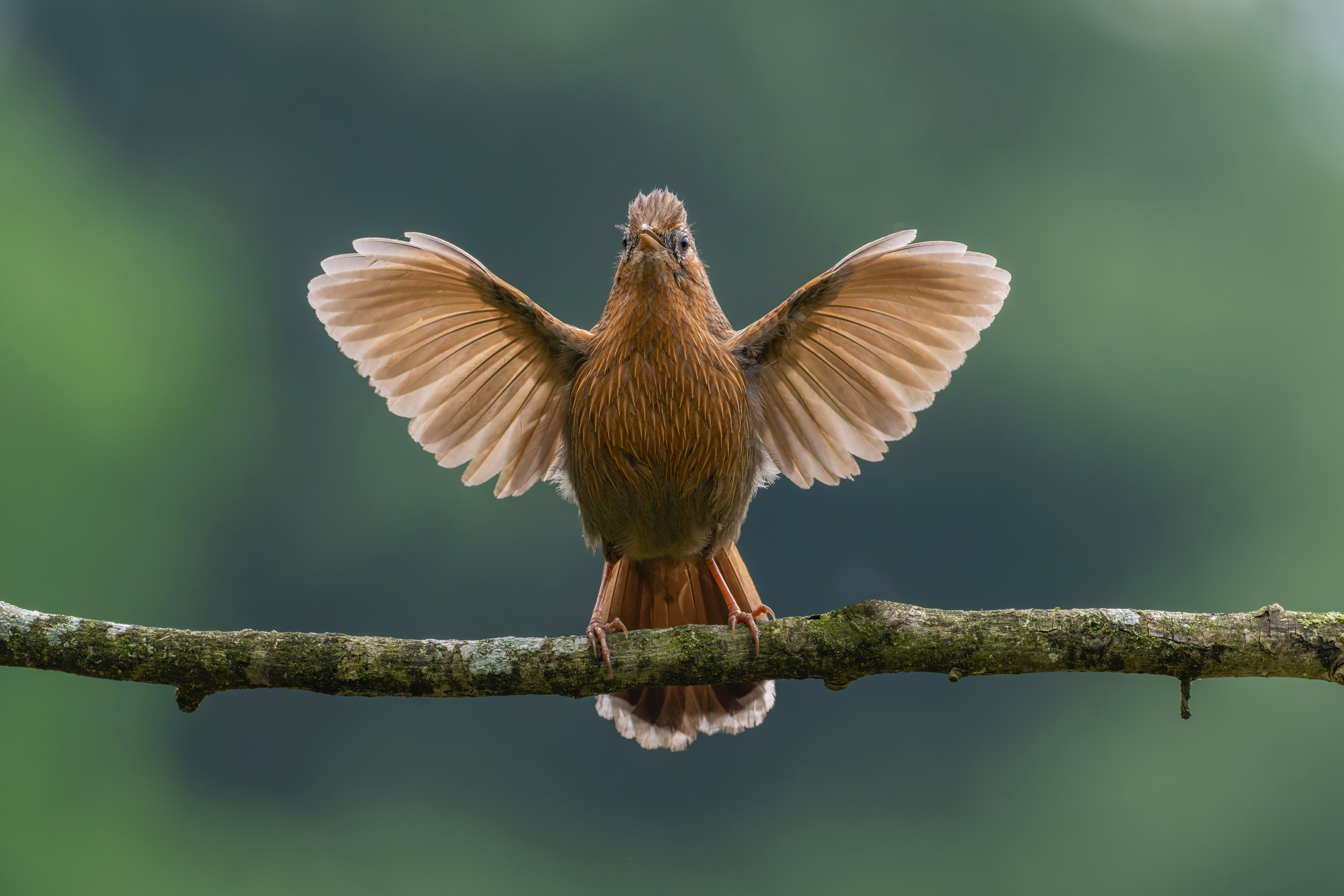
- Dancing Streaked Laughingthrush at Shivapurt National Park, Nepal.

Conservation status
- Least Concern (IUCN 3.1)

Scientific classification
- Kingdom: Animalia
- Phylum: Chordata
- Class: Aves
- Order: Passeriformes
- Family: Leiothrichidae
- Genus: Trochalopteron
- Species: T. lineatum

Binomial name
- Trochalopteron lineatum (Vigors, 1831)

Synonyms
- Garrulax lineatus

= Streaked laughingthrush =

Species of bird

The streaked laughingthrush (Trochalopteron lineatum) is a species of bird in the family Leiothrichidae.

Its range extends from the Turkestan Range to the Safed Koh and east through the Himalayas towards Sikkim. The subspecies imbricatum is usually considered a separates species, Bhutan laughingthrush.

== Gallery ==
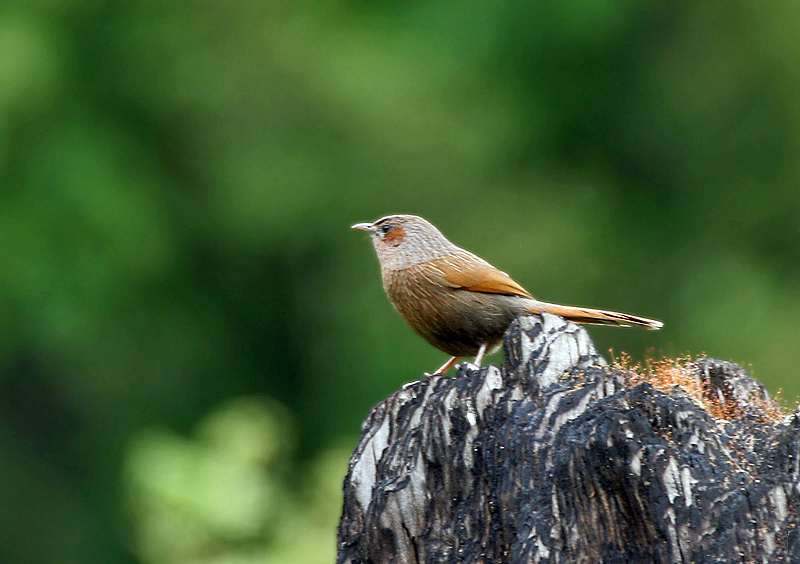
in Nainital, Uttarakhand and - Manali District of Himachal Pradesh, India.

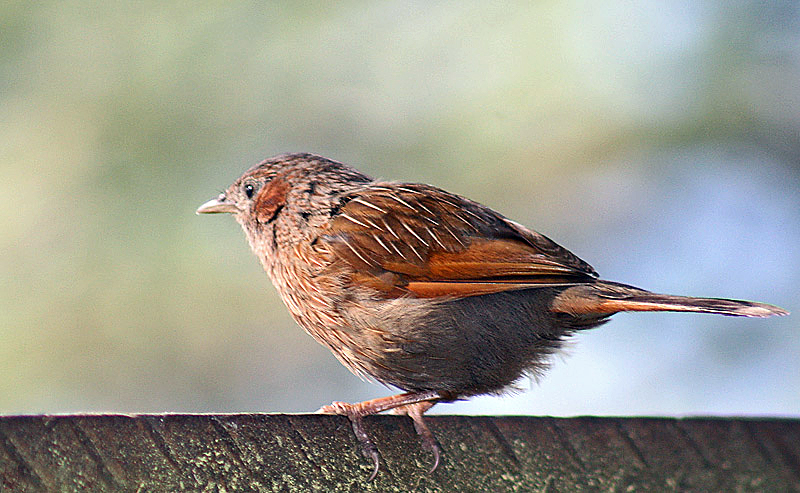
in Kullu - Manali District of Himachal Pradesh and Nainital Uttarakhand, India.

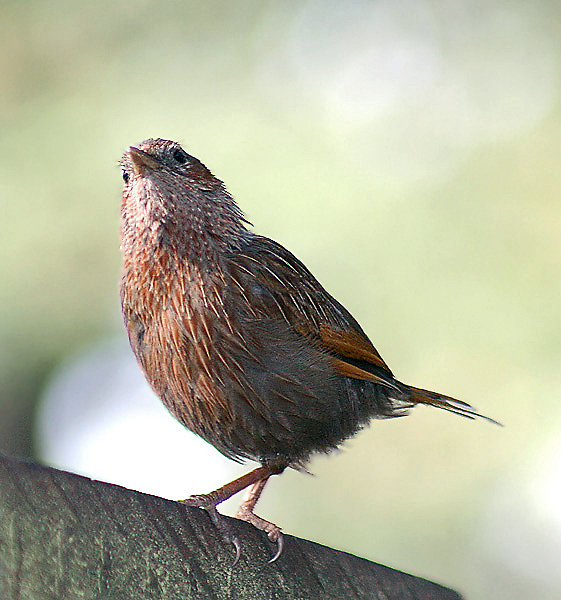
in Nainital Uttarakhand and Manali District of Himachal Pradesh, India.

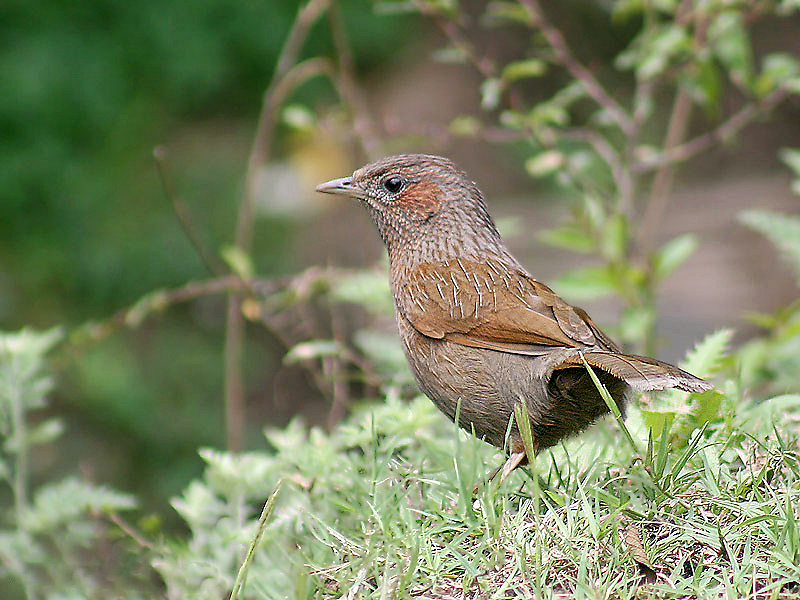
Nainital Uttarakhand, india

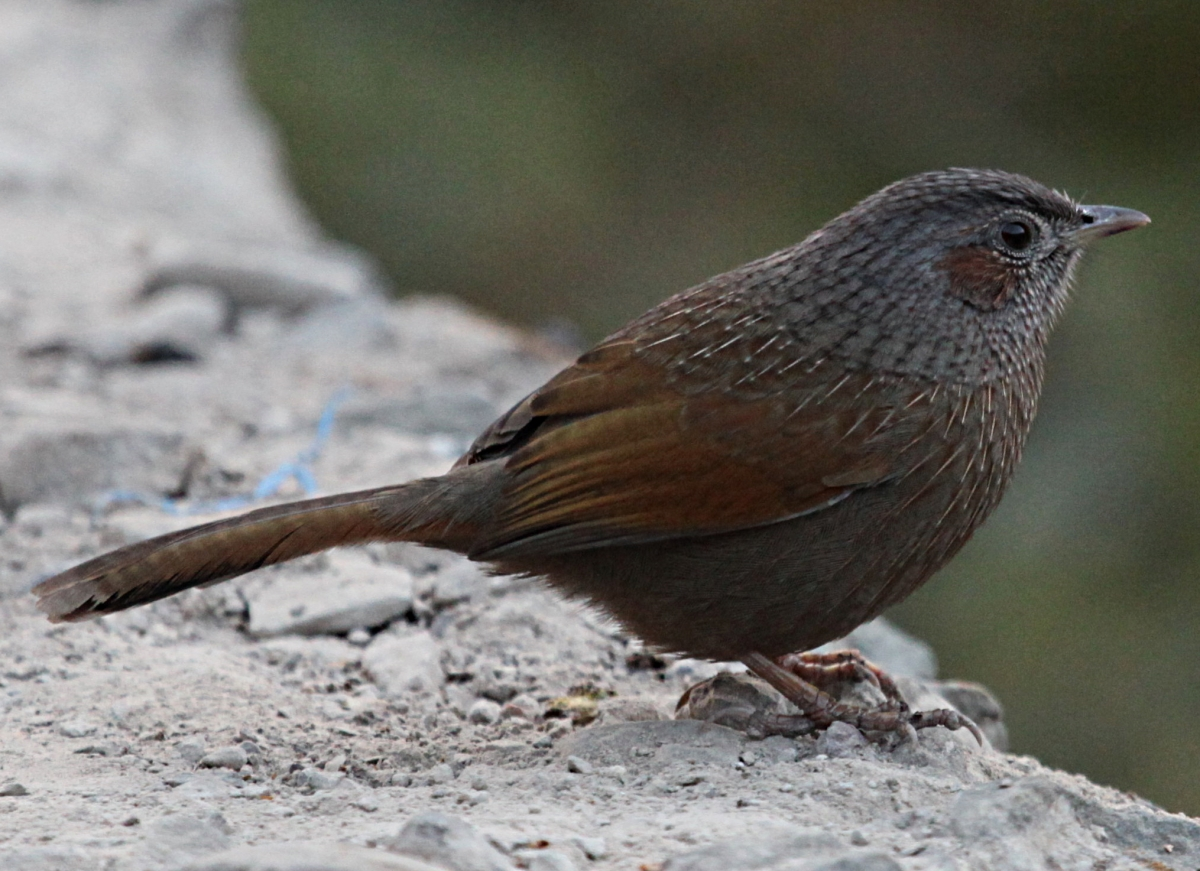
Streaked laughingthrush at Uttarakhand
