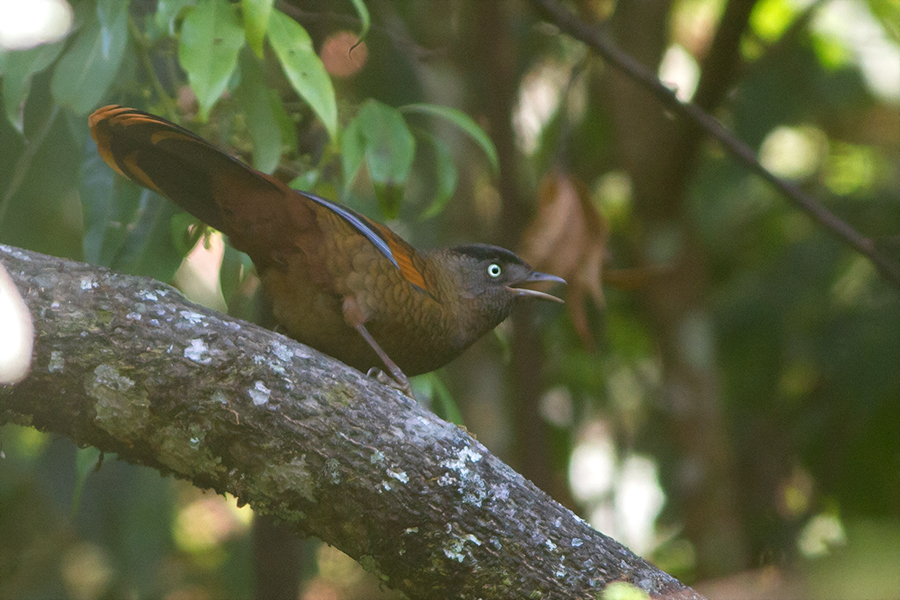

Conservation status
- Least Concern (IUCN 3.1)

Scientific classification
- Kingdom: Animalia
- Phylum: Chordata
- Class: Aves
- Order: Passeriformes
- Family: Leiothrichidae
- Genus: Trochalopteron
- Species: T. squamatum

Binomial name
- Trochalopteron squamatum (Gould, 1835)

Synonyms
- Garrulax squamatus

= Blue-winged laughingthrush =

Species of bird

The blue-winged laughingthrush (Trochalopteron squamatum) is a bird in the family Leiothrichidae. It is found in Eastern Himalaya, Yunnan, Myanmar and Laos where its natural habitat is the dense undergrowth of subtropical or tropical moist broadleaved evergreen montane forests.

== Behavior ==
It has been described as secretive.
