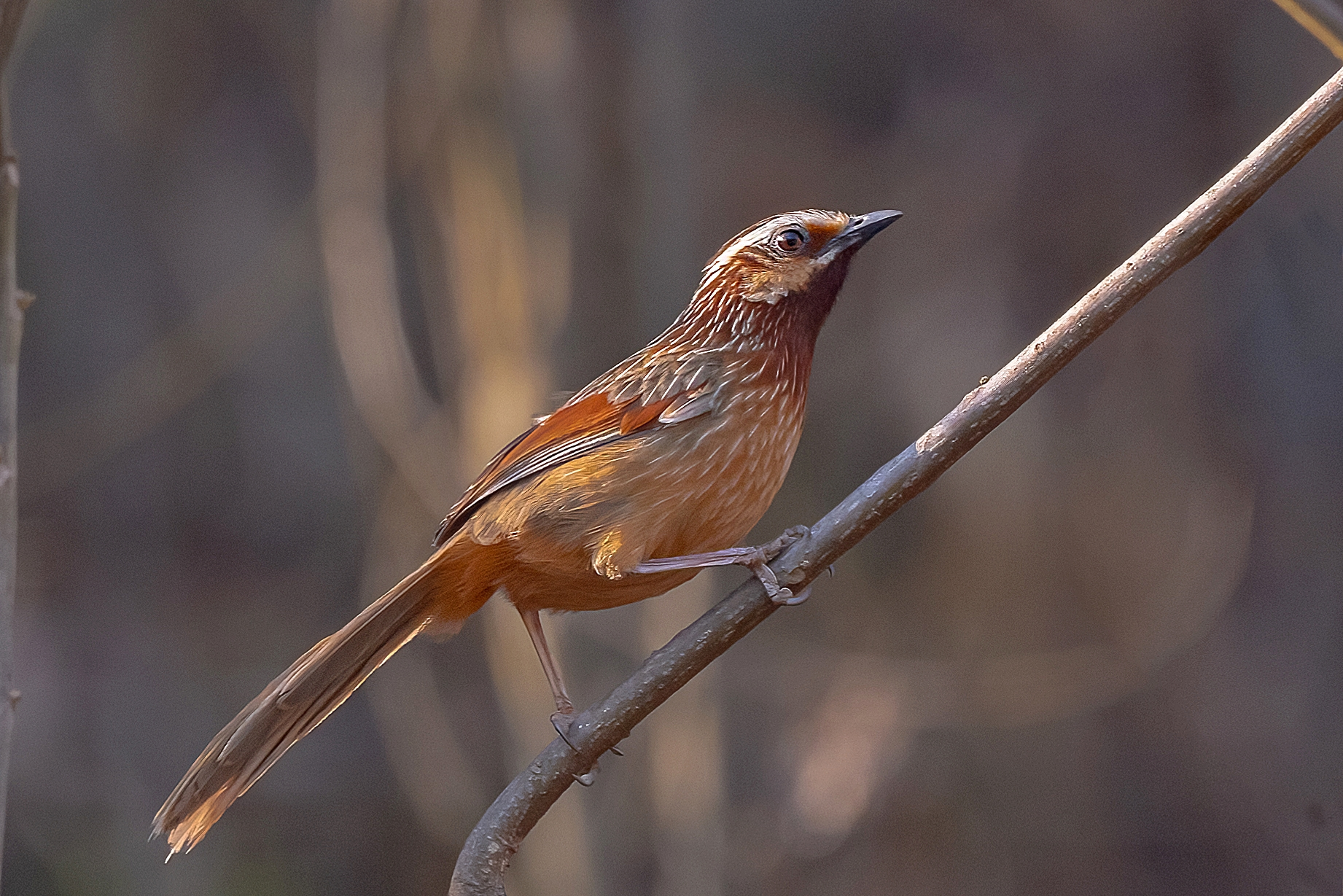
- From Khonoma, Nagaland, India

Conservation status
- Least Concern (IUCN 3.1)

Scientific classification
- Kingdom: Animalia
- Phylum: Chordata
- Class: Aves
- Order: Passeriformes
- Family: Leiothrichidae
- Genus: Trochalopteron
- Species: T. virgatum

Binomial name
- Trochalopteron virgatum Godwin-Austen, 1874

Synonyms
- Garrulax virgatus

= Striped laughingthrush =

Species of bird

The striped laughingthrush (Trochalopteron virgatum) is a species of bird in the family Leiothrichidae.

It is found in the Patkai range, where its natural habitat is subtropical or tropical moist montane forests.

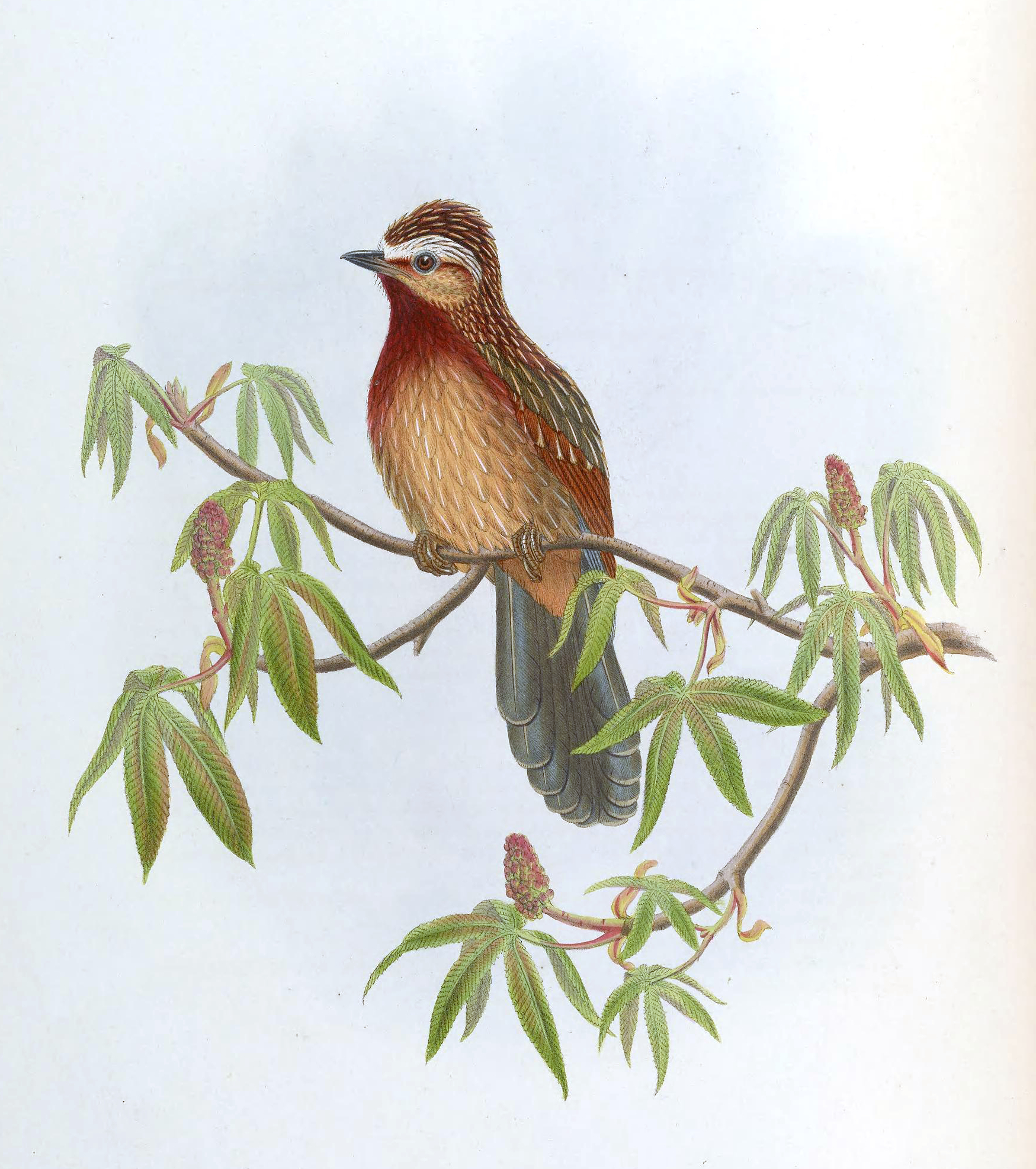
Gould's painting
