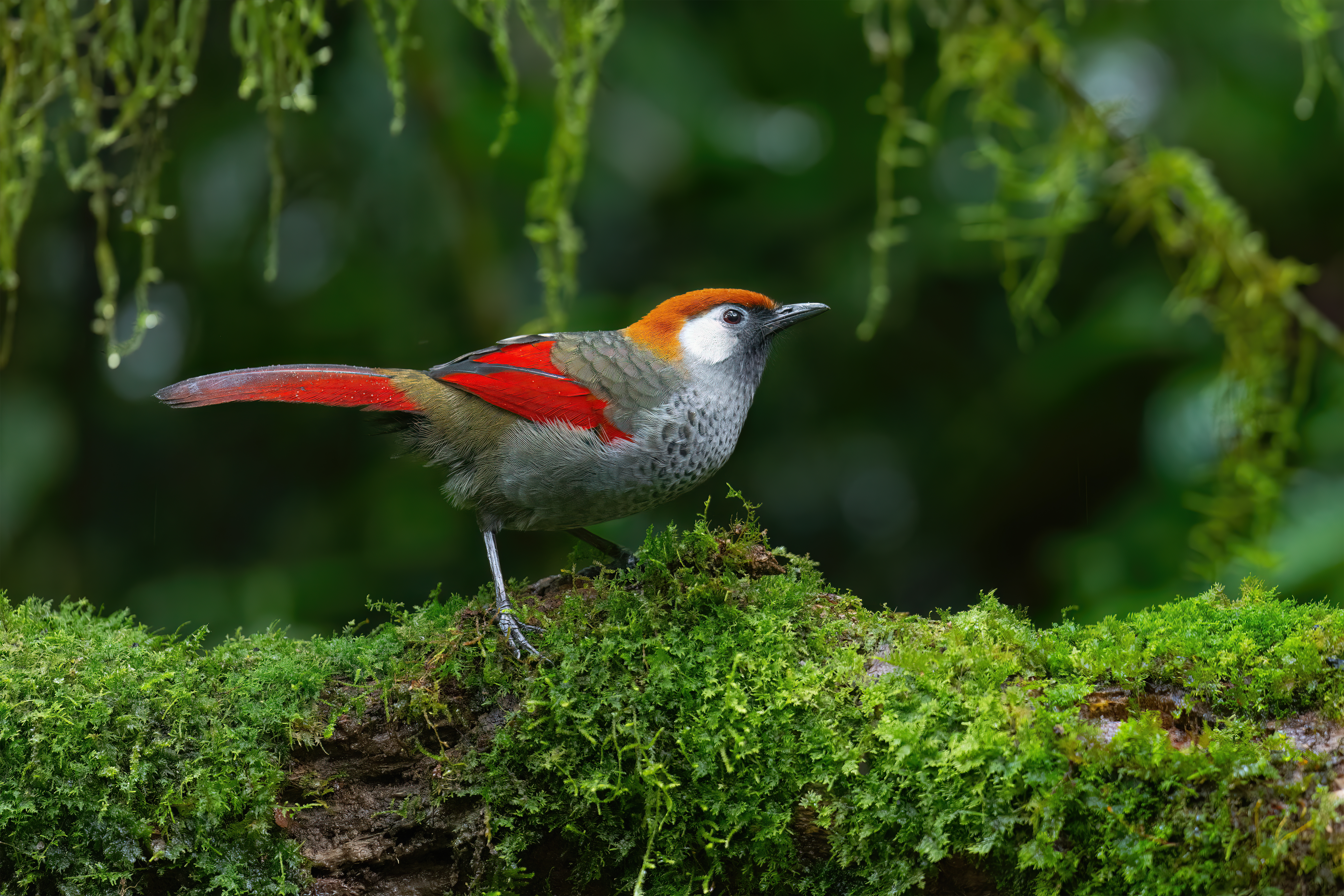
- In the Ngọc Linh Nature Reserve, Vietnam

Conservation status
- Least Concern (IUCN 3.1)

Scientific classification
- Kingdom: Animalia
- Phylum: Chordata
- Class: Aves
- Order: Passeriformes
- Family: Leiothrichidae
- Genus: Trochalopteron
- Species: T. milnei

Binomial name
- Trochalopteron milnei David, A, 1874

Synonyms
- Garrulax milnei (David, 1874)

= Red-tailed laughingthrush =

Species of bird

The red-tailed laughingthrush (Trochalopteron milnei) is a species of bird in the laughingthrush family Leiothrichidae. It is found in the montane forests of Myanmar, Laos, southern China and central Vietnam.

== Taxonomy ==
The red-tailed laughingthrush was formally described in 1874 by the French Catholic priest and naturalist Armand David under the current binomial name Trochalopteron milnei, with the type locality in west Fujian province, China. The genus name combines the Ancient Greek trokhalos meaning "round" or "bowed" with pteron meaning "wing". The specific epithet milnei was chosen to honour the French zoologist Alphonse Milne-Edwards.

Four subspecies are recognised:

- T. m. sharpei Rippon, G, 1901 – north Myanmar and south China to northwest Thailand and north Indochina
- T. m. vitryi (Delacour, 1932) – south Laos
- T. m. sinianum Stresemann, 1930 – southeast China (except northwest Fujian)
- T. m. milnei David, A, 1874 – northwest Fujian

== Description ==
Video clip

The red-tailed laughingthrush has an overall length of about 26–28 cm (10–11 in) and a weight of about 66–93 g (2.3–3.3 oz). It is dull ochrous-grey, with a bright rufous-chestnut crown and a blackish face, with whitish ear-coverts. Wings and tail are crimson. The sexes are similar.

== Distribution and habitat ==
This species can be found in China, Laos, Myanmar, Thailand, and Vietnam. These birds mainly inhabit the understorey of broadleaf evergreen forests.

They are strictly montane, usually living at an elevation of 1,800–2,500 metres (5,900–8,200 ft) above sea level.

== Behaviour ==
=== Food and feeding ===
This species mainly feeds on insects and small arthropods (beetles, centipedes, etc.), but also on berries and fruits (especially of Saurauia species).

=== Breeding ===
The breeding season lasts from April to June. The nest is made by both sexes and consists of a tidy cup mainly made of grasses and bamboo leaves. It is built up to 1 m (3 ft 3 in) above the ground level. The clutch of 2–3 eggs is incubated for 17–18 days. The chicks are fed by both parents and leave the nest when aged 14–16 days.
