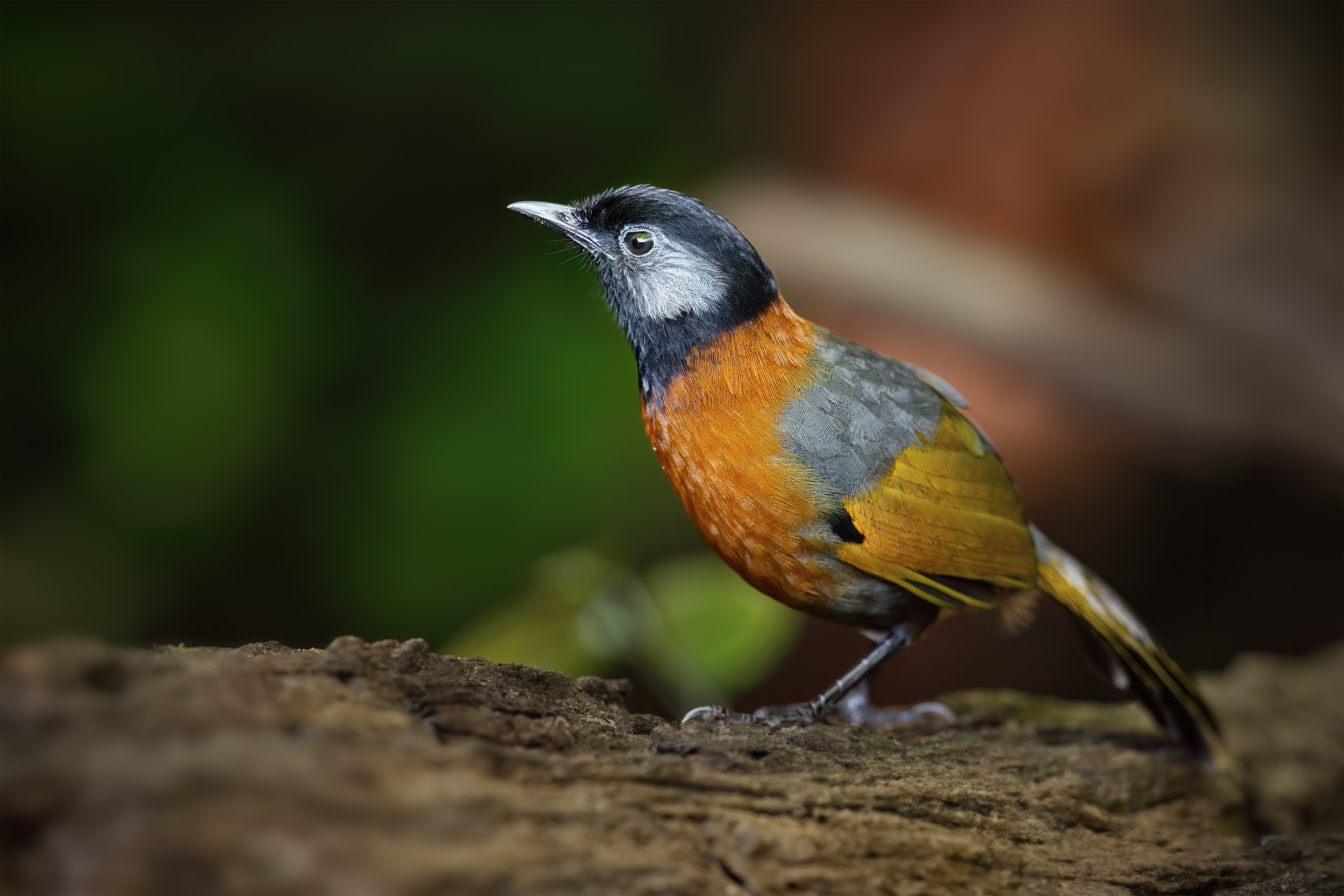

Conservation status
- Endangered (IUCN 3.1)

Scientific classification
- Kingdom: Animalia
- Phylum: Chordata
- Class: Aves
- Order: Passeriformes
- Family: Leiothrichidae
- Genus: Trochalopteron
- Species: T. yersini

Binomial name
- Trochalopteron yersini Robinson & Kloss, 1919

Synonyms
- Garrulax yersini

= Collared laughingthrush =

Species of bird

The collared laughingthrush (Trochalopteron yersini) is a species of bird in the family Leiothrichidae. It is endemic to Vietnam.

Its natural habitats are subtropical or tropical moist montane forests and subtropical or tropical high-altitude shrubland. It is threatened by habitat loss.
