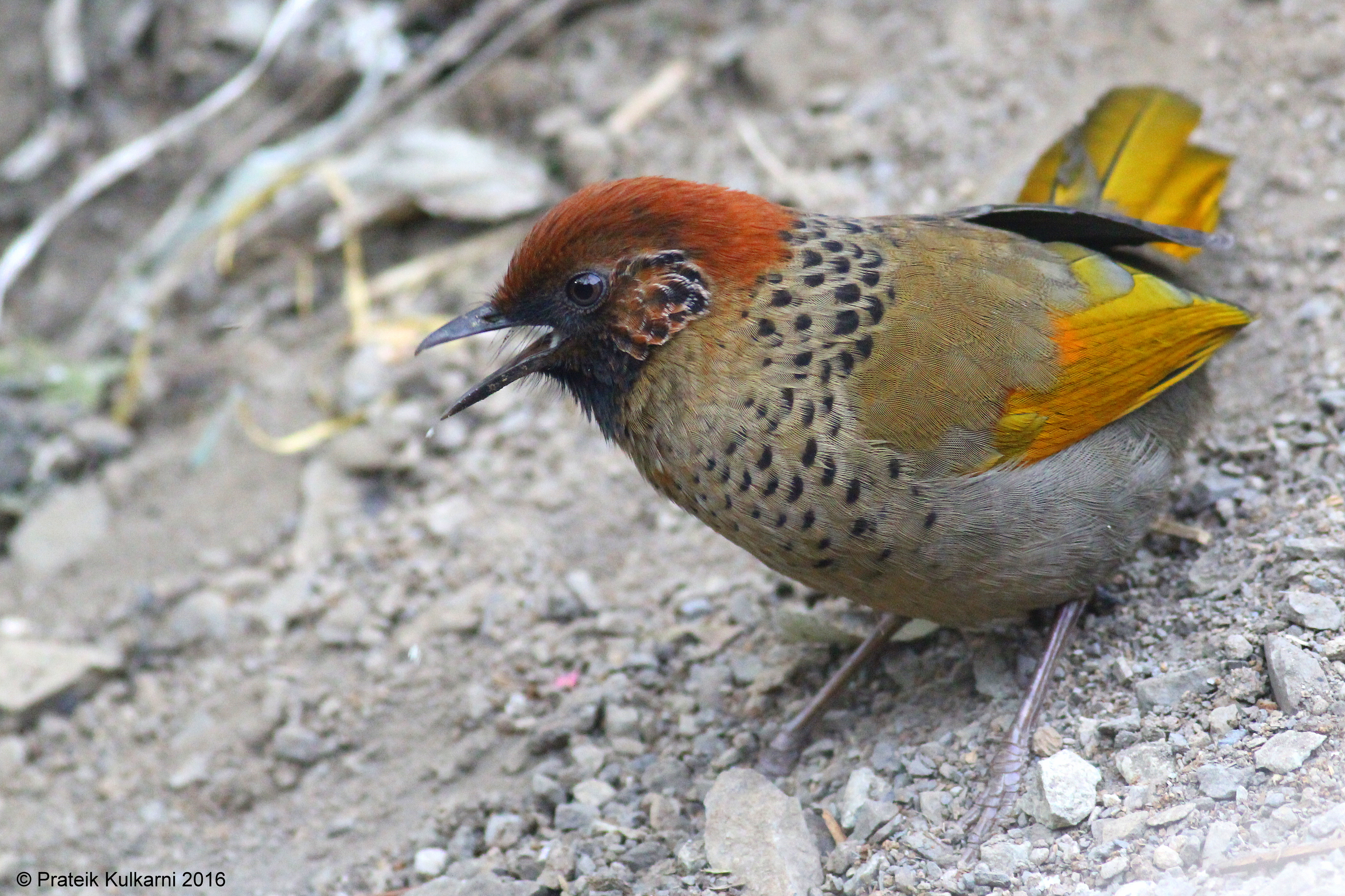
- Near Pangot of Nainital district, Uttarakhand, India

Conservation status
- Least Concern (IUCN 3.1)

Scientific classification
- Kingdom: Animalia
- Phylum: Chordata
- Class: Aves
- Order: Passeriformes
- Family: Leiothrichidae
- Genus: Trochalopteron
- Species: T. erythrocephalum

Binomial name
- Trochalopteron erythrocephalum (Vigors, 1832)

Synonyms
- Garrulax erythrocephalus

= Chestnut-crowned laughingthrush =

Species of bird

The chestnut-crowned laughingthrush (Trochalopteron erythrocephalum) is a species of bird in the family Leiothrichidae. It is found in Bhutan, China, India, Pakistan and Nepal.

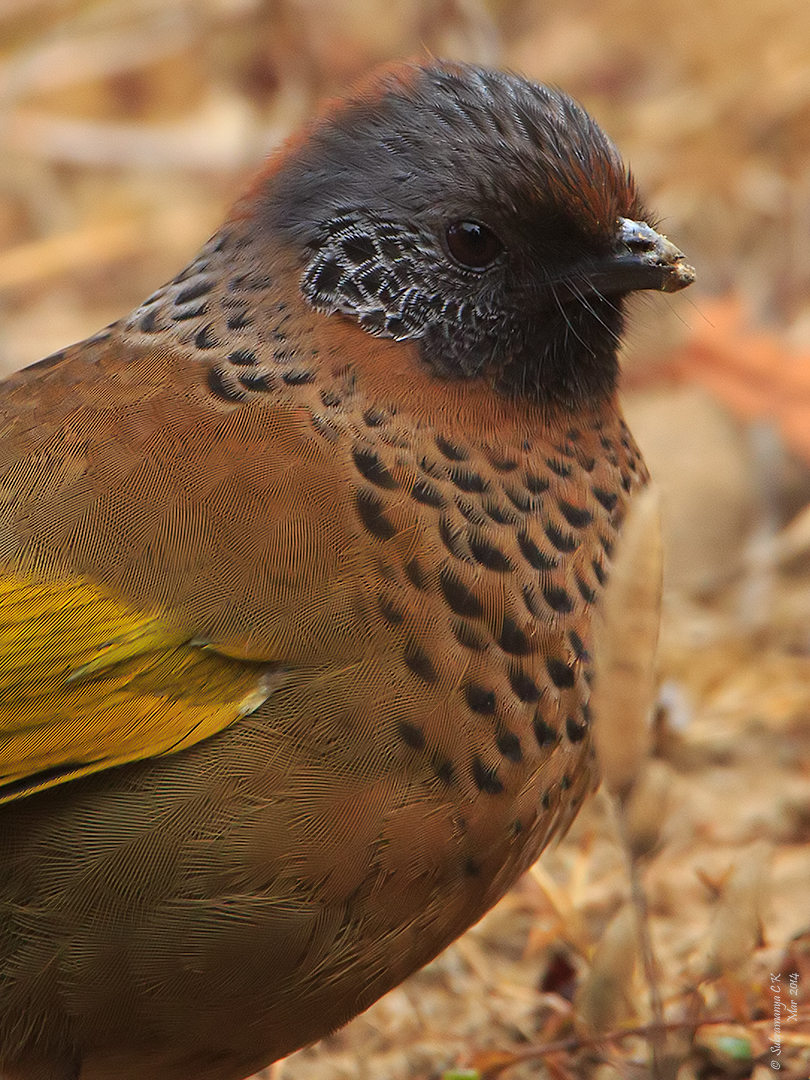
A specimen with beak deformities from Neora Valley National Park, West Bengal, India.

Contact call

Calls

The silver-eared laughingthrush, formerly included as a subspecies, is now usually regarded as a separate species.
