= Lengteng Wildlife Sanctuary =

- IUCN category IV (habitat/species management area)
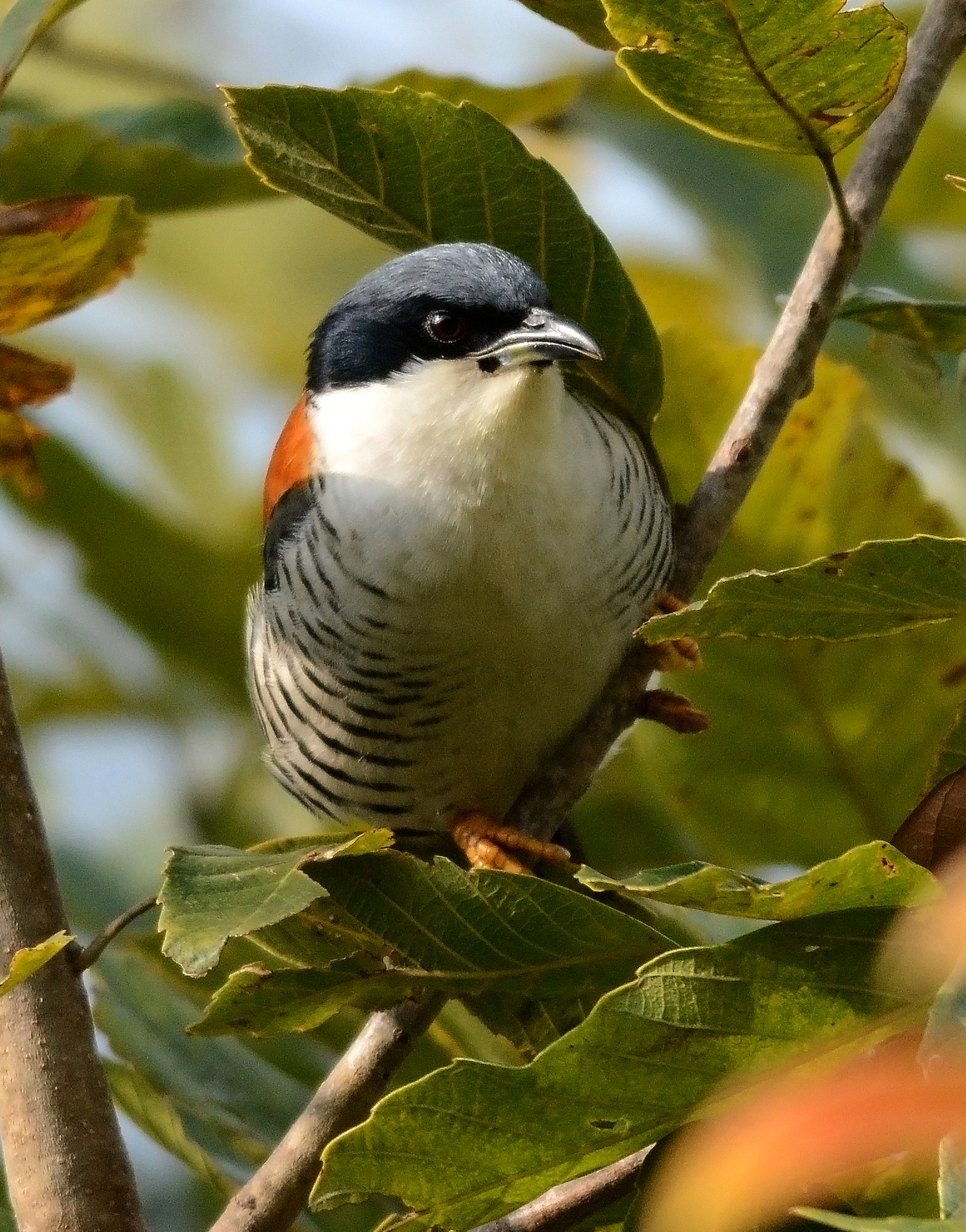
- Himalayan Cutia at the Lengteng Wildlife Sanctuary

- Location within Mizoram Location within India
- Interactive map of Lengteng Wildlife Sanctuary
- Location: near the Myanmar border in Champhai District, India
- Nearest city: Ngopa
- Coordinates: 23°50′00″N 93°13′00″E
- Area: 120 km^{2} (46 sq mi)
- Established: 1999; 27 years ago
- Governing body: Department of Environment and Forests, Government of Mizoram

Lengteng Wildlife Sanctuary is a protected area in Saitual district in eastern Mizoram, northeast India. It is an alpine forest and contains the second highest peak in Mizoram. It is specially a conservation interest on rare species of birds. It was declared a protected area in 1999, and a national wildlife sanctuary by the Indian Ministry of Environment and Forests on 31 May 2001.

== Geography ==
Lengteng Wildlife Sanctuary is located in Champhai district, only a few kilometres from Indo-Burma border and north of Murlen National Park. It lies adjacent to the village Lamzawl, and the nearest town is Ngopa. Selam village is within the sanctuary. It is at an altitude of 400-2,141 m asl. It covers an area of 12,000 ha (30,000 acres). It consists of several mountain peaks, and one of them is the second highest in all of Mizoram. Vegetation types are tropical evergreen forest and sub-tropical montane forest.

== Vegetation ==
Lengteng is densely covered with evergreen and semi-evergreen trees. Major trees are Quercus leucotrichophora, Lithocarpus dealbata, Schima wallichii, Lyonia ovalifolia and Vaccinium sprengelii. Common herbs are Ageratum adenophorum, Maesa indica and Eurya cerasifolia.

== Wildlife ==
Lengteng is home to a variety of animal species including birds. The most notable birds are the dark-rumped swift, grey sibia, Mrs. Hume's pheasant, grey peacock pheasant, Oriental pied hornbill, rufous-bellied eagle, and white-naped yuhina. Blyth's tragopan was also reported from a survey in 2011. Common animal species include tiger, leopard, sambar deer, barking deer, goral, serow, hoolock gibbon, rhesus macaque and wild boars. An IUCN-classified vulnerable species of primate, northern pig-tailed macaque is reported here.

== Conservation ==
Lengteng was declared a national wildlife sanctuary by the Ministry of Environment and Forests, Government of India. The administration is under the state government through the Department of Environment and Forests. There had long been conservation problems among the native inhabitants such as villagers of Kawlbem, who had religious tradition of hunting wild animals for New Year feasts. The practise was stopped in 2010 under pressure from the government.
