= Phawngpui National Park =

National park in Mizoram, India

- IUCN category II (national park)
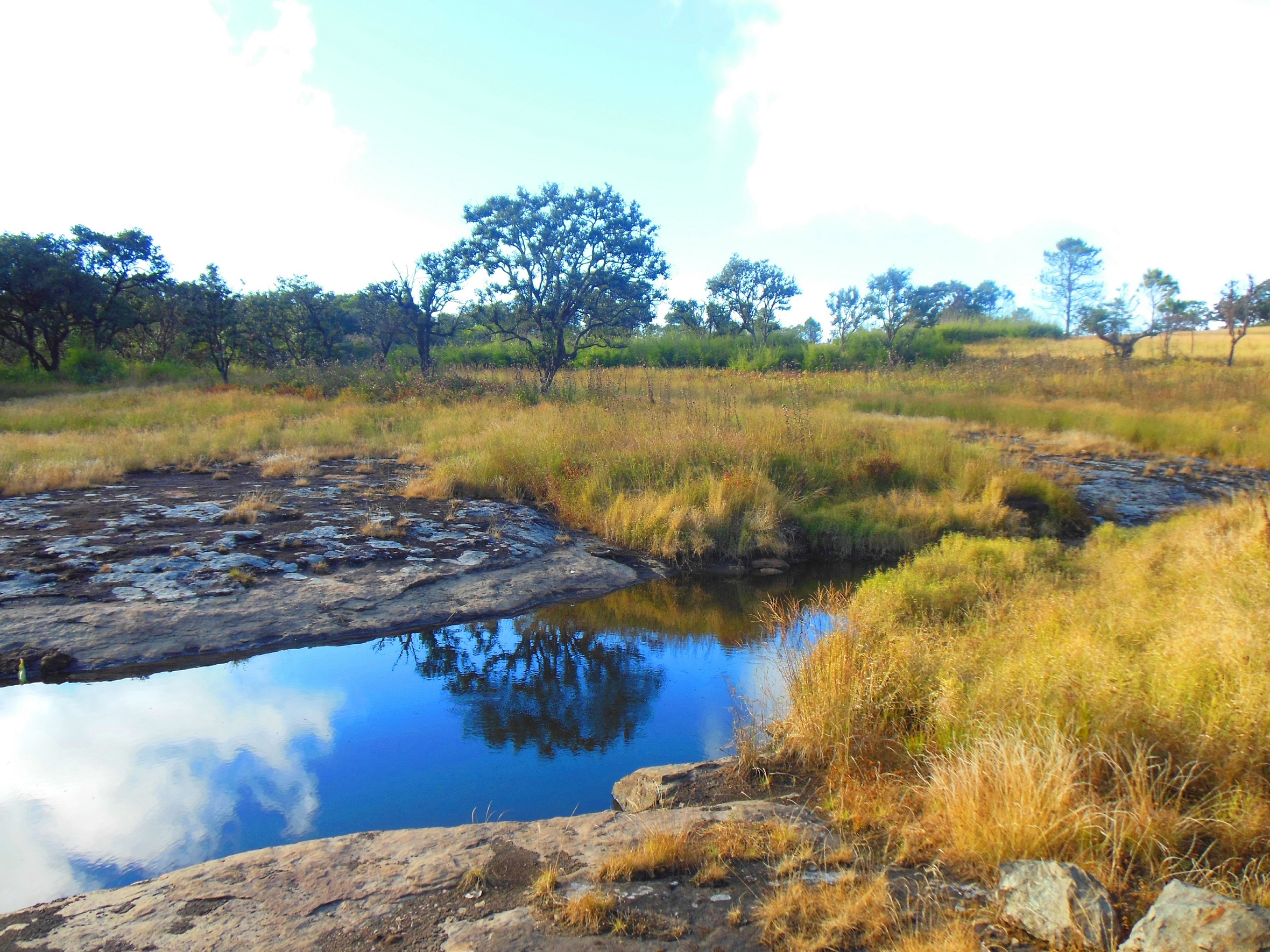

- Location within Mizoram Location within India
- Interactive map of Phawngpui National Park
- Location: Mizoram, India
- Nearest city: Aizawl
- Coordinates: 22°40′N 93°03′E
- Area: 50 square kilometres (19 sq mi)
- Established: 1992
- Visitors: 469 (in 2012-2013)
- Governing body: Department of Environment and Forests, Government of Mizoram

Phawngpui National Park or Phawngpui Blue Mountain National Park is one of the two national parks of India in Mizoram, the other and the larger being Murlen National Park. It is about 300 km from the main city Aizawl, located in the Lawngtlai district, towards the southeast of Mizoram and relatively close to Burma. It bears the name of the mountain Phawngpui, often called the Blue Mountain of Mizoram, which is the highest mountain peak in the state, reaching 2,157 m asl. The national park covers the entire mountain along with the surrounding reserve forest.

== Geography ==
The mountain area of Phawngpui is at most times covered by a thin stretch of clouds, which makes it blue in appearance from a distance, hence the name Blue Mountain. The temperature therefore is mild throughout the year ranging from 11-29 °C, with an average rainfall of 3,000 cm. It overlooks the major river Chhimtuipui flowing towards Burma. The edges of the mountains are all very steep and mostly of sharp precipices, and the most spectacular is a semi-circular beautiful cliff on the western side called Thlazuang Khâm, which has a blunt and deep fall. The mountain ridge runs in a north-south direction covering about 10 km. The closest human settlement is Thaltlang village at the base and periphery of the park.

== Flora and fauna ==
The Phawngpui National Park provides habitat for a range of birds including the rare Blyth's tragopan, falcon, sunbirds, dark-rumped swift, and Mrs. Hume's pheasant, which is the Mizoram state bird, and also rare animals like the mountain goat, slow loris, tiger, leopard, leopard cat, serow, goral, Asiatic black bear, stump-tailed macaque and capped langur. In 2000, rare bird species were recorded such as mountain bamboo partridge, oriental pied hornbill, purple cochoa, striped laughingthrush, grey sibia, black eagle and large-billed crow. The clouded leopard (Neofelis nebulosa) was spotted and documented for the first time in 1997. The landscape is the natural habitat of various grasses (in fact is the origin of the name, phawng in Lai dialect means "meadow", and -pui is the suffix for "great"). The steep slopes are covered by orchids and rhododendrons, with areas of bamboos.

== Tourism ==
The Government of Mizoram allows ecofriendly visit to the national park only during the dry season, i.e. permit is open for 6 months from November to the end of April. The rest of the season is left for natural development and rejuvenation. During the last opening season, there were 569 visitors including 52 foreigners.

== See also ==
- Phawngpui
