= Phawngpui =

Mountain peak in Mizoram, India

- Phunpi Klang
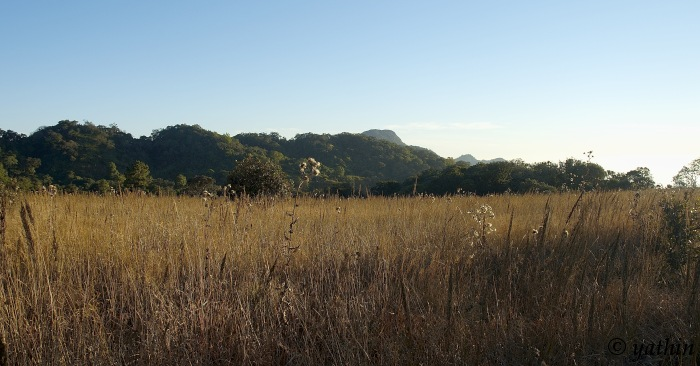
- Phawngpui Farpak

Highest point
- Elevation: 2,157 m (7,077 ft)
- Listing: List of Indian states and territories by highest point
- Coordinates: 22°37′53.4″N 93°02′19.68″E

Geography
- Location within Mizoram Location within India
- Location: near the Myanmar border in Lawngtlai District
- Parent range: Mizoram, India
- Topo map: "NF 46-7, Gangaw, Burma"

Phawngpui (Pron: /ˌpʰɔ:ŋˈpʊɪ/), also known as Blue Mountain, is the highest mountain peak in the Mizo Hills (Lushai Hills) and in the state of Mizoram, India, with an elevation of 2157 m. It is in Lawngtlai district, in the southeastern region of Mizoram near the Myanmar border.

== Geography ==
Phawngpui is the highest peak of the Lushai Hills. There is a semicircular series of cliffs on the western side called Thlazuang Khàm, which have a sharp and deep fall; mountain goats live there. These cliffs are believed to be haunted by spirits. On the peak, there is a level ground of about 2 km^{2} in area.

== Etymology and origin ==
A highly revered peak, considered to be the abode of local deities, Phawngpui was a major centre of folk religion and location for folklore stories. The name is derived from the Lai language, phong, meaning "grassland" or "meadow", and the suffix -pui meaning, "great". This was because the mountain was mostly covered with all types of meadows, hence appropriately the "great meadow". The mountain was, according to the belief of the natives, the abode of several spiritual races. The most important folktale, perhaps, is that of a deity king named "Sangau"; the actual town at the base of the mountain has become Sangau. Sangau had a son who married the princess of another royal family called Cherian. At the wedding was an exchange of gifts, a couple of hoolock gibbons from Sangau and a pine tree from Cherian. The base area, the main entrance of the mountain bears that name Farpak (meaning "pine only").

== Conservation ==
Since 1992 the mountain has been included in the protected area of the Phawngpui National Park, one of only two national parks of India in Mizoram. The Government of Mizoram allows ecofriendly visit to the mountain only during November to April.

== Flora and fauna ==
The area is encircled by matted bamboo groves and other alluring vegetations. There are varieties of butterflies, including some rare species found in this region. The Farpak area in Phawngpui is a huge grassland adjacent to a cliff area where one can sight birds like peregrine falcon, Blyth's tragopan, sunbirds, grey sibia, golden-throated barbet, Mrs. Hume's pheasant, hornbill, dark-rumped swift, mountain bamboo partridge, black eagle and other birds. The very rare clouded leopard has been recorded in the Farpak area since 1997. There have been instances of wild orchids being stolen from Phawngpui, efforts are being taken to protect and conserve it.

== See also ==
- List of mountains in India
- Phawngpui National Park

== Gallery ==
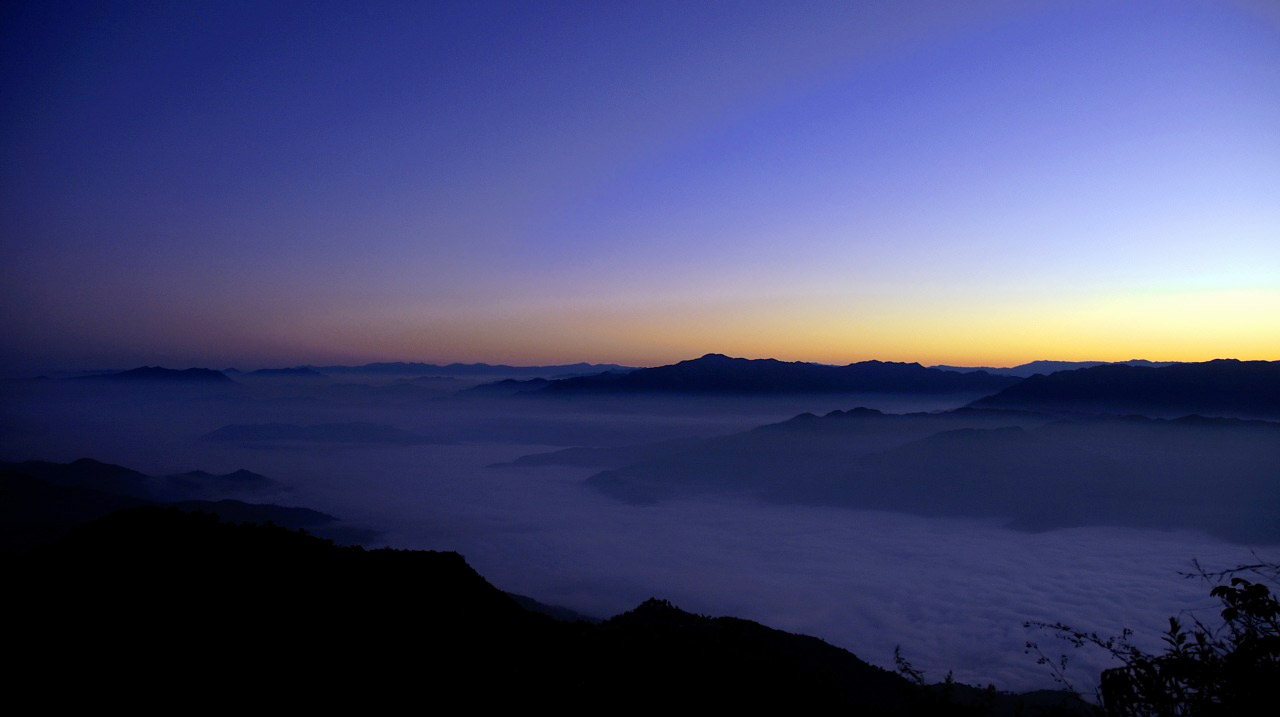
Park at sunrise

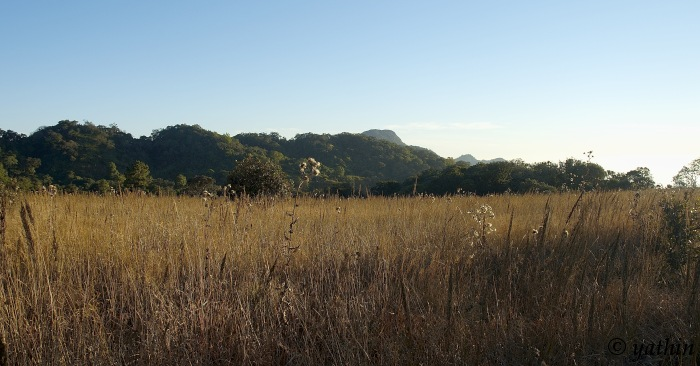
Farpak grassland
