= Selam =

Selam may refer to:

- Selam, Champhai, a village in Mizoram, India
- Selam (Australopithecus), a hominin fossil
- Selam, the moon of asteroid 152830 Dinkinesh
- An alternative spelling of "salaam", a short form of the greeting As-salamu alaykum
- Selam (film), a 2013 Turkish drama film
- Selam Musai (1857–1920), Albanian military leader
- Selam Tesfaye (born 1992), Ethiopian film actress
- Selam, a municipality in Ethiopia

== See also ==
- Hagere Selam (Degua Tembien), a town in Ethiopia
- Salaam (disambiguation)
- Salem (disambiguation)
