= Murlen National Park =

Indian national park

- IUCN category II (national park)
- Location within Mizoram Location within India
- Interactive map of Murlen National Park
- Location: near the Myanmar border in Champhai District, India
- Coordinates: 23°37′01″N 93°18′00″E
- Area: 200 km^{2} (77 sq mi)
- Established: 1991; 35 years ago

Murlen National Park is a national park located in the Champhai district Mizoram in India. The size of the park area is 200 km^{2} (77 sq mi). The park is situated about 245 km east of Aizawl, and is close to the Chin Hills. It lies north of Lengteng Wildlife Sanctuary in the same district. It covers an area of approximately 100 km^{2}. The tropical, semi-evergreen and sub montane Forests of Murlen are home to a rich variety of flora and fauna. About 15 species of mammals, 150 species of birds, 35 species of Medicinal plants, 2 species of bamboos, and 4 species of orchids so far have been recorded in this Park. In 2012, 36 people were involved in conservation work of Murlen National Park.

== History ==
Murlen National Park is at Murlen Village, which is the Village of Saithuama Sailo, Chief of Hnahlan. It is a part of Hnahlan Village. Murlen National Park was declared in 1991.

== Flora ==
Only about 1% of the sun's rays can penetrate the forest on a sunny day. So the thickness of the forest in the park is generally compared to the forest found in the Amazon region in South America. Some of the trees found in the park are as old as 350 years. There is an area in the park where not even a single sun's ray can penetrate. And for this reason the area has been known as ‘losing area of seven fellow-men’ or land of no return. The vegetation is admixture of Quercus, Schima wallichii, Betula, Michelia champaca, Pinus kesiya, Prunus, Myrica, Rhododendron, Chimonobambusa callosa, canes and a variety of orchids and lichens. Two species of Ceropegia belonging to the Asclepiadaceae plant family have been discovered in Murlen National Park, These two species of plants have been named as Ceropegia mizoramensis and Ceropegia murlensis which are derived from the state and the locality of Park.

== Fauna ==
Fauna found here include the tiger, leopard, sambar, barking deer, Malayan giant squirrel, Himalayan black bear, serow, hoolock gibbon, rhesus macaque, Hume's pheasant, kalij pheasant, grey partridge, hill myna, and dark-rumped swift. Cases of Hunting and poaching have been reported in Murlen National Park. Many efforts have been taken up by the state government to prevent it.
