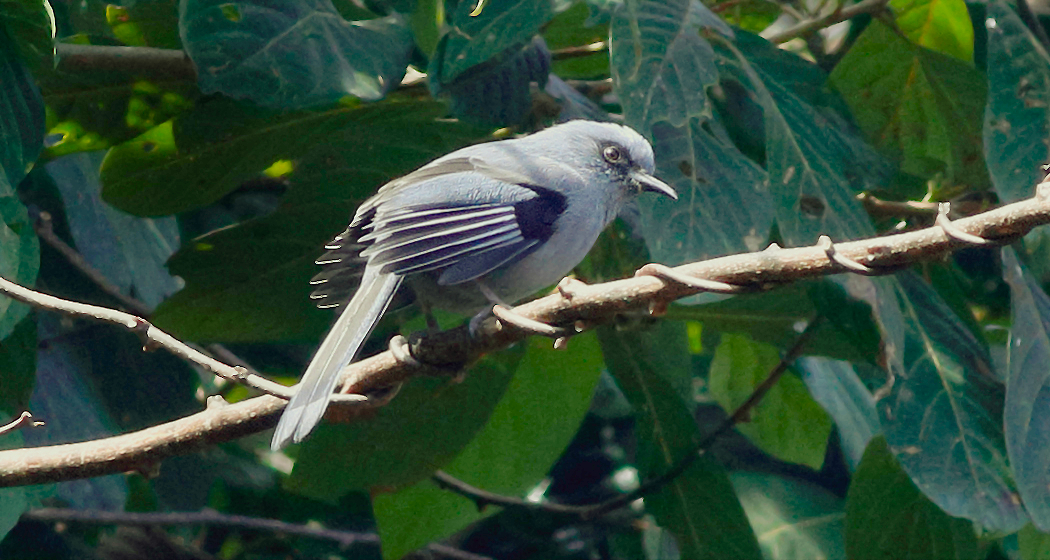
- At Khonoma Nature Conservation and Tragopan Sanctuary, Nagaland, India

Conservation status
- Least Concern (IUCN 3.1)

Scientific classification
- Kingdom: Animalia
- Phylum: Chordata
- Class: Aves
- Order: Passeriformes
- Family: Leiothrichidae
- Genus: Heterophasia
- Species: H. pulchella

Binomial name
- Heterophasia pulchella (Godwin-Austen, 1874)

= Beautiful sibia =

Species of bird

The beautiful sibia (Heterophasia pulchella) is a species of bird in the family Leiothrichidae. It is found in China, India, and Myanmar.

Its natural habitat is subtropical or tropical moist montane forest.
