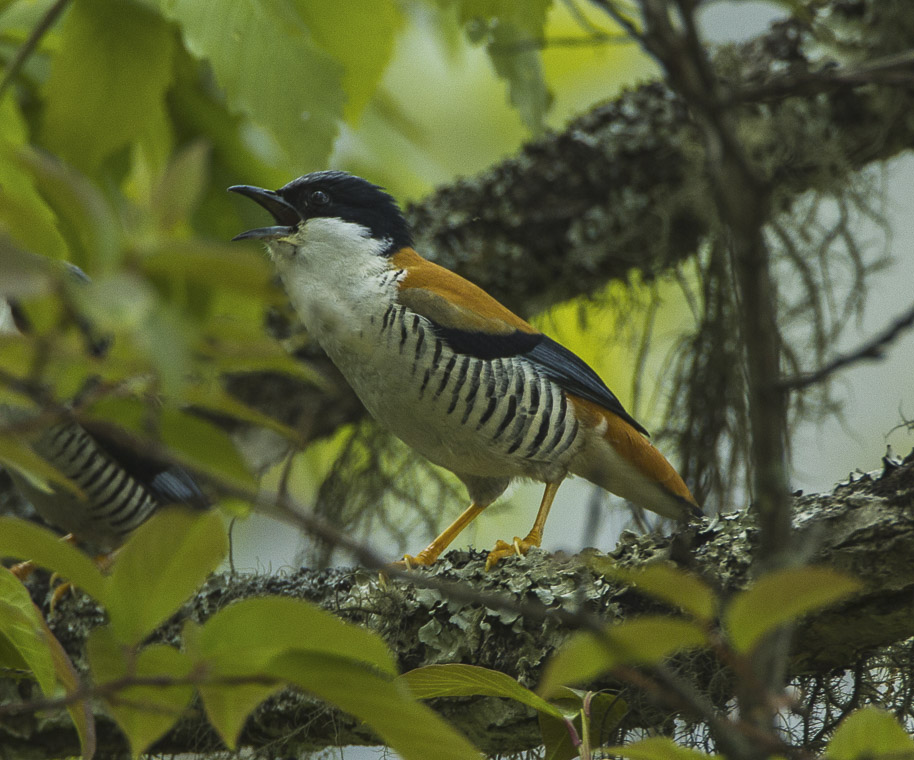
- Himalayan cutia (Cutia nipalensis)

Scientific classification
- Kingdom: Animalia
- Phylum: Chordata
- Class: Aves
- Order: Passeriformes
- Family: Leiothrichidae
- Genus: Cutia; Hodgson, 1837

Type species
- Cutia nipalensis Hodgson, 1837

Species
- See text

= Cutia =

Genus of birds

The agoutis of the genus Dasyprocta are locally known as "cutias". See also Hutia, where the name for these rodents originated.

The cutias are the passerine bird genus Cutia in the family Leiothrichidae. These birds are found in montane forests of continental South and Southeast Asia. The name is derived from the Nepali name khatya or khutya for the type species, the Himalayan cutia (C. nipalensis). The cutias are related to the alcippes and the laughingthrushes.

== Species ==
For a long time the genus was held to be monotypic, containing only a single species C. nipalensis. This has more recently been split in two:

Image	Scientific name	Common name	Distribution
	Cutia nipalensis	Himalayan cutia	Himalayan region, from India to northern Thailand.
	Cutia legalleni	Vietnamese cutia	Laos and Vietnam.
