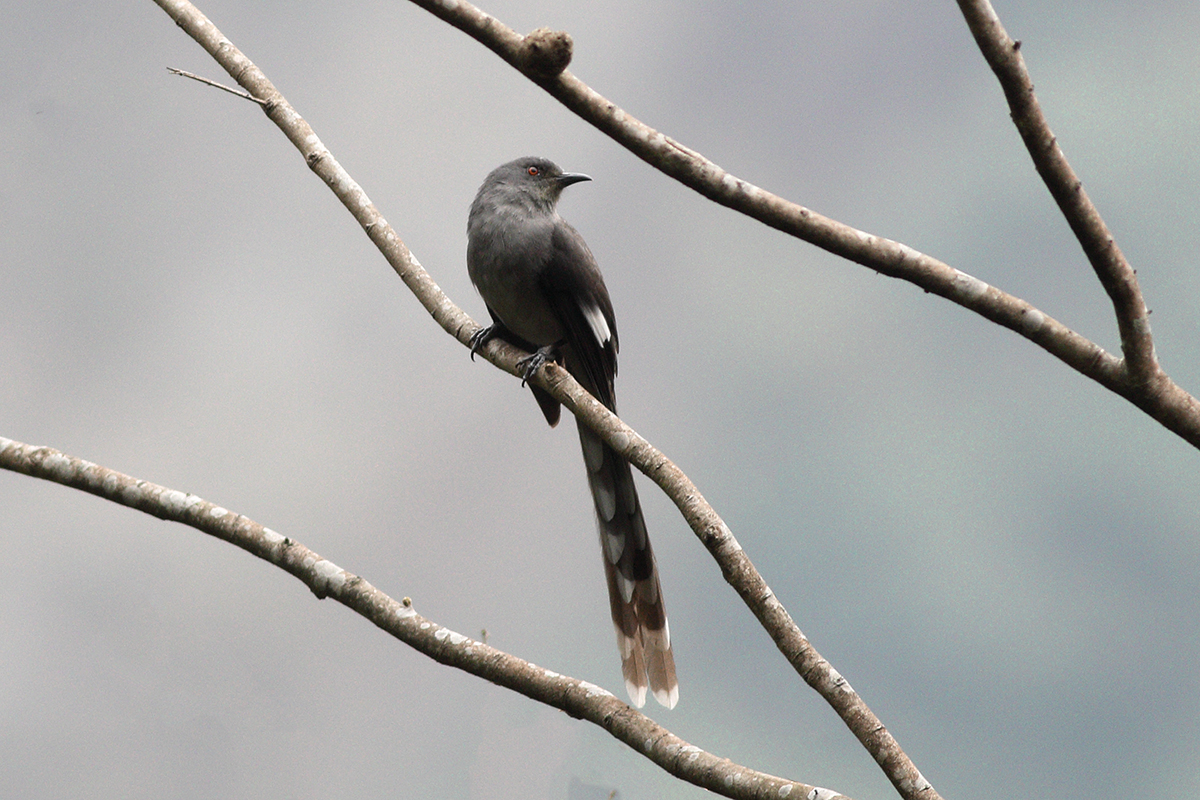
- From Eaglenest Wildlife Sanctuary, Arunachal Pradesh, India

Conservation status
- Least Concern (IUCN 3.1)

Scientific classification
- Kingdom: Animalia
- Phylum: Chordata
- Class: Aves
- Order: Passeriformes
- Family: Leiothrichidae
- Genus: Heterophasia
- Species: H. picaoides

Binomial name
- Heterophasia picaoides (Hodgson, 1839)

Synonyms
- Leioptila picaoides

= Long-tailed sibia =

Species of bird

The long-tailed sibia (Heterophasia picaoides) is a species of Leiothrichidae from Southeast Asia. The species was once placed in the large family Timaliidae, but that family is sometimes split with this species being placed with the laughingthrushes in the family Leiothrichidae. The species is sometimes treated as the only species in the genus Heterophasia, with the other species being placed in the genus Malacias.

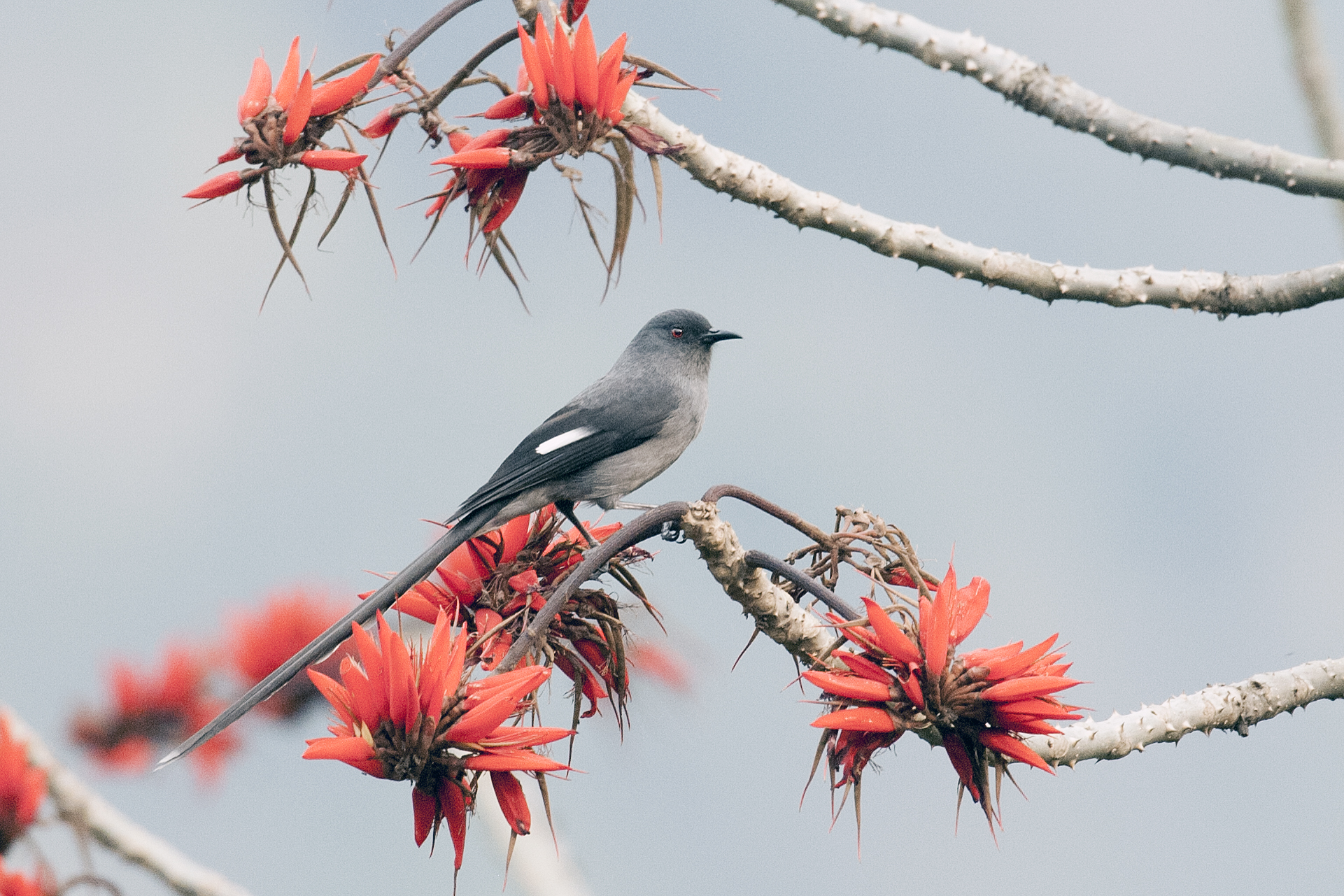
From Arunachal Pradesh, India.

== Distribution and habitat ==
The long-tailed sibia is found from the Himalayas through South East Asia and Sumatra. It is found in evergreen forest, oak and pine forests, secondary growth, scrub with large trees and forest edge habitats.
