= Black-headed sibia =

- In Doi Inthanon NP, Chiang Mai, Thailand

Conservation status
- Least Concern (IUCN 3.1)

Scientific classification
- Kingdom: Animalia
- Phylum: Chordata
- Class: Aves
- Order: Passeriformes
- Family: Leiothrichidae
- Genus: Heterophasia
- Species: H. desgodinsi

Binomial name
- Heterophasia desgodinsi (Oustalet, 1877)

Synonyms
- Malacias desgodinsi

Species of bird

The black-headed sibia (Heterophasia desgodinsi) is a bird species in the family Leiothrichidae. In former times it was often included with the dark-backed sibia in H. melanoleuca. Together with most other sibias, it is sometimes separated in the genus Malacias.

It is found in China, Laos and Vietnam. Its natural habitat is subtropical or tropical moist montane forests.
