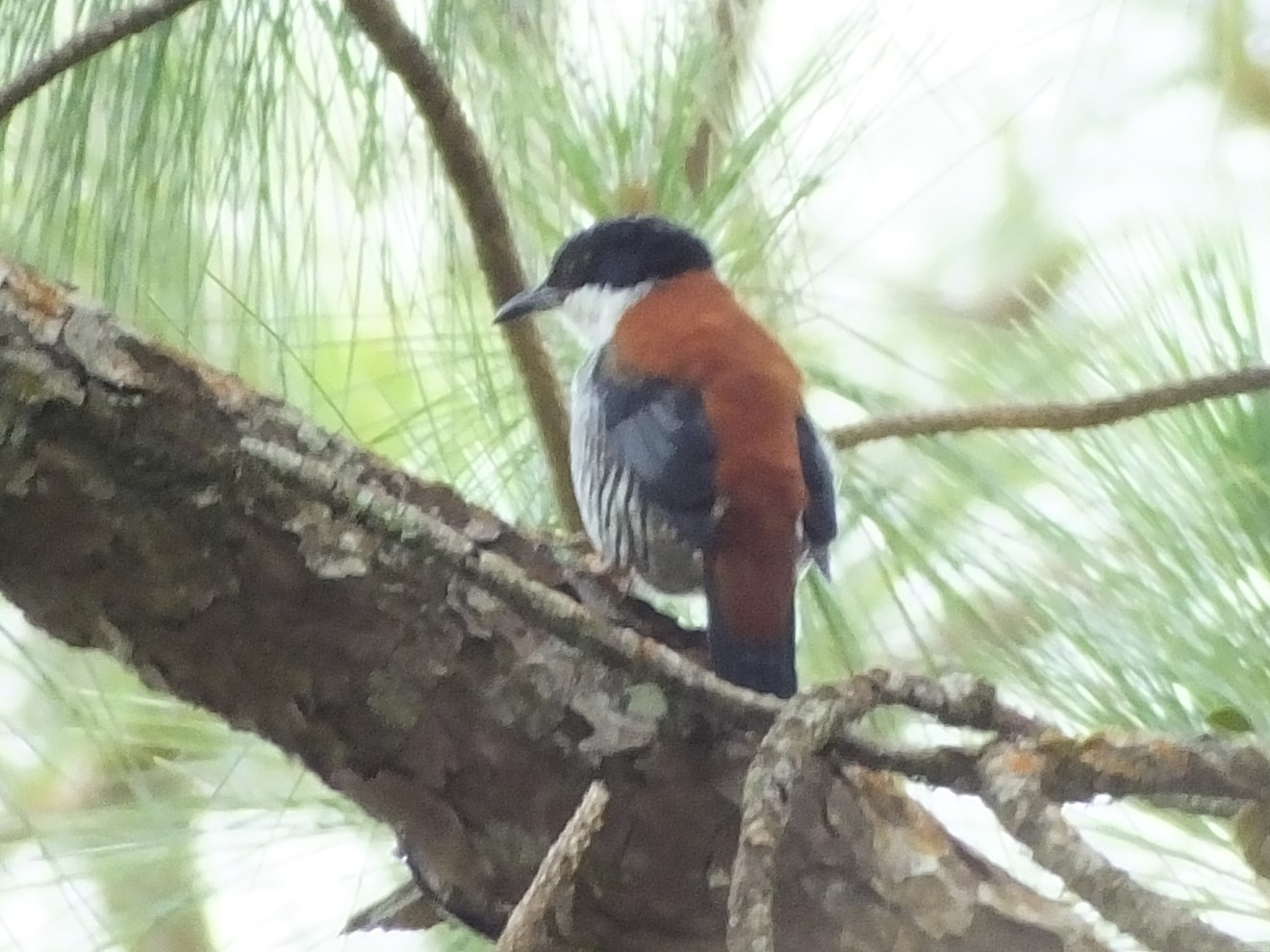
- Cutia legalleni (Vietnamese cutia)

Conservation status
- Near Threatened (IUCN 3.1)

Scientific classification
- Kingdom: Animalia
- Phylum: Chordata
- Class: Aves
- Order: Passeriformes
- Family: Leiothrichidae
- Genus: Cutia
- Species: C. legalleni

Binomial name
- Cutia legalleni Robinson & Kloss, 1919

Synonyms
- Cutia nipalensis legalleni

= Vietnamese cutia =

Species of bird

The Vietnamese cutia (Cutia legalleni) is a bird species in the family Leiothrichidae. It is found in Laos and Vietnam.

It was long considered a subspecies of the Himalayan cutia (C. nipalensis), making the genus Cutia monotypic. In recent times, it is more often elevated to full species status.

Its natural habitat is tropical moist montane forests. The Vietnamese Cutia is not considered threatened by the IUCN, but as its range is far more restricted than that of its western relative, it is classified as a Near Threatened species after the split.
