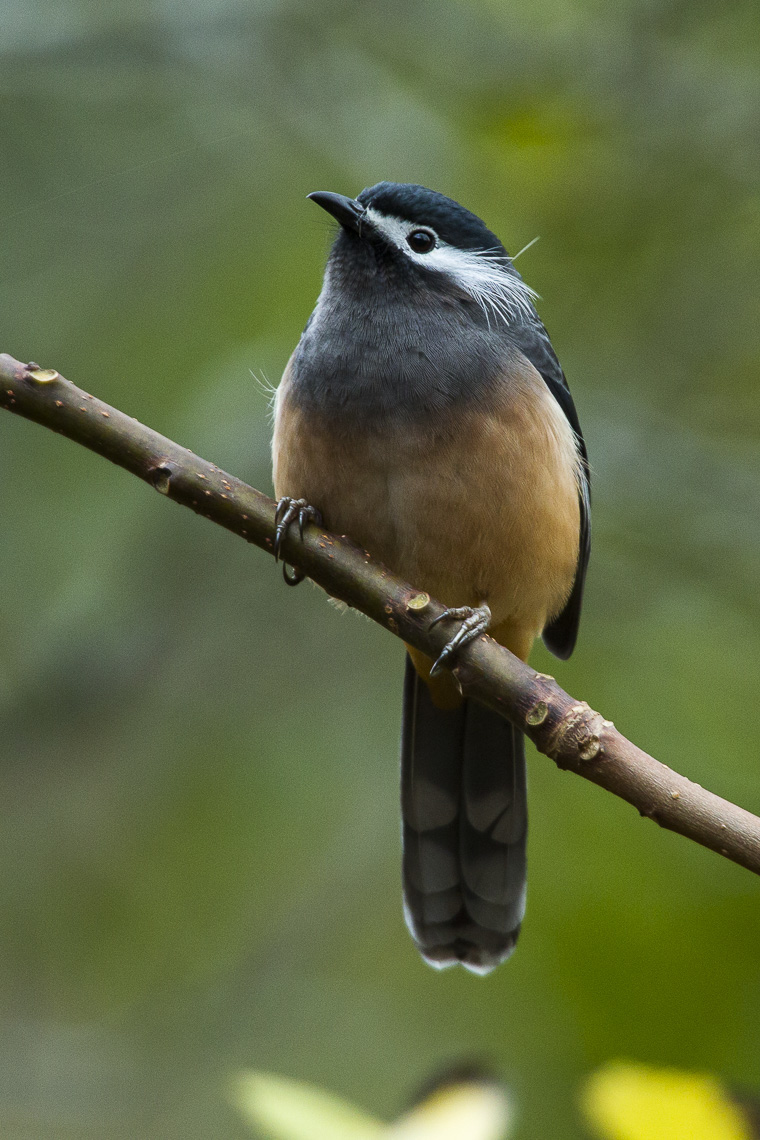

Conservation status
- Least Concern (IUCN 3.1)

Scientific classification
- Kingdom: Animalia
- Phylum: Chordata
- Class: Aves
- Order: Passeriformes
- Family: Leiothrichidae
- Genus: Heterophasia
- Species: H. auricularis

Binomial name
- Heterophasia auricularis (R. Swinhoe, 1864)

Synonyms
- Malacias auricularis; Kittacincla auricularis

= White-eared sibia =

Species of bird

The white-eared sibia (Heterophasia auricularis) is a bird in the laughingthrush family Leiothrichidae. The species is sometimes placed in the monotypic genus Malacias. It was first described by Robert Swinhoe in 1864. There are no subspecies.

== Distribution ==
It is endemic to the island of Taiwan, where it occupies a range of forest and woodland habitats. The species is a partial altitudinal migrant, breeding at 1,200–3,000 m (3,900–9,800 ft) above sea-level during the summer (or 2,780 m (9,120 ft) in the north of Taiwan), but with some individuals descending down to 700 m (2,300 ft) in winter, sometimes as low as 200 m (660 ft) in a particularly harsh spell. In the summer it inhabits evergreen forests, including mixed broadleaf coniferous forests, but will use deciduous forests in the winter.

== Description ==
The white-eared sibia is an elegant, long-tailed babbler, 22 to 24 cm (8.7–9.4 in) long and weighing an average of 40–50 g (1.4–1.8 oz). The head is black with a conspicuous white stripe through the eye, and the stripe ends in long white filamentous plumes. The wings and tail are deep blue-black, with a noticeable white wingbar. The upper back and breast is dark grey, and the belly and rump are deep rufous chestnut. The bill is black and the legs brown-flesh coloured. Both the sexes are alike, and the plumage of juvenile birds hasn't been described.

== Behaviour ==
The white-eared sibia is an active feeder, taking a wide range of prey and food items. It feeds on insects taken from flowers, and will also take nectar, acorns, berries, fruit and seeds. The white-eared sibia has a brushy tongue adapted to taking nectar, but is not wholly dependent on that food source. It will join flocks of Taiwan yuhina in flowering trees to take advantage of it when the chance arises. It will also take eggs and nestlings, such as those of the Taiwan yuhina. It feeds from the canopy of trees to the forest floor, but more commonly feeds higher up, either individually, in pairs or in small flocks. Very little is known about its breeding behaviour; while the species is not shy, all that is known is that it nests in the canopy of tall trees.
