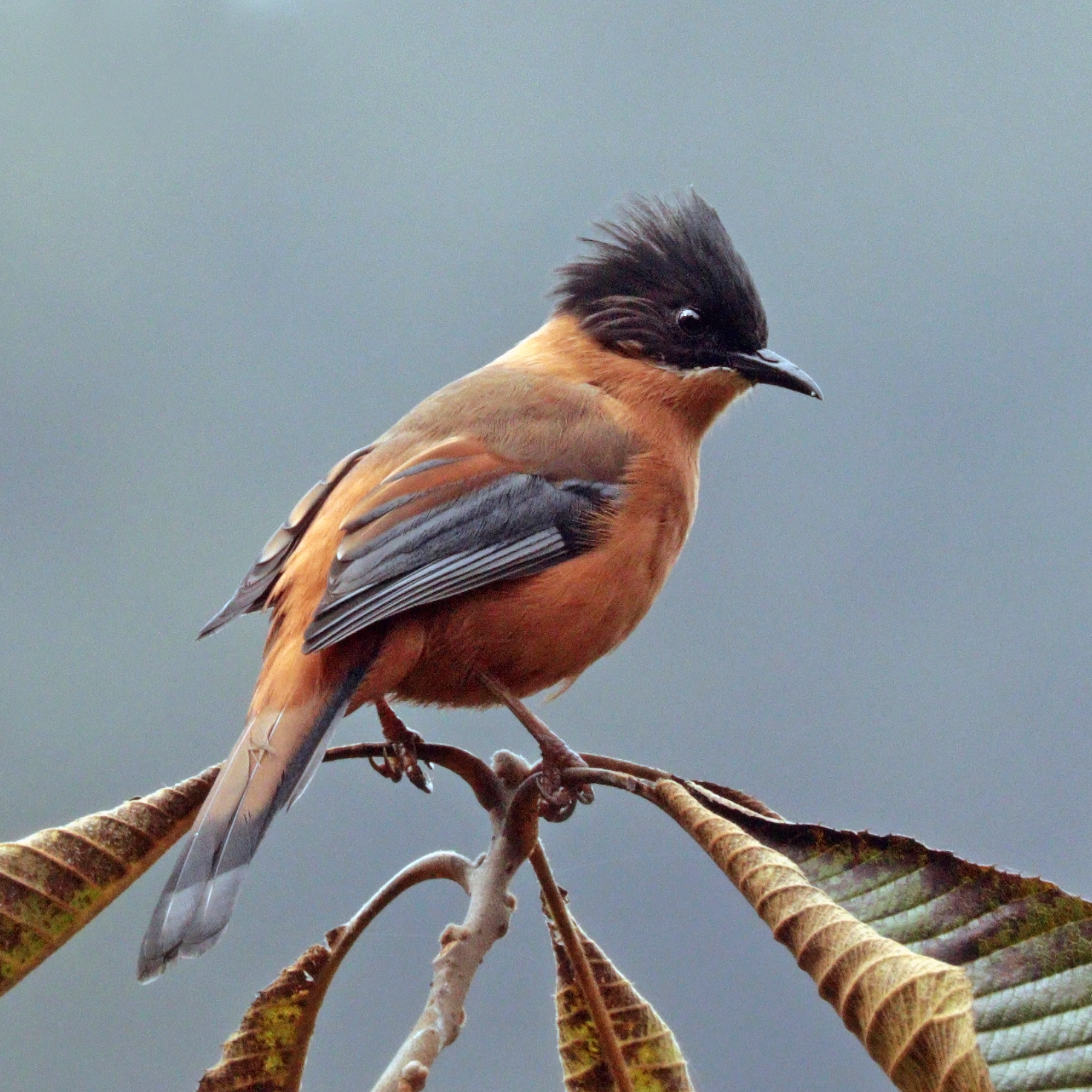
- Rufous sibia (H. capistrata nigriceps)

Scientific classification
- Kingdom: Animalia
- Phylum: Chordata
- Class: Aves
- Order: Passeriformes
- Family: Leiothrichidae
- Genus: Heterophasia; Blyth, 1842

Type species
- Heterophasia cuculopsis Blyth, 1842=Sibia picaoides Hodgson, 1839

Species
- See text

= Heterophasia =

Genus of birds

Heterophasia, the sibias, is a genus of passerine birds in the laughingthrush family Leiothrichidae. They are found from the Himalayas to southern China and Sumatra.

== Taxonomy ==
The genus Heterophasia was introduced in 1842 by the English zoologist Edward Blyth to accommodate a single species, Heterophasia cuculopsis Blyth, 1842. This is the type species by monotypy. The species is a junior synonym of Sibia picaoides, the long-tailed sibia, that had been described by Brian Houghton Hodgson in 1839. The name Heterophasia combines the Ancient Greek ἑτερος/heteros meaning "different" with φασις/phasis meaning "appearance".

== Species ==
The genus contains seven species:

Image	Common name	Scientific name	Distribution
	Long-tailed sibia	Heterophasia picaoides	Himalayas to Sumatra
	White-eared sibia	Heterophasia auricularis	montane oak forest of Taiwan
	Rufous sibia	Heterophasia capistrata	Himalayas
	Beautiful sibia	Heterophasia pulchella	northeast India to southeast Tibet, north Myanmar and central south China
	Grey sibia	Heterophasia gracilis	montane forest of northeastern India, Myanmar, and southern China (western Yunnan)
	Dark-backed sibia	Heterophasia melanoleuca	Mainland Southeast Asia
	Black-headed sibia	Heterophasia desgodinsi	south China and north Vietnam
