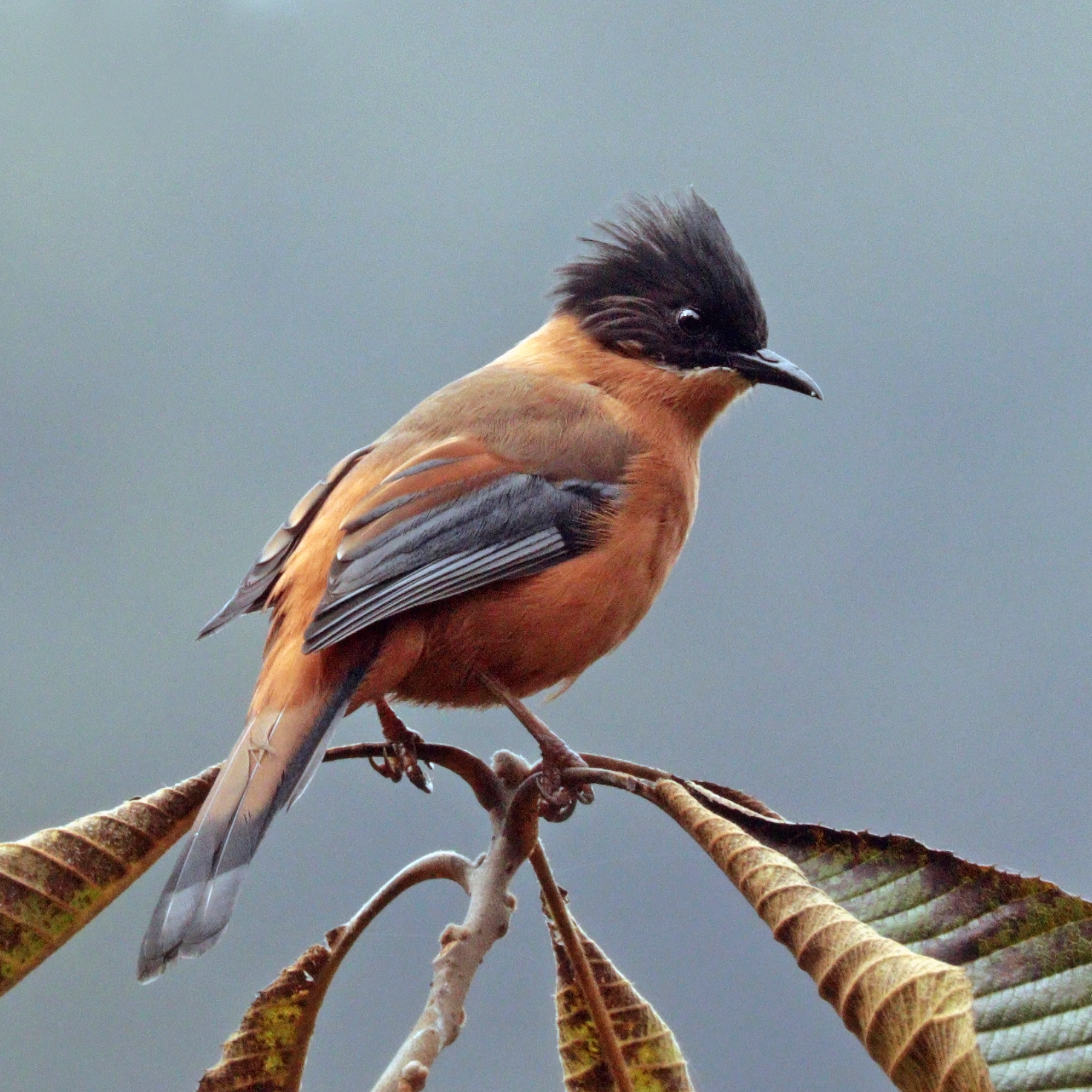
- R. s. nigriceps Mount Phulchowki, Nepal
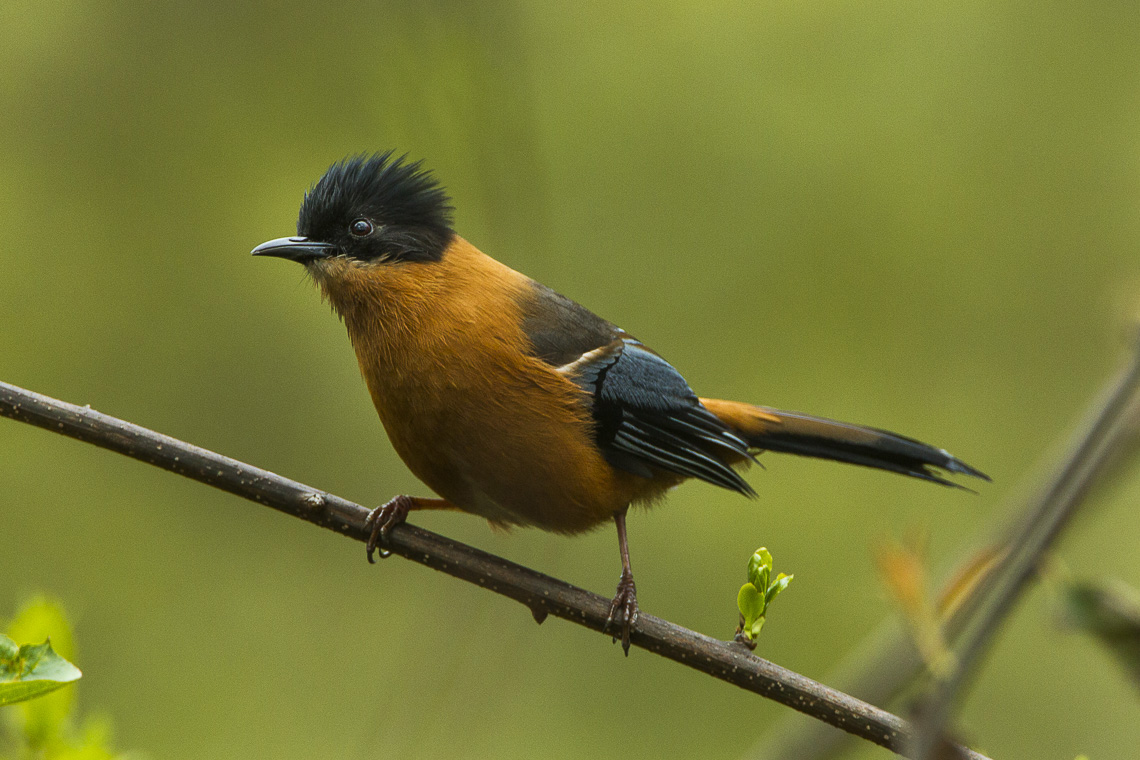
- R. s. bayleyi Bhutan

Conservation status
- Least Concern (IUCN 3.1)

Scientific classification
- Kingdom: Animalia
- Phylum: Chordata
- Class: Aves
- Order: Passeriformes
- Family: Leiothrichidae
- Genus: Heterophasia
- Species: H. capistrata

Binomial name
- Heterophasia capistrata (Vigors, 1831)

Synonyms
- Malacias capistrata

= Rufous sibia =

Species of bird

The rufous sibia (Heterophasia capistrata) is a species of bird in the family Leiothrichidae. It feeds on berries and insects.

It is found in the northern parts of the Indian subcontinent, ranging across India, Nepal and Bhutan. Its natural habitat is the temperate forests of the Lower to Middle Himalayas. The species has an unmistakable appearance with its rufous-dominated colouration and black head, and is often seen with its crest raised. It is a vigorous, melodious singer.

== Gallery ==
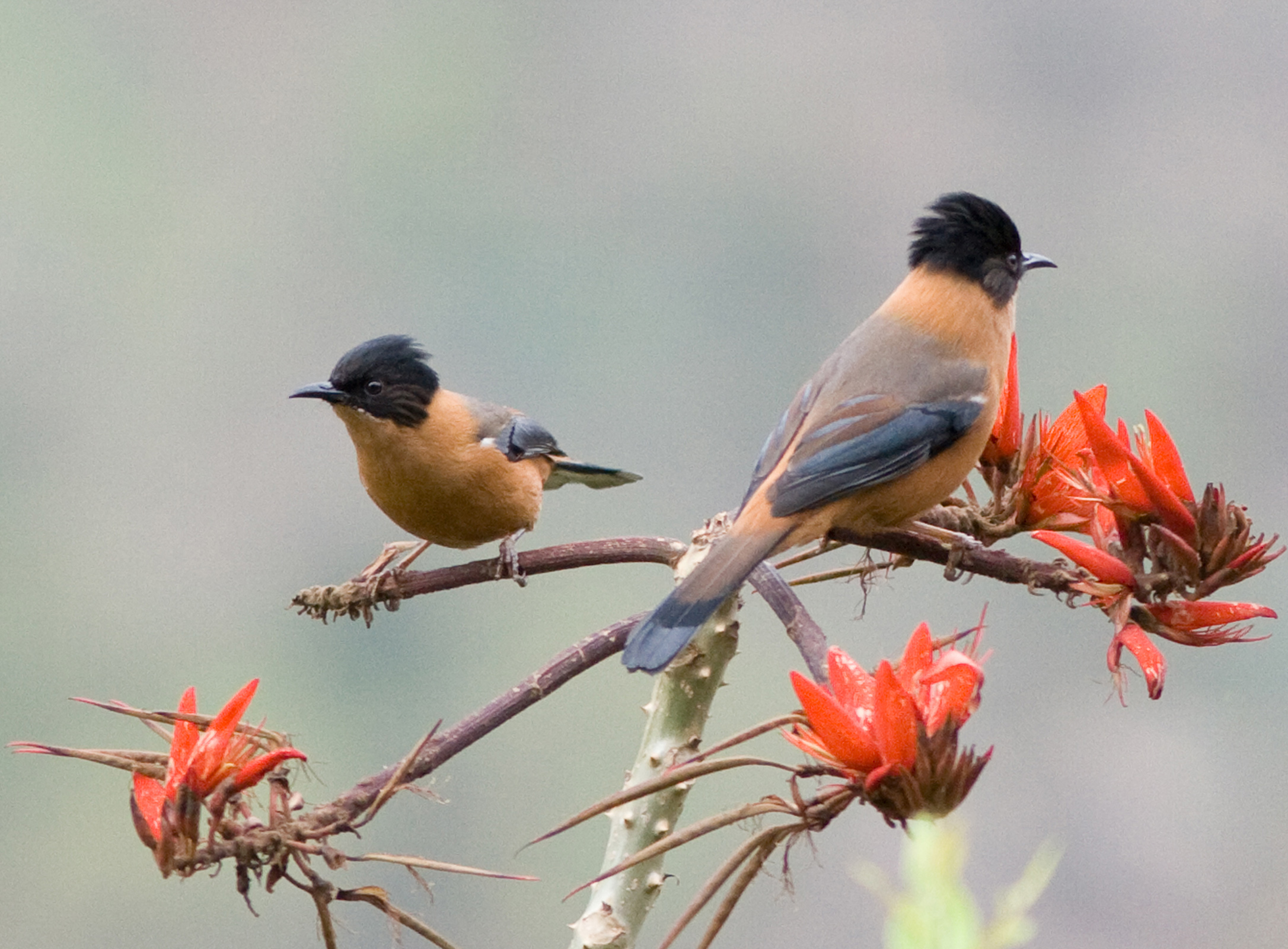
Sikkim, India

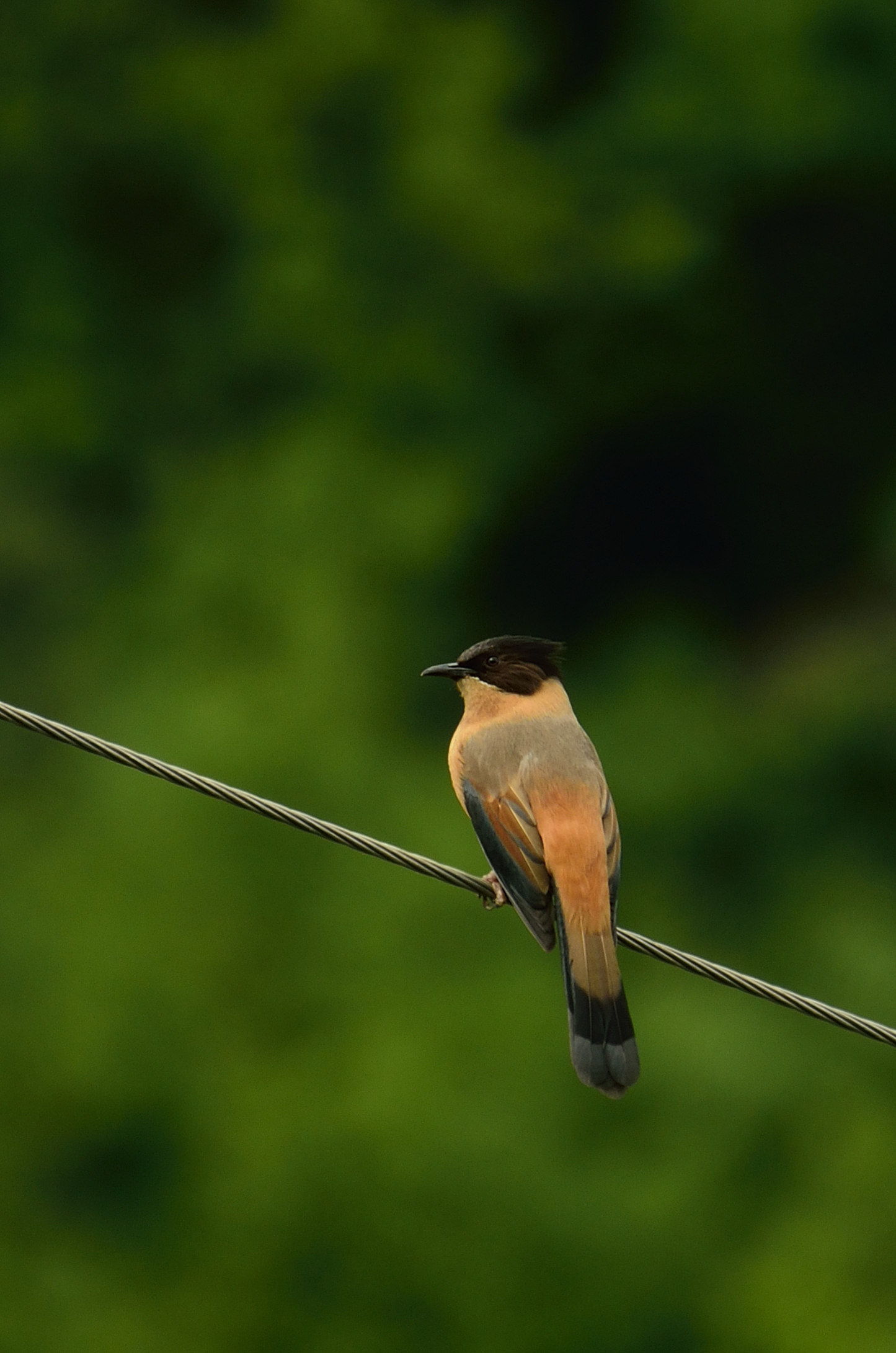
R. s. capistrata
Galu temple in Himachal

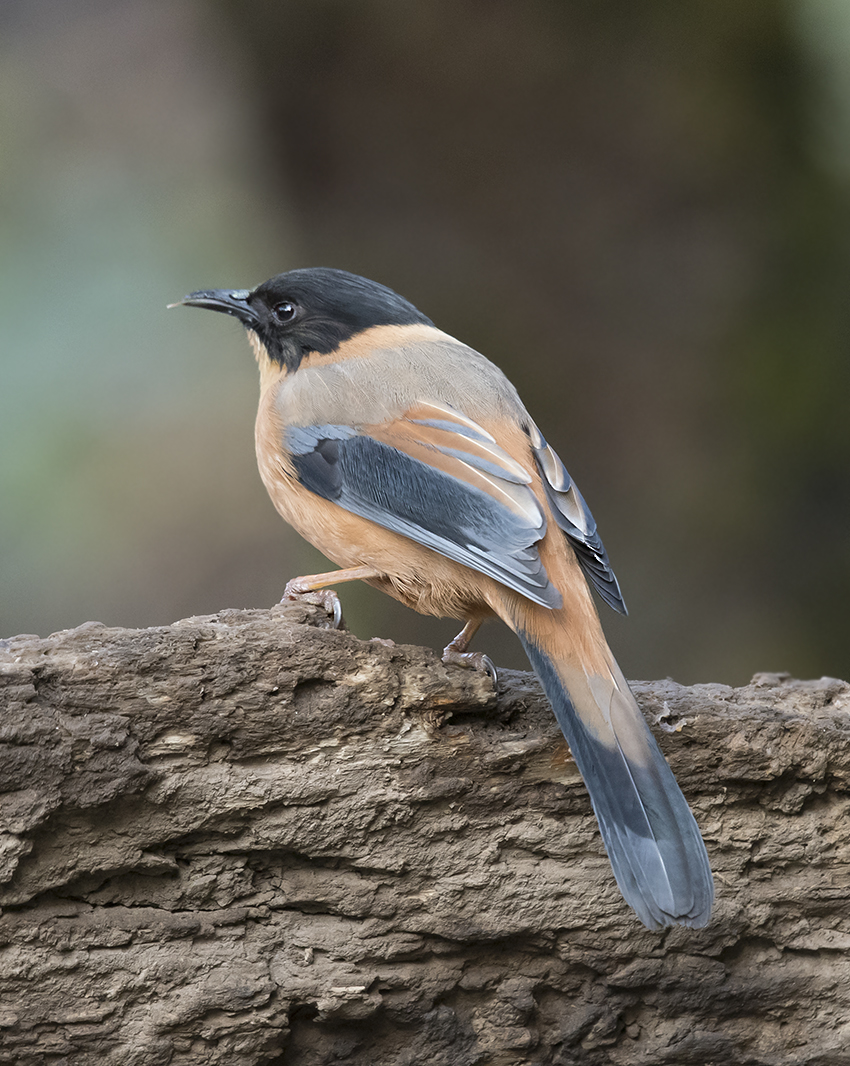
Faridabad, Haryana, India

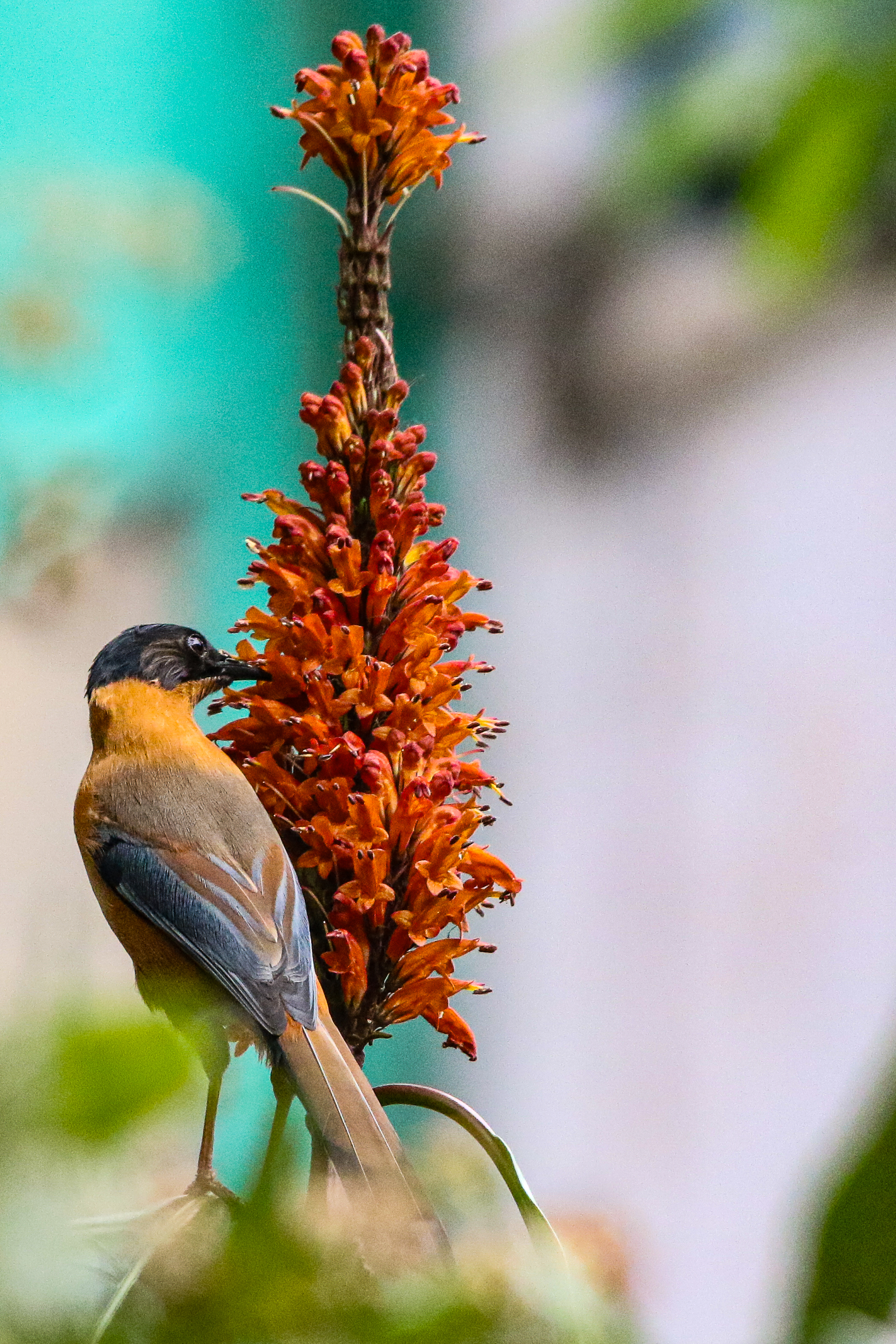
Rufous sibia (Heterophasia capistrata), Latpanchar, West Bengal, India

Call of rufous sibia
