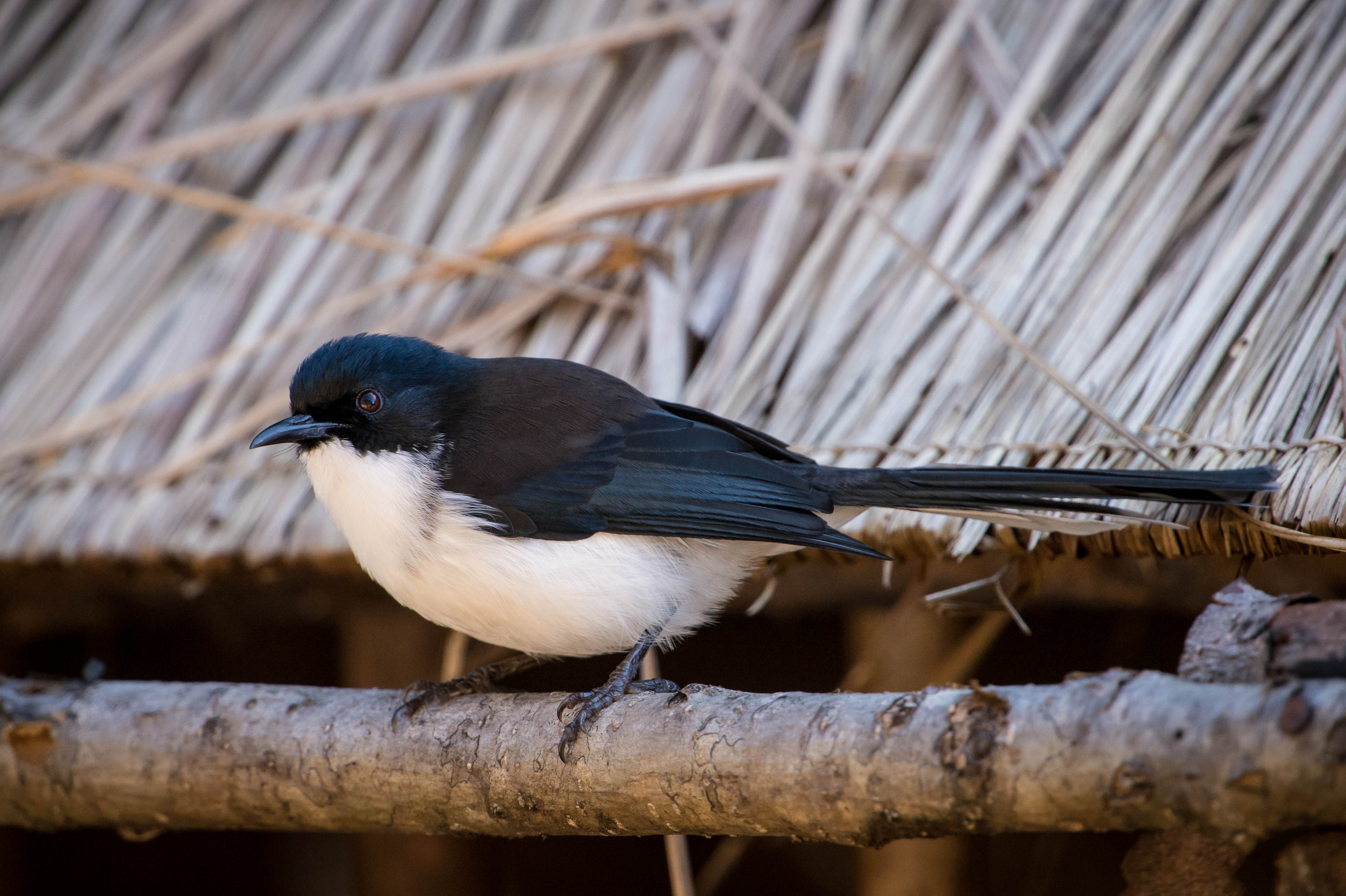

Conservation status
- Least Concern (IUCN 3.1)

Scientific classification
- Kingdom: Animalia
- Phylum: Chordata
- Class: Aves
- Order: Passeriformes
- Family: Leiothrichidae
- Genus: Heterophasia
- Species: H. melanoleuca

Binomial name
- Heterophasia melanoleuca (Blyth, 1859)

= Dark-backed sibia =

Species of bird

The dark-backed sibia (Heterophasia melanoleuca) is a bird species in the family Leiothrichidae. In former times it was included the black-headed sibia, H. desgodinsi. Together with most other sibias, it is sometimes separated in the genus Malacias. It is found in China, Myanmar and Thailand. Its natural habitat is subtropical or tropical moist montane forests.
