= Murlen =

- village
- Location in Mizoram, India Murlen (India)
- Coordinates: 23.6609612°N 93.2841427°E
- Country: India
- State: Mizoram
- District: Champhai
- Block: Champhai
- Elevation: 1,358 m (4,455 ft)

Population (2011)
  - Total: 510
- Time zone: UTC+5:30 (IST)
- 2011 census code: 271340

Murlen is a village in the Champhai district of Mizoram, India. It is located in the Champhai R.D. Block.

== Demographics ==
According to the 2011 census of India, Murlen has 86 households. The effective literacy rate (i.e. the literacy rate of population excluding children aged 6 and below) is 98.26%.

Demographics (2011 Census)
	Total	Male	Female
Population	510	271	239
Children aged below 6 years	107	58	49
Scheduled caste	0	0	0
Scheduled tribe	509	270	239
Literates	396	208	188
Workers (all)	274	144	130
Main workers (total)	274	144	130
Main workers: Cultivators	261	134	127
Main workers: Agricultural labourers	0	0	0
Main workers: Household industry workers	1	1	0
Main workers: Other	12	9	3
Marginal workers (total)	0	0	0
Marginal workers: Cultivators	0	0	0
Marginal workers: Agricultural labourers	0	0	0
Marginal workers: Household industry workers	0	0	0
Marginal workers: Others	0	0	0
Non-workers	236	127	109
