= Lamzawl =

- village
- Location in Mizoram, India Lamzawl (India)
- Coordinates: 23.8171183°N 93.2062153°E
- Country: India
- State: Mizoram
- District: Champhai
- Block: Ngopa
- Elevation: 1,059 m (3,474 ft)

Population (2011)
  - Total: 350
- Time zone: UTC+5:30 (IST)
- 2011 census code: 271299

Lamzawl is a village in the Saitual District of Mizoram, India. It is located in the Ngopa R.D. Block.

== Demographics ==
According to the 2011 census of India, Lamzawl has 80 households. The effective literacy rate (i.e. the literacy rate of population excluding children aged 6 and below) is 95.89%.

Demographics (2011 Census)
	Total	Male	Female
Population	350	183	167
Children aged below 6 years	58	33	25
Scheduled caste	0	0	0
Scheduled tribe	339	181	158
Literates	280	143	137
Workers (all)	229	114	115
Main workers (total)	223	112	111
Main workers: Cultivators	203	104	99
Main workers: Agricultural labourers	0	0	0
Main workers: Household industry workers	2	0	2
Main workers: Other	18	8	10
Marginal workers (total)	6	2	4
Marginal workers: Cultivators	4	1	3
Marginal workers: Agricultural labourers	0	0	0
Marginal workers: Household industry workers	0	0	0
Marginal workers: Others	2	1	1
Non-workers	121	69	52
