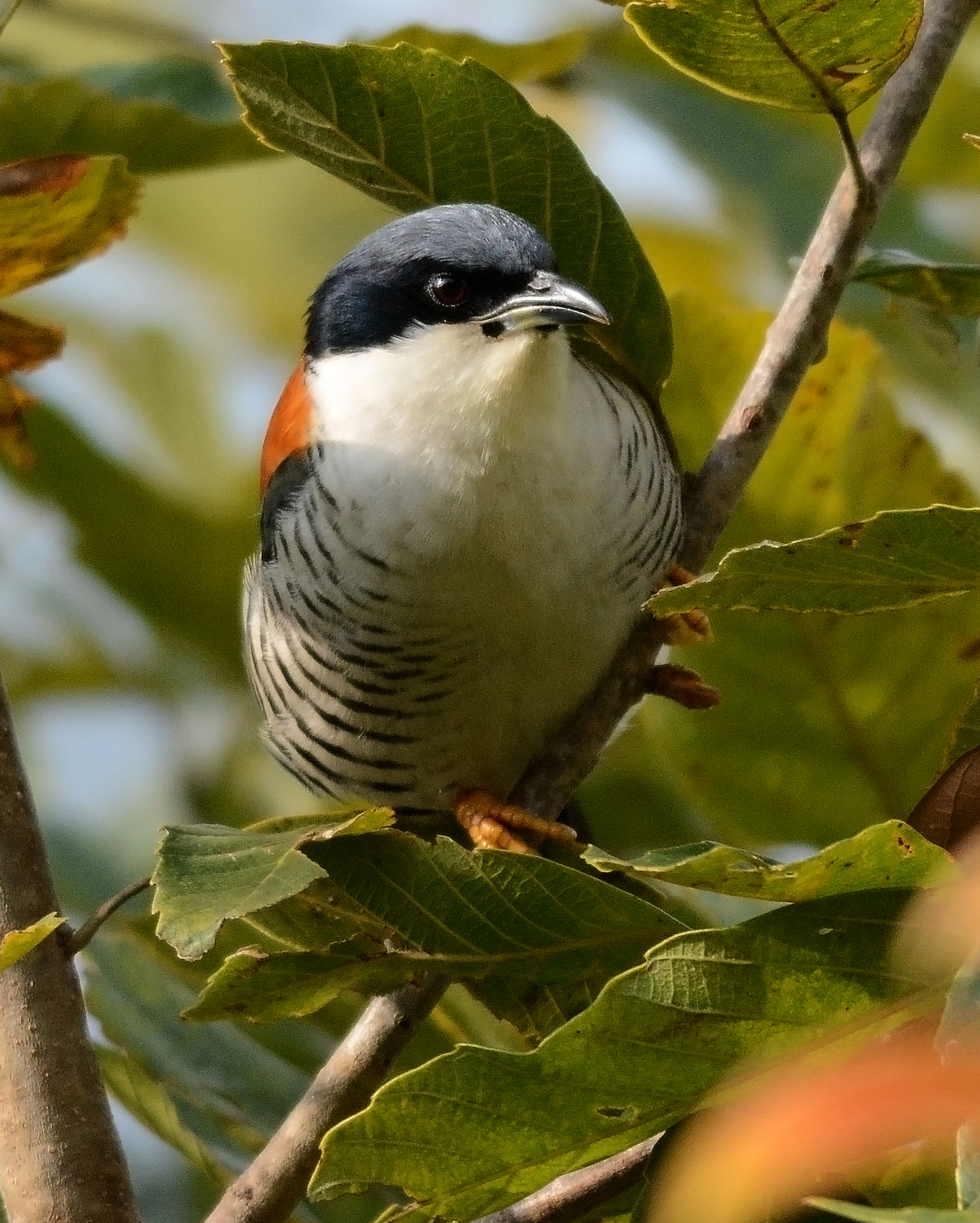
- in Mizoram, India

Conservation status
- Least Concern (IUCN 3.1)

Scientific classification
- Kingdom: Animalia
- Phylum: Chordata
- Class: Aves
- Order: Passeriformes
- Family: Leiothrichidae
- Genus: Cutia
- Species: C. nipalensis

Binomial name
- Cutia nipalensis Hodgson, 1837

Synonyms
- Cutia nipalensis nipalensis Hodgson, 1837

= Himalayan cutia =

Species of bird

The Himalayan cutia (Cutia nipalensis) is a bird species in the family Leiothrichidae. Its scientific name ultimately means "the khutya from Nepal", as Cutia is derived from the Nepali name for these birds, and nipalensis is Latin for "from Nepal".

This species inhabits the Himalayan region, from India to northern Thailand. A subspecies also occurs in Peninsular Malaysia. Previously the genus Cutia was monotypic, but the Vietnamese cutia, for long lumped with the Himalayan birds as a subspecies, has been recently raised to full species status as C. legalleni. Its natural habitats are tropical to subtropical humid montane forests. It is not a bird of the high mountains, however, rather inhabiting broadleaf forest – e.g. of oaks (Quercus) – of the foothills upwards of 1,500 m ASL or so, but rarely if ever ascending above 2,500 m ASL.

The Himalayan cutia is not considered threatened by the IUCN, retaining its pre-split status as a Species of Least Concern; in Bhutan, for example, it is a fairly frequently seen resident.

== Gallery ==
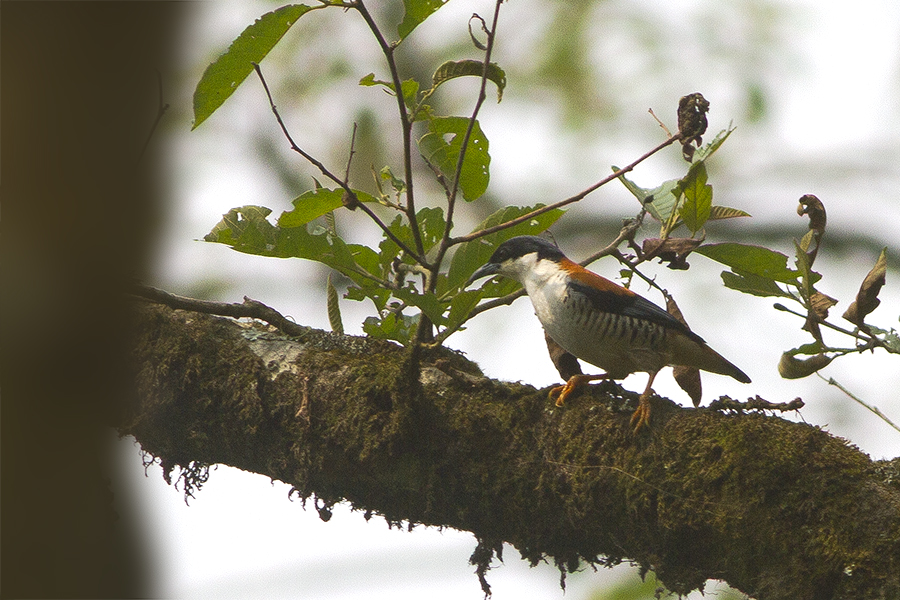
in Neora Valley National Park, West Bengal, India

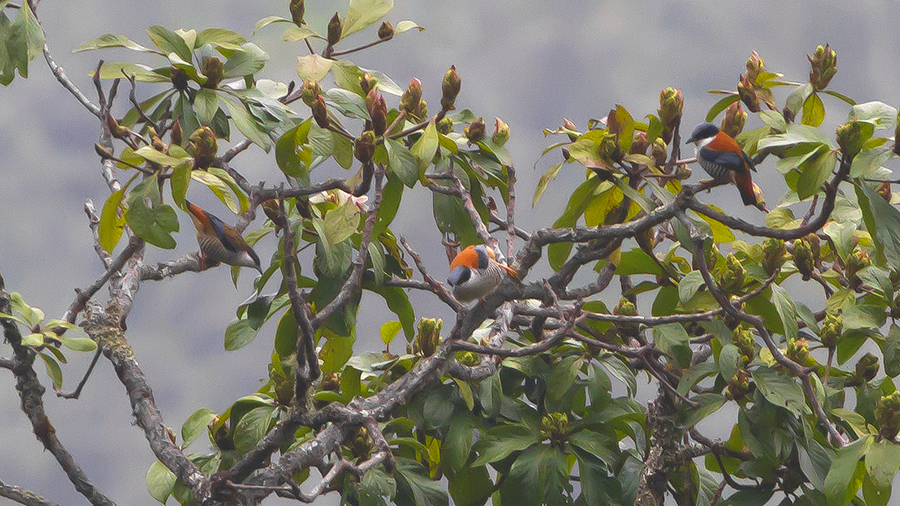
A flock consisting of two males (♂) and a female (♀) in Neora Valley National Park in West Bengal, India

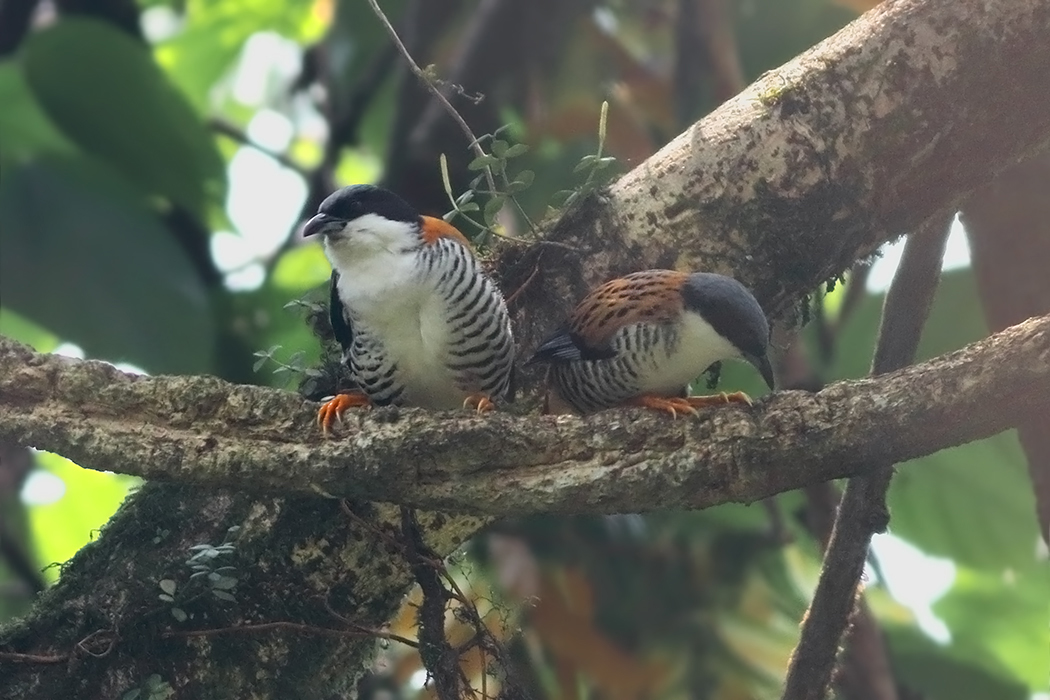
in Pabyuk-Naitam, Sikkim, India

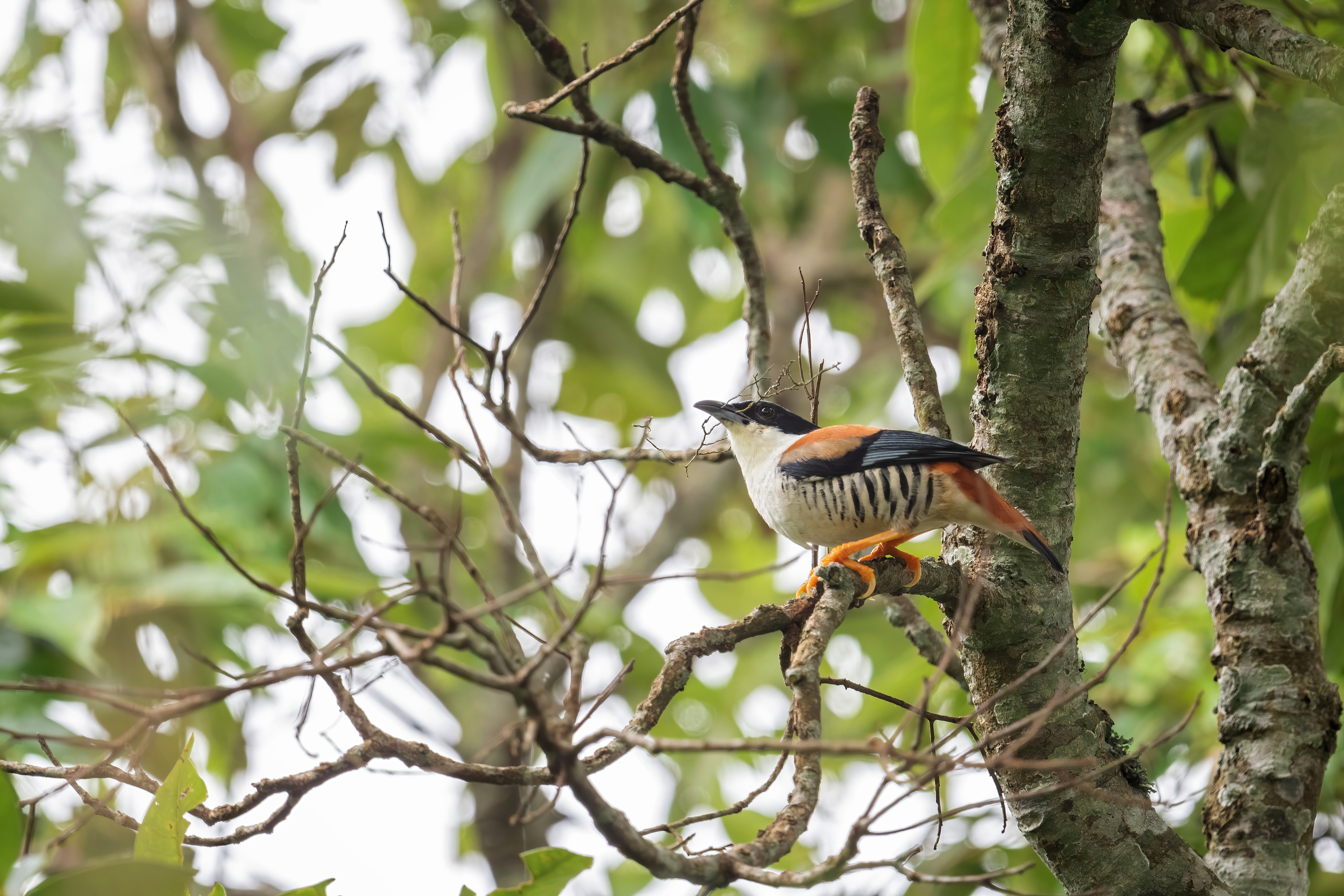
At Chainarang, Chitwan, Nepal.
