= Selam, Champhai =

Selam
- village
- Location in Mizoram, India Selam (India)
- Coordinates: 23.8034409°N 93.2916906°E
- Country: India
- State: Mizoram
- District: Saitual
- Block: Ngopa
- Elevation: 1,062 m (3,484 ft)

Population (2011)
  - Total: 1,017
- Time zone: UTC+5:30 (IST)
- 2011 census code: 271298

Selam is a Zomi village in the Saitual district of Mizoram, India.

== Demographics ==
According to the 2011 census of India, Selam has 209 households. The effective literacy rate (i.e. the literacy rate of population excluding children aged 6 and below) is 98.86%.

The population was recorded to be an increase with 1, 370 people recorded.

Demographics (2011 Census)
	Total	Male	Female
Population	1017	524	493
Children aged below 6 years	228	123	105
Scheduled caste	0	0	0
Scheduled tribe	963	496	467
Literates	780	397	383
Workers (all)	472	239	233
Main workers (total)	463	234	229
Main workers: Cultivators	430	211	219
Main workers: Agricultural labourers	0	0	0
Main workers: Household industry workers	0	0	0
Main workers: Other	33	23	10
Marginal workers (total)	9	5	4
Marginal workers: Cultivators	2	1	1
Marginal workers: Agricultural labourers	0	0	0
Marginal workers: Household industry workers	0	0	0
Marginal workers: Others	7	4	3
Non-workers	545	285	260
