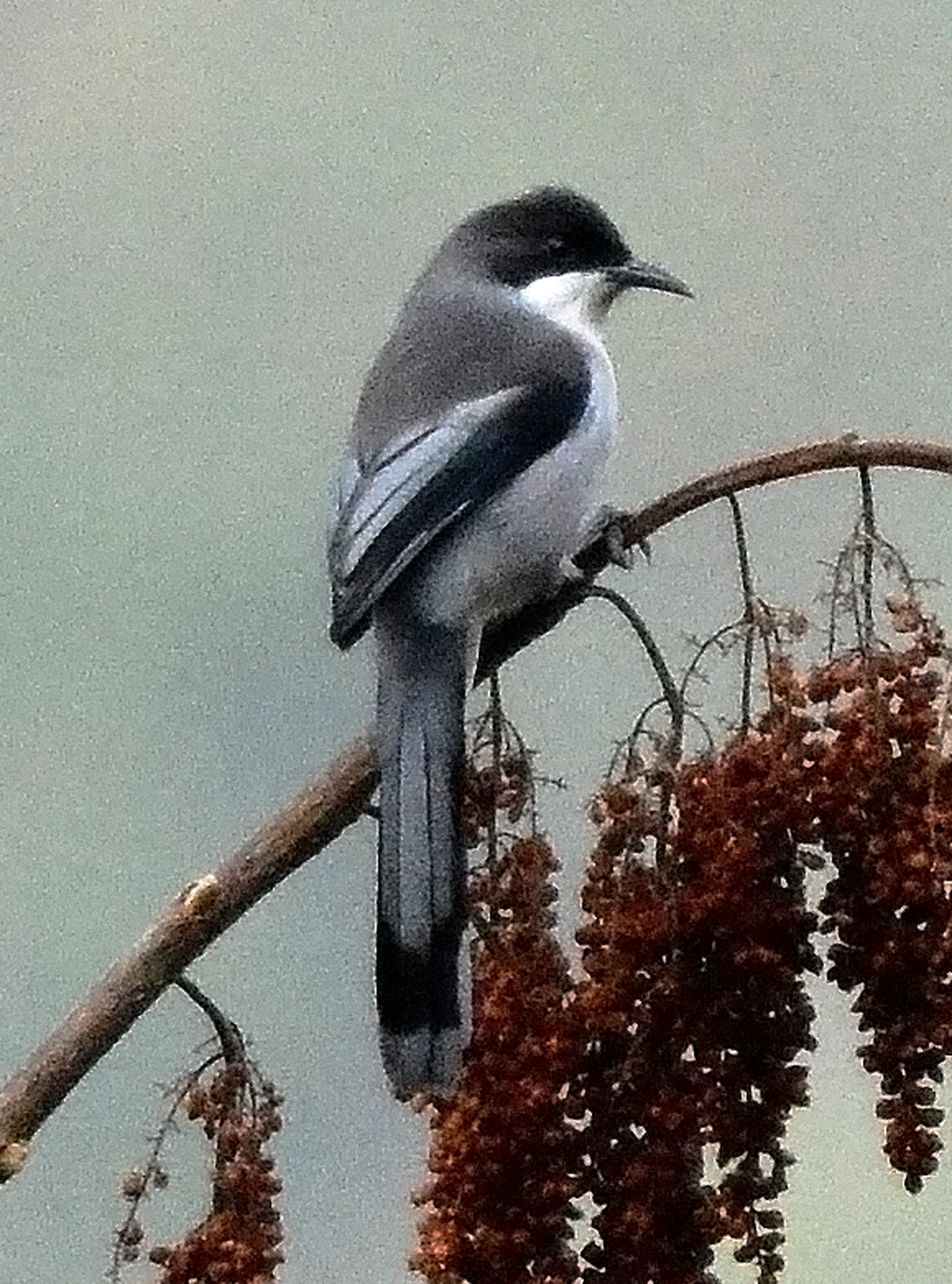
- In Lengteng Wildlife Sanctuary, Mizoram, India

Conservation status
- Least Concern (IUCN 3.1)

Scientific classification
- Kingdom: Animalia
- Phylum: Chordata
- Class: Aves
- Order: Passeriformes
- Family: Leiothrichidae
- Genus: Heterophasia
- Species: H. gracilis

Binomial name
- Heterophasia gracilis (Horsfield, 1840)
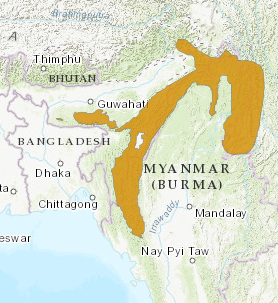
- The image shows the range of the Gray Sibia.

= Grey sibia =

Species of bird

The grey sibia (Heterophasia gracilis) is a species of bird in the family Leiothrichidae.

It is namely present across the Purvanchal Range and western Hengduan Mountains.

Its natural habitat is subtropical or tropical moist montane forest.
