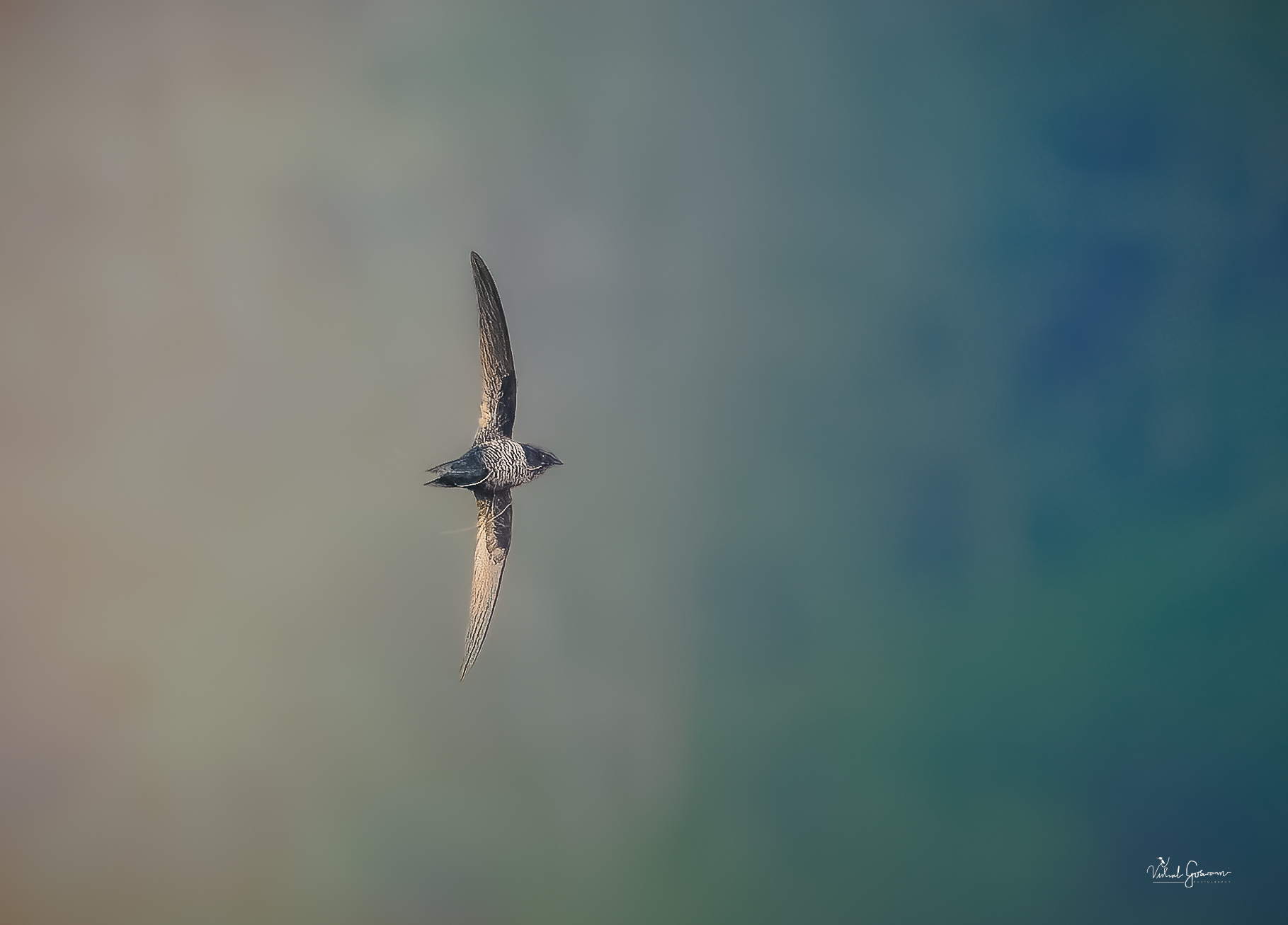

Conservation status
- Near Threatened (IUCN 3.1)

Scientific classification
- Kingdom: Animalia
- Phylum: Chordata
- Class: Aves
- Order: Apodiformes
- Family: Apodidae
- Genus: Apus
- Species: A. acuticauda

Binomial name
- Apus acuticauda (Jerdon, 1864)

= Dark-rumped swift =

Species of bird

The dark-rumped swift (Apus acuticauda) is a species of swift in the family Apodidae. It is found in Bhutan and Northeast India and is a vagrant to Thailand. Its natural habitat is subtropical or tropical moist lowland forests. It is threatened by habitat loss.
