= Streak-throated fulvetta =

The streak-throated fulvetta has been split into the following species:

- Grey-hooded fulvetta, Fulvetta cinereiceps
- Manipur fulvetta, Fulvetta manipurensis
- Taiwan fulvetta, Fulvetta formosana
