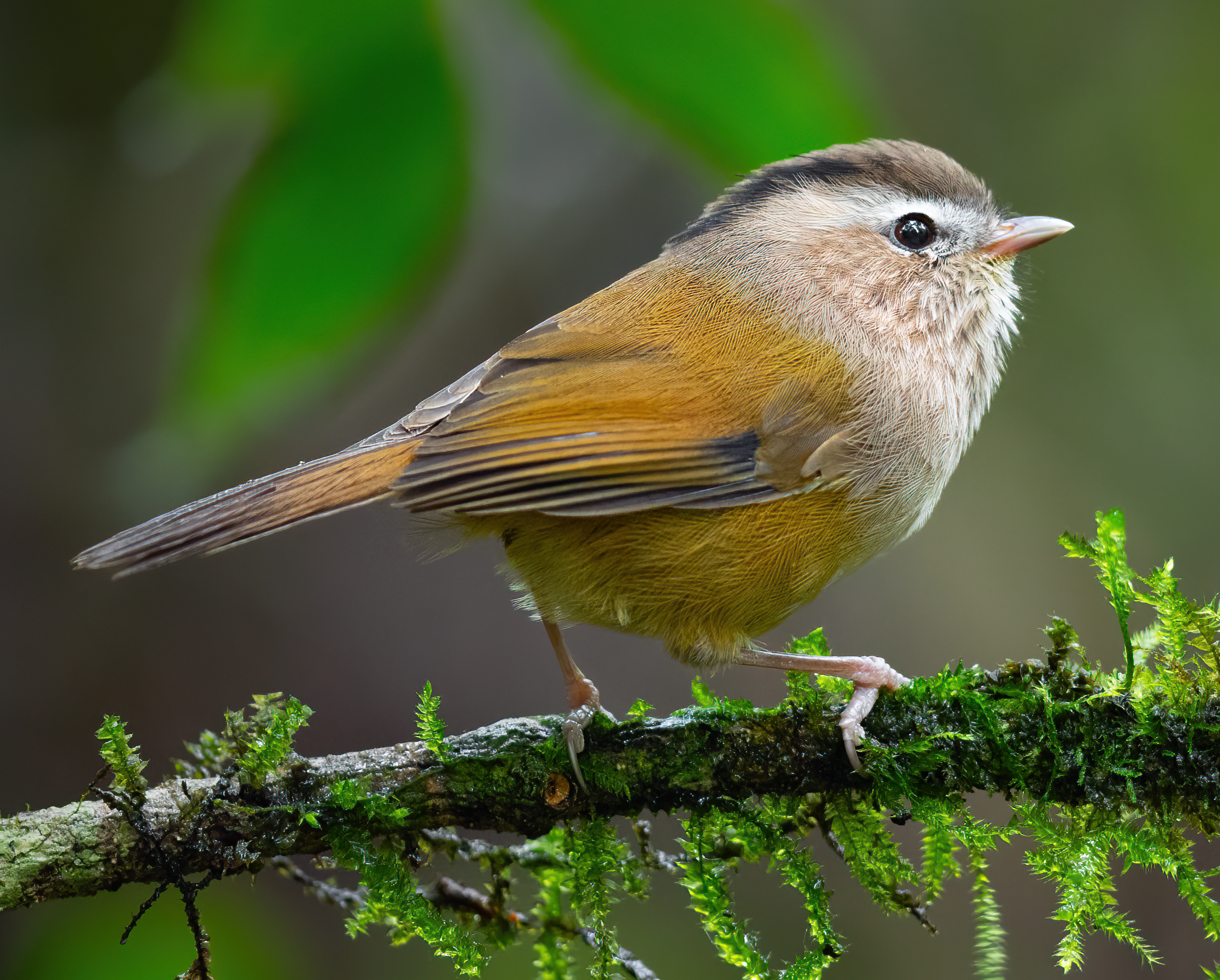

Conservation status
- Least Concern (IUCN 3.1)

Scientific classification
- Kingdom: Animalia
- Phylum: Chordata
- Class: Aves
- Order: Passeriformes
- Family: Paradoxornithidae
- Genus: Fulvetta
- Species: F. danisi

Binomial name
- Fulvetta danisi (Delacour & Greenway, 1941)

Synonyms
- Alcippe danisi

= Indochinese fulvetta =

Species of bird

The Indochinese fulvetta (Fulvetta danisi) is a bird species in the family Paradoxornithidae. Like the other typical fulvettas, it was long included in the Timaliidae genus Alcippe or in the Sylviidae. It was previously considered a subspecies of the spectacled fulvetta, F. ruficapilla.

It is found in Laos and Vietnam. Its natural habitat is temperate forests.
