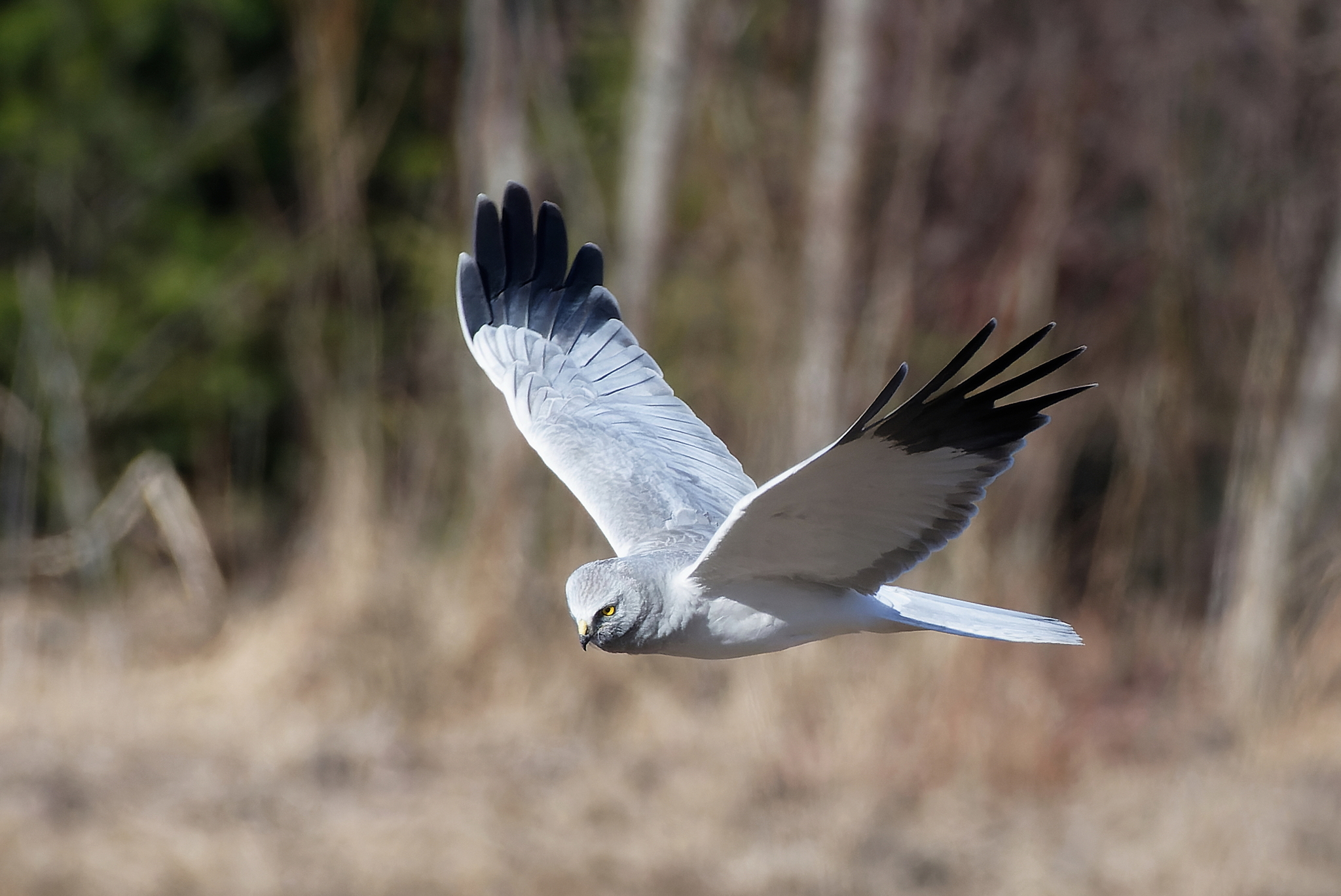
- Adult male in Perm Krai, Russia
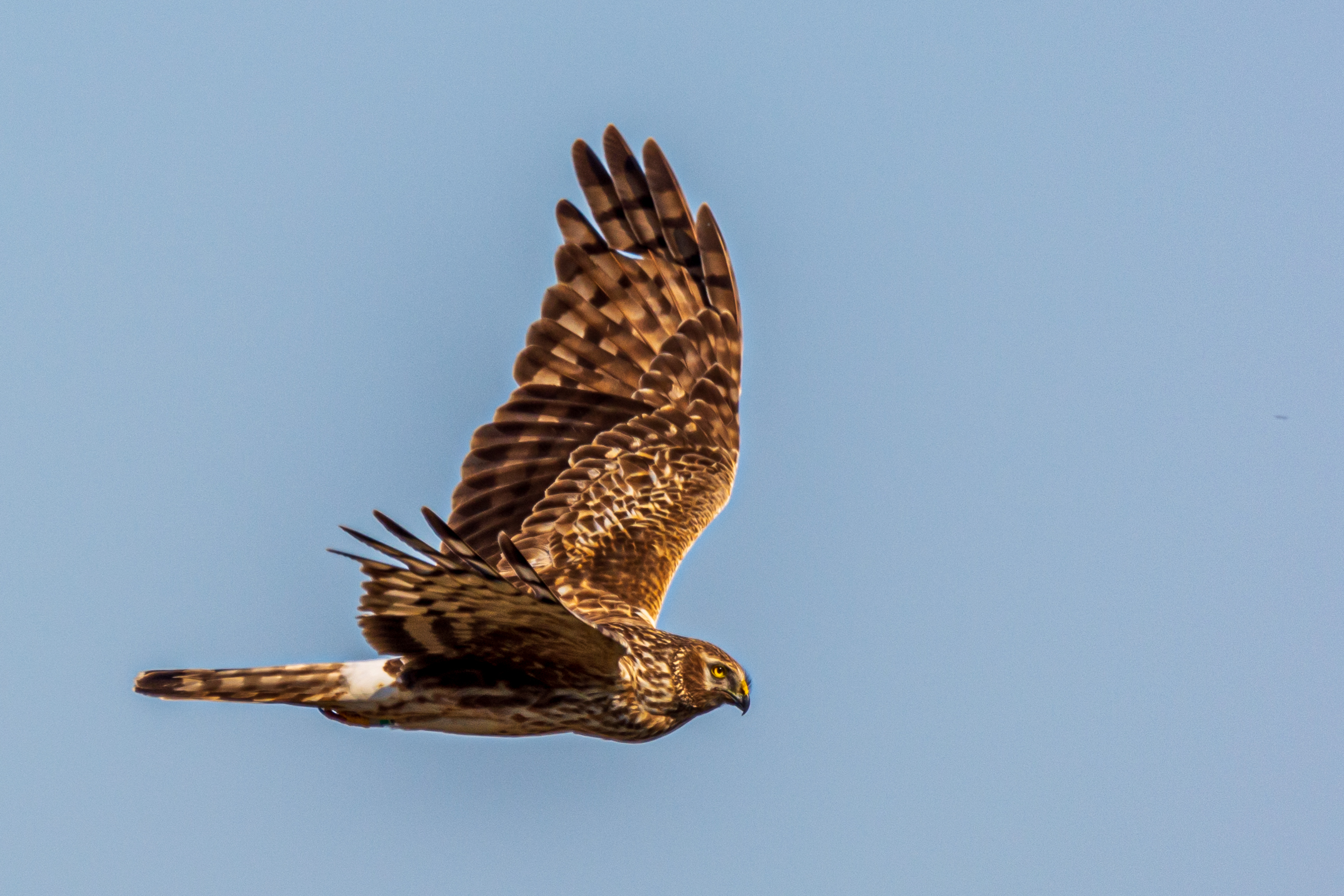
- Adult female in Lower Saxon Wadden Sea National Park, Germany

Conservation status
- Least Concern (IUCN 3.1)

Scientific classification
- Kingdom: Animalia
- Phylum: Chordata
- Class: Aves
- Order: Accipitriformes
- Family: Accipitridae
- Genus: Circus
- Species: C. cyaneus

Binomial name
- Circus cyaneus (Linnaeus, 1766)
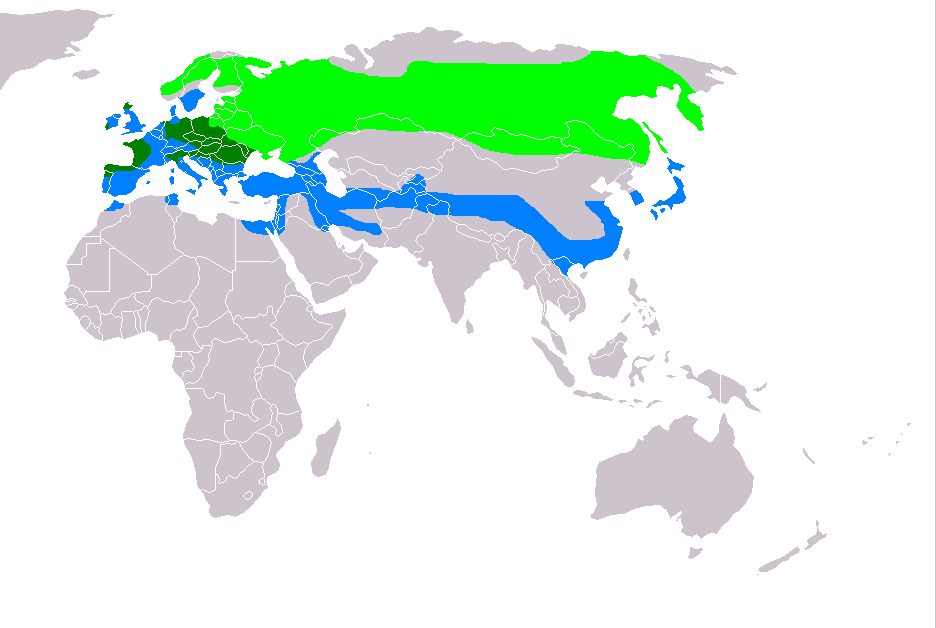
- Range of C. cyaneus Breeding summer visitor Breeding resident Winter visitor

Synonyms
- Falco cyaneus Linnaeus, 1766

= Hen harrier =

Species of bird

The hen harrier (Circus cyaneus) is a bird of prey. It breeds in open areas such as marshes and grasslands in Eurasia and is migratory, moving further south outside of the breeding season. Birds in milder regions, such as France and Great Britain, may be resident year-round, but the higher altitudes are largely deserted in winter. The species is sexually dimorphic; males are smaller and mostly grey and white with black wingtips, whereas females average larger and are predominantly brown and have buff underparts with brown barring. Both sexes have a white rump patch, although it is more noticeable on females and juveniles.

The term "hen harrier" refers to its former habit of preying on free-ranging fowl. The northern harrier (Circus hudsonius) was formerly considered to be a subspecies of the hen harrier.

== Taxonomy ==
In 1758 the English naturalist George Edwards included an illustration and a description of the hen harrier in the first volume of his Gleanings of Natural History. He used the English name "The blue hawk". Edwards based his hand-coloured etching on a bird that had been shot near London. When in 1766 the Swedish naturalist Carl Linnaeus updated his Systema Naturae for the twelfth edition, he placed the hen harrier with the falcons and eagles in the genus Falco. Linnaeus included a brief description, coined the binomial name Falco cyaneus and cited Edwards' work. The hen harrier is now placed in the genus Circus that was introduced by the French naturalist Bernard Germain de Lacépède in 1799. The genus name Circus is derived from the Ancient Greek kirkos, referring to a bird of prey named for its circling flight (kirkos, "circle"). The specific epithet cyaneus is from Latin and means "dark blue". The species is monotypic: no subspecies are recognised.

The hen harrier was formerly considered to be conspecific with the northern harrier.

== Description ==
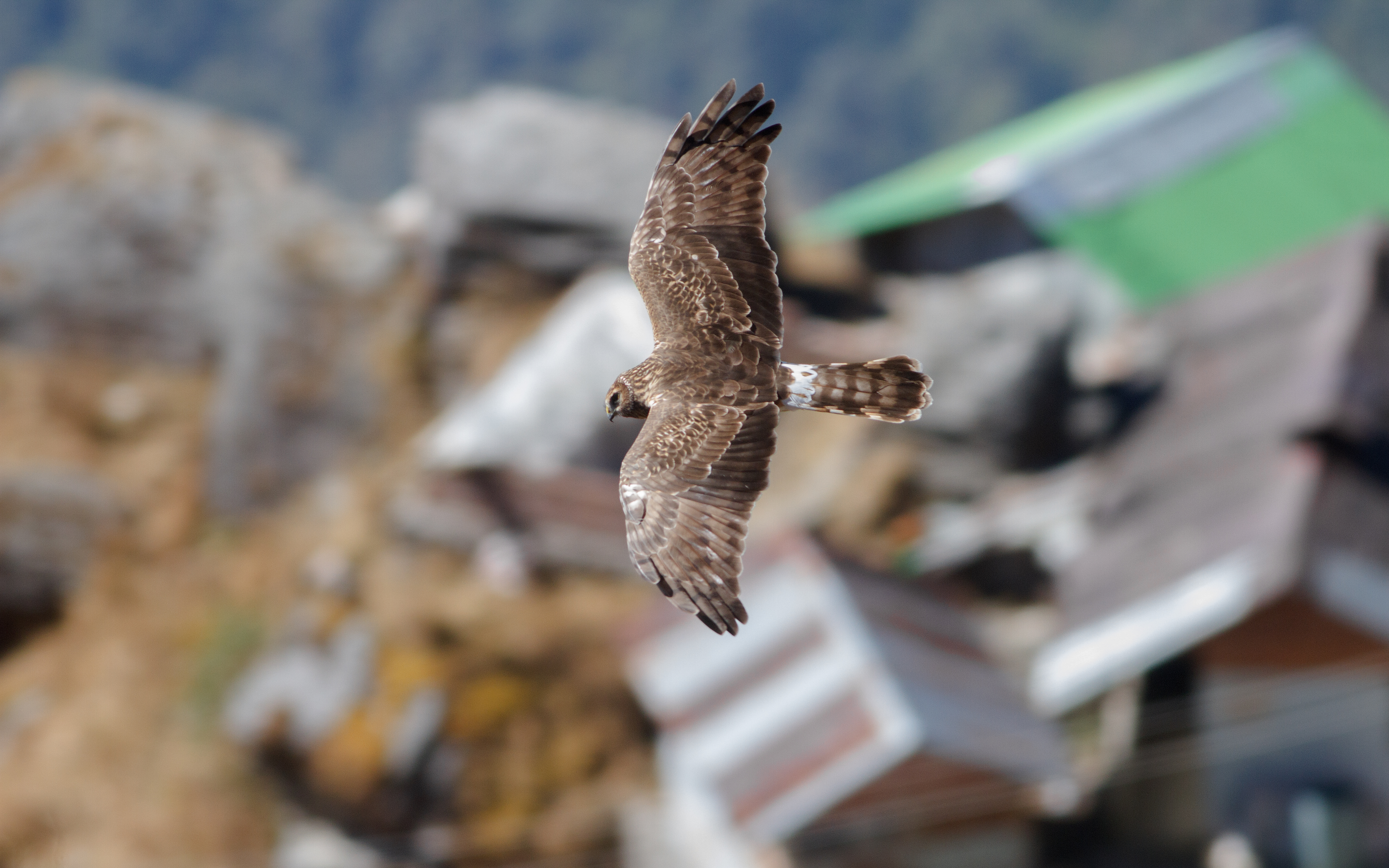
Female soaring in Pangolakha Wildlife Sanctuary, India

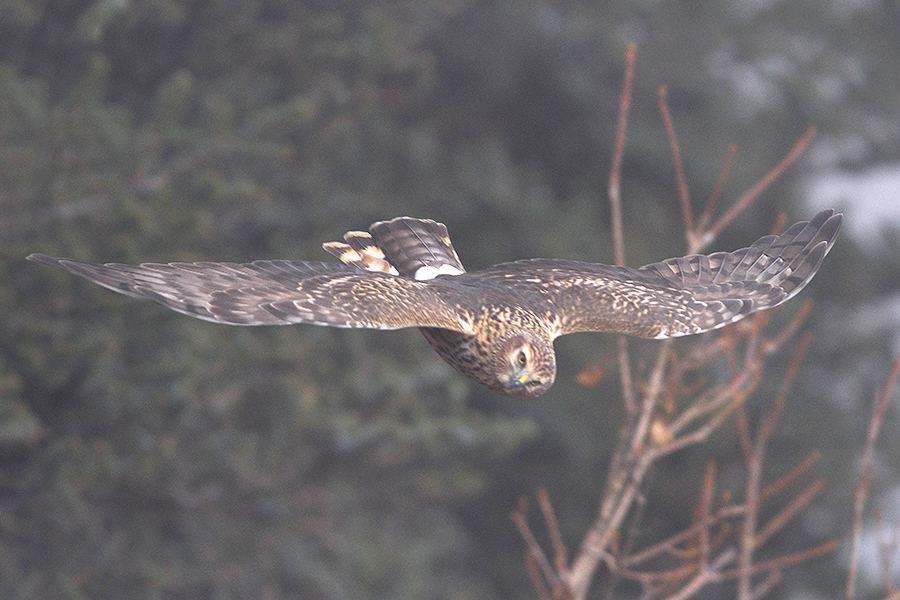
Bird in flight at an elevation of over 12,500 ft in Pangolakha Wildlife Sanctuary in East Sikkim district, India in the month of November

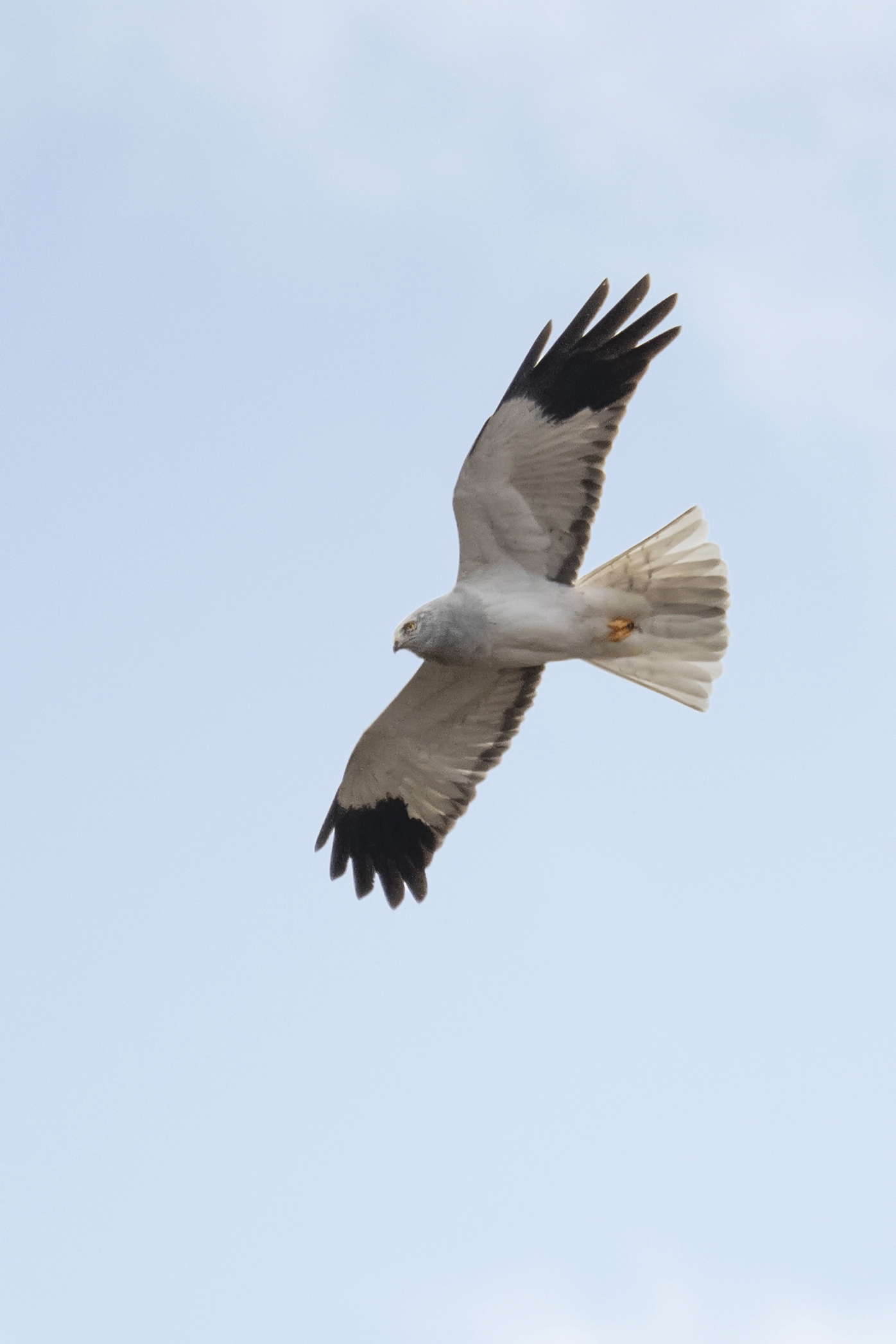
Adult male in flight in Langholm, Scotland

The hen harrier is 41–52 cm (16–20 in) long with a 97–122 cm (38–48 in) wingspan. It resembles other harriers in having distinct male and female plumages. The sexes also differ in weight, with males weighing 290 to 400 g (10 to 14 oz), with an average of 350 g (12 oz), and females weighing 390 to 750 g (14 to 26 oz), with an average of 530 g (19 oz). Among standard measurements, the wing chord is 32.8 to 40.6 cm (12.9 to 16.0 in), the tail is 19.3 to 25.8 cm (7.6 to 10.2 in) and the tarsus is 7.1 to 8.9 cm (2.8 to 3.5 in). It is relatively long winged and long tailed.

The male is mainly grey above and white below except for the upper breast, which is grey like the upperparts, and the rump, which is white; the wings are grey with black wingtips. The female is brown above with white upper tail coverts, hence females, and the similar juveniles, are often called "ringtails". Their underparts are buff with brown barring. Juveniles resemble females but with less distinct barring, dark brown secondaries dark brown and less-barred belly.

The female gives a whistled piih-eh when receiving food from the male, and her alarm call is chit-it-it-it-it-et-it. The male calls chek-chek-chek, with a more bouncing chuk-uk-uk-uk during his display flight.

== Behaviour ==
This medium-sized raptor breeds on moorland, bogs, farmland, marshes, grasslands, swamps and other assorted open areas. A male will maintain a territory averaging 2.6 km^{2} (1.0 sq mi), though male territories have ranged from 1.7 to 150 km^{2} (0.66 to 57.92 sq mi).

These are one of the few raptorial birds known to practice polygyny – one male mates with several females. Up to five females have been known to mate with one male in a season. A supplementary feeding experiment on the Orkney islands showed that rates of polygyny were influenced by food levels; males provided with extra food had more breeding females than 'control' males that received no extra food.

The nest is constructed on the ground or on a mound of dirt or vegetation. Nests are made of sticks and are lined inside with grass and leaves. Four to eight (exceptionally 2 to 10) whitish eggs are laid. The eggs measure approximately 47 mm × 36 mm (1.9 in × 1.4 in). The eggs are incubated mostly by the female for 31 to 32 days. When incubating eggs, the female sits on the nest while the male hunts and brings food to her and the chicks. The male will help feed chicks after they hatch, but does not usually watch them for a greater period of time than around 5 minutes. The male usually passes off food to the female, which she then feeds to the young, although later the female will capture food and simply drop into the nest for her nestlings to eat. The chicks fledge at around 36 days old, though breeding maturity is not reached until 2 years in females and 3 years in males.

In winter, the hen harrier is a bird of open country, and will then roost communally, often with merlins and marsh harriers. There is now an accepted record of transatlantic vagrancy by the northern harrier, with a juvenile being recorded in Scilly, Great Britain from October 1982 to June 1983.

=== Hunting behaviour ===
This is a typical harrier, which hunts on long wings held in a shallow V in its low flight during which the bird closely hugs the contours of the land below it. Hen harriers hunt primarily small mammals, as do most harriers. Up to 95% of the diet comprises small mammals. However, birds are hunted with some regularity as well, especially by males. Preferred avian prey include passerines of open country (i.e. sparrows, larks, pipits), small shorebirds and the young of waterfowl and galliforms. Supplementing the diet occasionally are amphibians (especially frogs), reptiles and insects (especially orthopterans). The species has been observed to hunt bats if these are available. Larger prey, such as rabbits and adult ducks are taken sometimes and harriers have been known to subdue these by drowning them in water. Harriers hunt by surprising prey while flying low to the ground in open areas, as they drift low over fields and moors. The harriers circle an area several times listening and looking for prey. Harriers use hearing regularly to find prey, as they have exceptionally good hearing for diurnal raptors, this being the function of their owl-like facial disc. This harrier tends to be a very vocal bird while it glides over its hunting ground.

=== Mortality and competition ===
Little information is available on the longevity in hen harriers. The longest-lived known bird is 16 years and 5 months. However, adults rarely live beyond 8 years. Early mortality is mainly due to predation. Predators of eggs and nestlings include badgers, foxes, crows and ravens, dogs and owls. Both parents attack potential predators with alarm calls and striking with talons. Short-eared owls are natural competitors of this species, preferring the same prey and habitat, and having a similar geographic distribution. Occasionally, both harriers and short-eared owls will harass each other until the victim drops its prey and it can be stolen, a practice known as kleptoparasitism. Most often, the harriers are the aggressors, stealing prey from the owls.

== Status ==
This species has a wide geographical distribution and, although there is evidence of a population decline, it is not thought to be approaching the thresholds for the IUCN Red List criterion of population decline (i.e., a decline of more than 30% in ten years or three generations). It is therefore classified as "least concern". However, in Britain and Ireland, hen harrier populations are in a critical state, mainly due to habitat loss and illegal shooting on grouse moors. The hen harrier is on the British red list. There is sufficient suitable habitat to support over 300 breeding pairs of hen harriers in England alone, yet only 34 successful nests were recorded in 2022. Furthermore, many of the young birds do not survive beyond their first year, before the onset of sexual maturity at the age of two. Most UK Hen Harriers are found in Scotland, but even there the population declined by 27% between 2004 and 2016.

== Relationship with humans ==
In some parts of Europe people believed that seeing a hen harrier perched on a house was a sign that three people would die. Unlike many raptors, hen harriers have historically been looked upon favourably by farmers because they eat predators of quail eggs and mice that damage crops. Harriers are sometimes called "good hawks" because they do not pose a threat to poultry as some hawks do. In the United Kingdom, hen harriers include red grouse in their diet, and so harriers are regarded by some people as pests. This may lead to birds being shot or trapped, and eggs and nests being destroyed. According to the RSPB, the hen harrier is the most persecuted bird of prey in the UK relative to population size as of 2025, with 102 confirmed and suspected persecution incidents between 2020 and 2024.

== Forestry and hen harriers ==
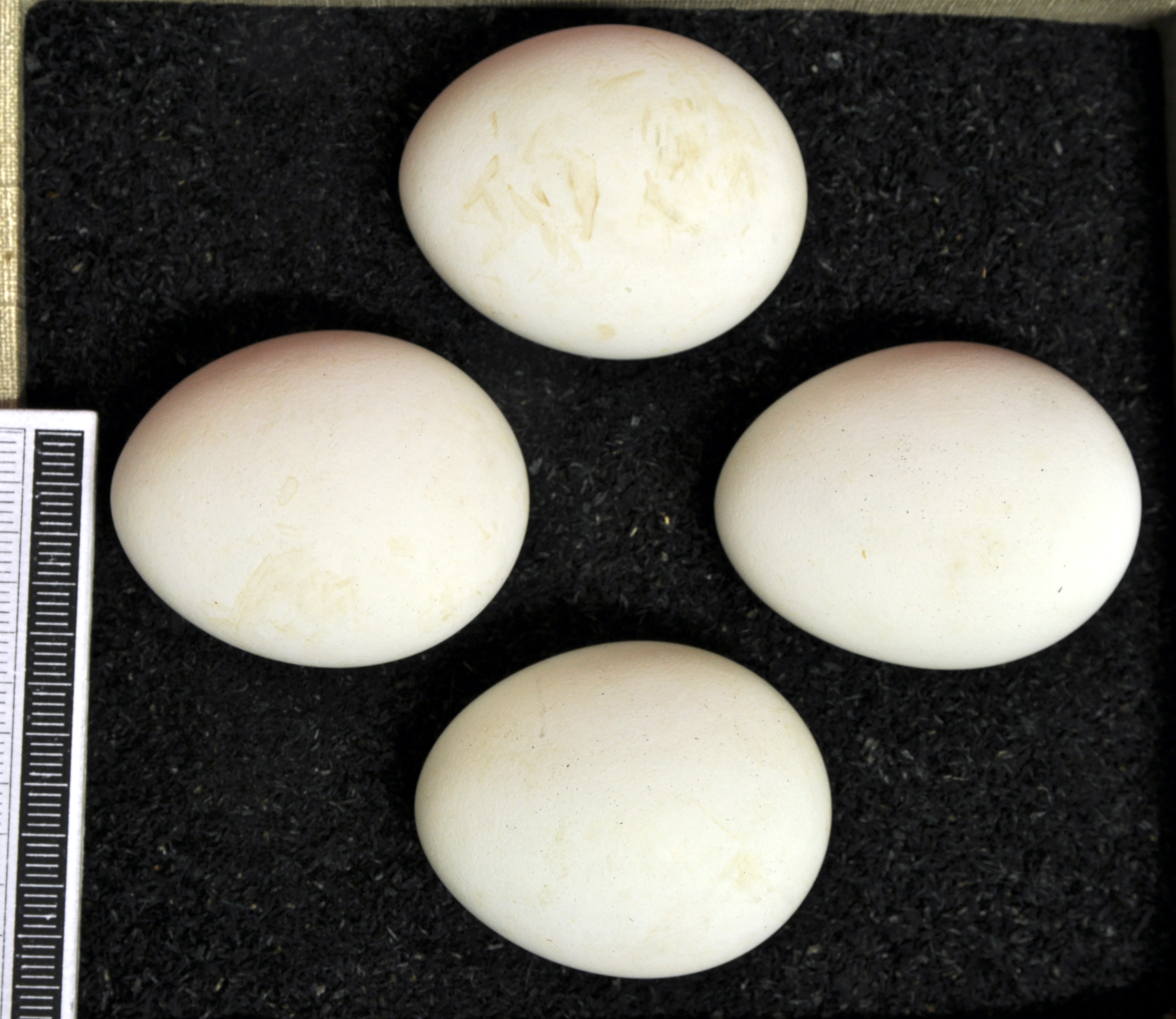
Eggs, Collection Museum Wiesbaden

The hen harrier is a bird of open habitats such as heather moorland and extensive agricultural land. However, much of its range, particularly in Ireland and parts of western Britain, has been (and continues to be) afforested, mainly with non-native conifers such as Sitka spruce (Picea sitchensis) from North America. Hen harriers nest and forage in commercial forestry plantations before the canopy closes (typically at between 9 and 12 years old), but do not make much use of thicket and later growth stages, which typically comprise between 2/3 and 3/4 of the commercial growth cycle. Where afforestation replaces habitats previously used by hen harriers they will therefore tend to reduce overall habitat availability. However, where afforestation takes place in areas that were previously underutilised by hen harriers, it may increase the value of such areas to the species in the long-term. Areas dominated by forestry may remain suitable to hen harriers provided that a mosaic of age classes is maintained within the forest so that areas of young, pre-thicket forest are always available.
