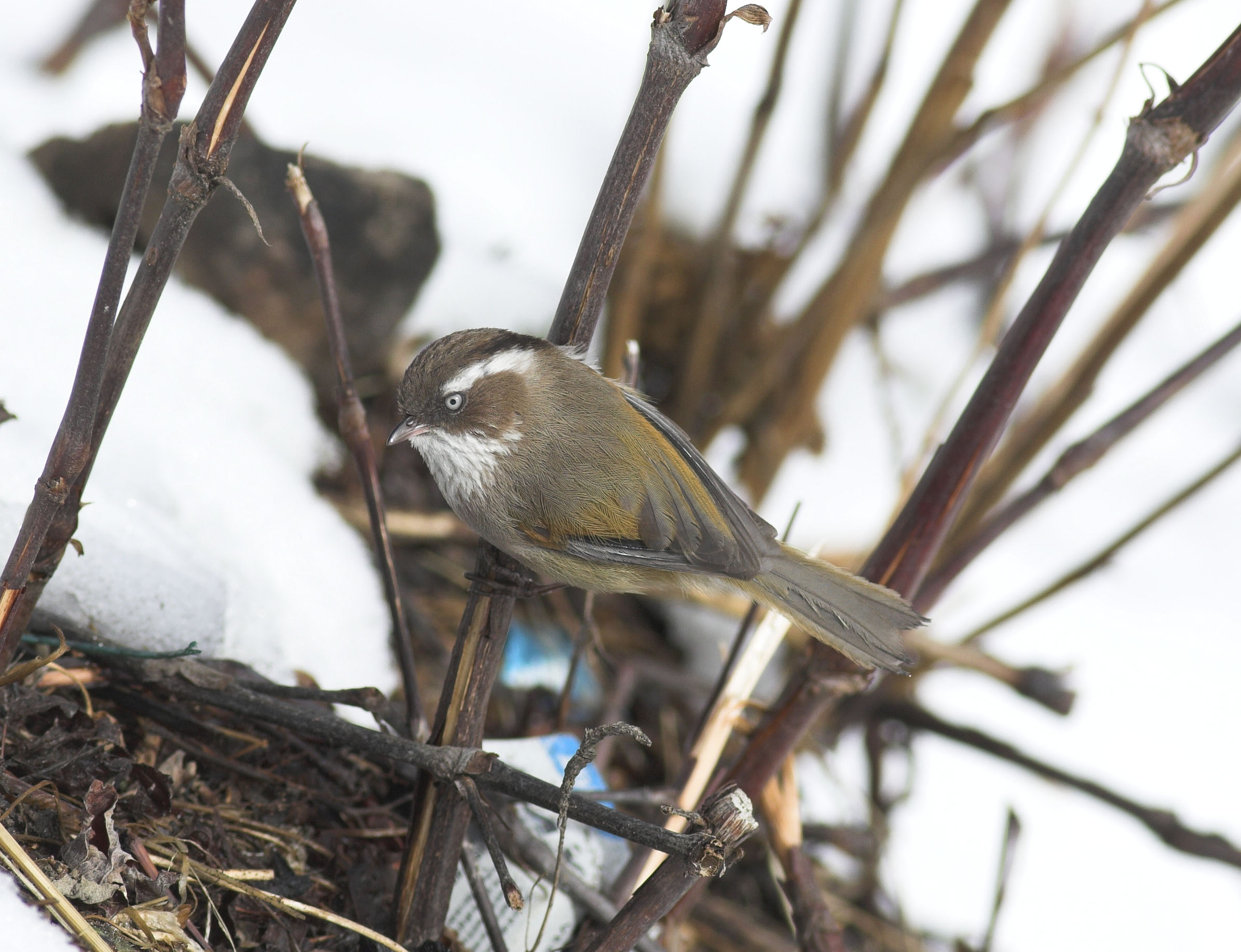
- White-browed fulvetta (Fulvetta vinipectus)

Scientific classification
- Kingdom: Animalia
- Phylum: Chordata
- Class: Aves
- Order: Passeriformes
- Family: Paradoxornithidae
- Genus: Fulvetta; David & Oustalet, 1877

Type species
- Siva cinereiceps Jules, J, 1871

Species
- 8, and see text

= Fulvetta =

Typical fulvettas

Genus of birds

Fulvetta is a genus of passerine birds. Originally proposed in 1877, it was recently reestablished for the typical fulvettas, which were long included with their presumed relatives in the Timaliidae (Old World babbler) genus Alcippe. But they are actually quite closely related to the parrotbills, and are thus now placed in the family Paradoxornithidae.

== Taxonomy ==
The genus Fulvetta was introduced in 1877 by the French naturalists Armand David and Émile Oustalet in their book Les Oiseaux de la Chine. They listed three species in the genus but did not specify the type species. In 1883 Richard Bowdler Sharpe designated the type as Siva cinereiceps Jules, J, the grey-hooded fulvetta. The genus name is a diminutive of Latin fulvus meaning "tawny" or "yellowish-brown".

The genus contains the following eight species:

Image	Common name	Scientific name
	Spectacled fulvetta	Fulvetta ruficapilla
	Indochinese fulvetta	Fulvetta danisi
	Chinese fulvetta	Fulvetta striaticollis
	White-browed fulvetta	Fulvetta vinipectus
	Grey-hooded fulvetta	Fulvetta cinereiceps
	Taiwan fulvetta	Fulvetta formosana
	Manipur fulvetta	Fulvetta manipurensis
	Brown-throated fulvetta	Fulvetta ludlowi
