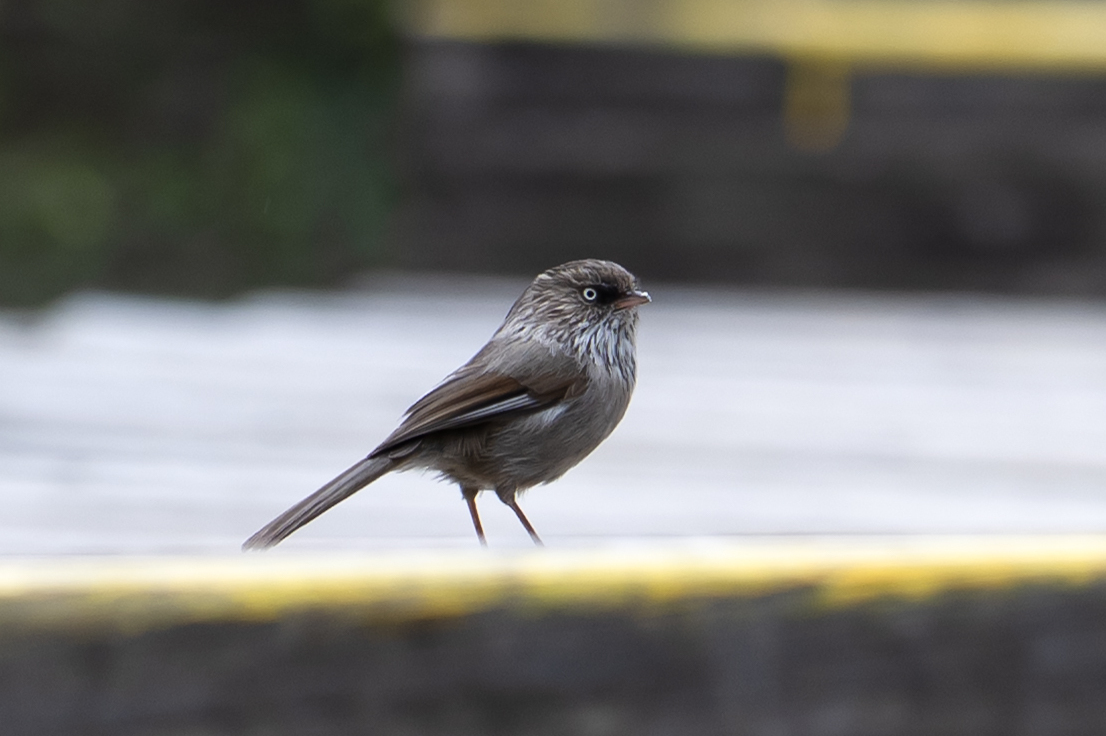

Conservation status
- Least Concern (IUCN 3.1)

Scientific classification
- Kingdom: Animalia
- Phylum: Chordata
- Class: Aves
- Order: Passeriformes
- Family: Paradoxornithidae
- Genus: Fulvetta
- Species: F. striaticollis

Binomial name
- Fulvetta striaticollis (Verreaux, J, 1871)

= Chinese fulvetta =

Species of bird

The Chinese fulvetta (Fulvetta striaticollis) is a bird species in the family Paradoxornithidae. Like the other typical fulvettas, it was long included in the Timaliidae genus Alcippe or in the Sylviidae.

It is found in China.
