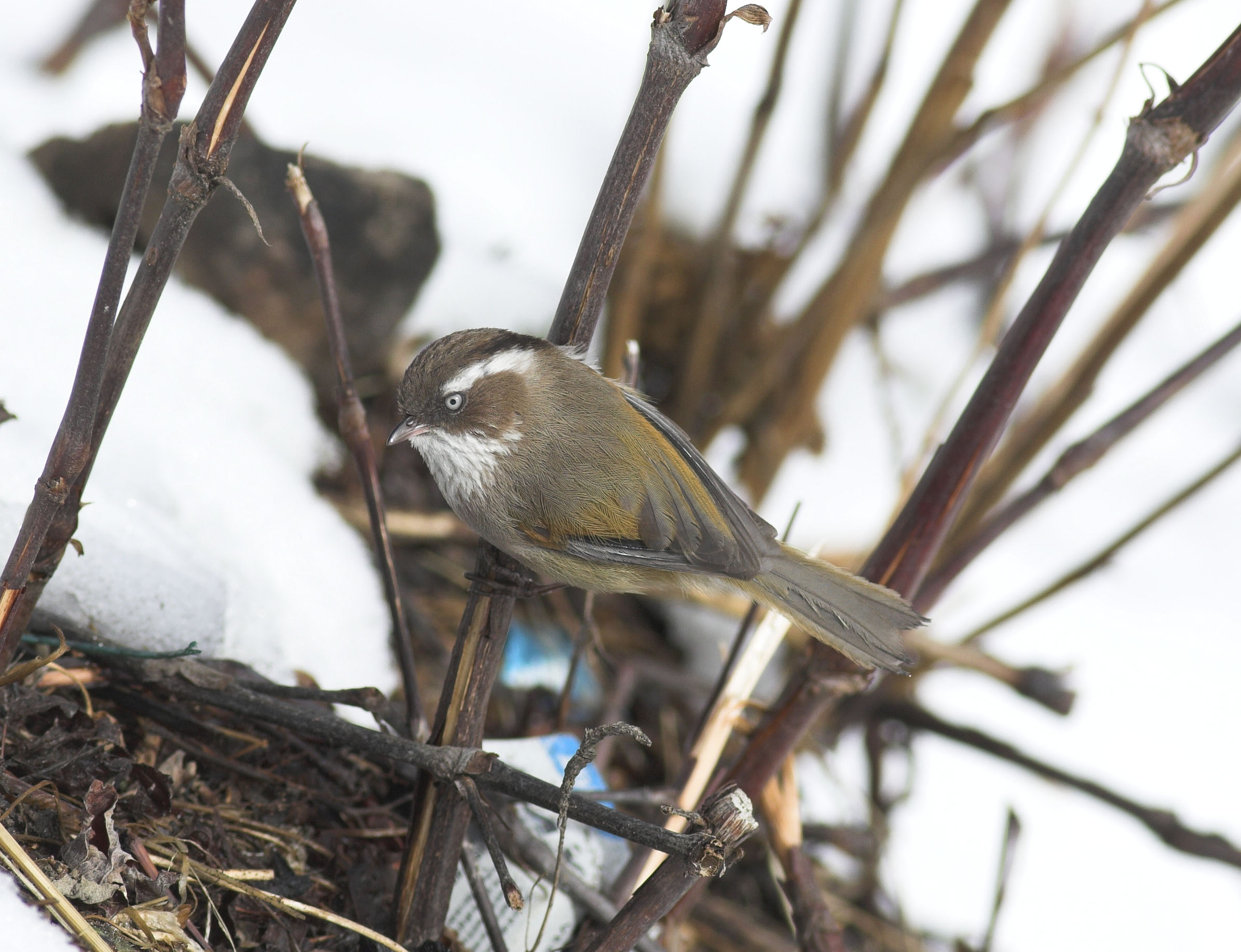

Conservation status
- Least Concern (IUCN 3.1)

Scientific classification
- Kingdom: Animalia
- Phylum: Chordata
- Class: Aves
- Order: Passeriformes
- Family: Paradoxornithidae
- Genus: Fulvetta
- Species: F. vinipectus

Binomial name
- Fulvetta vinipectus (Hodgson, 1837)

Synonyms
- Alcippe vinipectus

= White-browed fulvetta =

Species of bird

The white-browed fulvetta (Fulvetta vinipectus) is a bird species in the family Paradoxornithidae. Like the other typical fulvettas, it was long included in the Timaliidae genus Alcippe or in the Sylviidae.

Ranging across the Indian subcontinent and Southeast Asia, it is endemic to Bhutan, India, Myanmar, Nepal and Vietnam. Its natural habitat is temperate forests.

== Gallery ==
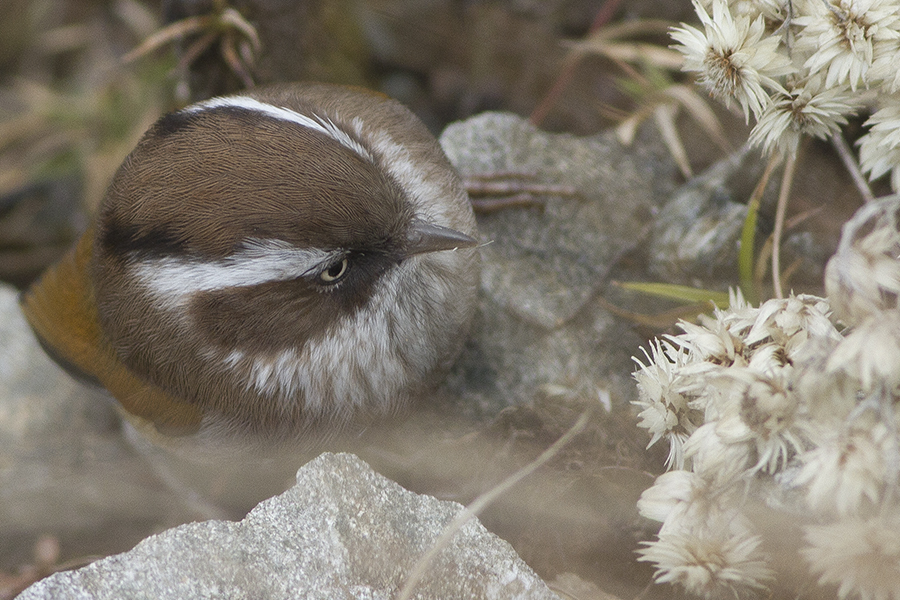
Head pattern of F. v. chumbiensis from Sikkim, India

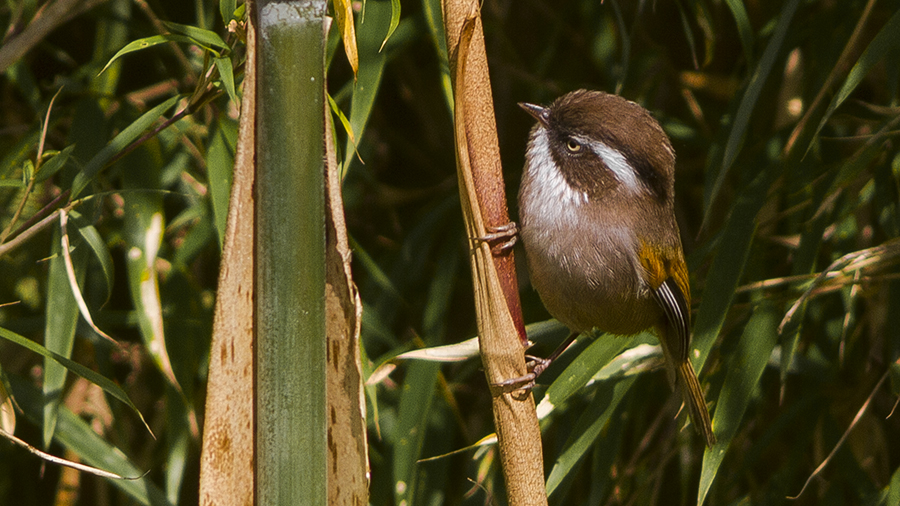
Species F. v. chumbiensis from Pangolakha Wildlife Sanctuary, Sikkim, India

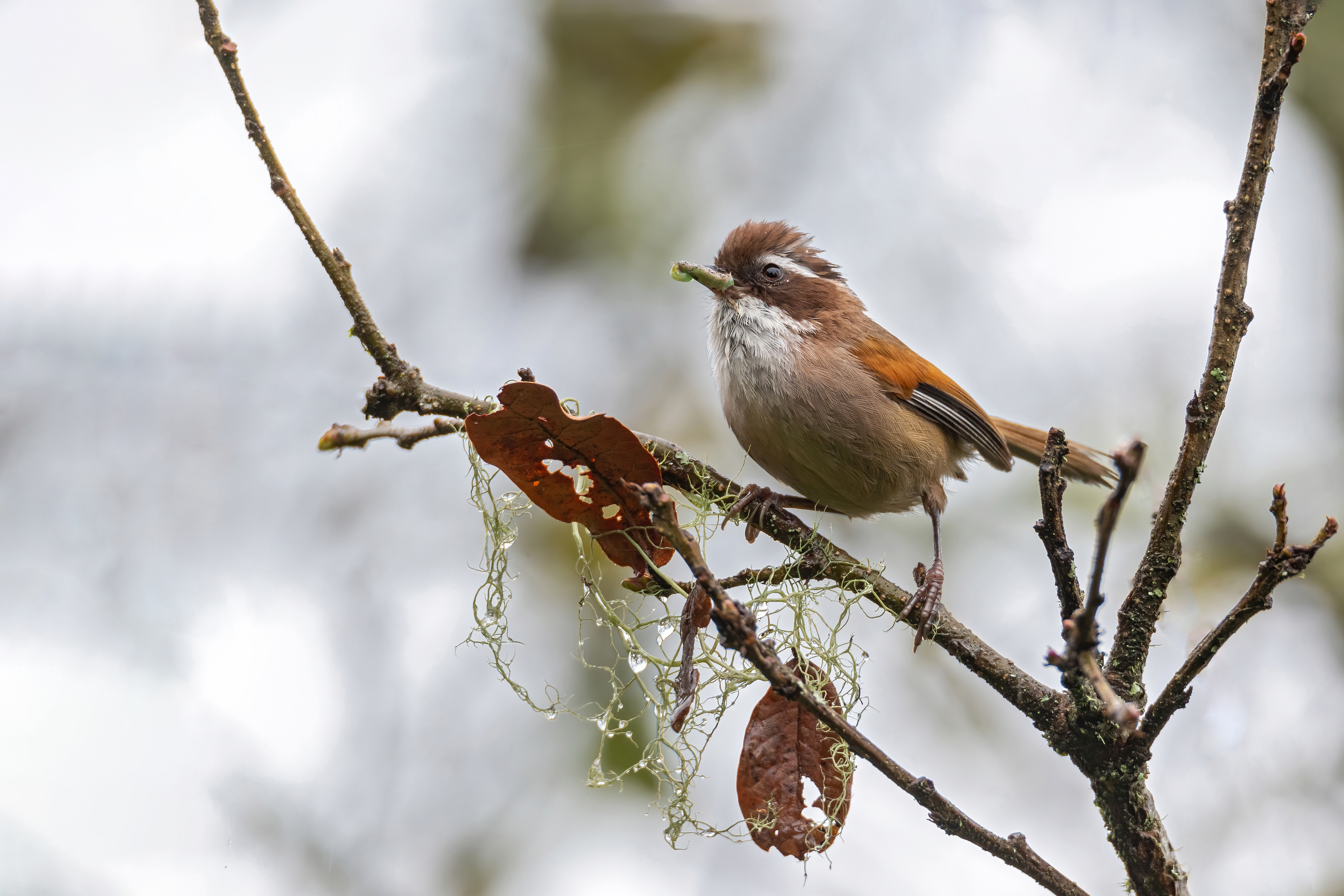
In Phoolchoki Forest, Godawari, Lalitpur Nepal.
