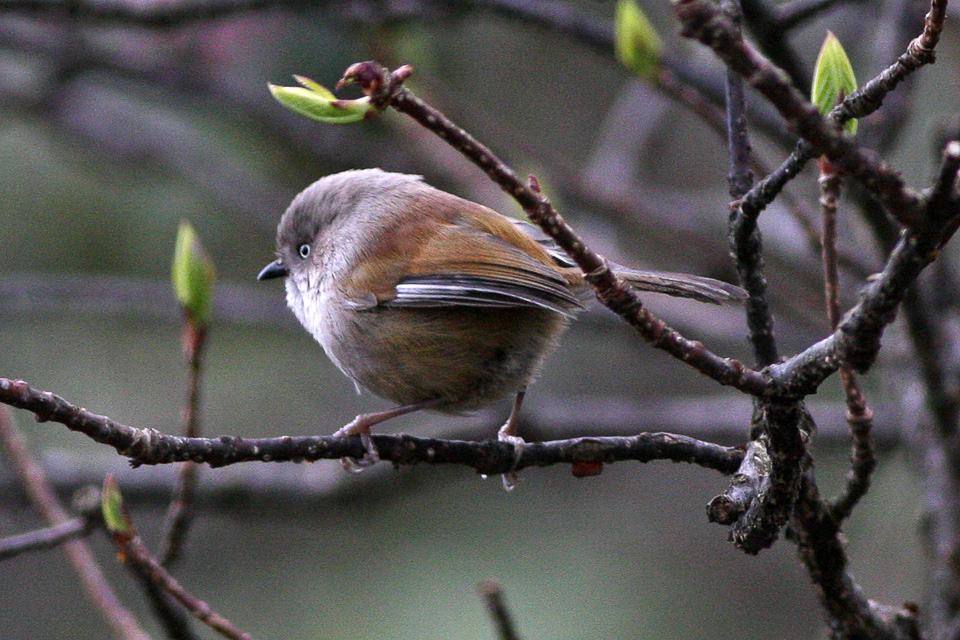

Conservation status
- Least Concern (IUCN 3.1)

Scientific classification
- Kingdom: Animalia
- Phylum: Chordata
- Class: Aves
- Order: Passeriformes
- Family: Paradoxornithidae
- Genus: Fulvetta
- Species: F. cinereiceps

Binomial name
- Fulvetta cinereiceps (Verreaux, J, 1871)

Synonyms
- Alcippe cinereiceps

= Grey-hooded fulvetta =

Species of bird

The grey-hooded fulvetta (Fulvetta cinereiceps) is a bird species in the family Paradoxornithidae. Like the other typical fulvettas, it was long included in the Timaliidae genus Alcippe or in the Sylviidae.

Formerly, F. cinereiceps was known as Manipur fulvetta, the birds properly referred to with this name have been split off and are now usually treated as a distinct species, F. manipurensis. Another former subspecies of F. cinereiceps that is nowadays usually considered distinct is the Taiwan fulvetta (F. formosana).

Its natural habitat is temperate forest. It is not considered threatened by the IUCN.
