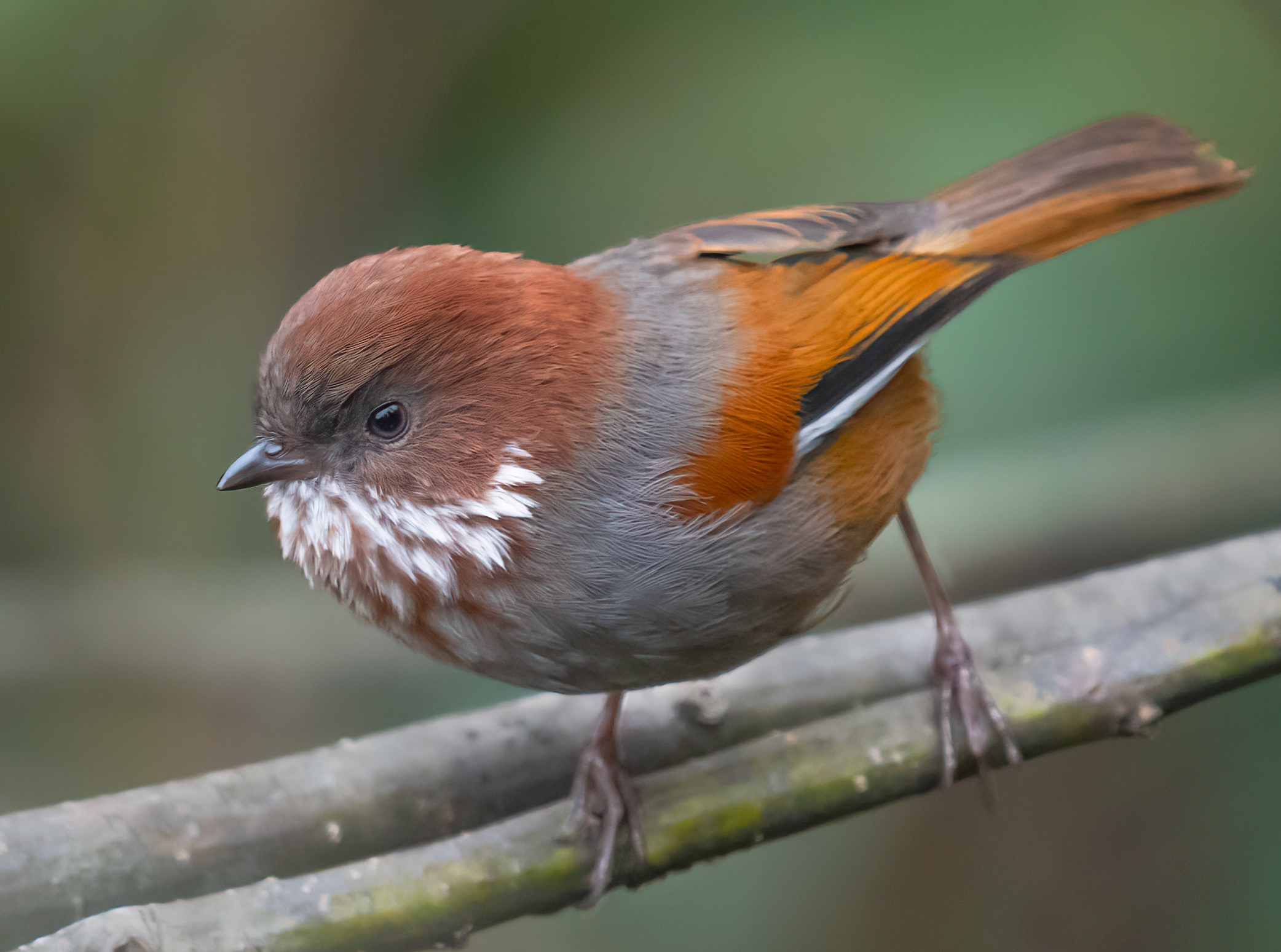

Conservation status
- Least Concern (IUCN 3.1)

Scientific classification
- Kingdom: Animalia
- Phylum: Chordata
- Class: Aves
- Order: Passeriformes
- Family: Paradoxornithidae
- Genus: Fulvetta
- Species: F. ludlowi

Binomial name
- Fulvetta ludlowi Kinnear, 1935

= Brown-throated fulvetta =

Species of bird

The brown-throated fulvetta or Ludlow's fulvetta (Fulvetta ludlowi) is a species of bird in the family Paradoxornithidae. Like the other typical fulvettas, it was long included in the Timaliidae genus Alcippe or in the Sylviidae. It is found in Bhutan, China, India, Myanmar, and Nepal.
