= Pangolakha Wildlife Sanctuary =

Wildlife sanctuary in India

- पाङ्लखा
- IUCN category IV (habitat/species management area)
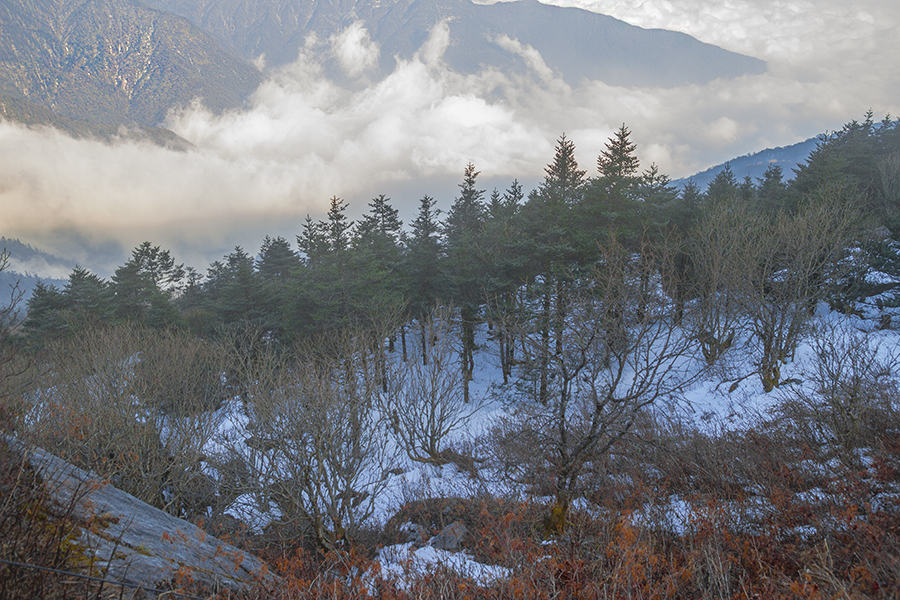
- Landscape in Pangolakha Wildlife Sanctuary

- Location within Sikkim Location within India
- Interactive map of Pangolakha Wildlife Sanctuary
- Location: Pakyong District, Sikkim
- Nearest city: Rangpo
- Coordinates: 27.34°N 88.76°E
- Area: 124 km^{2} (48 sq mi)
- Established: 2002
- Governing body: Government of India, Government of Sikkim

Pangolakha Wildlife Sanctuary is a wildlife sanctuary encompassing an area of 124 km^{2} (48 sq mi) in the Pakyong District of the Indian state of Sikkim. It was established in 2002 and includes the hamlets of Aritar, Dakline Lingtam, Phadamchen, Dzuluk, Gnathang Monastery Kupup. It is about 28 km (17 mi) east of Rorathang and about 40 km (25 mi) by road from Rangpo city.

== Geography ==
Pangolakha Wildlife Sanctuary lies at an elevation of 1,760–4,390 m (5,770–14,400 ft). Pangolakha range in the east separates Sikkim from its eastern neighboring country Bhutan, whereas it is linked through forest patches to the south with Neora Valley National Park in West Bengal. Some high altitude lakes are present there, including Lake Tsongmo, which act as a biodiversity hotspot for migratory birds. Rivers and their tributaries from the north are frozen from December to March; whereas they all flow with an enormous volume of water during the rainy season from mid-April to mid-October. Rangpo River and Jaldhaka River are the major rivers originating from the nearby lakes, which occur in this sanctuary.

== Biodiversity ==
Pangolakha Wildlife Sanctuary supports a large variety of species, since it falls at the junction of the Palearctic realm and the Indomalayan realm. As a biogeographic province, it comes under 2C category.

=== Fauna ===
Birds in Pangolakha Wildlife Sanctuary include kalij pheasant, Oriental honey buzzard, blood pheasant, white-crested laughingthrush, striated laughingthrush, chestnut-crowned laughingthrush, bar-throated minla, red-tailed minla, white-browed shrike babbler, white-browed fulvetta, rufous sibia, whiskered yuhina, stripe-throated yuhina, rufous-vented yuhina, brown dipper, rusty-flanked treecreeper, dark-rumped rosefinch, little bunting. It is also home for some rarities like the speckled wood pigeon and bay woodpecker.

The State Forest Department has set up Eco-Development Committees (EDCs) around all wildlife protected areas. In this IBA, EDCs have been set up in the villages of Mankhim, Dalepchand, Lingtam, Phadamchen, Zuluk and Gnathang.

== See also ==
- Chapramari Wildlife Sanctuary
- Gorumara National Park
- Kyongnosla Alpine Sanctuary
