= Gnathang Monastery =

Religion
- Affiliation: Tibetan Buddhism

Location
- Location: Pakyong District Sikkim, India
- Country: India

Gnathang Monastery is a Gelugpa Buddhist monastery in Sikkim in northeastern India. The monastery is about 100 years old.
