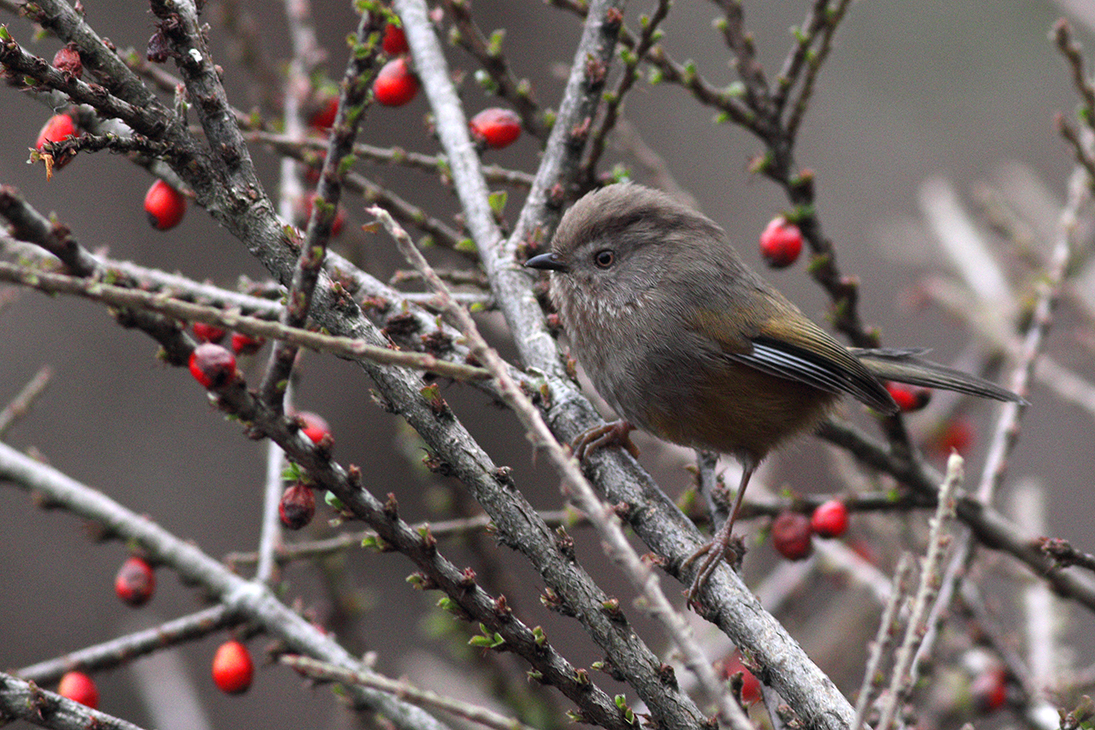
- From Mishmi Hills, Arunachal Pradesh, India

Conservation status
- Least Concern (IUCN 3.1)

Scientific classification
- Kingdom: Animalia
- Phylum: Chordata
- Class: Aves
- Order: Passeriformes
- Family: Paradoxornithidae
- Genus: Fulvetta
- Species: F. manipurensis

Binomial name
- Fulvetta manipurensis (Ogilvie-Grant, 1906)

Synonyms
- Alcippe cinereiceps manipurensis Alcippe manipurensis Fulvetta manipurensis Fulvetta manipurensis manipurensis Proparus manipurensis

= Manipur fulvetta =

Species of bird

The Manipur fulvetta or streak-throated fulvetta (Fulvetta manipurensis) is a bird species in the family Paradoxornithidae. It is named for the state of Manipur in Northeast India. Like the other typical fulvettas, it was long included in the Timaliidae genus Alcippe or in the Sylviidae. In addition, it was long included in F. cinereiceps as a subspecies, and the common name "streak-throated fulvetta" was applied to all these birds. The typical F. cinereiceps are now called grey-hooded fulvetta.

It is found in Northeast India, Myanmar and Yunnan.

Its natural habitat is temperate forest. Its status was first evaluated for the IUCN Red List in 2008, being listed as a Species of Least Concern.

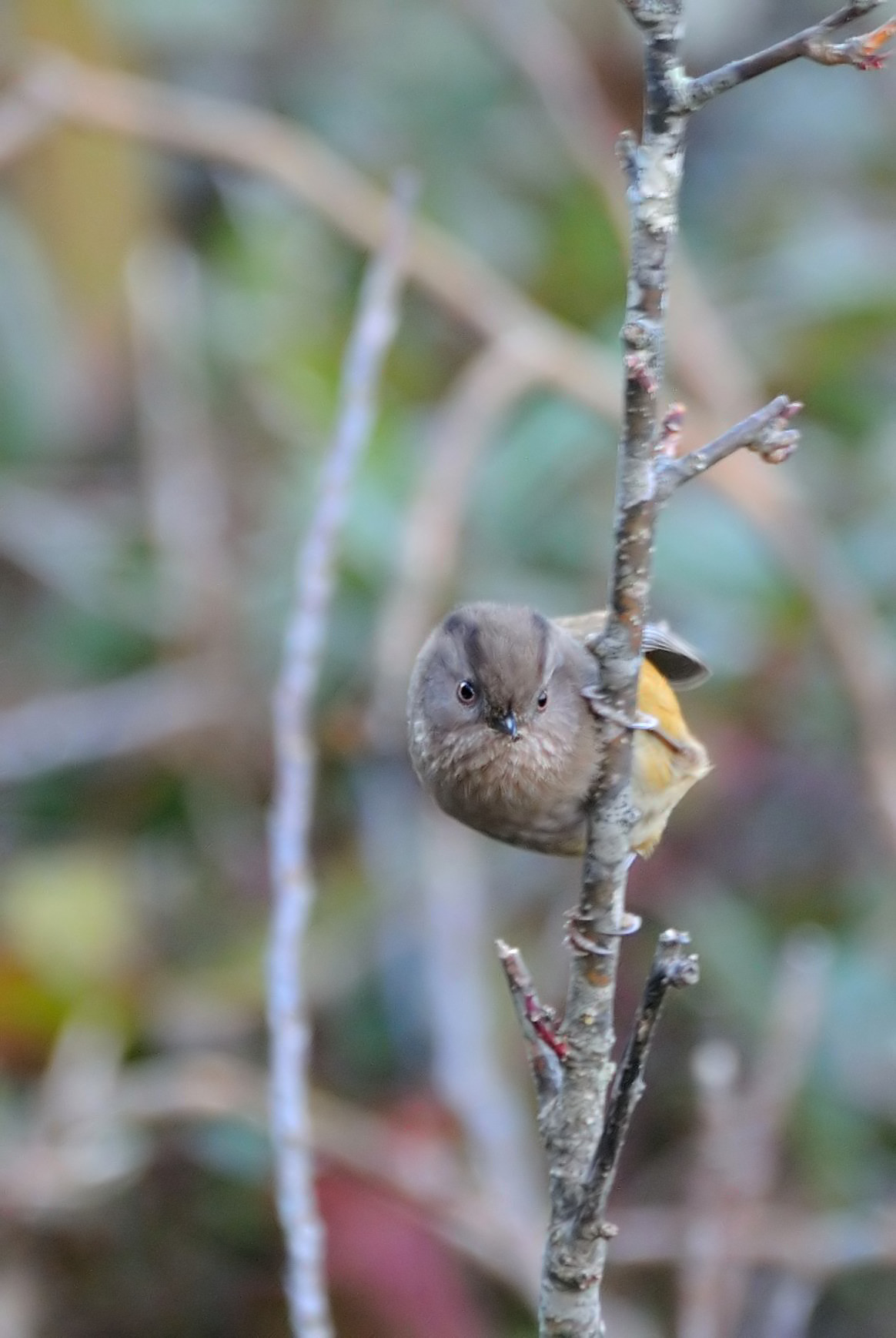
