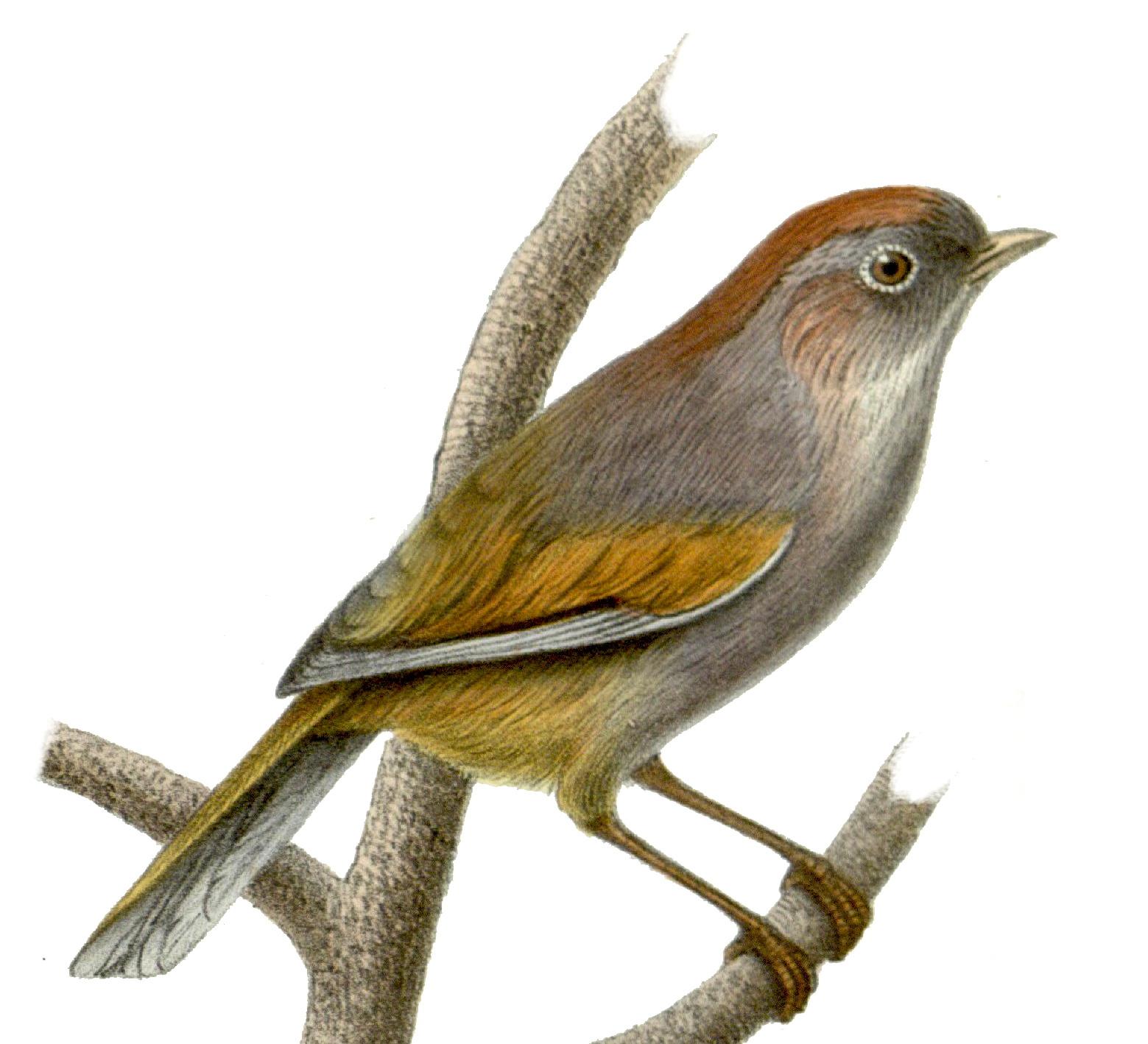

Conservation status
- Least Concern (IUCN 3.1)

Scientific classification
- Kingdom: Animalia
- Phylum: Chordata
- Class: Aves
- Order: Passeriformes
- Family: Paradoxornithidae
- Genus: Fulvetta
- Species: F. ruficapilla

Binomial name
- Fulvetta ruficapilla (Verreaux, J, 1871)

Synonyms
- Alcippe ruficapilla

= Spectacled fulvetta =

Species of bird

The spectacled fulvetta (Fulvetta ruficapilla) is a bird species in the family Paradoxornithidae. Like the other typical fulvettas, it was long included in the Timaliidae genus Alcippe or in the Sylviidae.

It is found in China. Its natural habitat is temperate forests.

== Mating and breeding ==
They breed from March to June. They lay clutches of 2-3 white eggs, which they incubate for 13-14 days in nests made of tree bark, withered stems, hair, thin plastic threads, and plastic sheets. Both parents participate in incubation. The hatchlings nest for 12-14 days. Parents take turns taking care of hatchlings.

== Sources ==
- Collar, N. J. & Robson, C. 2007. Family Timaliidae (Babblers) pp. 70 – 291 in; del Hoyo, J., Elliott, A. & Christie, D.A. eds. Handbook of the Birds of the World, Vol. 12. Picathartes to Tits and Chickadees. Lynx Edicions, Barcelona.
