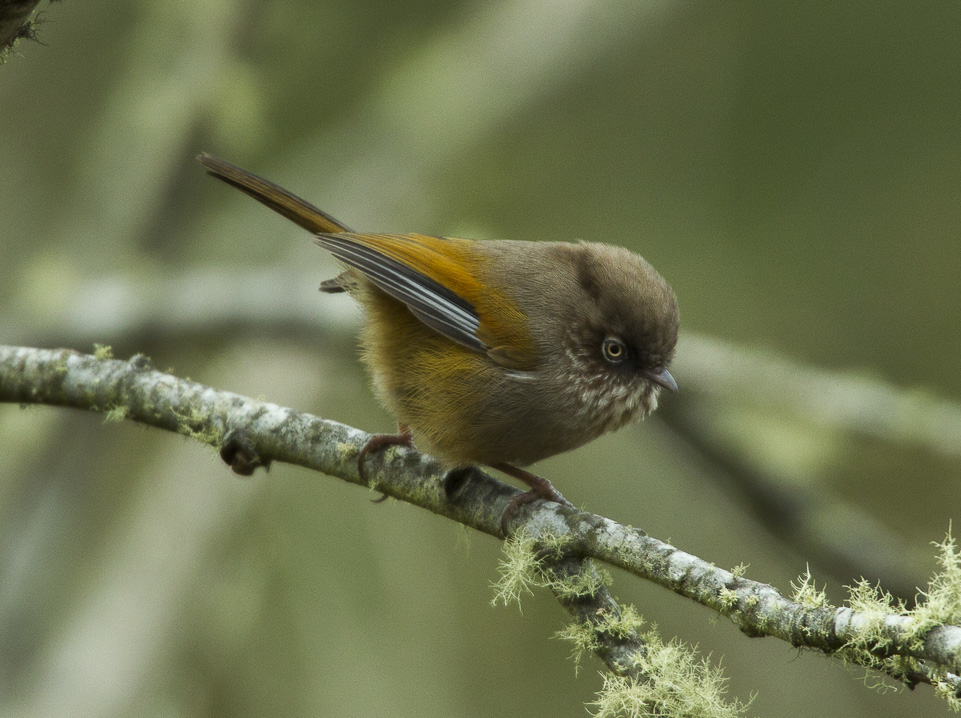

Conservation status
- Least Concern (IUCN 3.1)

Scientific classification
- Kingdom: Animalia
- Phylum: Chordata
- Class: Aves
- Order: Passeriformes
- Family: Paradoxornithidae
- Genus: Fulvetta
- Species: F. formosana

Binomial name
- Fulvetta formosana (Ogilvie-Grant, 1906)

Synonyms
- Alcippe formosana

= Taiwan fulvetta =

Species of bird

The Taiwan fulvetta (Fulvetta formosana) is a species of bird in the family Sylviidae. Like the other typical fulvettas, it was long included in the Timaliidae genus Alcippe. In addition, it was long included in F. cinereiceps as a subspecies.

This species is endemic to Taiwan.
