= Bieti =

Bieti may refer to:

- Black snub-nosed monkey
- Chinese mountain cat
