= Félix Biet =

French missionary and naturalist

His Excellency, The Most Reverend Félix-Marie Biet MEP
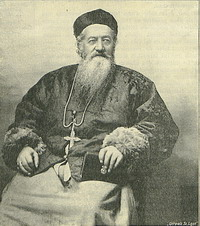
- Church: Catholic Church
- Diocese: Apostolic Vicariate of Tibet
- Installed: 27 August 1878
- Term ended: 9 September 1901
- Predecessor: Joseph-Marie Chauveau
- Successor: Pierre-Philippe Giraudeau
- Other post: Titular Bishop of Diana

Orders
- Consecration: by Annet-Théophile Pinchon

Personal details
- Born: 21 October 1838 Langres, Haute-Marne, France
- Died: 9 September 1901 (aged 62) Saint-Cyr-au-Mont-d'Or, Lyon Metropolis, France
- Occupation: Priest, missionary, entomologist, ornithologist
- Motto: Suaviter et fortiter
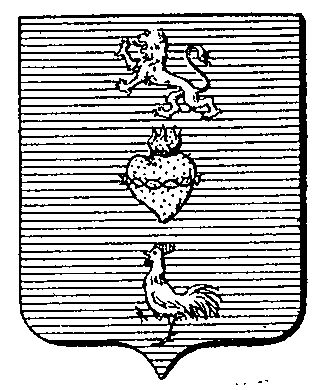
- Coat of arms

Félix Biet, MEP (1838 in Langres, Haute-Marne – 1901 in Saint-Cyr-au-Mont-d'Or) was a French Catholic prelate who served as the Apostolic Vicar of Tibet from 1878 to 1901. He was a member of the Paris Foreign Missions Society and also a naturalist.

== Life ==
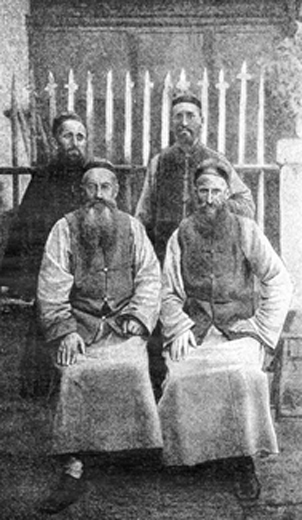
Four Westerners in Tatsienlu, 1890, photographed by Prince Henri of Orléans. From left: Léonard-Louis Déjean, Bishop Félix Biet, the American Tibetologist W.W. Rockhill and André Soulié

Biet was born in 1838. He was ordained as a priest in 1864. He was next sent to Tatsienlu in Tibet (called Dartsedo by Tibetans) as a missionary and he became the Bishop of the Apostolic Vicariate of Thibet, now Diocese of Kangding, in 1898. Félix Biet collected butterflies for Charles Oberthür who dedicated three new species (Thecla bieti, Pantoporia bieti and Anthocharis bieti) to him. Alphonse Milne-Edwards described the Chinese mountain cat (Felis bieti) and the black snub-nosed monkey, (Rhinopithecus bieti), the latter collected and sent by Jean-André Soulié. The Biet's laughingthrush a Chinese endemic species was another discovery, named by Émile Oustalet in 1897. Those natural history collections from Tibet and China are in the National Museum of Natural History in Paris.

He was succeeded by Pierre-Philippe Giraudeau.

== See also ==
- Catholic Church in Sichuan
- Catholic Church in Tibet
