= Small Cat Conservation Alliance =

US-based non-profit organization

Small Cat Conservation Alliance / Small Wild Cat Conservation Foundation
- Founded: 1996
- Founder: Dr. Jim Sanderson
- Type: Non-profit Organization
- Purpose: Environmentalism, Small cat Conservation
- Region served: Kalimantan, (Borneo), Sumatra, Chile, and China
- Website: smallcats.org

The Small Cat Conservation Alliance (SCCA) was founded in 1996, to address the conservation needs of small wild cats and their habitat worldwide. The Small Cat Conservation Alliance seeks out local scientists and volunteers that are working to protect small cats in remote regions worldwide. They collect data that can be used to seek endangered species classification. SCCA operates in Kalimantan (Borneo), Sumatra, Chile, and China; And works with partners in Argentina, Bolivia, Brazil, Cambodia, India, Sarawak, Suriname and Vietnam. The Small Cat Conservation is also partnered with the Wildlife Conservation Network.

In March 2019, on its website (below) the organization calls itself the Small Wild Cat Conservation Foundation.

== Species ==
Out of the 36 feline species, 22 are considered small cat species. The primary priority species that SCCA addresses include:

- African wildcat (Felis silvestris lybica)
- Andean mountain cat (Leopardus jacobita)
- Bornean bay cat (Pardofelis badia)
- Chinese mountain cat (Felis bieti)
- Fishing cat (Prionailurus viverrinus)
- Flat-headed cat (Prionailurus planiceps)
- Guigna (Leopardus guigna)
- Leopard cat (Prionailurus bengalensis)
- Marbled cat (Pardofelis marmorata)
- Margay (Leopardus wiedii)
- Rusty-spotted cat (Prionailurus rubiginosus)

== Programs ==
=== Camera traps ===
Cameras are set up to photograph anything that passes in the area to gain information of the population, behaviors and activities of small cats and those that share their territory. In 2007 SCCA captured the first photograph of a Chinese mountain cat in the wild.

=== Radio collars ===
Small cats are fitted with radio collars to help study their range and behaviors including contact with humans.

=== Local resources ===
Local conservationists and scientists are sought after for conservation planning of targeted species and their habitat.

== See also ==
- Conservation movement
- Natural environment
