= Faecalibacter rhinopitheci =

Scientific classification
- Domain: Bacteria
- Kingdom: Pseudomonadati
- Phylum: Bacteroidota
- Class: Flavobacteriia
- Order: Flavobacteriales
- Family: Flavobacteriaceae
- Genus: Faecalibacter
- Species: F. rhinopitheci

Binomial name
- Faecalibacter rhinopitheci Wang et al. 2021

Type strain
- WQ 117T

Species of bacterium

Faecalibacter rhinopitheci is a Gram-negative bacterium from the genus of Faecalibacter which has been isolated from faeces of a Black-and-white snub-nosed monkey from the National Park in Yunnan.
