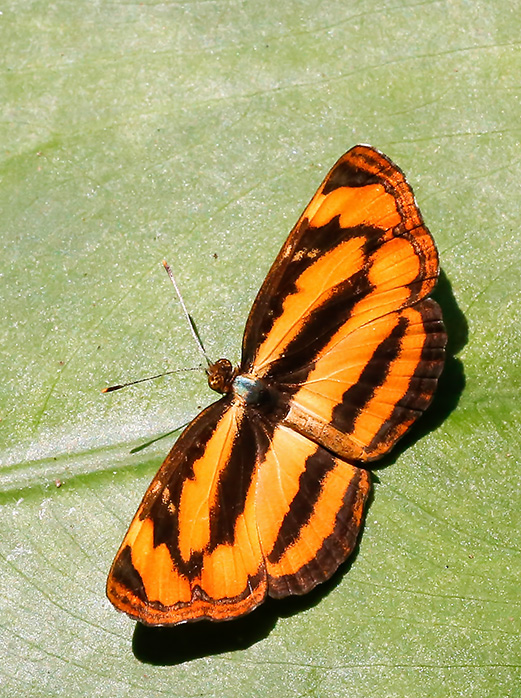

Scientific classification
- Kingdom: Animalia
- Phylum: Arthropoda
- Class: Insecta
- Order: Lepidoptera
- Family: Nymphalidae
- Genus: Pantoporia
- Species: P. sandaka

Binomial name
- Pantoporia sandaka (Butler, 1892)

= Pantoporia sandaka =

Extra lascar

Species of butterfly

Pantoporia sandaka, the extra lascar, is a species of nymphalid butterfly found in tropical and subtropical Asia.

== Subspecies ==
The subspecies of Pantoporia sandaka are-

- Pantoporia sandaka sandaka Eliot, 1969 – (Peninsular Malaya, Sumatra, Bangka, Pulo Laut, Borneo)
- Pantoporia sandaka davidsoni Eliot, 1969 – (India - Thailand - Hainan, Burma)
- Pantoporia sandaka ferrari Eliot, 1969 – (Andaman Is.)
- Pantoporia sandaka michaeli Tsukada & Kaneko, 1985

== Food plants ==
The larvae feed on Acacia caesia and Dalbergia horrida.
