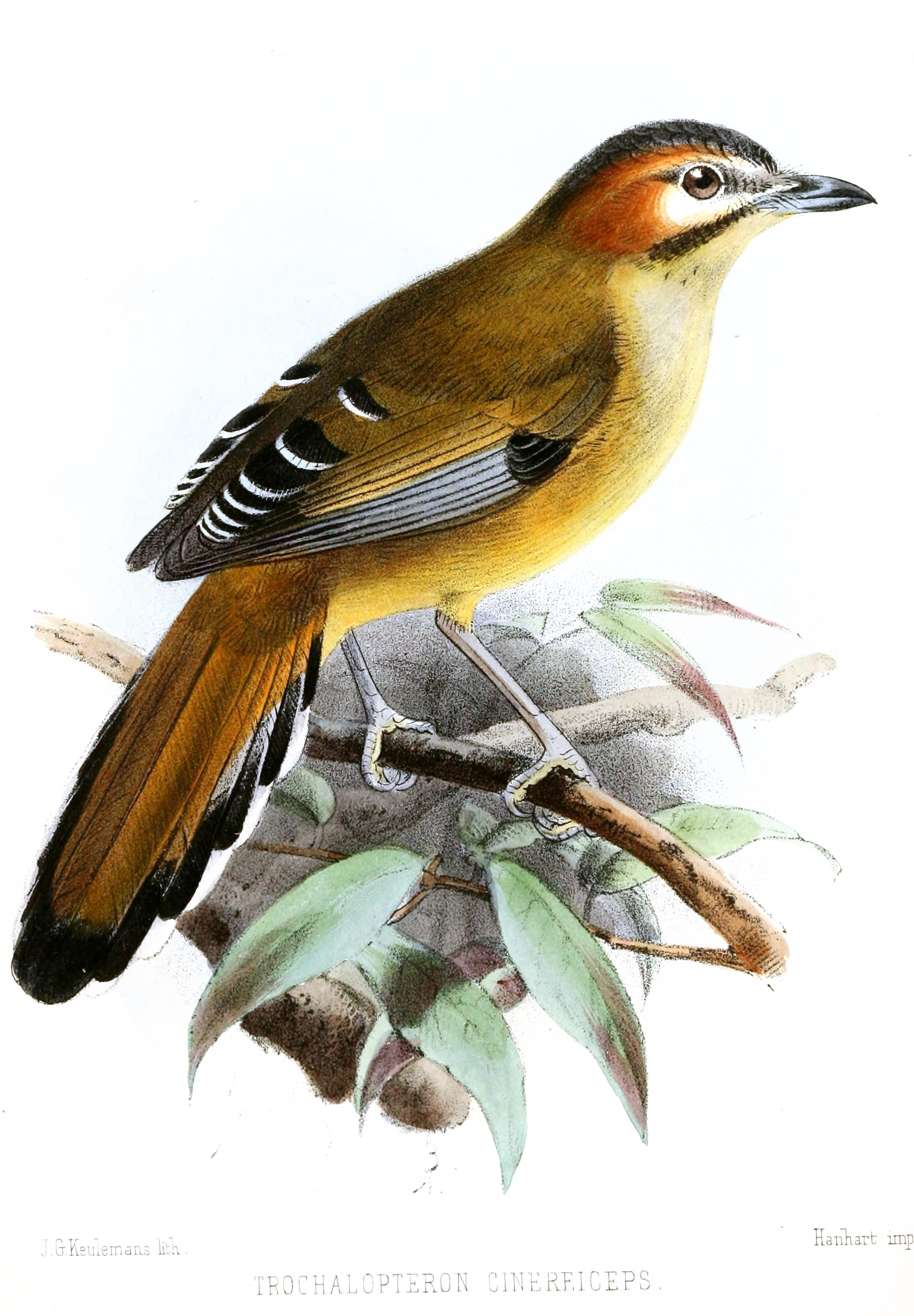

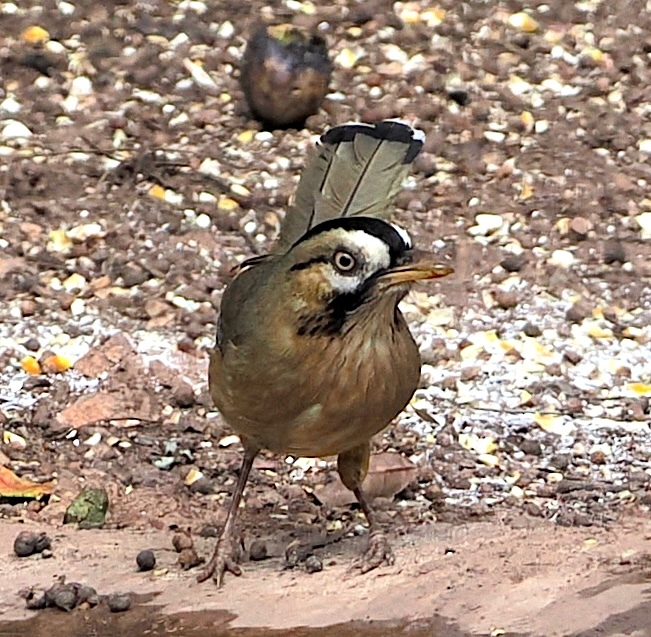

Conservation status
- Least Concern (IUCN 3.1)

Scientific classification
- Kingdom: Animalia
- Phylum: Chordata
- Class: Aves
- Order: Passeriformes
- Family: Leiothrichidae
- Genus: Ianthocincla
- Species: I. cineracea

Binomial name
- Ianthocincla cineracea (Godwin-Austen, 1874)

Synonyms
- Garrulax cineraceus

= Moustached laughingthrush =

Species of bird

The moustached laughingthrush (Ianthocincla cineracea) is a species of passerine bird in the family Leiothrichidae. It is found in China, India, and Myanmar where its natural habitat is subtropical or tropical moist montane forests.

The moustached laughingthrush was at one time placed in the genus Garrulax but following the publication of a comprehensive molecular phylogenetic study in 2018, it was moved to the resurrected genus Ianthocincla.

== Subspecies ==
Three subspecies are recognised:

- Ianthocincla cineracea cineracea (Godwin-Austen, 1874) – Purvanchal Range
- Ianthocincla cineracea strenua (Deignan, 1957) – east Myanmar to Yunnan
- Ianthocincla cineracea cinereiceps (Styan, 1887) – South China
