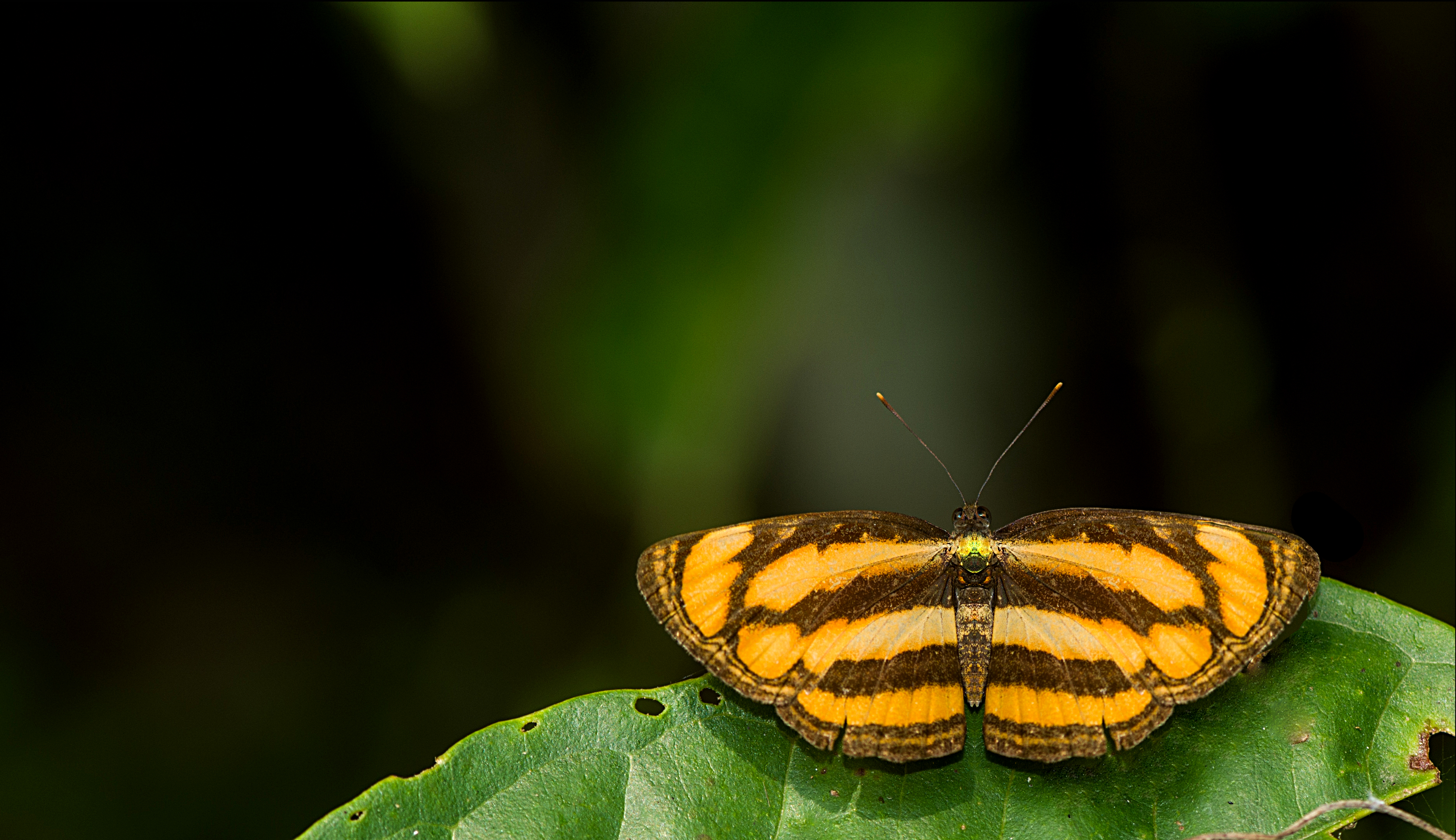
- From the Garo Hills of Meghalaya, India

Scientific classification
- Kingdom: Animalia
- Phylum: Arthropoda
- Class: Insecta
- Order: Lepidoptera
- Family: Nymphalidae
- Genus: Pantoporia
- Species: P. paraka

Binomial name
- Pantoporia paraka (Butler, 1879)

= Pantoporia paraka =

Perak lascar

Species of butterfly

Pantoporia paraka, the Perak lascar, is a species of nymphalid butterfly found in tropical and subtropical Asia.
