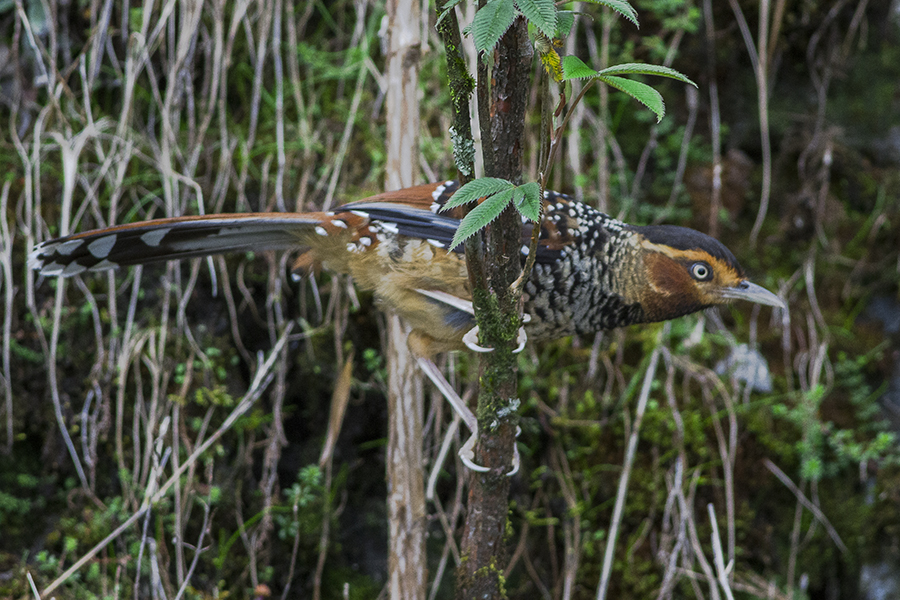
- Ianthocincla ocellata ocellata from Pangolakha WLS, East Sikkim, India.

Conservation status
- Least Concern (IUCN 3.1)

Scientific classification
- Kingdom: Animalia
- Phylum: Chordata
- Class: Aves
- Order: Passeriformes
- Family: Leiothrichidae
- Genus: Ianthocincla
- Species: I. ocellata

Binomial name
- Ianthocincla ocellata (Vigors, 1831)

Synonyms
- Garrulax ocellatus

= Spotted laughingthrush =

Species of bird

The spotted laughingthrush (Ianthocincla ocellata) is a bird species in the family Leiothrichidae. It is found in Bhutan, China, India, Myanmar, and Nepal. Its natural habitat is subtropical or tropical moist montane forests.

The spotted laughingthrush was at one time placed in the genus Garrulax but following the publication of a comprehensive molecular phylogenetic study in 2018, it was moved to the resurrected genus Ianthocincla.

== Gallery ==
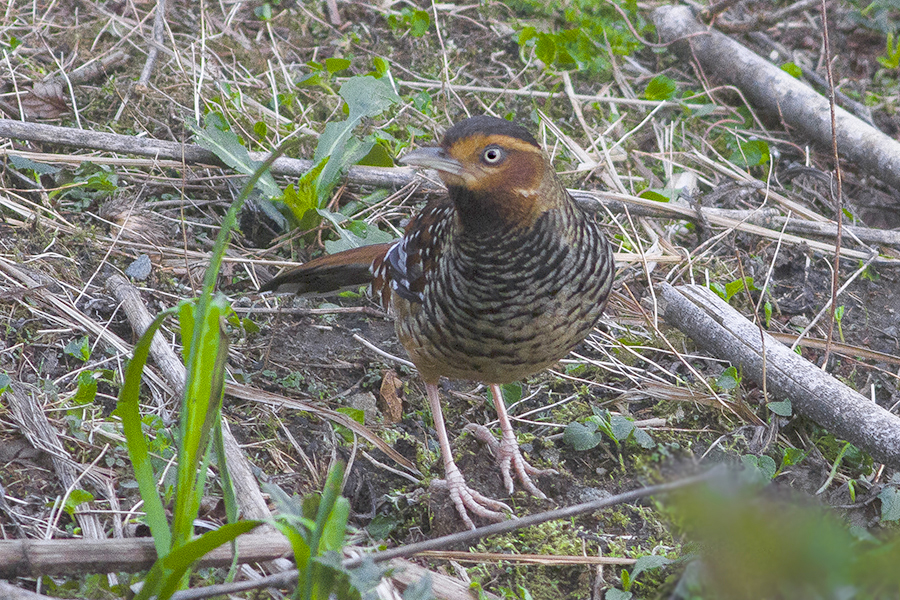
Pangolakha Wildlife Sanctuary, East Sikkim

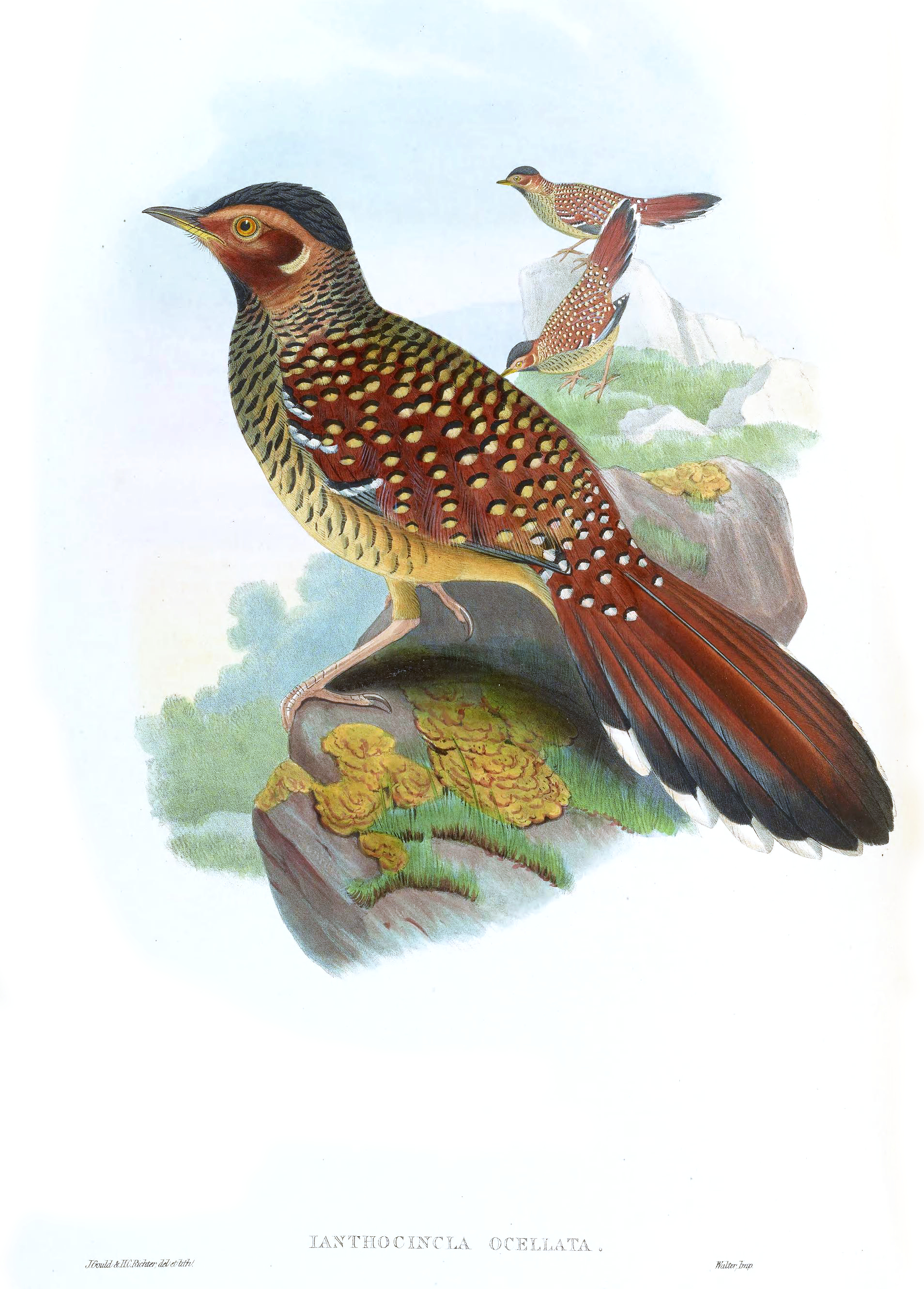
Artist's Illustration

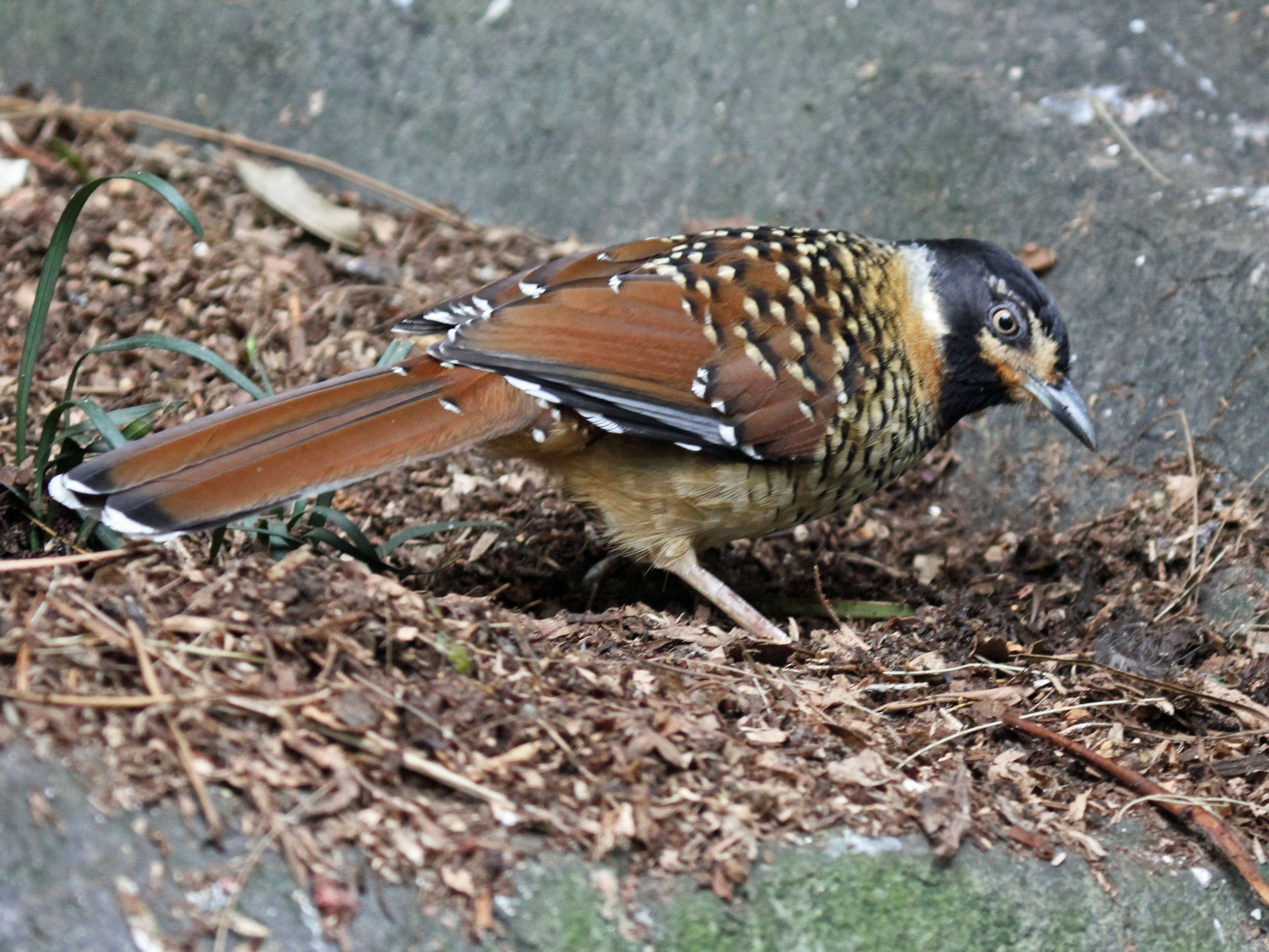
San Diego Zoo

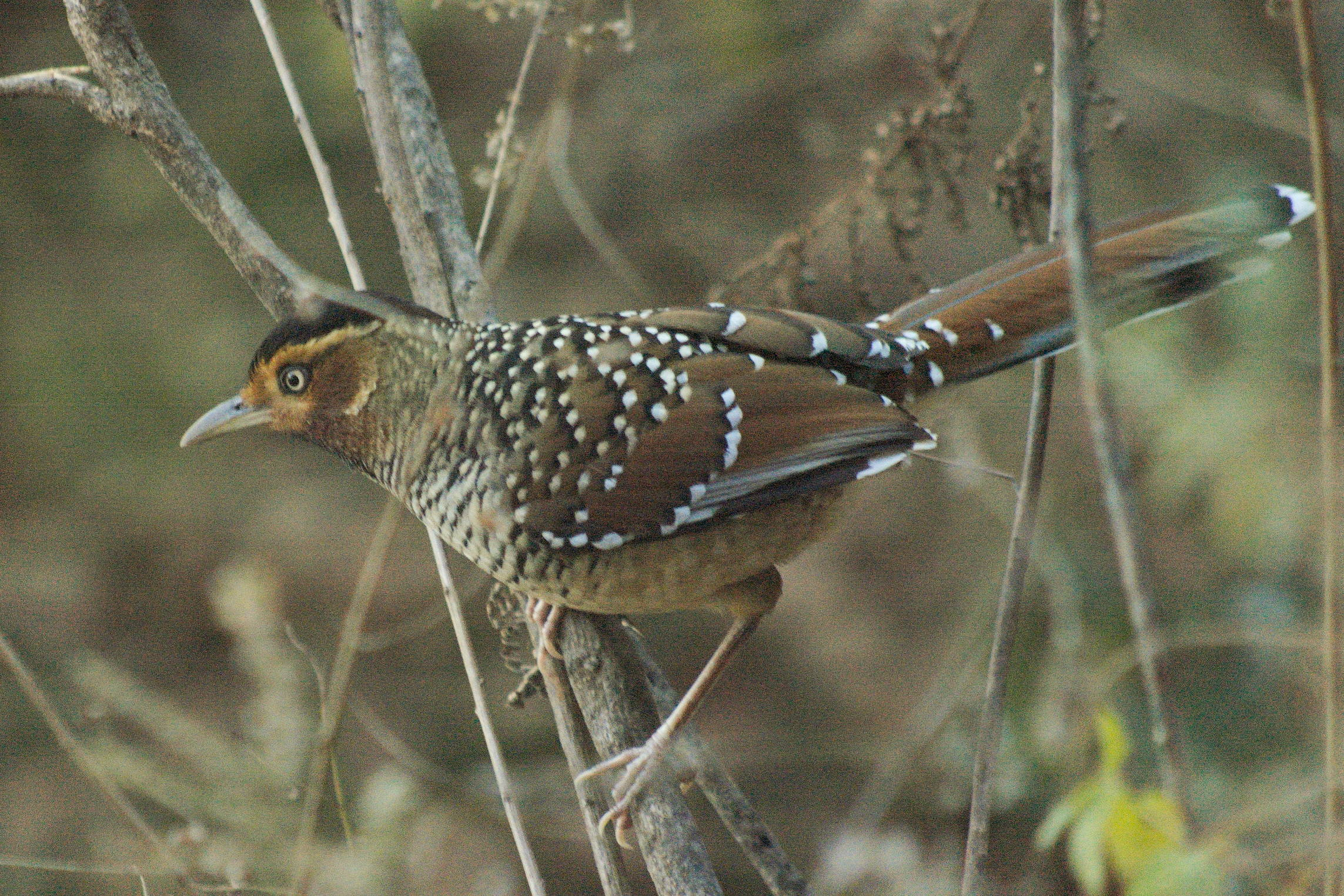
Spotted laughingthrush (Ianthocincla ocellata) in undergrowth of a mixed cold temperate Himalayan Forest, about 2250 meters above sea level, in Sarmoli Village, Munsiari, District Pithoragarh, Uttarakhand.
