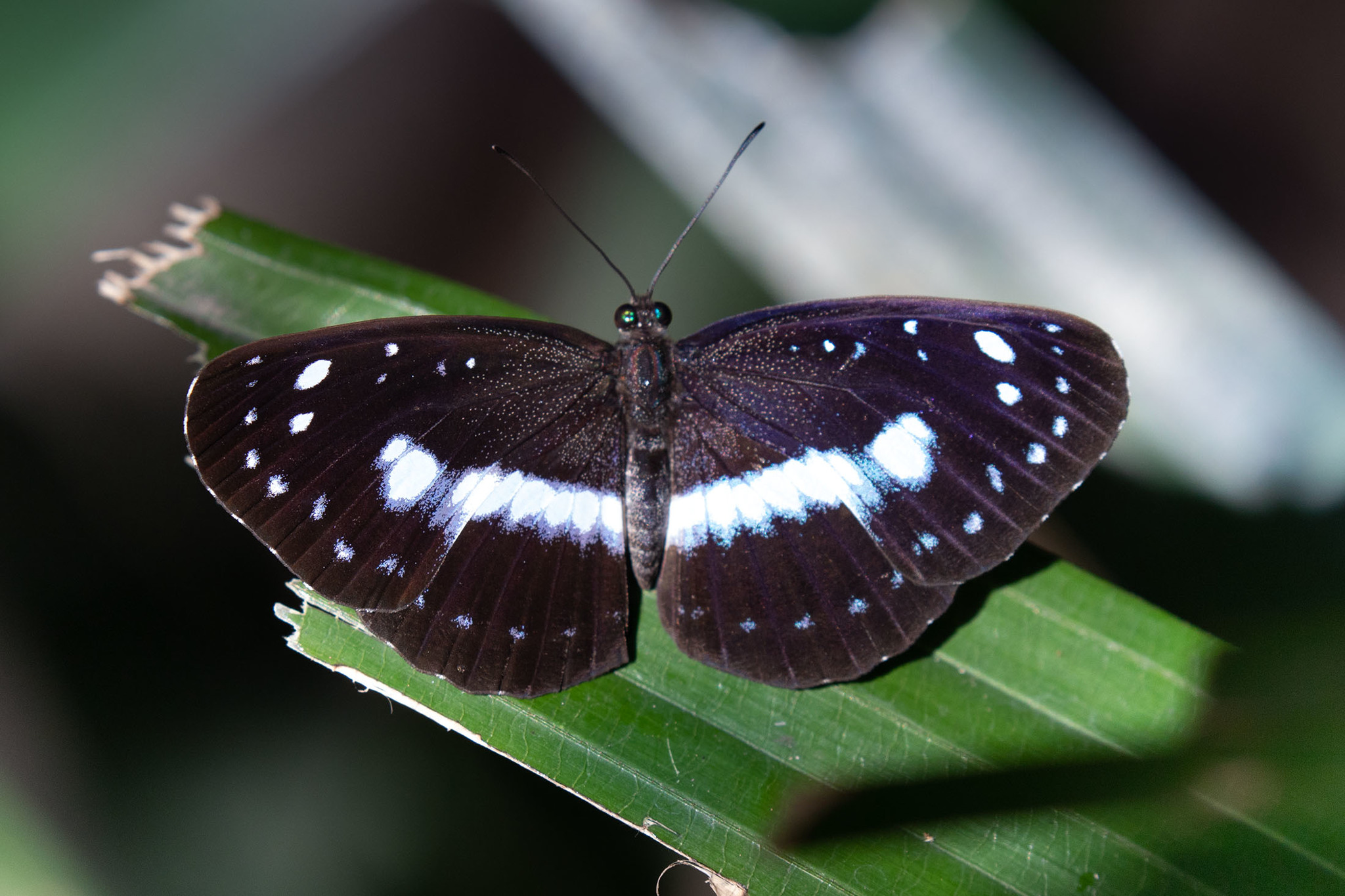

Scientific classification
- Kingdom: Animalia
- Phylum: Arthropoda
- Class: Insecta
- Order: Lepidoptera
- Family: Nymphalidae
- Genus: Pantoporia
- Species: P. venilia

Binomial name
- Pantoporia venilia (Linnaeus, 1758)

Synonyms
- Papilio venilia Linnaeus, 1758; Acca venilia (Linnaeus, 1758); Neptis venilia (Linnaeus, 1758); Hamadryas moorei Macleay, 1866; Neptis mortifacies Butler, 1875; Neptis ganina Grose-Smith, 1894; Acca obiana Swinhoe, 1904; Neptis anceps Grose-Smith, 1894; Neptis cyanifera Butler, 1878

= Pantoporia venilia =

Species of butterfly

Pantoporia venilia, the Cape York aeroplane or black-eyed plane, is a butterfly of the family Nymphalidae. It is found in Australia (Queensland), Indonesia, Papua New Guinea and surrounding islands.

The wingspan is about 40 mm.

Larvae have been found on Lepidopetalum subdichotomum.

== Subspecies ==
- Pantoporia venilia venilia (Ambon, Serang, Geser, Banda Islands)
- Pantoporia venilia evanescens (Staudinger, 1888) (Bachan, Halmahera, Morotai, Ternate)
- Pantoporia venilia godelewa (Fruhstorfer, 1908) (Buru)
- Pantoporia venilia tadema (Fruhstorfer, 1908) (Waigeu, Misool, Gebe Islands)
- Pantoporia venilia holargyrea (Fruhstorfer, 1908) (Aru, Kai, Tanimbar)
- Pantoporia venilia pseudovenilia (Fruhstorfer, 1908) (Roon Island, north-west West Irian)
- Pantoporia venilia anceps (Grose-Smith, 1894) (Jobi Island, West Irian)
- Pantoporia venilia cyanifera (Butler, 1878) (Papua, Yule Island)
- Pantoporia venilia glyceria (Fruhstorfer, 1908) (D'Entrecasteaux Archipelago, Trobriand, Woodlark Island)
- Pantoporia venilia louisa Eliot, 1969 (Louisiade Archipelago)
- Pantoporia venilia dampierensis (Rothschild, 1915) (Karkar Island)
- Pantoporia venilia albopunctata (Joicey & Noakes, 1915) (Biak, Noemfoor Island)
- Pantoporia venilia moorei (Macleay, 1866) (Cape York to Cairns)
- Pantoporia venilia novohannoverana (Pagenstecher, 1899) (Bismarck Archipelago)
- Pantoporia venilia mysolensis (Rothschild, 1915) (Misol)
