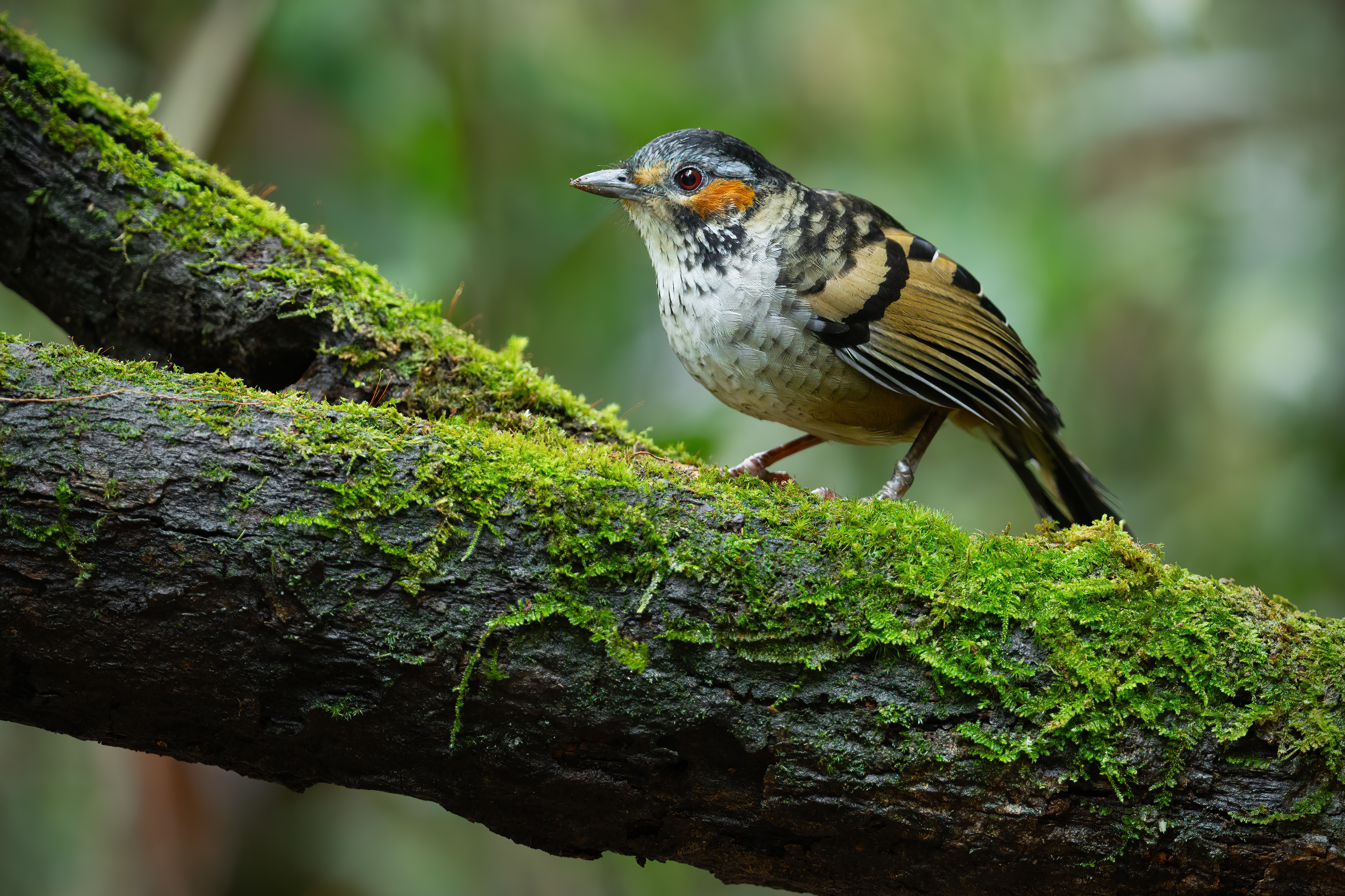

Conservation status
- Vulnerable (IUCN 3.1)

Scientific classification
- Kingdom: Animalia
- Phylum: Chordata
- Class: Aves
- Order: Passeriformes
- Family: Leiothrichidae
- Genus: Ianthocincla
- Species: I. konkakinhensis

Binomial name
- Ianthocincla konkakinhensis (Eames, J.C. & Eames, C., 2001)

Synonyms
- Garrulax konkakinhensis (protonym)

= Chestnut-eared laughingthrush =

Species of bird

The chestnut-eared laughingthrush (Ianthocincla konkakinhensis) is a species of bird in the family Leiothrichidae. It is found in Vietnam and possibly Laos.

This species measures 22 cm (8.7 in). This laughingthrush has boldly and irregularly barred black and white upperparts, a black-streaked grey forehead, chestnut ear-coverts, and a white-tipped tail with a broad black sub-terminal band.

Endemic to Kon Tum Province, Vietnam, the only known site for this species is a small area in Kon Ka Kinh National Park (which is also the origin of the species' scientific name). Its natural habitat is subtropical or tropical moist montane forests. It is threatened by habitat loss.

The chestnut-eared laughingthrush was originally placed in the genus Garrulax but following the publication of a comprehensive molecular phylogenetic study in 2018, it was moved to the resurrected genus Ianthocincla.
