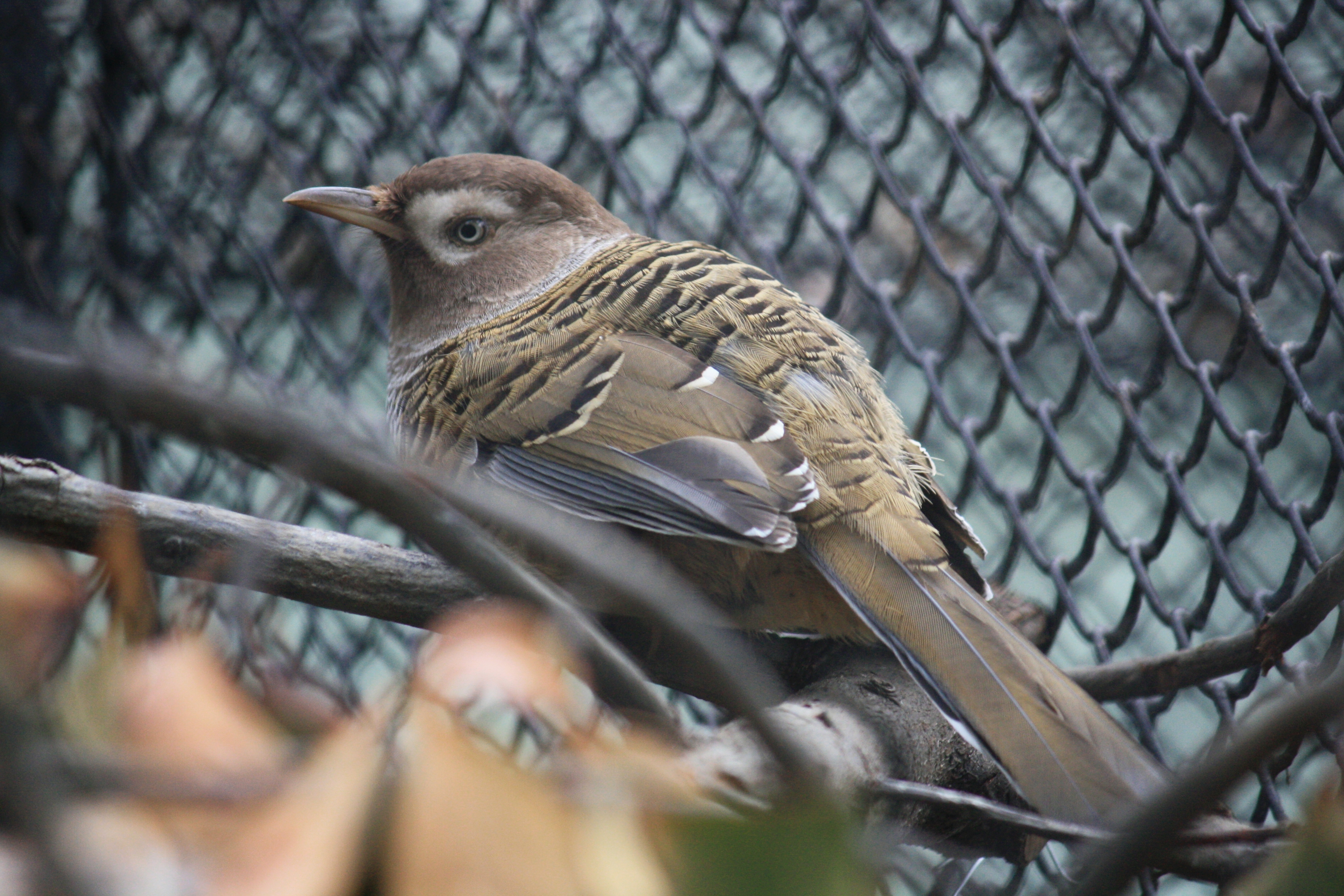

Conservation status
- Least Concern (IUCN 3.1)

Scientific classification
- Kingdom: Animalia
- Phylum: Chordata
- Class: Aves
- Order: Passeriformes
- Family: Leiothrichidae
- Genus: Ianthocincla
- Species: I. lunulata

Binomial name
- Ianthocincla lunulata Verreaux, 1871

Synonyms
- Garrulax lunulatus; Janthocincla lunulata

= Barred laughingthrush =

Species of bird

The barred laughingthrush (Ianthocincla lunulata) is a passerine bird in the family Leiothrichidae. It is endemic to central China where its natural habitat is temperate forests.

The barred laughingthrush was at one time placed in the genus Garrulax but following the publication of a comprehensive molecular phylogenetic study in 2018, it was moved to the resurrected genus Ianthocincla.
