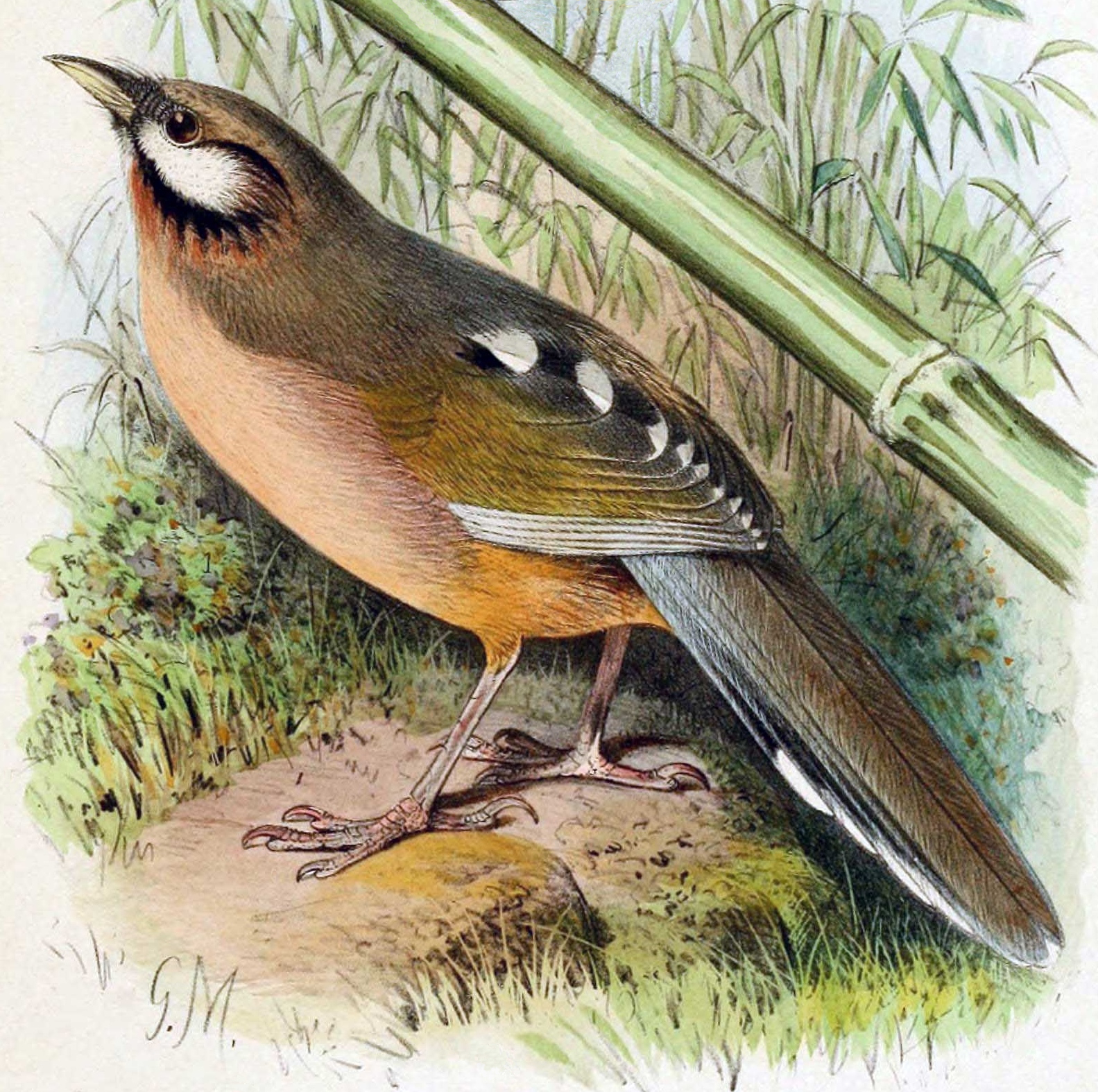

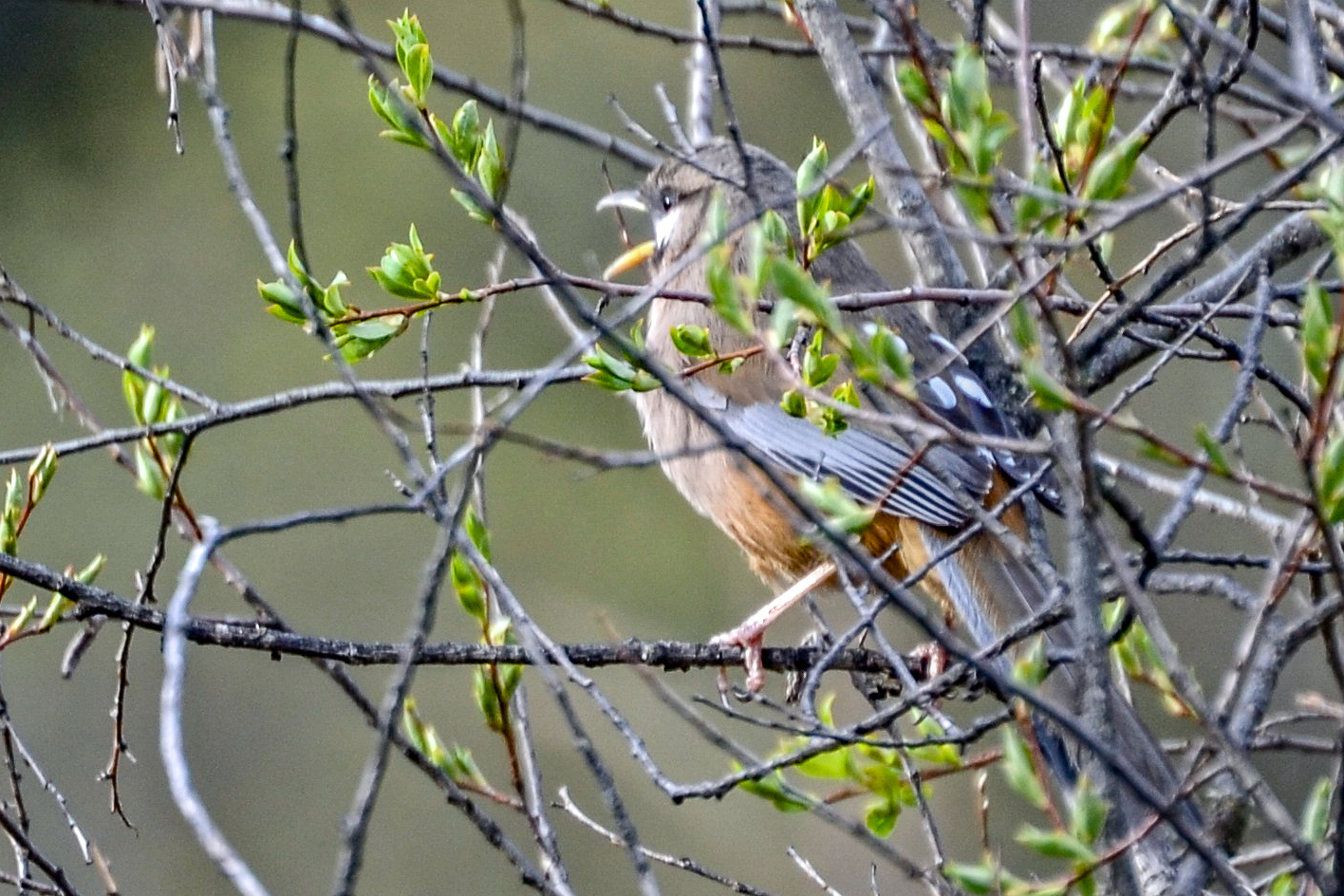

Conservation status
- Vulnerable (IUCN 3.1)

Scientific classification
- Kingdom: Animalia
- Phylum: Chordata
- Class: Aves
- Order: Passeriformes
- Family: Leiothrichidae
- Genus: Ianthocincla
- Species: I. sukatschewi

Binomial name
- Ianthocincla sukatschewi (Berezowski & Bianchi, 1891)

Synonyms
- Garrulax sukatschewi

= Snowy-cheeked laughingthrush =

Species of bird

The snowy-cheeked laughingthrush (Ianthocincla sukatschewi), also known as Sukatschev's laughingthrush, is a species of bird in the family Leiothrichidae. It is endemic to northern China where its natural habitat is temperate forests. It is threatened by habitat loss.

The snowy-cheeked laughingthrush was at one time placed in the genus Garrulax but following the publication of a comprehensive molecular phylogenetic study in 2018, it was moved to the resurrected genus Ianthocincla. The specific name honours the Russian merchant, philanthropist and collector Vladimir Platonovich Sukachev (1849-1919).
