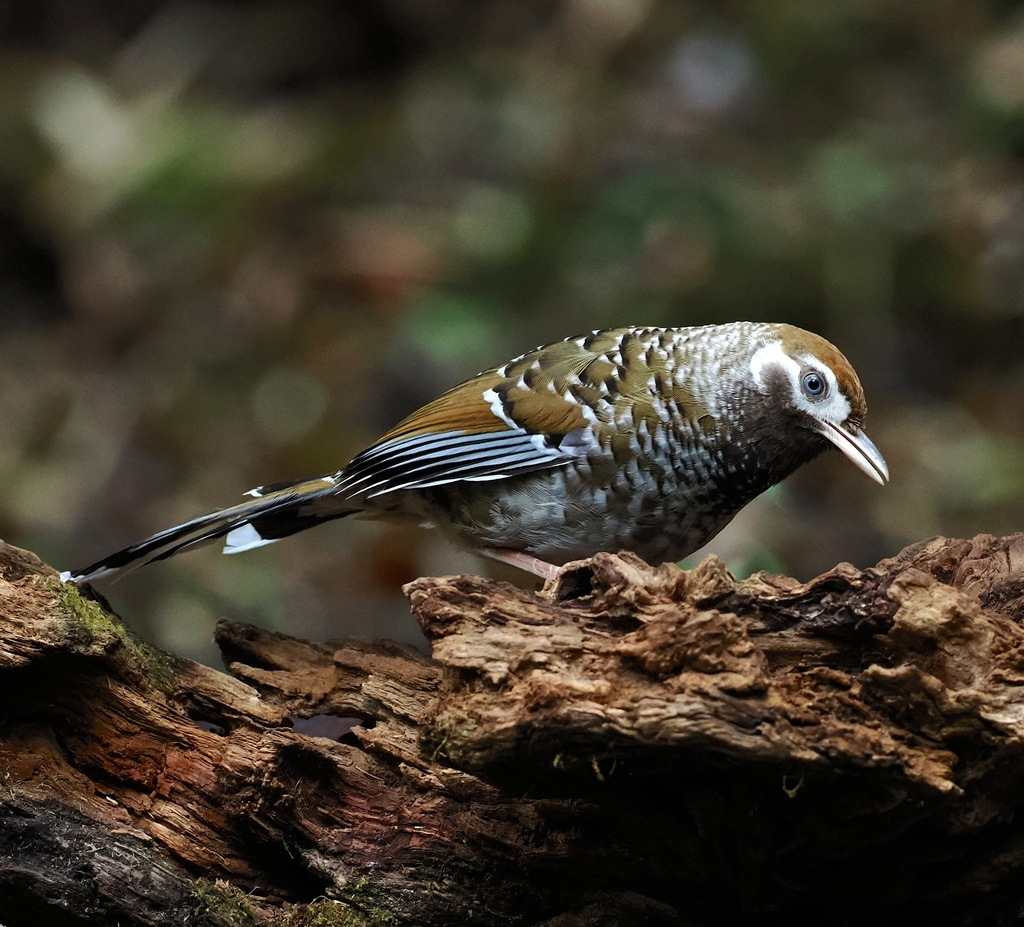

Conservation status
- Vulnerable (IUCN 3.1)

Scientific classification
- Kingdom: Animalia
- Phylum: Chordata
- Class: Aves
- Order: Passeriformes
- Family: Leiothrichidae
- Genus: Ianthocincla
- Species: I. bieti

Binomial name
- Ianthocincla bieti Oustalet, 1897

Synonyms
- Garrulax bieti

= White-speckled laughingthrush =

Species of bird

The white-speckled laughingthrush (Ianthocincla bieti), also known as Biet's Laughingthrush, is a species of passerine bird in the family Leiothrichidae. It is endemic to China. Its natural habitat is temperate forests. It is threatened by habitat loss.

The white-speckled laughingthrush was at one time placed in the genus Garrulax but following the publication of a comprehensive molecular phylogenetic study in 2018, it was moved to the resurrected genus Ianthocincla. The specific name commemorates the French missionary to China Félix Biet.
