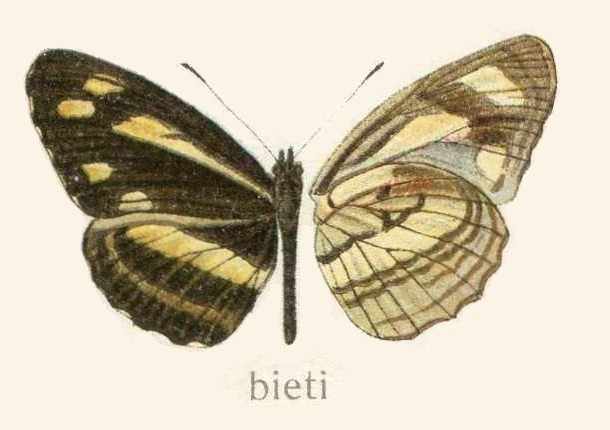
- Upperside on left, underside right, from Adalbert Seitz

Scientific classification
- Kingdom: Animalia
- Phylum: Arthropoda
- Class: Insecta
- Order: Lepidoptera
- Family: Nymphalidae
- Genus: Pantoporia
- Species: P. bieti

Binomial name
- Pantoporia bieti (Oberthür, 1894)

= Pantoporia bieti =

Tytler's lascar

Species of butterfly

Pantoporia bieti, the Tytler's lascar, is a species of nymphalid butterfly found in tropical and subtropical Asia. The species is named in recognition of Félix Biet a French missionary who collected butterflies for Charles Oberthur.
