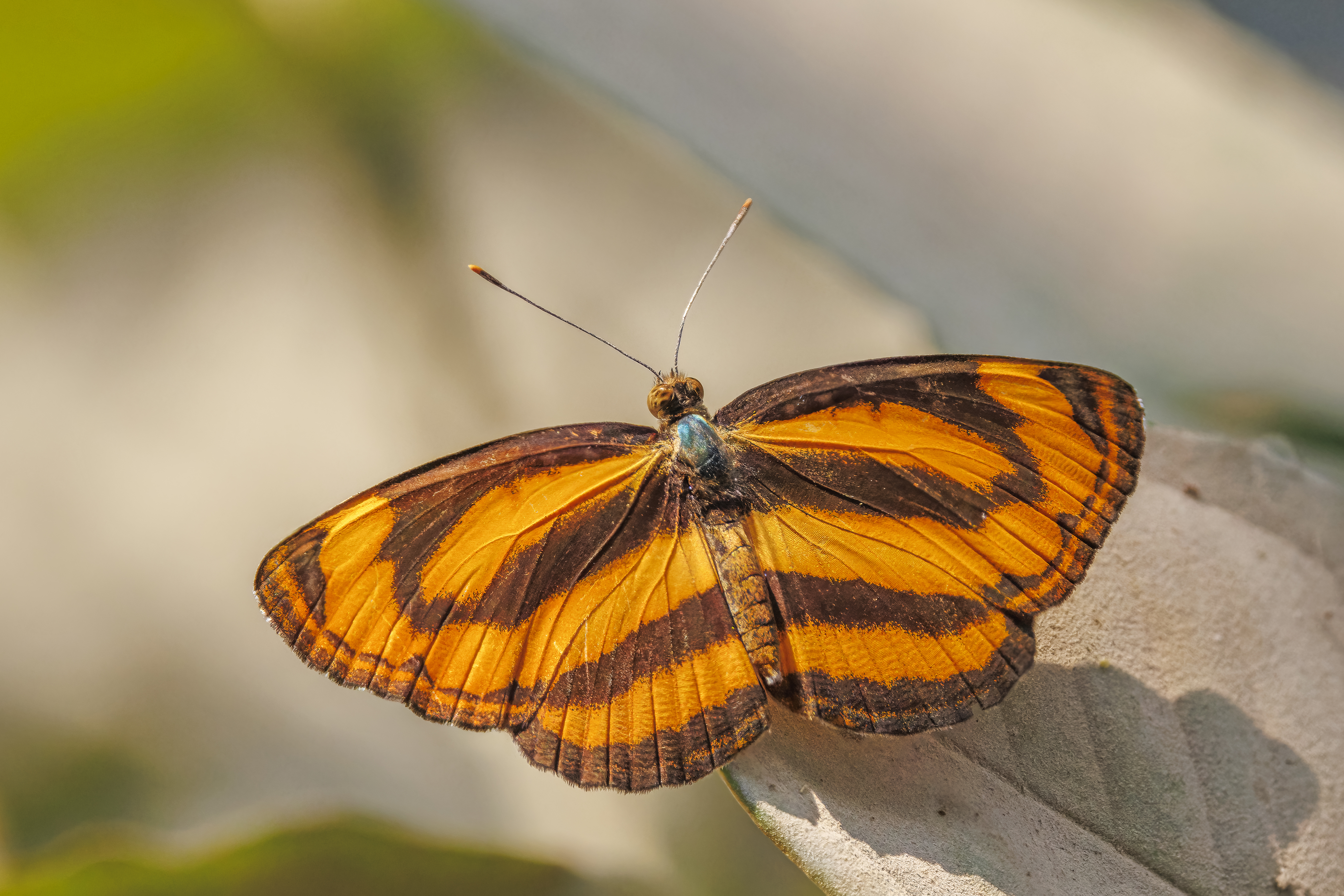
- in Laos

Scientific classification
- Kingdom: Animalia
- Phylum: Arthropoda
- Class: Insecta
- Order: Lepidoptera
- Family: Nymphalidae
- Genus: Pantoporia
- Species: P. hordonia

Binomial name
- Pantoporia hordonia (Stoll, 1790)

Synonyms
- Rahinda hordonia

= Pantoporia hordonia =

Common lascar

Species of butterfly

Pantoporia hordonia, the common lascar, is a species of nymphalid butterfly found in Cambodia, tropical and subtropical Asia.

== Description ==
=== Wet-season form ===
Both male and female have upperside black with orange markings. Forewing: discoidal streak broad, anteriorly twice indented, at apex extending into base of interspace 3; posterior discal spots coalescent, forming an irregular oblique short broad band; anterior spots also coalescent, oblique from costa; a postdiscal obscure grey incurved transverse line, and a very slender, also obscure, orange transverse subterminal line. Hindwing: a subbasal transverse broad band, and a much narrower postdiscal band curved inwards at the ends; beyond this the black terminal margin is traversed by a darker black subterminal line. Underside chestnut-brown, covered with short, slender, transverse brown striae on the margin of the orange markings, which are similar to those on the upperside but broader, paler, and less clearly defined. Forewing: the pale transverse postdiscal and orange subterminal lines of the upperside replaced by a postdiscal lilacine narrow band, defined by somewhat crenulate chestnut-brown lines on each side, and a pale subterminal line. Hindwing: the base suffused with lilacine; the subbasal and postdiscal bands bordered outwardly by narrow lilacine bands, the orange-yellow of the postdiscal band much obscured by the transverse brown strife; the terminal margin with a sinuous obscure broad lilacine line. Antennae, head, thorax and abdomen are black; beneath, the palpi and thorax greyish, abdomen ochraceous.

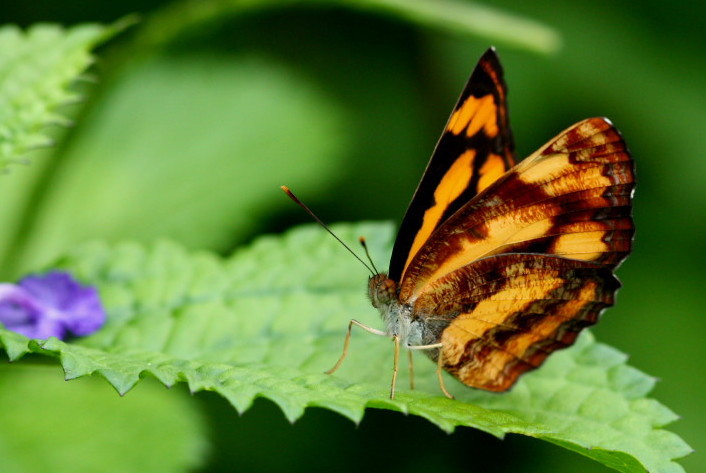
Underside

=== Dry-season form ===
Males and females are similar to the wet-season form, but the markings are very much broader; on the upperside of the forewing the postdiscal line generally and the subterminal line always clearly defined, the former sometimes like the latter, orange-yellow, Underside paler, the markings more blurred, the transverse short brown striae in many specimens covering nearly the whole surface of the wings.

Expanse: 38–44 mm

Race sinuata Moore (restricted to Sri Lanka) is a slightly differentiated island form. It differs constantly from the typical form in the margins of the discal markings (especially the outer margins) on the upperside of the forewing and the margins of the subbasal and postdiscal bands of the hindwing being more sinuous.

== Distribution ==
Continental India, from the Himalayas to the Western Ghats; Assam; Burma; Tenasserim, extending into the Malayan sub-region.

== Larva ==
"Has two forms. In the first the head is large and roughly triangular, the segments of the body increase to the fourth and then diminish gradually, and the third, fourth, sixth, and twelfth have each two obtuse dorsal points. The fore part from the fourth segment is generally inclined downwards at an angle with the rest of the body and is with the underpays of a dark greenish-brown colour. The rest is just that shade of greenish-grey which the leaves assume when withered, and is crossed by diagonal dark bands exactly representing the spaces between the leaflets as a painter would paint them – a most perfect disguise. The second form of the larva differs in having the head furcate, while the dorsal points are replaced by long spine-like processes. The figure will give a better idea of the difference than any description ... The butterfly resulting from the larva with spines has a light male-mark; that resulting from the other a dark male-mark ... The two forms of larva are never found together; the smooth type of caterpillar is often found in quantities on one bush ... the smooth caterpillar feeds on Acacia and Albizzia, the spined one has never been found on any plant but Acacia."(Davidson, Bell and Aitken)
