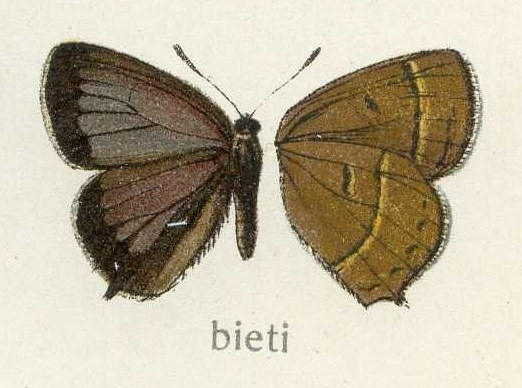
- Upperside on left, underside on right

Scientific classification
- Kingdom: Animalia
- Phylum: Arthropoda
- Clade: Pancrustacea
- Class: Insecta
- Order: Lepidoptera
- Family: Lycaenidae
- Genus: Esakiozephyrus
- Species: E. bieti

Binomial name
- Esakiozephyrus bieti (Oberthür, 1886)

= Esakiozephyrus bieti =

Indian purple hairstreak

Species of butterfly

Esakiozephyrus bieti, the Indian purple hairstreak, is a small butterfly found in India that belongs to the lycaenids or blues family.

== Taxonomy ==
The butterfly was previously classified as Thecla bieti de Nicéville.

== Range ==
The butterfly occurs in India from Kulu to Garhwal, Sikkim to Bhutan. It is also found in China, Tibet, and north west Yunnan.

== Status ==
In 1932 William Harry Evans described the species as rare and very rare in Kumaon.

== Etymology ==
Charles Oberthür dedicated the species to missionary and naturalist Félix Biet.

== See also ==
- List of butterflies of India (Lycaenidae)
