= Faecalibacter bovis =

Scientific classification
- Domain: Bacteria
- Kingdom: Pseudomonadati
- Phylum: Bacteroidota
- Class: Flavobacteriia
- Order: Flavobacteriales
- Family: Flavobacteriaceae
- Genus: Faecalibacter
- Species: F. bovis

Binomial name
- Faecalibacter bovis Li et al. 2021

Type strain
- ZY171143

Species of bacterium

Faecalibacter bovis is a Gram-negative, aerobic, non-spore-forming, rod-shaped and pleomorphic bacterium from the genus of Faecalibacter which has been isolated from cow faeces.
