= Faecalibacter =

Scientific classification
- Domain: Bacteria
- Kingdom: Pseudomonadati
- Phylum: Bacteroidota
- Class: Flavobacteriia
- Order: Flavobacteriales
- Family: Flavobacteriaceae
- Genus: Faecalibacter; Chen et al. 2020

Type species
- Faecalibacter macacae

Species
- F. bovis F. macacae F. rhinopitheci

Genus of bacteria

Faecalibacter is a genus of bacteria from the family of Flavobacteriaceae.
