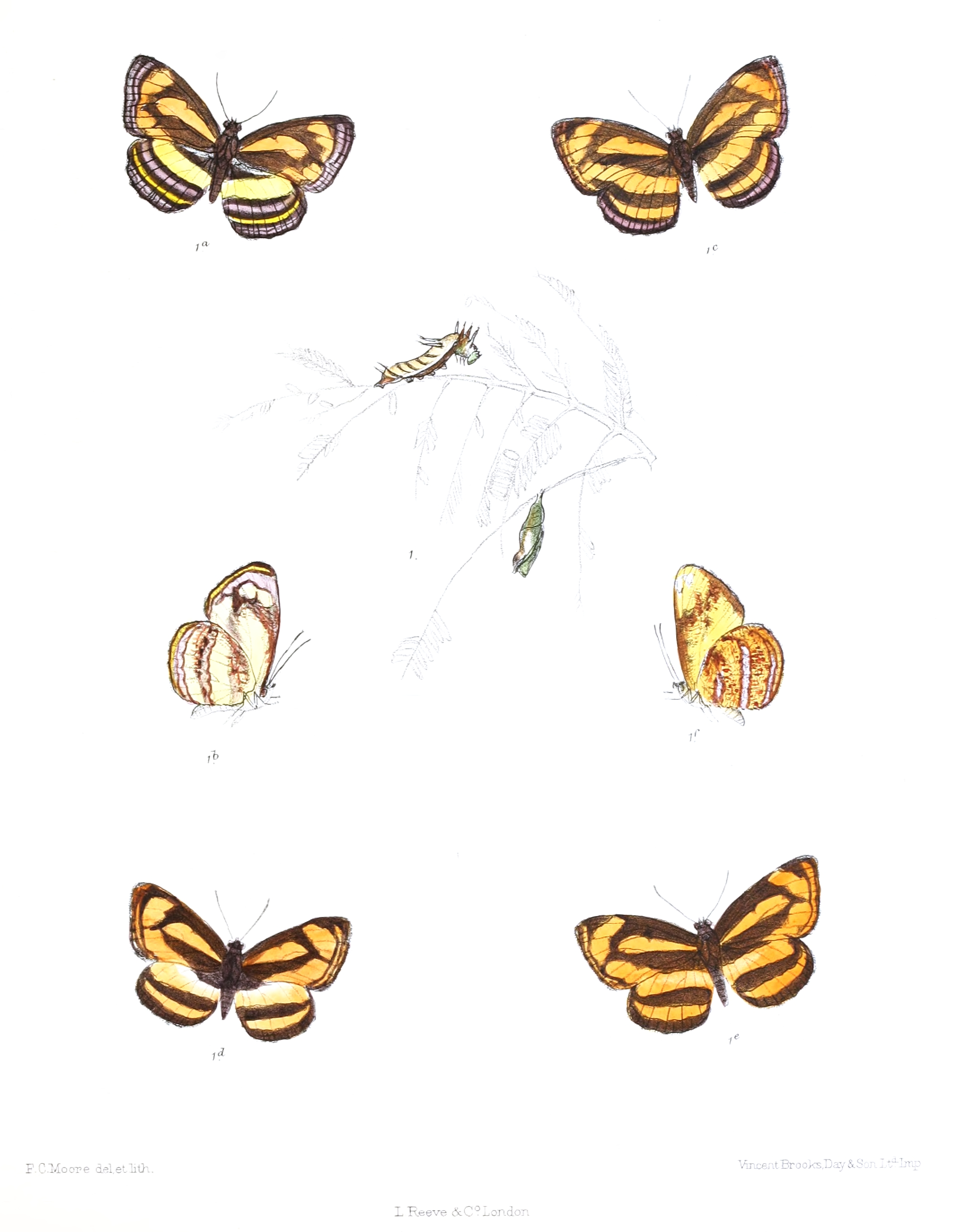
- Pantoporia hordonia

Scientific classification
- Kingdom: Animalia
- Phylum: Arthropoda
- Class: Insecta
- Order: Lepidoptera
- Family: Nymphalidae
- Tribe: Neptini
- Genus: Pantoporia; Hübner, [1819]

Species
- See text

= Pantoporia =

Genus of brush-footed butterflies

Pantoporia is a genus of Asian butterflies sometimes called the lascars. They are predominantly with striped patterns of orange and black.

Species in the genus include:

- Pantoporia antara (Moore, 1858)
- Pantoporia assamica (Moore, 1881) – Assam lascar
- Pantoporia aurelia (Staudinger, 1886) – baby lascar
- Pantoporia bieti (Oberthür, 1894) – Tytler's lascar
- Pantoporia bruijni Oberthür
- Pantoporia consimilis (Boisduval, 1832)
- Pantoporia cyrilla (Felder & Felder, 1863)
- Pantoporia epira (Felder & Felder, 1863)
- Pantoporia dama (Moore, 1858)
- Pantoporia dindinga (Butler, 1879) – greyline lascar
- Pantoporia gordia Felder
- Pantoporia hordonia (Stoll, 1790) – common Lascar
- Pantoporia karwara Fruhstorfer – Karwar lascar
- Pantoporia mysia (Felder & Felder, 1860)
- Pantoporia sandaka (Butler, 1892) – extra lascar
- Pantoporia paraka (Butler, 1879) – Perak lascar
- Pantoporia venilia (Linnaeus, 1758) – Cape York aeroplane, black-eyed plane
