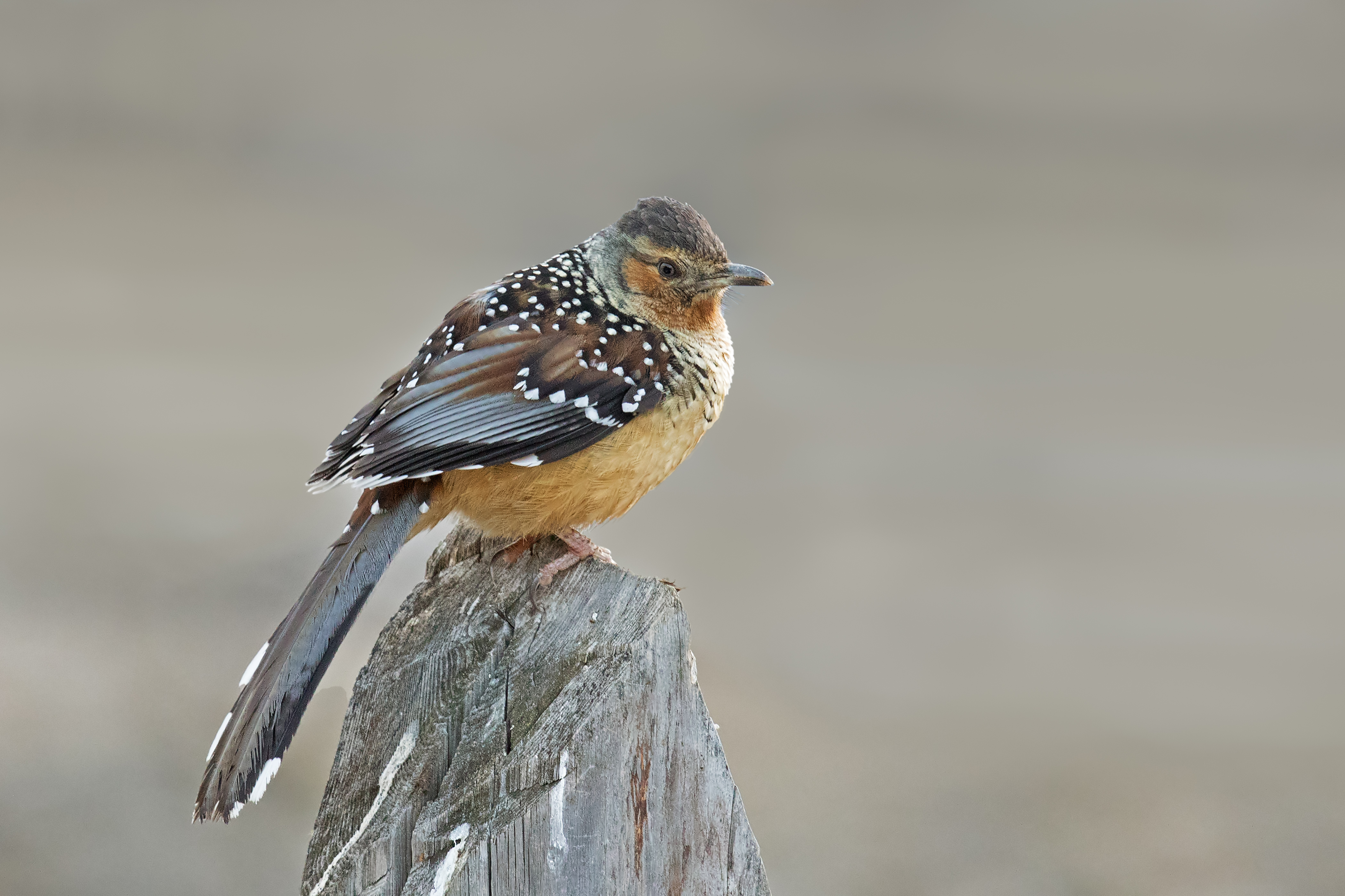

Conservation status
- Least Concern (IUCN 3.1)

Scientific classification
- Kingdom: Animalia
- Phylum: Chordata
- Class: Aves
- Order: Passeriformes
- Family: Leiothrichidae
- Genus: Ianthocincla
- Species: I. maxima

Binomial name
- Ianthocincla maxima (Verreaux, J, 1871)

Synonyms
- Garrulax maximus

= Giant laughingthrush =

Species of bird

The giant laughingthrush (Ianthocincla maxima) is a bird species in the family Leiothrichidae. It is found in central China and far northern India and Myanmar. Its natural habitat is temperate forests.

The giant laughingthrush was at one time placed in the genus Garrulax but following the publication of a comprehensive molecular phylogenetic study in 2018, it was moved to the resurrected genus Ianthocincla. The female birds often lay between 1 and 3 blue colored eggs which are bred by both parents for a period of 2 weeks. They can be distinguished by their sweet, melodious and bold sound.
