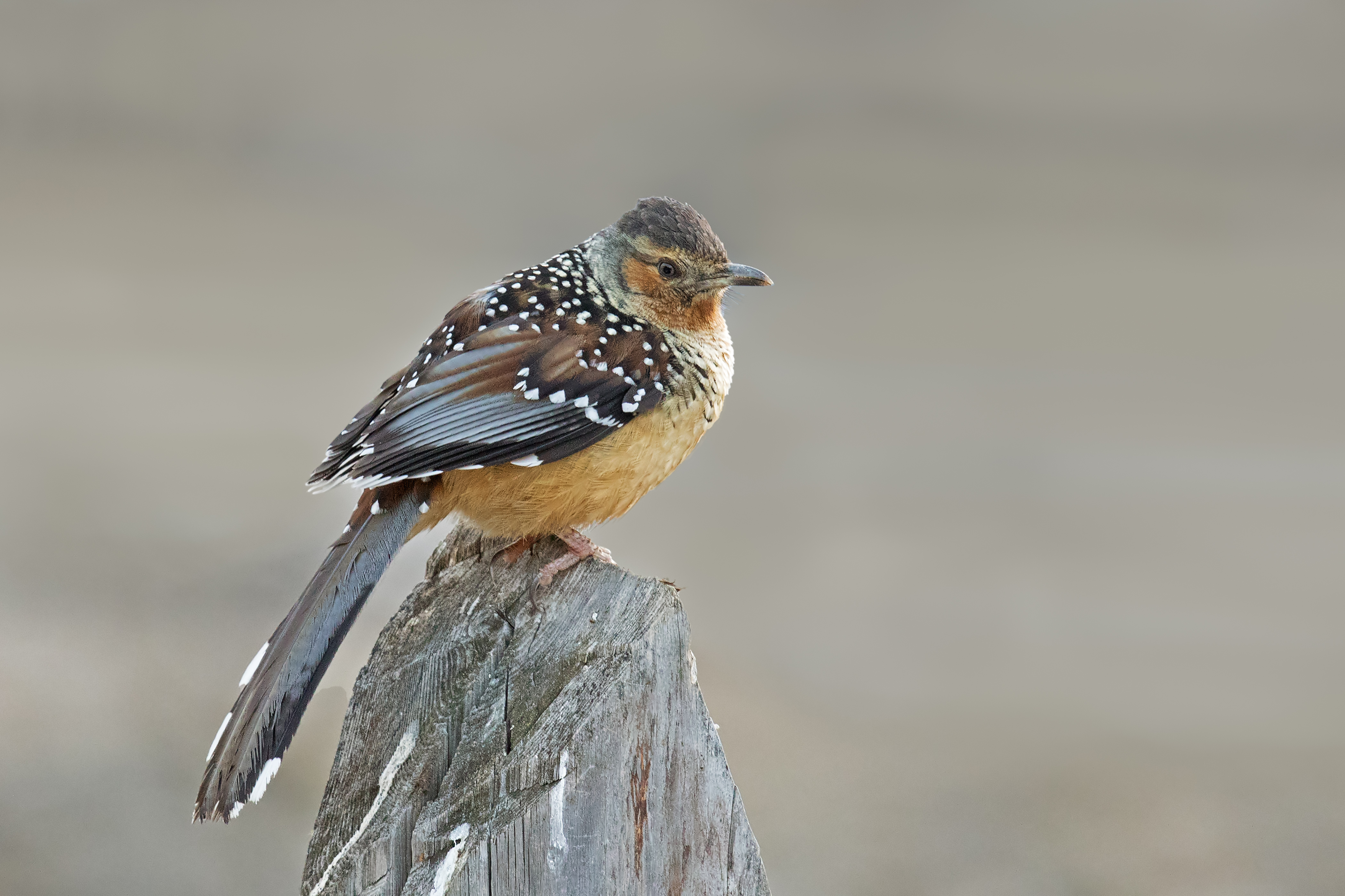
- Giant laughingthrush, (Ianthocincla maxima)

Scientific classification
- Kingdom: Animalia
- Phylum: Chordata
- Class: Aves
- Order: Passeriformes
- Family: Leiothrichidae
- Genus: Ianthocincla; Gould, 1835

Type species
- Cinclosoma ocellatum Vigors, 1831

Species
- See text

= Ianthocincla =

Genus of birds in the family Leiothrichidae

Ianthocincla is a genus of passerine birds in the family Leiothrichidae.

== Taxonomy ==
The genus Ianthocincla was erected by English ornithologist and bird artist John Gould in 1835 with the spotted laughingthrush as the type species. The name of the genus combines the Ancient Greek ionthos "young hair" or "down" with the Neo-Latin cinclus "thrush". The species now placed in the genus were previously assigned to Garrulax but following the publication of a molecular phylogenetic study in 2018, Garrulax was split up and some of the species were moved to the resurrected genus Ianthocincla.

=== Species ===
The genus contains following eight species:

| Image | Common name | Scientific name | Distribution |
|---|---|---|---|
| | Spotted laughingthrush | Ianthocincla ocellata | Bhutan, China, India, Myanmar, and Nepal. |
| | Giant laughingthrush | Ianthocincla maxima | central China and far northern India and Myanmar. |
| | Barred laughingthrush | Ianthocincla lunulata | central China |
| | White-speckled laughingthrush | Ianthocincla bieti | China |
| | Snowy-cheeked laughingthrush | Ianthocincla sukatschewi | northern China |
| | Moustached laughingthrush | Ianthocincla cineracea | China, India, and Myanmar |
| | Rufous-chinned laughingthrush | Ianthocincla rufogularis | Sikkim in northeast India |
| | Chestnut-eared laughingthrush | Ianthocincla konkakinhensis | Vietnam |
