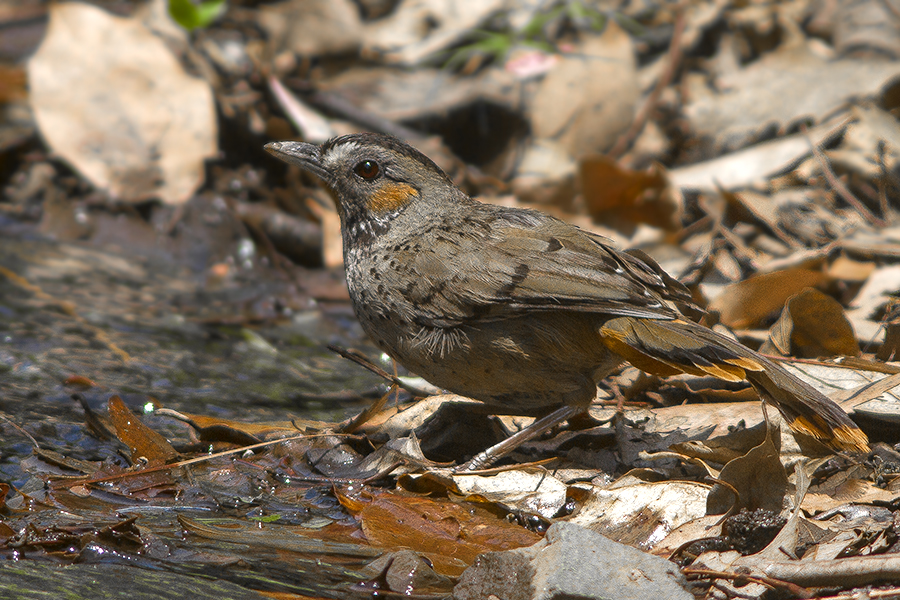
- From Naina Devi Himalayan Bird Conservation Reserve, Uttarakhand, India

Conservation status
- Least Concern (IUCN 3.1)

Scientific classification
- Kingdom: Animalia
- Phylum: Chordata
- Class: Aves
- Order: Passeriformes
- Family: Leiothrichidae
- Genus: Ianthocincla
- Species: I. rufogularis

Binomial name
- Ianthocincla rufogularis Gould, 1835

Synonyms
- Garrulax rufogularis

= Rufous-chinned laughingthrush =

Species of bird

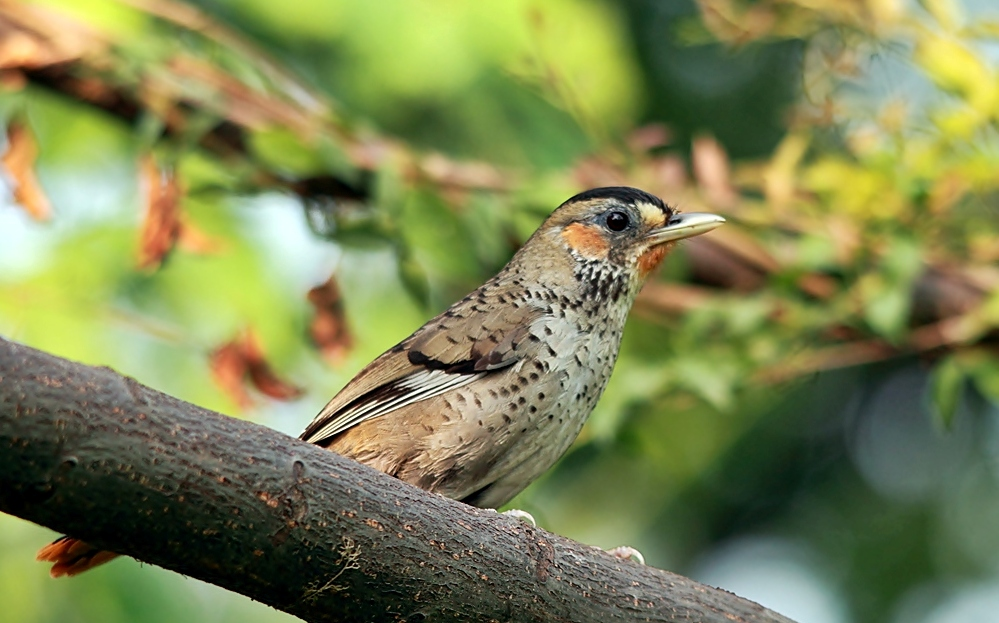
In Dehradun, India.

The rufous-chinned laughingthrush (Ianthocincla rufogularis) is a bird species in the family Leiothrichidae. It ranges across the northern parts of the Indian subcontinent and some parts of Southeast Asia.

== Taxonomy ==
The rufous-chinned laughingthrush was described by the English ornithologist and bird artist John Gould in 1835 from a specimen obtained in the Himalayas. He coined the binomial name Ianthocincla rufogularis. The type locality was restricted to the state of Sikkim in northeast India by Stuart Baker in 1920. This laughingthrush was normally placed in the genus Garrulax but following the publication of a comprehensive molecular phylogenetic study in 2018, the genus Ianthocincla was resurrected and rufous-chinned laughingthrush was returned to its original genus.

Six subspecies are recognised:

- I. r. occidentalis Hartert, 1909 – west Himalayas
- I. r. rufogularis Gould, 1835 – central Nepal to north Assam (northeast India)
- I. r. assamensis Hartert, 1909 – southeast Assam (northeast India), east Bangladesh and west Myanmar
- I. r. rufitincta Koelz, 1952 – southwest Assam (northeast India)
- I. r. rufiberbis Koelz, 1954 – southeast Arunachal Pradesh (northeast India), north Myanmar and south China
- I. r. intensior (Delacour & Jabouille, 1930) – northwest Vietnam

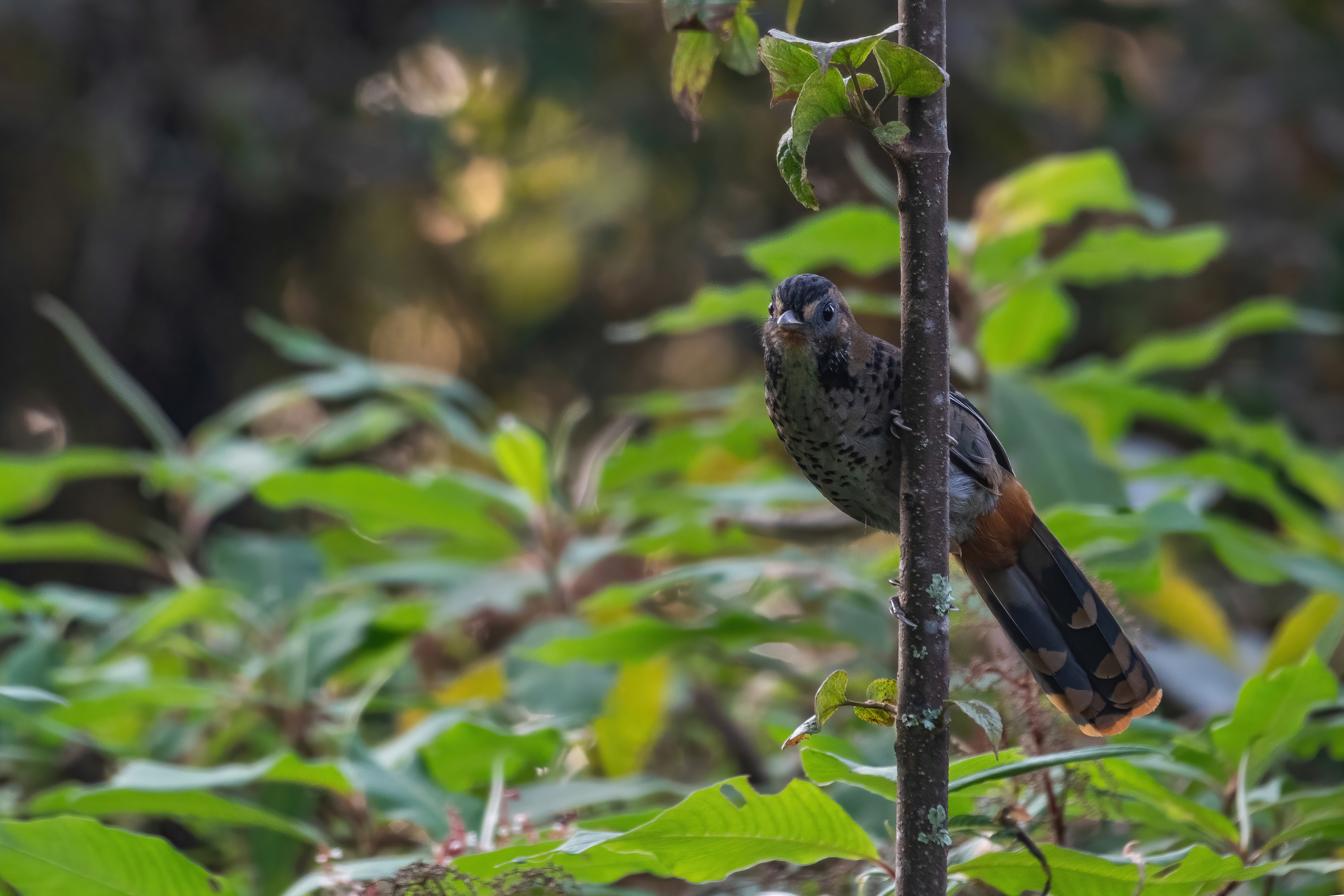
I. r. rufogularis in Nepal.

== Description ==
This mid-sized laughingthrush is found along the Himalayas and can be identified by the combination of the black cap and band on the brown tail. The underparts are greyish while the upperparts have scale like feather patterning. A distinctive pale loreal patch of buff colour and a broad dark moustachial stripe which borders the rufous chin and ear coverts are identifying features.

There is however considerable geographic variation in plumage. The western population (occidentalis of western and central Himalayas) being greyer and paler making the dark patterns stand out in greater contrast. The eastern populations assamensis have a paler throat and the markings on the throat are much less marked. The populations in Meghalaya (rufitincta) has an orange wash on the underside from the throat to the belly.

It is found in Bangladesh, Bhutan, India, Myanmar, Nepal, Pakistan, Thailand, Tibet and Vietnam. Its natural habitats are subtropical or tropical moist lowland forests and subtropical or tropical moist montane forests.
