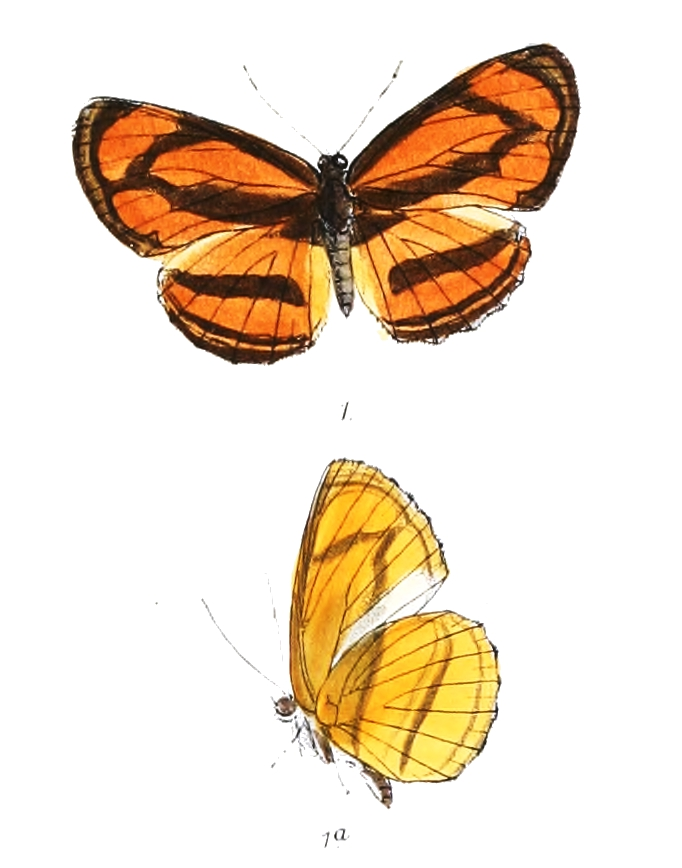
- Rahinda assamica = Pantoporia paraka assamica

Scientific classification
- Kingdom: Animalia
- Phylum: Arthropoda
- Class: Insecta
- Order: Lepidoptera
- Family: Nymphalidae
- Genus: Pantoporia
- Species: P. assamica

Binomial name
- Pantoporia assamica (Moore, 1881)

= Pantoporia assamica =

Assam lascar

Species of butterfly

Pantoporia assamica, the Assam lascar, is a species of nymphalid butterfly found in tropical and subtropical Asia.
