= Pantoporia karwara =

Karwar lascar

Scientific classification
- Kingdom: Animalia
- Phylum: Arthropoda
- Class: Insecta
- Order: Lepidoptera
- Family: Nymphalidae
- Genus: Pantoporia
- Species: P. karwara

Binomial name
- Pantoporia karwara Fruhstorfer, 1906

Species of butterfly

Pantoporia karwara, the Karwar lascar, is a species of nymphalid butterfly found in tropical and subtropical Asia.
