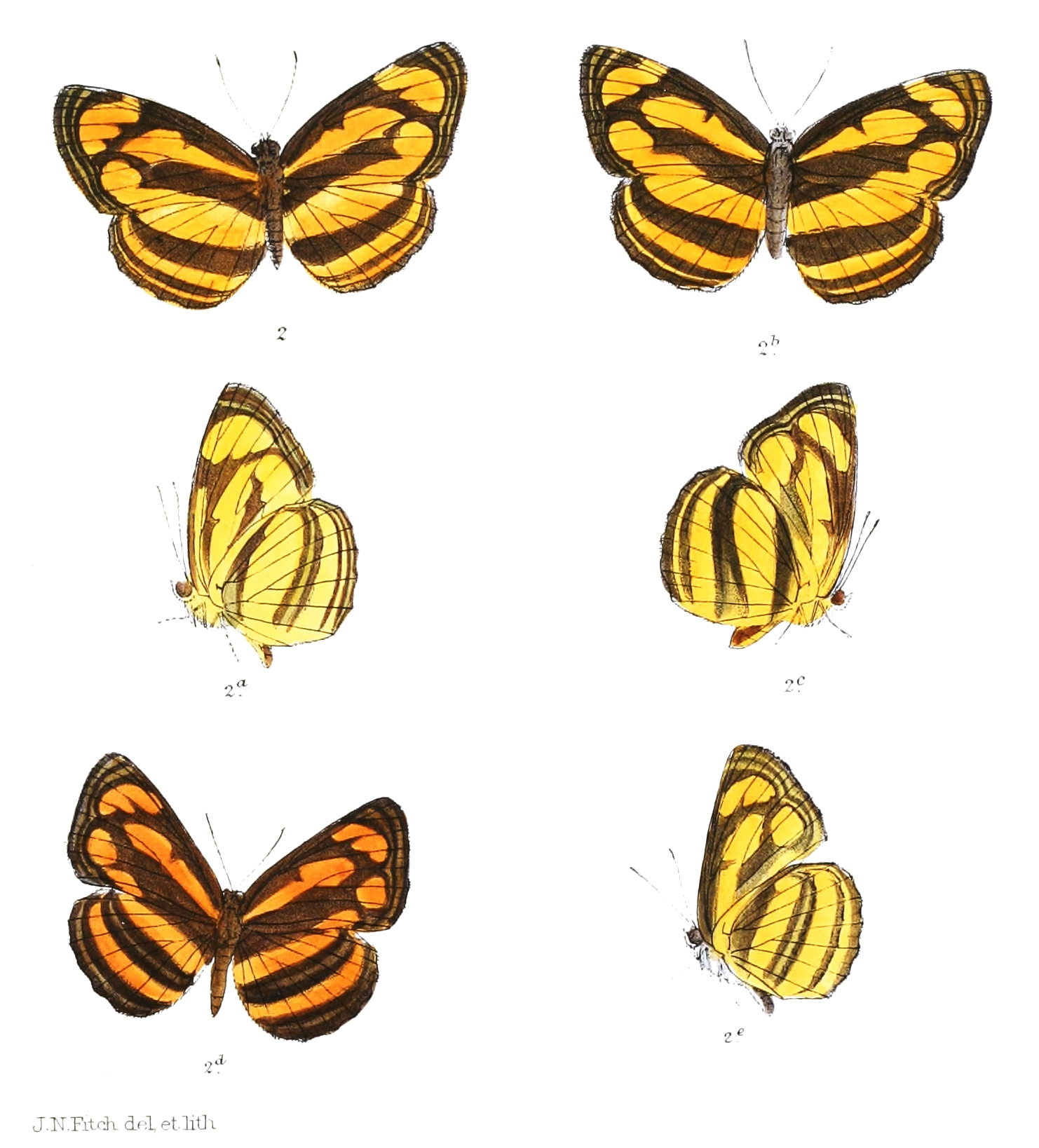

Scientific classification
- Domain: Eukaryota
- Kingdom: Animalia
- Phylum: Arthropoda
- Class: Insecta
- Order: Lepidoptera
- Family: Nymphalidae
- Genus: Pantoporia
- Species: P. dindinga

Binomial name
- Pantoporia dindinga (Butler, 1879)

Synonyms
- Neptis dindinga Butler, 1879

= Pantoporia dindinga =

Species of butterfly

Pantoporia dindinga, the greyline lascar, is a species of nymphalid butterfly found in Asia, where it ranges from Burma to Peninsular Malaysia, Bangka, Borneo and possibly Sumatra.
