= Faecalibacter macacae =

Scientific classification
- Domain: Bacteria
- Kingdom: Pseudomonadati
- Phylum: Bacteroidota
- Class: Flavobacteriia
- Order: Flavobacteriales
- Family: Flavobacteriaceae
- Genus: Faecalibacter
- Species: F. macacae

Binomial name
- Faecalibacter macacae Chen et al. 2020

Type strain
- YIM 102668

Species of bacterium

Faecalibacter macacae is a bacterium from the genus of Faecalibacter which has been isolated from faeces of an Assam macaque.
