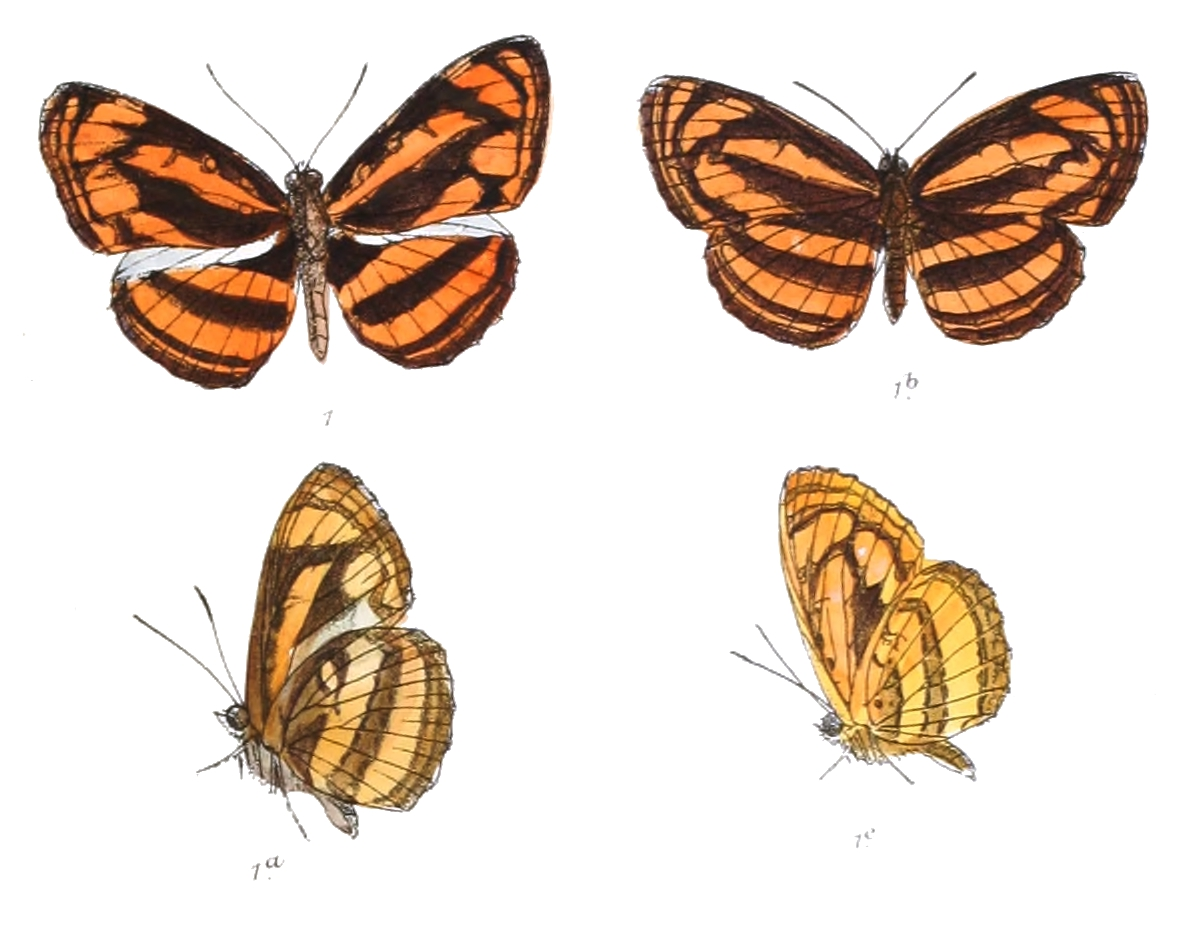

Scientific classification
- Domain: Eukaryota
- Kingdom: Animalia
- Phylum: Arthropoda
- Class: Insecta
- Order: Lepidoptera
- Family: Nymphalidae
- Genus: Pantoporia
- Species: P. aurelia

Binomial name
- Pantoporia aurelia (Staudinger, 1886)

Synonyms
- Neptis aurelia Staudinger, 1886; Rahinda aurelia

= Pantoporia aurelia =

Species of butterfly

Pantoporia aurelia, the baby lascar, is a species of nymphalid butterfly found in Asia.

== Subspecies ==
- Pantoporia aurelia aurelia (Peninsular Malaya, Sumatra, Batu, Borneo)
- Pantoporia aurelia boma Eliot, 1969 (southern Sumatra to Peninsular Thailand)
