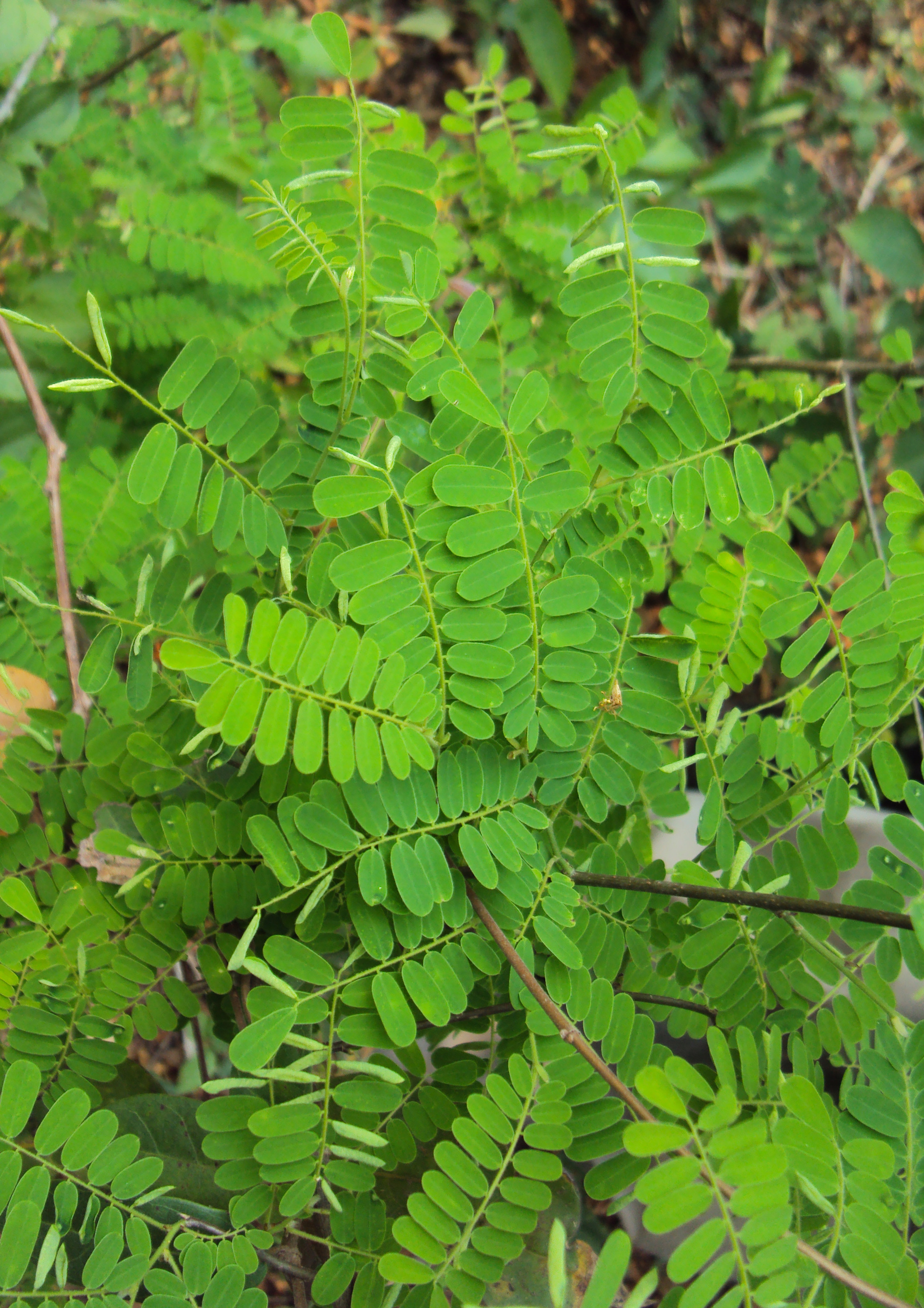

Conservation status
- Near Threatened (IUCN 3.1)

Scientific classification
- Kingdom: Plantae
- Clade: Tracheophytes
- Clade: Angiosperms
- Clade: Eudicots
- Clade: Rosids
- Order: Fabales
- Family: Fabaceae
- Subfamily: Faboideae
- Genus: Dalbergia
- Species: D. horrida

Binomial name
- Dalbergia horrida (Dennst.) Mabb.

Synonyms
- Amerimnon horridum Dennst.; Amerimnon sympatheticum (Nimmo) Kuntze; Dalbergia horrida var. horrida; Dalbergia multiflora B.Heyne; Dalbergia multiflora Prain; Dalbergia sympathetica Nimmo

= Dalbergia horrida =

Species of legume

Dalbergia horrida is a species of thorny liana, with the Vietnamese name trắc nhiều hoa (under the synonym D. multiflora = "many flowers") which is in the subfamily Faboideae and tribe Dalbergieae.

== Subspecies ==
The Catalogue of Life lists:

- D. h. concanensis
- D. h. glabrescens (Prain) Thoth. & Nair
- D. h. horrida

== Gallery ==
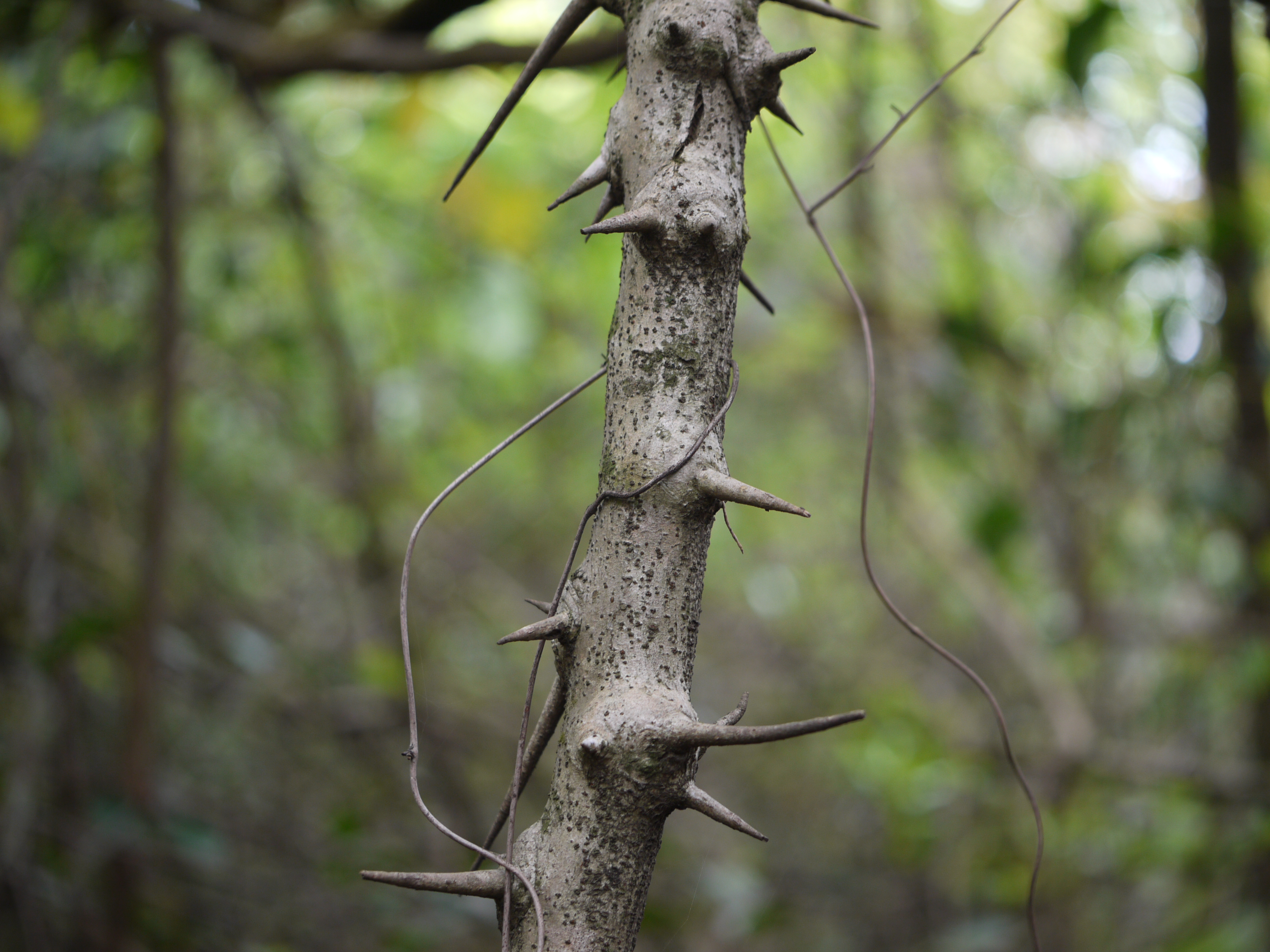

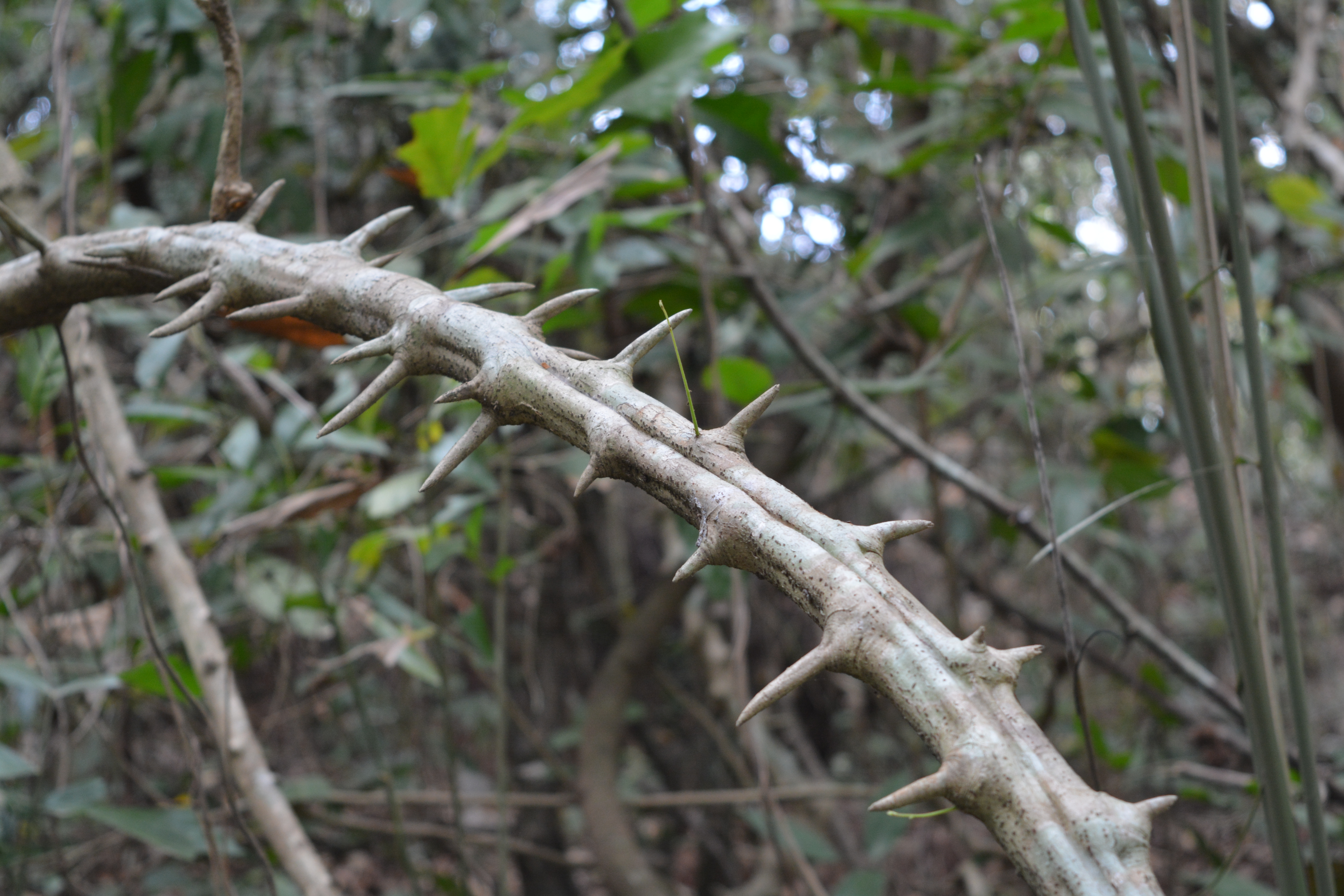

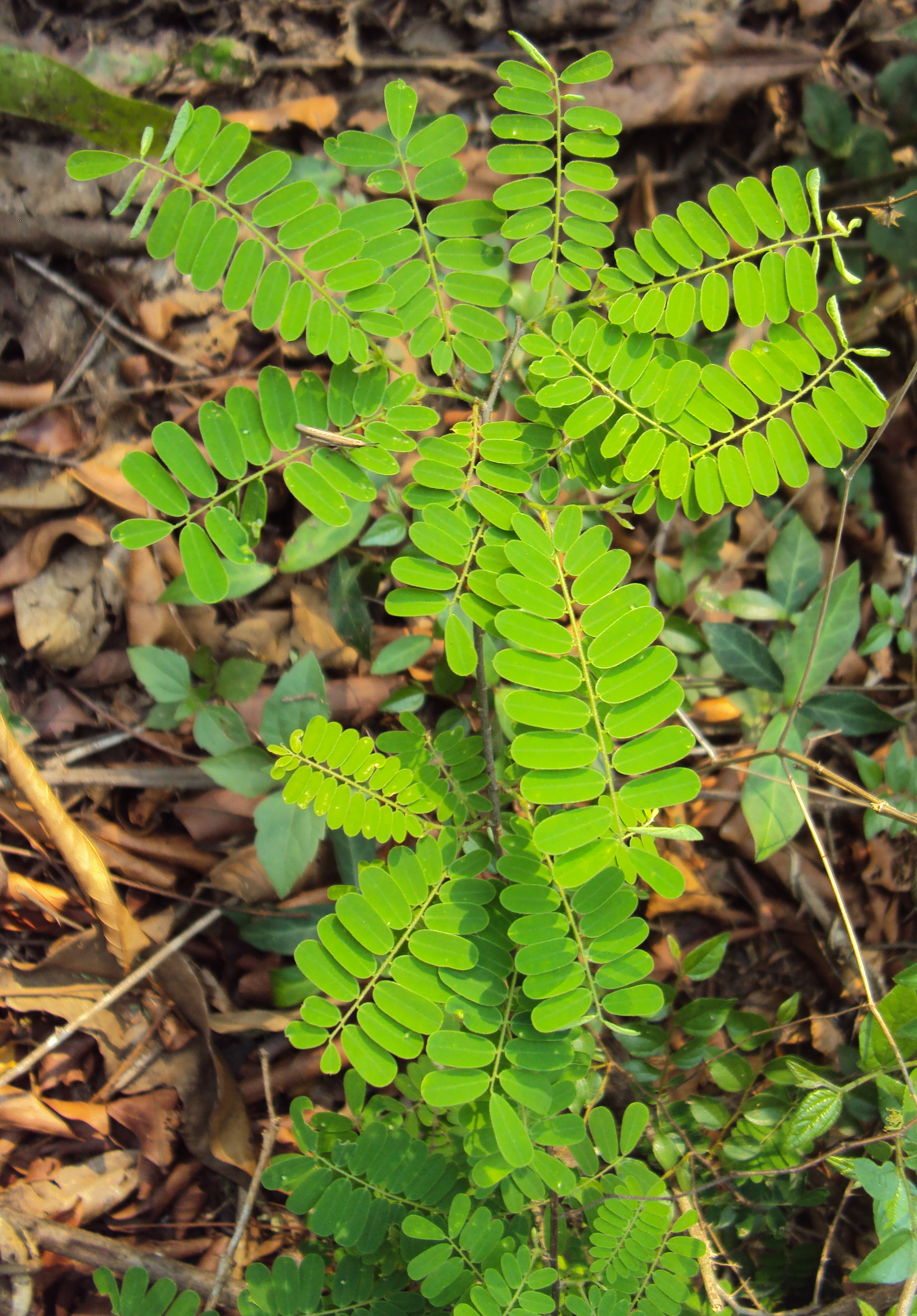

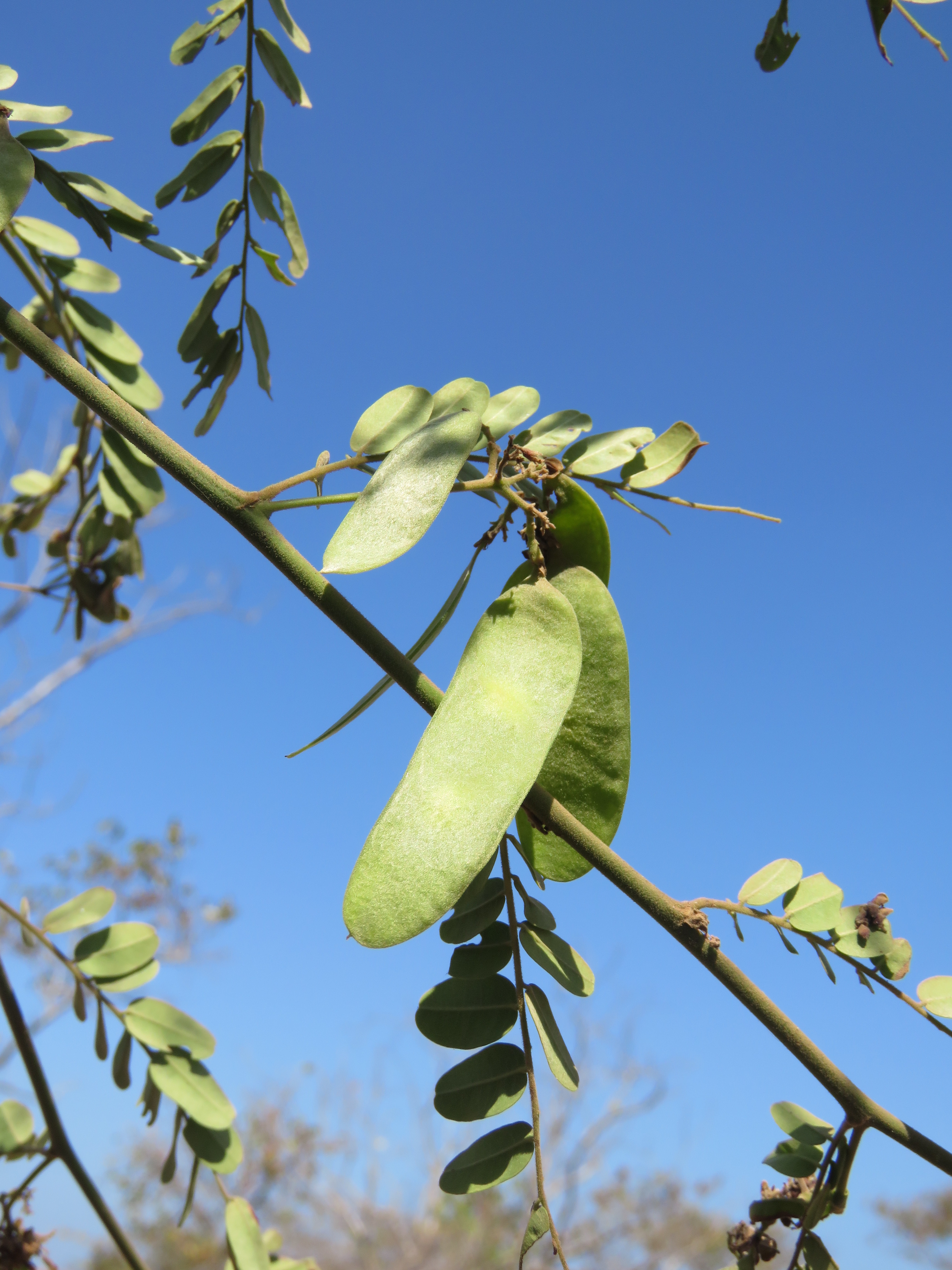
