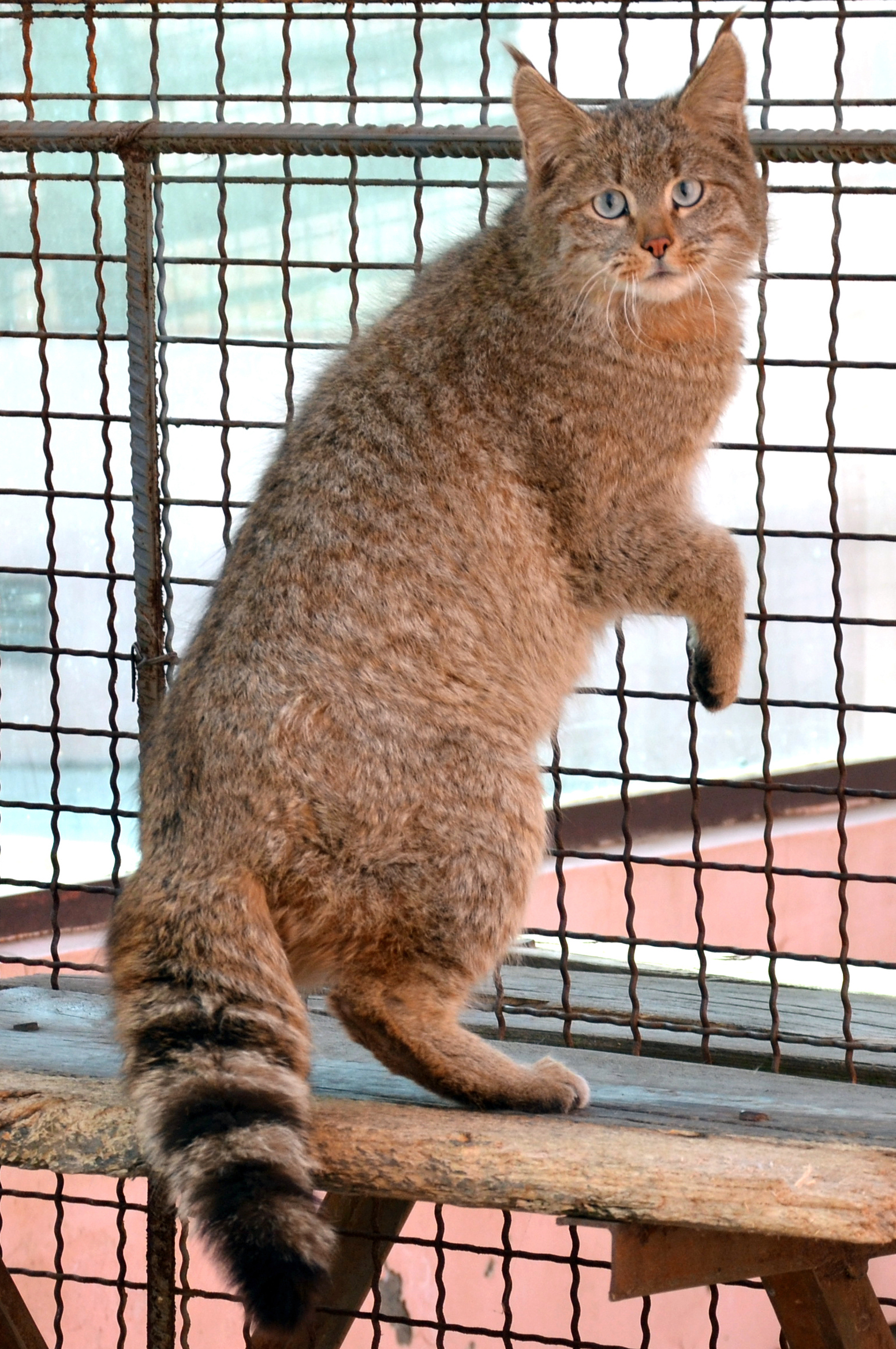
- Chinese mountain cat in Xining Zoo

Conservation status
- Vulnerable (IUCN 3.1)
- CITES Appendix II

Scientific classification
- Kingdom: Animalia
- Phylum: Chordata
- Class: Mammalia
- Order: Carnivora
- Family: Felidae
- Genus: Felis
- Species: F. bieti

Binomial name
- Felis bieti Milne-Edwards, 1892

= Chinese mountain cat =

Small wild cat

The Chinese mountain cat (Felis bieti), also known as Chinese desert cat and Chinese steppe cat, is a small wild Felis species with sand-coloured fur, faint dark stripes on the face and legs and black tipped ears. It is endemic to the Tibetan Plateau of western China, where it lives in grassland above elevations of 2,500 m (8,200 ft). It has been listed as vulnerable on the IUCN Red List since 2002.

== Taxonomy and phylogeny ==
The scientific name Felis bieti was proposed by Alphonse Milne-Edwards in 1892 who described the Chinese mountain cat based on a skin collected in Sichuan Province. He named it Felis Bieti in honour of the French missionary Félix Biet.

In 2007, it was provisionally classified as a wildcat subspecies under the name F. silvestris bieti. It has been recognised as a valid species since 2017, as it is morphologically distinct from wildcats. Two subspecies were formerly recognized although neither is presently considered valid. Felis bieti chutuchta was described from a skull and pelt from Felis lybica, and F. bieti vellerosa from a skin of either Felis chausi or Felis catus taken outside of its original range.

The Chinese mountain cat belongs to an evolutionary Felis lineage that is estimated to have had a common ancestor with the Asiatic wildcat (F. lybica ornata) around 1.5 million years ago during the Middle Pleistocene. Gene flow from Chinese mountain cats to domestic cats (F. catus) in a few areas of the Tibetan Plateau is estimated to have happened between the 1960s and 2000s.

== Characteristics ==
The Chinese mountain cat has sand-coloured fur with dark guard hairs. Faint dark horizontal stripes on the face and legs are hardly visible. Its ears have black tips. It has a relatively broad skull, and long hair growing between the pads of their feet. It is whitish on the belly, and its legs and tail bear black rings. The tip of the tail is black. It is 69–84 cm (27–33 in) long in head and body with a 29–41 cm (11–16 in) long tail. Adults weigh from 6.5 to 9 kg (14 to 20 lb).

== Distribution and habitat ==
The Chinese mountain cat is endemic to China and lives on the north-eastern edge of the Tibetan Plateau. It was recorded only in eastern Qinghai and north-western Sichuan. It inhabits high-elevation steppe grassland, alpine meadow, alpine shrubland and coniferous forest edges at elevations of 2,500–5,000 m (8,200–16,400 ft). It has not been confirmed in true desert or heavily forested mountains.

The first photographs of a wild Chinese mountain cat were taken in 2007. Between May 2015 and April 2016, individuals were observed and photographed in rocky terrain and grasslands in Ruoergai county. In 2016–2017, a camera trap survey in a provincial nature reserve in Xinlong County yielded records in conifer forest at an elevation range of 3,838–4,026 m (12,592–13,209 ft). Between autumn 2018 and spring 2019, Chinese mountain cats were documented in an alpine meadow in the Sanjiangyuan region of the Tibetan Plateau.

== Ecology and behaviour ==
The Chinese mountain cat preys on pikas, rodents and birds. It breeds between January and March. Females give birth to two to four kittens in a secluded burrow. The burrows are typically abandoned marmot or badger dens on south-facing slopes. Cats have been observed to kill marmots before taking residence in their burrows.

Ten Chinese mountain cats were studied in the Qilian Mountains from June 2020 to December 2021; they were active throughout the day but with a higher activity level from late afternoon to early night.

== Threats ==
The Chinese mountain cat is threatened due to the organised poisoning of pikas. The poison used diminishes prey species and also kills cats unintentionally.

== Conservation ==
Felis bieti is listed on CITES Appendix II. It is protected in China by laws such as the Animal Protection Law and the Forestry Law. It has been listed as a vulnerable species on the IUCN Red List since 2002 and is included in the list of National First-Class Protected Animals under the Law of the People's Republic on the Conservation of Wild Animals since February 2021.

In July 2023, a Chinese mountain cat was fitted with a GPS collar and released into the wild by the Qinghai Wildlife Rescue and Breeding Center. A five-year-old male was caught in a mouse trap when trying to hunt in a chicken pen. He was sent to the Center in June 2023 to be treated for a leg wound and for rehabilitation.

== See also ==
- List of endangered and protected species of China
