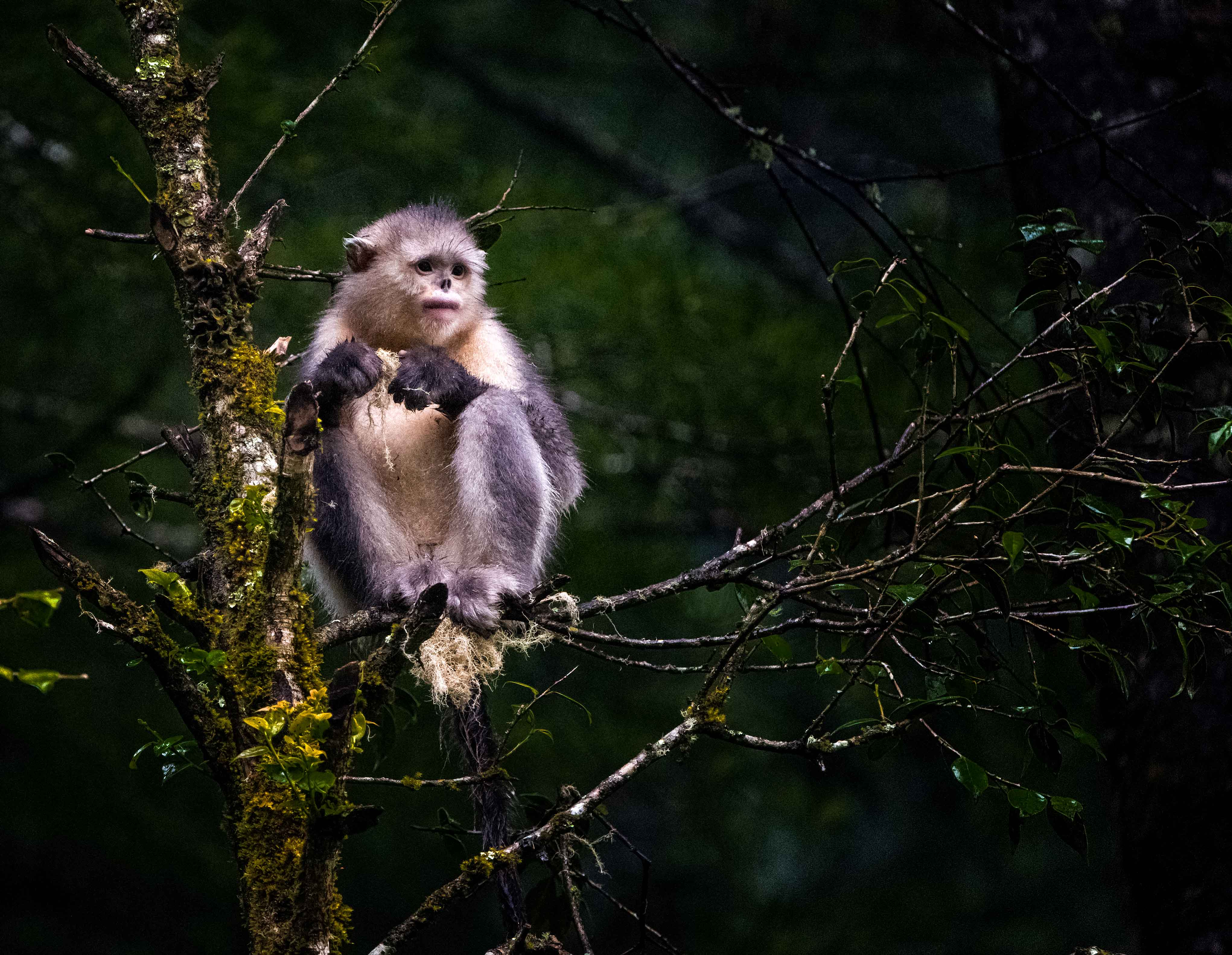

Conservation status
- Endangered (IUCN 3.1)
- CITES Appendix I

Scientific classification
- Kingdom: Animalia
- Phylum: Chordata
- Class: Mammalia
- Infraclass: Placentalia
- Order: Primates
- Family: Cercopithecidae
- Genus: Rhinopithecus
- Species: R. bieti

Binomial name
- Rhinopithecus bieti (A. Milne-Edwards, 1897)
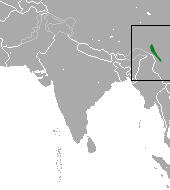
- Black snub-nosed monkey range

= Black-and-white snub-nosed monkey =

Species of Old World monkey

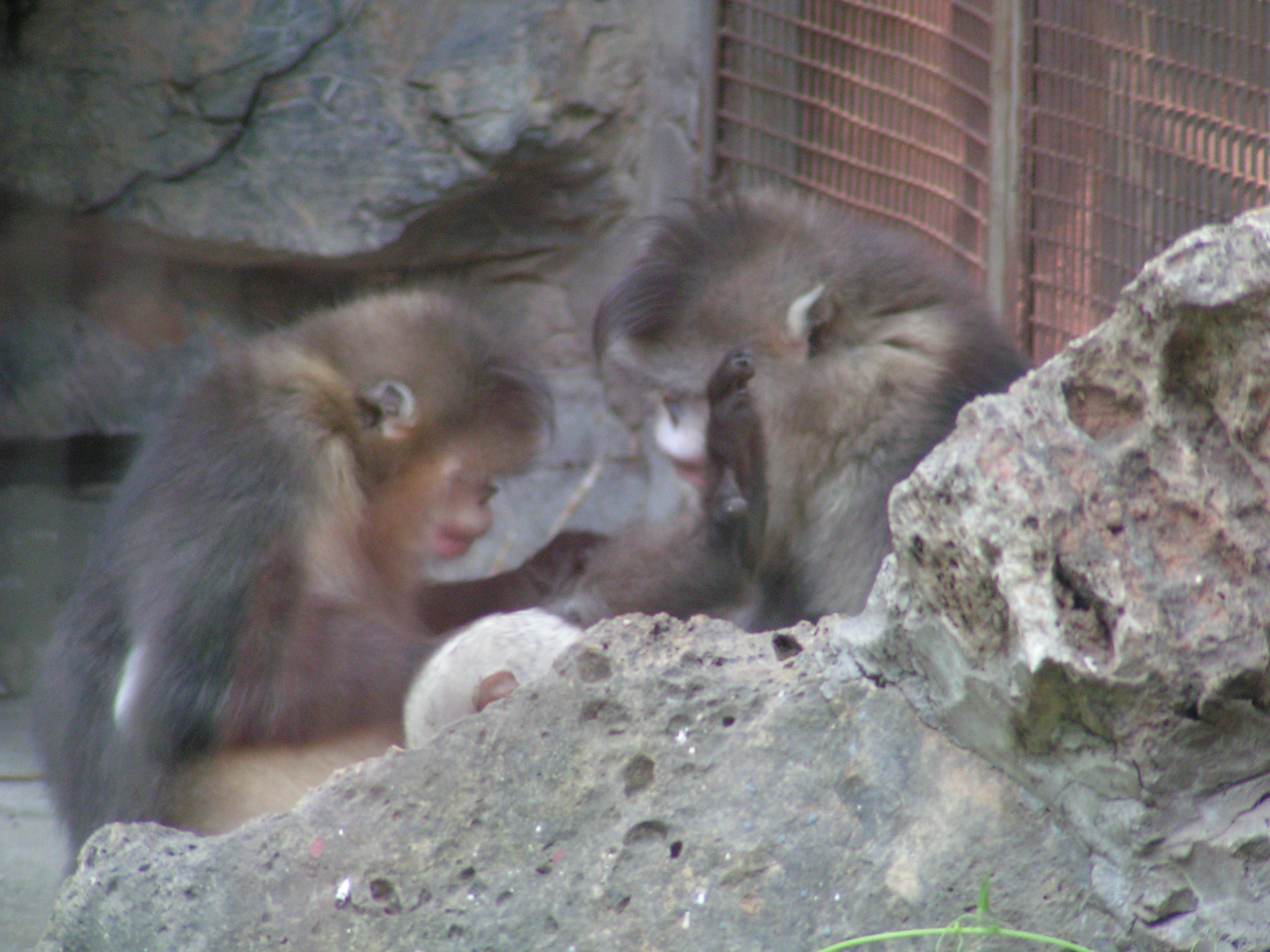
Black-and-white snub-nosed monkeys.

The black-and-white snub-nosed monkey (Rhinopithecus bieti), also known as the Yunnan snub-nosed monkey, is a large black and white primate that lives only in the southern Chinese province of Yunnan, where it is known to the locals as the Yunnan golden hair monkey (Chinese: 滇金丝猴) and the black-and-white snub-nosed monkey (黑白仰鼻猴). The common name, black snub-nosed monkey, is issued to Rhinopithecus strykeri, inhabiting the Northern Sino-Myanmar border. Coniferous and deciduous forests in the mountainous regions of Yunnan are the ideal terrain for these primates. It is threatened by habitat loss, and is considered an endangered species. With their unique adaptations to their environment, these monkeys thrive at extreme altitudes despite the below freezing temperatures and thin air. This primate's diet is mainly made up of the large amounts of lichens available in their region.

== Anatomy and physiology ==
Male and female black-and-white snub-nosed monkeys have no colorization differences, but do differ in sizes. Females weigh 20 lbs, while males are around 30 lbs. Adult black-and-white snub-nosed monkeys are identifiable by their gray/black and white fur. The underbelly and central facial zone are all white, while the rest of the body is a grayish black color. Their fur is extremely thick to protect them against below freezing temperatures. They are born with white fur that darkens with age. Another distinctive feature, shared by both adults and babies, is their hairless and vibrant pink lips. These primates get the "snub-nosed" part of their name from the absence of nasal bones. This is considered their most distinctive feature.

== Behavior ==
=== Diet ===
Unlike many primates, the black-and-white snub-nosed monkey's diet consists mainly of lichen found on trees. Lichens grow in abundance in mountainous regions, and make for a reliable, year-round food supply. These primates will also eat bamboo leaves and other, more seasonal plants if the opportunity presents itself. Many food items vary depending on the geographical location of each troop including rhododendron flower's nectar in the spring. Lichens are toxic to most animals, but the black-and-white snub-nosed monkey has specialized digestive enzymes similar to those of a cow that remove the harmful bacteria.

=== Reproduction ===
The reproduction cycles of black-and-white snub-nosed monkeys are generally similar to those of golden snub-nosed monkeys, except the time of birth is often two to three months later due to a colder climate. Like most primates, the snub-nosed monkey gives birth at night, making it difficult for researchers to observe. A rare observation of a daytime birth found a multiparous female assisting another female in the birthing process, similar to human midwifery practice.

== Evolution ==
The black-and-white snub-nosed monkey lives at the highest altitude of any known non-human primate. The highest recorded altitude of a group of this species is 4700 m. Surviving in such extreme conditions is only made possible by a mutation in the primate's genomic DNA sequence that allows increased resistance to oxygen deprivation (hypoxia). Other mutations in the DNA sequence have been found to be harmful to the monkeys, as there is evidence of inbreeding and low genetic diversity among populations.

=== Geographical range and habitat ===
This species has a highly restricted distribution in the bio-diverse Nujiang Langcang Gorge alpine conifer and mixed forests of the Yun Range, which is part of the greater Hengduan Mountains. Only 17 groups with a total population of less than 1,700 animals survive in northwest Yunnan and neighboring regions in the Autonomous Prefecture of Tibet. The territory of each group varies from 20 to 135 square km. Deciduous and coniferous forests are their preferred habitat, where lichen grows in abundance year-round.

== History ==
The black-and-white snub-nosed monkey was almost completely unknown until the 1990s. The fact that no zoo outside of China has ever kept the black-and-white snub-nosed monkey in captivity has contributed to the enigmatic status of this species.

== See also ==
- List of endangered and protected species of China
- Three Parallel Rivers of Yunnan Protected Areas
