= List of species in the Hoollongapar Gibbon Sanctuary =

The Hoollongapar Gibbon Sanctuary in Assam, India is an isolated protected area of evergreen forest with rich biodiversity.

== Flora ==
Several species of cane and more than a hundred species of herb, shrub, undershrub, lianas, bamboo and grass can be found at the Hoollongapar Gibbon Sanctuary.

- Ou tenga (Dillenia indica)
- Amari (Aglaia spectabilis)
- Gahorisopa (Magnolia griffithii)
- Borhamthuri (Magnolia hodgsonii)
- Bandardima (Dysoxylum sp.)
- Titachapa (Michelia baillonii)
- Bhelekor (Aristolochia tagala)
- Chalmogra (Hydnocarpus kurzii)
- Bhelu (Tetrameles nudiflora)
- Bon aam (Mangifera sylvatica)
- Bonpetha (Chrysophyllum roxburghii)
- Borpat (Ailanthus integrifolia)
- Nahor (Mesua ferrea)
- Holong (Dipterocarpus macrocarpus)
- Garjan (Dipterocarpus turbinatus)
- Himolu (Bombax ceiba)
- Selleng (Sapium baccatum)
- Rudraksha (Elaeocarpus sphaericus)
- Dewa sam (Artocarpus lacucha)
- Dhuna (Canarium bengalense)
- Amora (Spondias pinnata)
- Moj (Pithecellobium monadelphum)
- Arjun (Terminalia arjuna)
- Halakh (Terminalia myriocarpa)
- Kendu (Diospyros embryopteris)
- Sationa (Alstonia scholaris)
- Sachi (Aqualaria agolacha)
- Cham kothal (Artocarpus chama)
- Kath badam (Mansonia dipikae)
- Gamari (Gmelina arborea)
- Hingari (Castanopsis indica)
- Lemtem (Gynocardia odorata)
- Paroli (Stereospermum chelonoides)

Some important climbers of the sanctuary are:

- Mamoilata (Gnetum montanum)
- Bonjalika (Clematis cadmia)
- Hoolooklata (Pycnarrhena pleniflora)
- Tubukilata (Cissampelos pareira)
- Tikanibaruwal (Byttneria grandifolia)
- Chepatalata (Cayratia trifolia)
- Harjodralata (Cissus quadrangularis)
- Panilata (Vitis planicaulis)
- Bakalbih (Millettia pachycarpa)
- Bandor Kankora (Mucuna pruriens)
- Kalmow (Ipomoea aquatica)
- Raghumola (Cuscuta reflexa)
- Aaownipan (Peperomia thomsonii)

== Fauna ==
=== Mammals ===
- Western hoolock gibbon (Hoolock hoolock)
- Stump-tailed macaque (Macaca arctoides)
- Northern pig-tailed macaque (Macaca leonina)
- Eastern Assamese macaque (Macaca assamensis assamensis)
- Bengal slow loris (Nycticebus bengalensis)
- Indian rhesus macaque (Macaca mulatta mulatta)
- Capped langur (Trachypithecus pileatus durga)
- Indian hog deer (Hyelaphus porcinus)
- Sambar (Cervus unicolor)
- Indian crested porcupine (Hystrix indica)
- Tiger (Panthera tigris)
- Leopard (Panthera pardus)
- Jungle cat (Felis chaus)
- Large Indian civet (Viverra zibetha)
- Small Indian civet (Viverricula indica)
- Common palm civet (Paradoxurus hermaphroditus)
- Malayan giant squirrel (Ratufa bicolor)
- Irrawaddy squirrel (Callosciurus pygerythrus)
- Indian elephant (Elephas maximus indicus)
- Marbled cat (Pardofelis marmorata)
- Leopard cat (Prionailurus bengalensis)
- Indian grey mongoose (Urva edwardsii)
- Small Asian mongoose (Urva auropunctata)
- Indian fox (Vulpes bengalensis)
- Jackal (Canis aureus)
- Wild boar (Sus scrofa)

=== Reptiles ===
- Indian python (Python molurus)
- Cat snake (Boiga trigonata)
- Indian cobra (Naja naja)
- Common rat snake (Ptyas mucosa)

=== Birds ===
- Red junglefowl (Gallus gallus)
- Kalij pheasant (Lophura leucomelanos)
- Ruddy shelduck (Tadorna furruginea)
- Common teal (Anas crecca)
- Common pochard (Aythya ferina)
- Speckled piculet (Picumnus innominatus)
- White-browed piculet (Sasia ochracea)
- Rufous woodpecker (Celeus brachyurus)
- Grey-capped pygmy woodpecker (Dendrocopos canicapillus)
- Fulvous-breasted woodpecker (Dendrocopos macei)
- Lesser yellownape (Picus chlorolophus)
- Greater yellownape (Picus flavinucha)
- Streak-throated woodpecker (Picus xanthopygaeus)
- Grey-headed woodpecker (Picus canus)
- Himalayan flameback (Dinopium shorii)
- Common flameback (Dinopium javanense)
- Greater flameback (Chrysocolaptes lucidus)
- Lineated barbet (Megalaima lineata)
- Golden-throated barbet (Megalaima franklinii)
- Blue-throated barbet (Megalaima asiatica)
- Blue-eared barbet (Megalaima australis)
- Coppersmith barbet (Megalaima haemacephala)
- Oriental pied hornbill (Anthracoceros albirostris)
- Great hornbill (Buceros bicornis)
- Common hoopoe (Upupa epops)
- Red-headed trogon (Harpactes erythrocephalus)
- Indian roller (Coracias benghalensis)
- Dollarbird (Eurystomus orientalis)
- Common kingfisher (Alcedo atthis)
- Stork-billed kingfisher (Halcyon capensis)
- White-throated kingfisher (Halcyon smyrnensis)
- Pied kingfisher (Ceryle rudis)
- Blue-bearded bee-eater (Nyctyornis athertoni)
- Asian green bee-eater (Merops orientalis)
- Blue-tailed bee-eater (Merops philippinus)
- Chestnut-headed bee-eater (Merops leschenaulti)
- Pied cuckoo (Clamator jacobinus)
- Chestnut-winged cuckoo (Clamator coromandus)
- Common hawk-cuckoo (Hierococcyx varius)
- Indian cuckoo (Cuculus micropterus)
- Plaintive cuckoo (Cacomantis merulinus)
- Asian emerald cuckoo (Chrysococcyx maculates)
- Square-tailed drongo-cuckoo (Surniculus lugubris)
- Asian koel (Eudynamys scolopacea)
- Greater coucal (Centropus sinensis)
- Lesser coucal (Centropus bengalensis)
- Alexandrine parakeet (Psittacula eupatria)
- Rose-ringed parakeet (Psittacula krameri)
- Red-breasted parakeet (Psittacula alexandri)
- Blossom-headed parakeet (Psittacula roseate)
- Himalayan swiftlet (Collocalia brevirostris)
- Asian palm swift (Cypsiurus balasiensis)
- House swift (Apus affinis)
- Mountain scops owl (Otus spilocephalus)
- Oriental scops owl (Otus sunia)
- Collared scops owl (Otus bakkamoena)
- Brown fish owl (Ketupa zeylonensis)
- Collared owlet (Glaucidium brodiei)
- Asian barred owlet (Glaucidium cuculoides)
- Spotted owlet (Athene brama)
- Brown boobookl (Ninox scutulata)
- Grey nightjar (Caprimulgus indicus)
- Large-tailed nightjar (Caprimulgus macrurus)
- Ashy wood pigeon (Columba pulchricollis)
- Green imperial pigeon (Ducula aenea)
- Oriental turtle dove (Streptopelia orientalis)
- Spotted dove (Streptopelia chinensis)
- Emerald dove (Chalcophaps indica)
- Ashy-headed green pigeon (Treron phayrei)
- Yellow-footed green pigeon (Treron phoenicoptera)
- White-breasted waterhen (Amaurornis phoenicurus)
- Western swamphen (Porphyrio porphyrio)
- Common moorhen (Gallinula chloropus)
- Common snipe (Gallinago gallinago)
- Common greenshank (Tringa nebularia)
- Wood sandpiper (Tringa glareola)
- Common sandpiper (Actitis hypoleucos)
- Little ringed plover (Charadrius dubius)
- Red-wattled lapwing (Vanellus indicus)
- Pheasant-tailed jacana (Hydrophasianus chirugus)
- Bronze-winged jacana (Metopidius indicus)
- River tern (Sterna aurantia)
- Black baza (Aviceda leuphotes)
- Black kite (Milvus migrans)
- Grey-headed fish eagle (Ichtyophaga ichthyaetus)
- Crested serpent eagle (Spilornis cheela)
- Pied harrier (Circus melanoleucos)
- Shikra (Accipiter badius)
- Black-winged kite (Elanus caeruleus)
- Oriental darter (Anhinga melanogaster)
- Little cormorant (Phalacrocorax niger)
- Indian cormorant (Phalacrocorax fuscicollis)
- Great cormorant (Phalacrocorax carbo)
- Little egret (Egretta garzetta)
- Great egret (Ardea alba)
- Intermediate egret (Mesophoyx intermedia)
- Cattle egret (Bubulcus ibis)
- Indian pond heron (Ardeola grayii)
- Little heron (Butorides stratus)
- Black-crowned night heron (Nyctiorax nycticorax)
- Asian openbill (Anastomus oscitans)
- Lesser adjutant (Leptoptilos javanicus)
- Oriental white-eye (Zosterops palpebrosus)
- Asian fairy bluebird (Irena puella)
- Golden-fronted leafbird (Chloropsis aurifrons)
- Orange-bellied leafbird (Chloropsis hardwickii)
- Common iora (Aegithine tiphia)
- Brown shrike (Lanius cristatus)
- Long-tailed shrike (Lanius schach)
- Grey-backed shrike (Lanius tephronotus)
- Rufous treepie (Dendrocitta vagabunda)
- Grey treepie (Dendrocitta formosae)
- Collared treepie (Dendrocitta frontails)
- House crow (Corvus splendens)
- Large-billed crow (Corvus macrorhynchos)
- Black-hooded oriole (Oriolus xanthornus)
- Maroon oriole (Oriolus traillii)
- Large cuckoo-shrike (Coracina macei)
- Black-winged cuckoo-shrike (Coracina melaschistos)
- Rosy minivet (Pericrocotus roseus)
- Small minivet (Pericrocotus cinnamomeus)
- Long-tailed minivet (Pericrocotus ethologus)
- Short-billed minivet (Pericrocotus brevirostris)
- Scarlet minivet (Pericrocotus flammeus)
- Black-naped monarch (Hypothymis azurea)
- Black drongo (Dicrurus macrocercus)
- Ashy drongo (Dicrurus leucophaeus)
- Bronzed drongo (Dicrurus aeneus)
- Lesser racket-tailed drongo (Dicrurus remifer)
- Spangled drongo (Dicrurus hottentottus)
- Greater racket-tailed drongo (Dicrurus paradiseus)
- Ferruginous flycatcher (Muscicapa ferruginea)
- Red-throated flycatcher (Ficedula parva)
- Little pied flycatcher (Ficedula westermanni)
- Slaty-blue flycatcher (Ficedula tricolor)
- Verditer flycatcher (Eumyias thalassina)
- Asian brown flycatcher (Muscicapa dauurica)
- White-throated fantail (Rhipidura albicollis)
- Large niltava (Niltava grandis)
- Small niltava (Niltava macgrigoriae)
- Rufous-bellied niltava (Niltava sundara)
- Pale-chinned blue flycatcher (Cyornis poliogenys)
- Blue-throated blue flycatcher (Cyornis rubeculoides)
- Grey-headed canary flycatcher (Culicicapa ceylonenisis)
- Asian paradise-flycatcher (Terpsiphone paradise)
- White-tailed rubythroat (Luscinia pectoralis)
- Oriental magpie robin (Copsychus saularis)
- White-rumped shama (Copychus malabaricus)
- Daurian redstart (Phoenicurus auroreus)
- White-tailed robin (Myiomela leucura)
- Common stonechat (Saxicola torquata)
- Grey bushchat (Saxicola ferrea)
- Blue rock thrush (Monticola solitarius)
- Scaly thrush (Zoothera dauma)
- Black-breasted thrush (Turdus dissimilis)
- Dark-throated thrush (Turdus ruficollis)
- Spot-winged starling (Saroglossa spiloptera)
- Chestnut-tailed starling (Sturnus malabaricus)
- Asian pied starling (Sturnus contra)
- Brahminy starling (Sturnus pagodarum)
- Common myna (Acridotheres tristis)
- Bank myna (Acridotheres ginginianus)
- Jungle myna (Acridotheres fuscus)
- White-vented myna (Acridotheres cinereus)
- Hill myna (Gracula religiosa)
- Chestnut-bellied nuthatch (Sitta castanea)
- Velvet-fronted nuthatch (Sitta frontalis)
- Great tit (Parus major)
- Sultan tit (Melanochloi sultanea)
- Plain martin (Riparia paludicola)
- Barn swallow (Hirundo rustica)
- Red-whiskered bulbul (Pynonotus jocosus)
- Red-vented bulbul (Pycnonotus cafer)
- White-throated bulbul (Alophoixux flaveolus)
- Ashy bulbul (Hemixox flavala)
- Black bulbul (Hypsipetes leucocephalus)
- Grey-breasted prinia (Prinia hodgsonii)
- Yellow-bellied prinia (Prinia flaviventris)
- Slaty-bellied tesia (Tesia olivea)
- Pale-footed bush warbler (Cettia pallidipes)
- Grey-sided bush warbler (Cettia brummifrons)
- Paddyfield warbler (Acrocephalus agricola)
- Common tailorbird (Orthotomus sutorius)
- Dusky warbler (Phylloscopus fuscatus)
- Smoky warbler (Phylloscopus fuligiventer)
- Tickell's leaf warbler (Phylloscopus affinis)
- Greenish warbler (Phylloscopus trochiloides)
- Yellow-vented warbler (Phylloscopus cantator)
- White-spectacled warbler (Zosterops palperbrosus)
- Lesser necklaced laughingthrush (Garrulax monileger)
- Greater necklaced laughingthrush (Garrulax pectoralis)
- Rufous-necked laughingthrush (Garrulax ruficollis)
- Abbott's babbler (Malacocincla abbotti)
- Buff-breasted babbler (Pellorneun tickelli)
- Puff-throated babbler (Pellorneun ruficeps)
- White-browed scimitar babbler (Pomatorhinus schisticeps)
- Grey-throated babbler (Stachyris nigriceps)
- Striped tit babbler (Macronous gularis)
- Yellow-eyed babbler (Chrysomma sinense)
- Chestnut-capped babbler (Timalia pileata)
- Rufous-winged bushlark (Mirafra assamica)
- Pale-billed flowerpecker (Dicaeum erythrorhynchos)
- Plain flowerpecker (Dicaeum minullum)
- Scarlet-backed flowerpecker (Dicaeum cruentatum)
- Thick-billed flowerpecker (Dicaeum agile)
- Ruby-cheeked sunbird (Anthreptes singalensis)
- Purple sunbird (Nectarinia asiatica)
- Crimson sunbird (Ethiopia sparaja)
- House sparrow (Passer domesticus)
- Eurasian tree sparrow (Passer montanus)
- White wagtail (Motacilla alba)
- Grey wagtail (Motacilla cinerea)
- Paddyfield pipit (Anthus rufulus)
- Olive-backed pipit (Anthus hodgsoni)
- Rosy pipit (Anthus roseatus)
- White-rumped munia (Lonchura striata)
- Scaly-breasted munia (Lonchura punctulata)
- Black-headed munia (Lonchura malacca)
