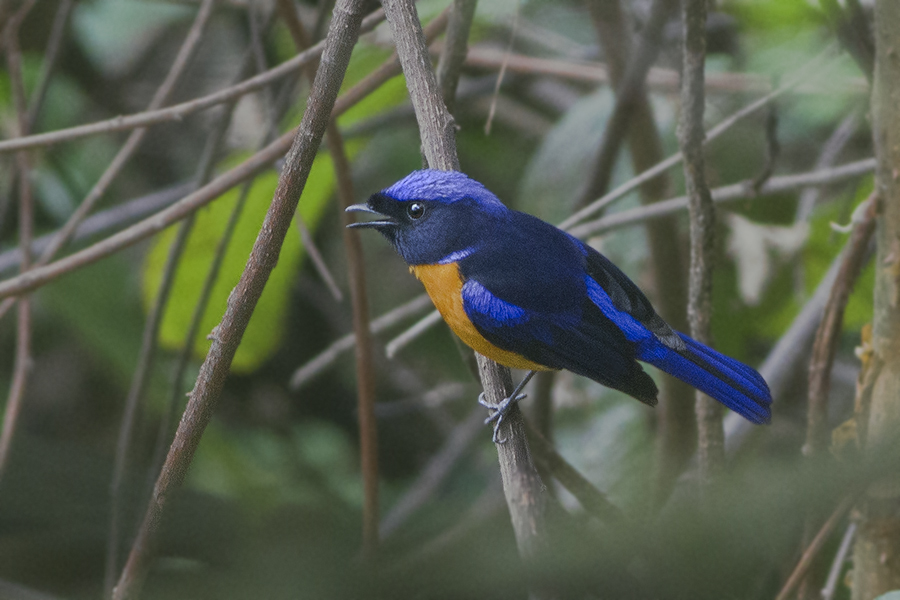
- Male
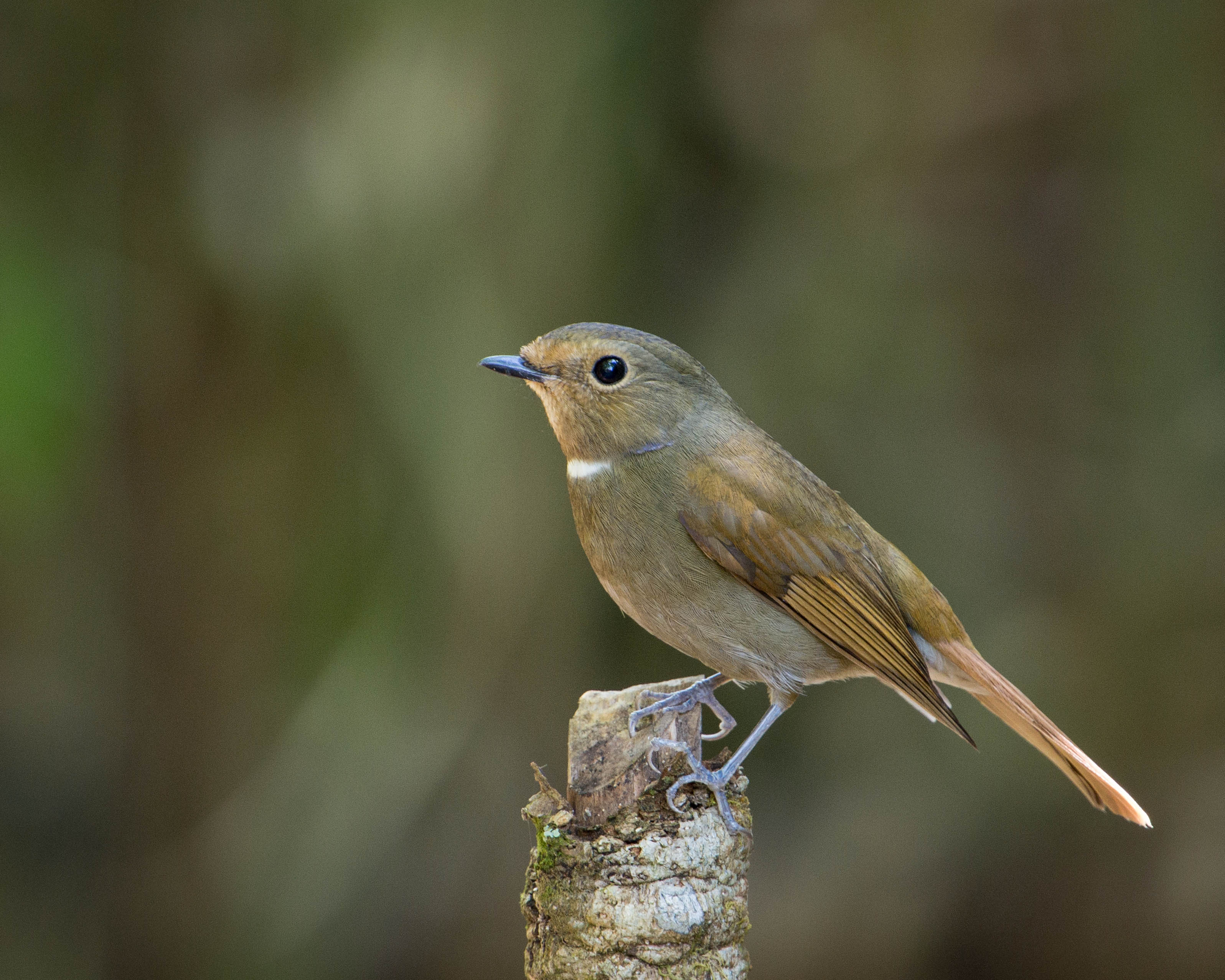
- Female both N. s. denotata Thailand

Conservation status
- Least Concern (IUCN 3.1)

Scientific classification
- Kingdom: Animalia
- Phylum: Chordata
- Class: Aves
- Order: Passeriformes
- Family: Muscicapidae
- Genus: Niltava
- Species: N. sundara

Binomial name
- Niltava sundara Hodgson, 1837

= Rufous-bellied niltava =

Species of bird

The rufous-bellied niltava (Niltava sundara) is a species of bird in the family Muscicapidae.

It is found in Bangladesh, Bhutan, China, India, Laos, Myanmar, Nepal, Pakistan, Thailand, and Vietnam. Its natural habitats are subtropical or tropical moist lowland forest and subtropical or tropical moist montane forest.

Rufous-bellied niltava measures 15–18 cm and weighs 19–24 g. It is a large, stocky and brightly coloured flycatcher with rounded head shape, fairly short tail and broad-based bill.

== Taxonomy and systematics ==
The rufous-breasted niltava is one of six species in the genus Niltava, found in South and Southeast Asia as well as in China. This bird has sometimes been considered to be conspecific with the Fujian niltava and rufous-vented niltava.

It was described by the English naturalist Brian Hodgson in 1837. The specific epithet sundara is a Latinised version of the Hindi word sundar, meaning "beautiful".

The bird has also been called the blue-and-orange niltava or black-and-orange niltava, as the male's blue upperparts may look black in poor light. Other names for the bird include orange-bellied niltava, beautiful niltava, or the sundara niltava.

=== Subspecies ===
N. s. sundara - (Hodgson, 1837): The nominate subspecies, it is found in the central and eastern Himalayas east from Nepal and from South China to Myanmar. Non-breeding individuals are also found northeastern Bangladesh.

N. s. whistleri - (Ticehurst, 1926): Found in the Himalayas in north India and Pakistan, extending eastward up until Uttarakhand. The subspecific epithet is in honour of Hugh Whistler. Males have paler underparts than that of the nominate, and females have a paler tail, upperparts, and more greyish-olive on their underparts.

N. s. denotata - (Bangs & Phillips, 1914): Found in eastern Myanmar, southern China, and northwestern Vietnam. Non-breeding individuals can be found further south to northern Thailand and Indochina. Males more violet-blue in colour than that of the nominate, with females having more olive-brown on the crown and nape, buff on forehead, rufous-brown on mantle and rufous on uppertail-coverts and tail edges.

== Ecology and behaviour ==
=== Diet ===
The rufous-breasted niltava is predominantly insectivorous. Its diet mainly consists of small invertebrates and larvae (especially ants and beetles), along with occasional consumption of fruit. Feeds by perching quietly in the undergrowth and darting out or dropping to the ground to catch prey. Rufous-breasted niltavas tend to feed either solitarily or in pairs, sometimes joining mixed-species flocks. It tends to be more solitary in winter.

== Gallery ==
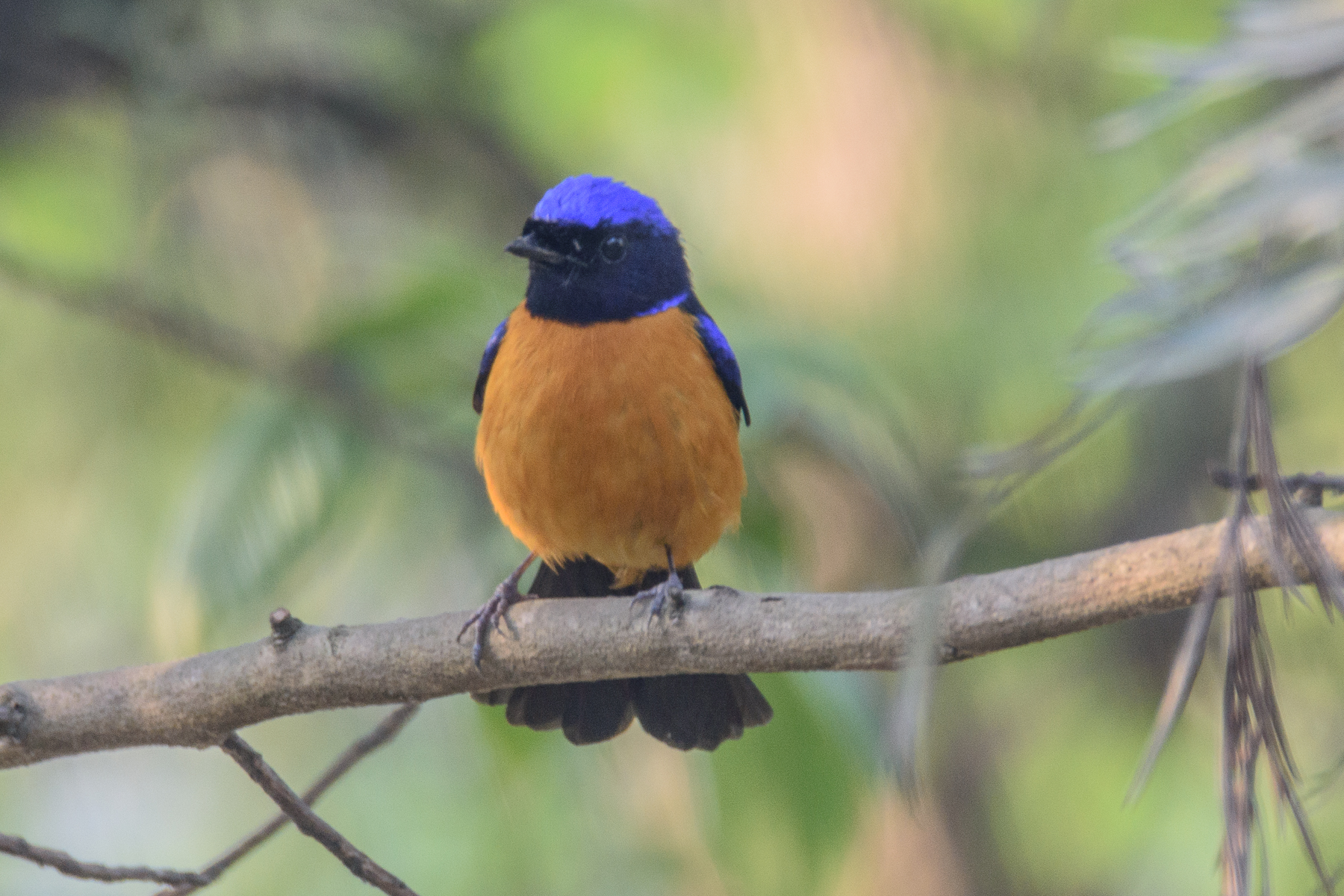
male N.s. sundara, Nepal

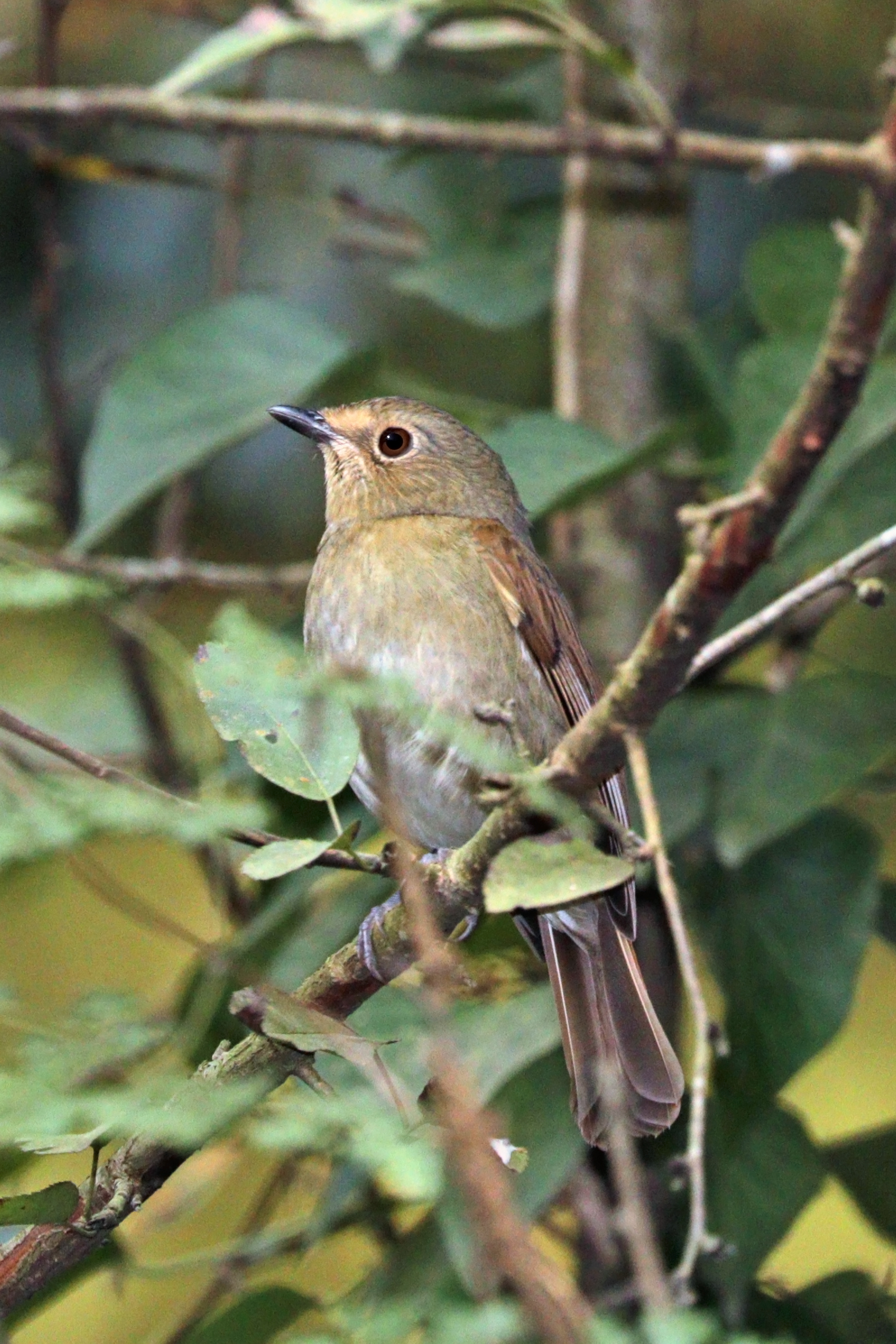
female N.s. sundara, Nepal
