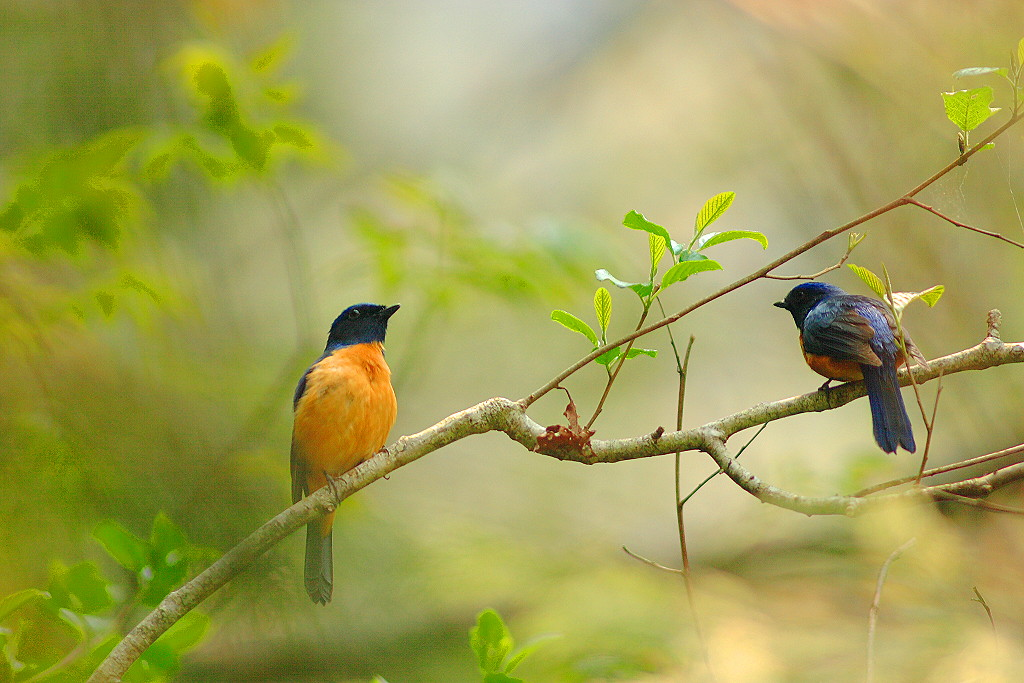
- Taiwan vivid niltava (Niltava vivida)

Scientific classification
- Kingdom: Animalia
- Phylum: Chordata
- Class: Aves
- Order: Passeriformes
- Family: Muscicapidae
- Genus: Niltava; Hodgson, 1837

Type species
- Niltava sundara Hodgson, 1837

= Niltava =

Genus of birds

Niltava (from niltau, Nepali for the rufous-bellied niltava) is a genus of passerine birds in the Old World flycatcher family Muscicapidae. They are found in found in South and Southeast Asia as well as in China. The seven species in the genus are sexually dimorphic. The males have blue upperparts and all except the large niltava have orange-rufous underparts. The females are less brightly coloured and have brown upperparts and buffish underparts.

== Taxonomy ==
The genus Niltava was introduced in 1837 by the English naturalist Brian Hodgson with the rufous-bellied niltava (Niltava sundara) as the type species. The genus name is from the Nepali word Niltau for the rufous-bellied niltava.

The genus contains the following seven species:

Image	Common name	Scientific name
	Fujian niltava	Niltava davidi
	Rufous-bellied niltava	Niltava sundara
	Rufous-vented niltava	Niltava sumatrana
	Chinese vivid niltava	Niltava oatesi
	Taiwan vivid niltava	Niltava vivida
	Large niltava	Niltava grandis
	Small niltava	Niltava macgrigoriae
