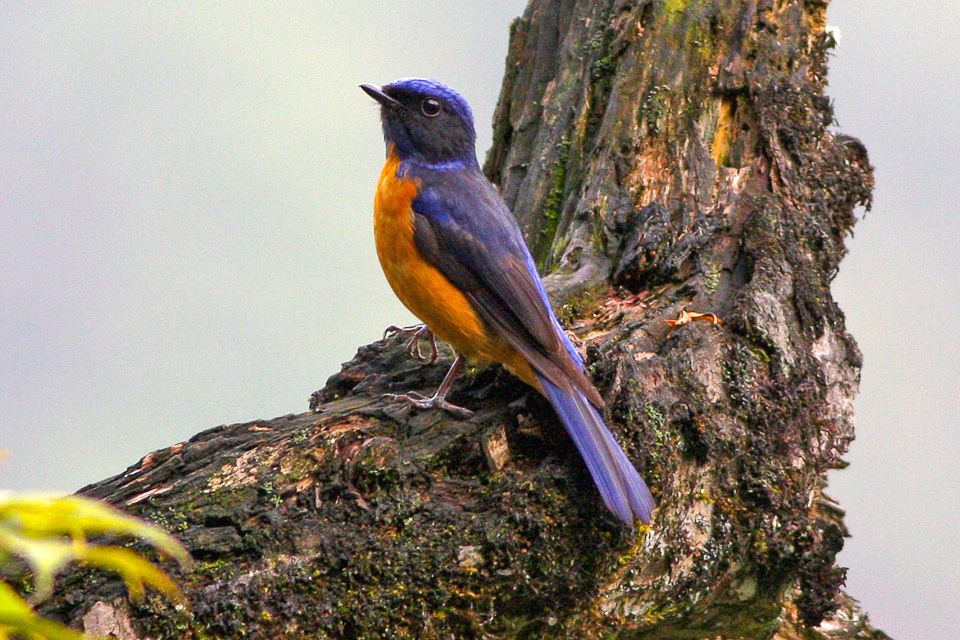

Conservation status
- Least Concern (IUCN 3.1)

Scientific classification
- Kingdom: Animalia
- Phylum: Chordata
- Class: Aves
- Order: Passeriformes
- Family: Muscicapidae
- Genus: Niltava
- Species: N. oatesi

Binomial name
- Niltava oatesi Salvadori, 1887

= Chinese vivid niltava =

Species of bird

The Chinese vivid niltava (Niltava oatesi) is a species of bird in the family Muscicapidae. It is found in the eastern Himalayas to southern China. The Chinese vivid niltava was formerly considered conspecific to the Taiwan vivid niltava (N. vivida). Its natural habitat is subtropical or tropical moist montane forests.
