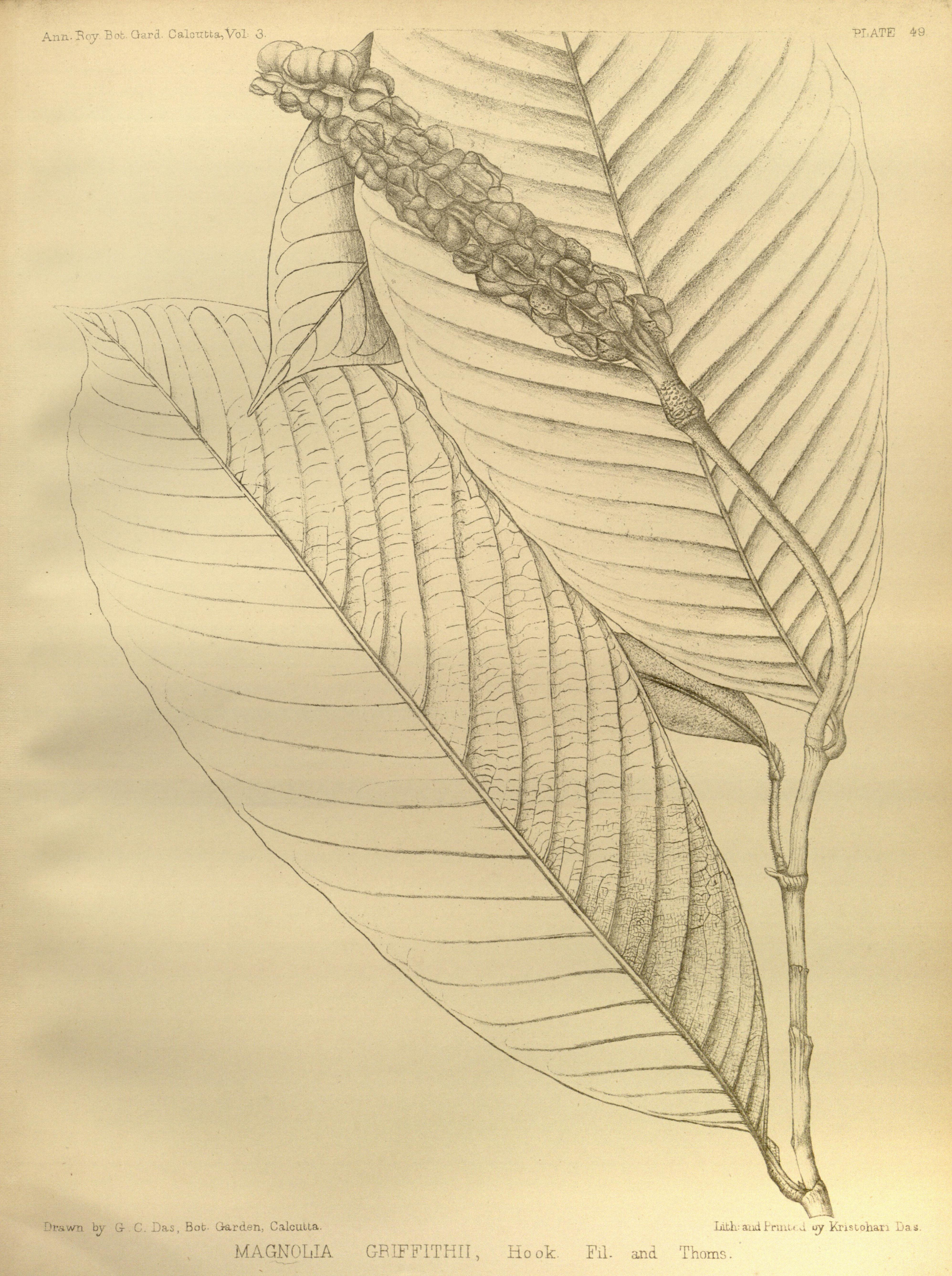

Conservation status
- Data Deficient (IUCN 3.1)

Scientific classification
- Kingdom: Plantae
- Clade: Embryophytes
- Clade: Tracheophytes
- Clade: Spermatophytes
- Clade: Angiosperms
- Clade: Magnoliids
- Order: Magnoliales
- Family: Magnoliaceae
- Genus: Magnolia
- Subgenus: Magnolia subg. Yulania
- Section: Magnolia sect. Michelia
- Subsection: Magnolia subsect. Maingola
- Species: M. griffithii

Binomial name
- Magnolia griffithii Hook.f. & Thomson

Synonyms
- Aromadendron griffithii (Hook.f. & Thomson) Sima & S.G.Lu; Michelia griffithii (Hook.f. & Thomson) Finet & Gagnep.

= Magnolia griffithii =

Species of flowering plant

Magnolia griffithii is a species of flowering plant in the family Magnoliaceae. It is a tree native to Bangladesh, northeastern India including Arunachal Pradesh and Assam, and northern Myanmar.
