= Rufous-vented niltava =

Conservation status
- Least Concern (IUCN 3.1)

Scientific classification
- Kingdom: Animalia
- Phylum: Chordata
- Class: Aves
- Order: Passeriformes
- Family: Muscicapidae
- Genus: Niltava
- Species: N. sumatrana

Binomial name
- Niltava sumatrana Salvadori, 1879

Species of bird

The rufous-vented niltava (Niltava sumatrana) is a species of bird in the family Muscicapidae. It is found in Sumatra and the Malay Peninsula. Its natural habitat is subtropical or tropical moist montane forests.
