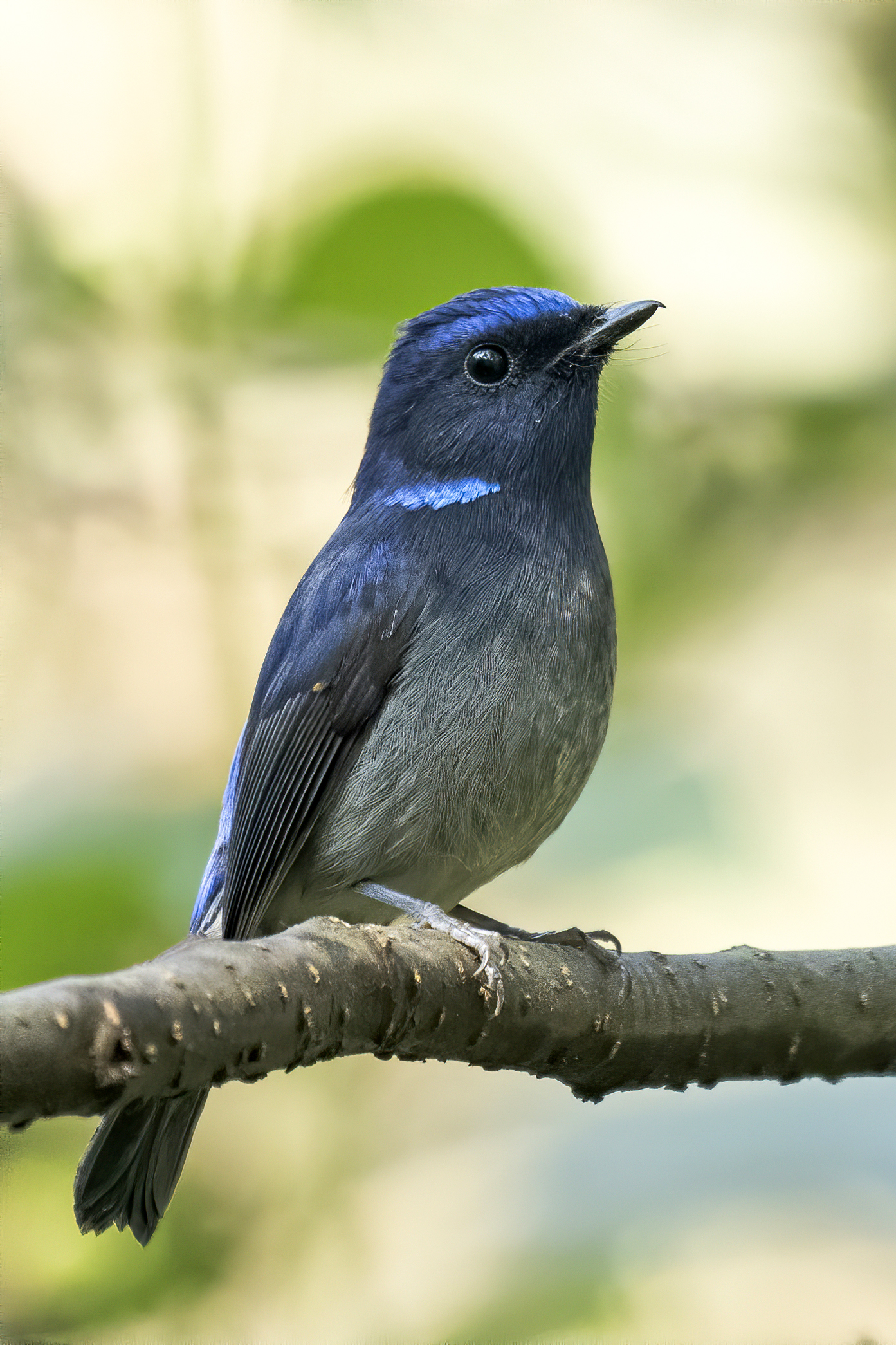
- Male in Nepal
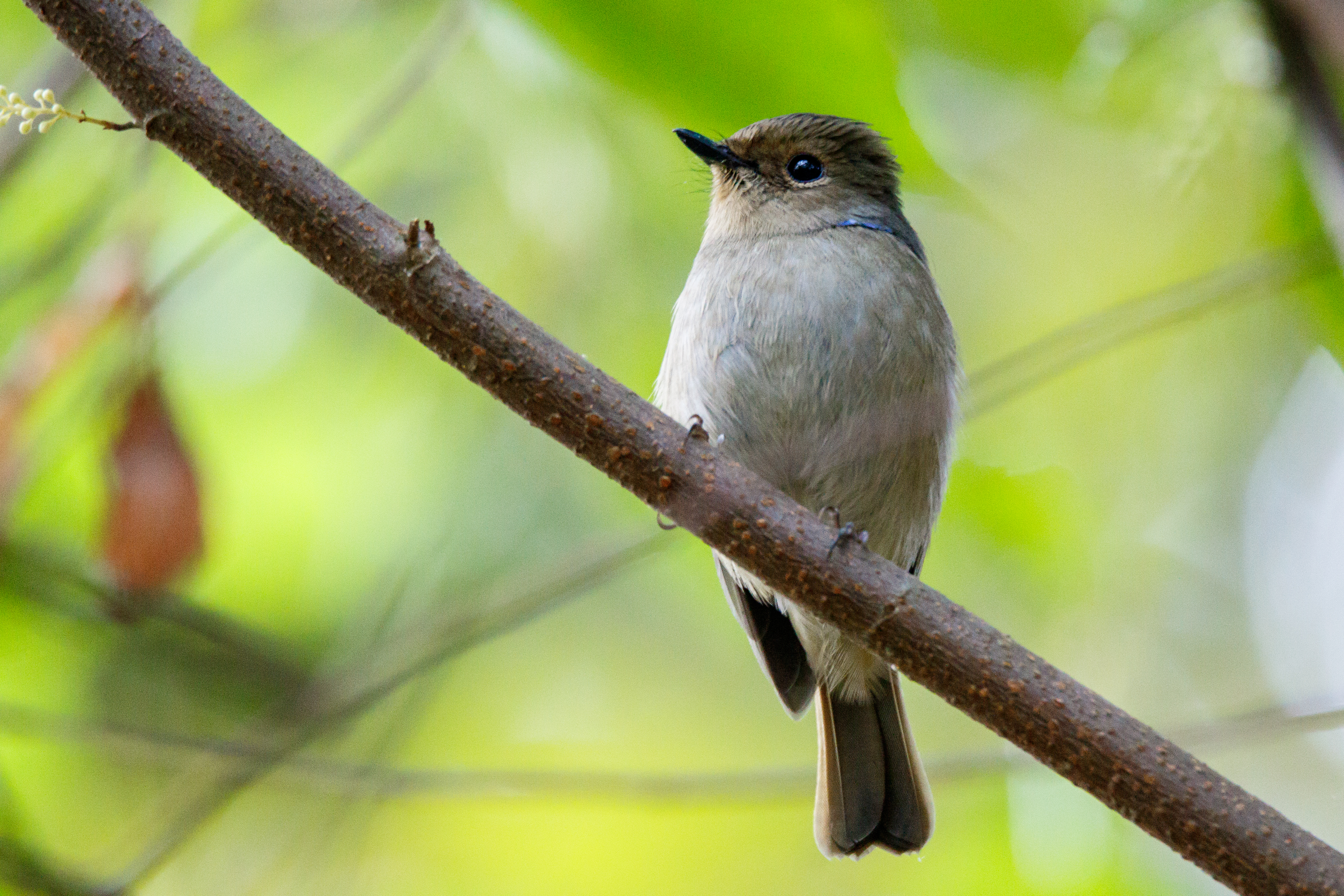
- Female in Nepal

Conservation status
- Least Concern (IUCN 3.1)

Scientific classification
- Kingdom: Animalia
- Phylum: Chordata
- Class: Aves
- Order: Passeriformes
- Family: Muscicapidae
- Genus: Niltava
- Species: N. macgrigoriae

Binomial name
- Niltava macgrigoriae (Burton, 1836)

= Small niltava =

Species of bird

The small niltava (Niltava macgrigoriae) is a species of bird in the family Muscicapidae, native to the Indian subcontinent and Southeast Asia. It is found in Bangladesh, Bhutan, India, Laos, Myanmar, Nepal, Thailand, Tibet and Vietnam. Its natural habitat is subtropical or tropical moist montane forests.

== Taxonomy and systematics ==
=== Subspecies ===
- N. m. macgrogoriae - (Burton, 1836): The nominate subspecies, found in the central and western Himalayas from Uttarakhand to Sikkim and West Bengal.
- N. m. signata - (McClelland, 1840): Found in Northeast India, Myanmar, southern China, north Thailand, and continental Southeast Asia. Non-breeding individuals are also found in coastal Guangdong. Males tend to have a greyer belly and underside than the nominate.

== Behaviour and ecology ==
=== Diet ===
Eats small invertebrates and fruits.

== Gallery ==
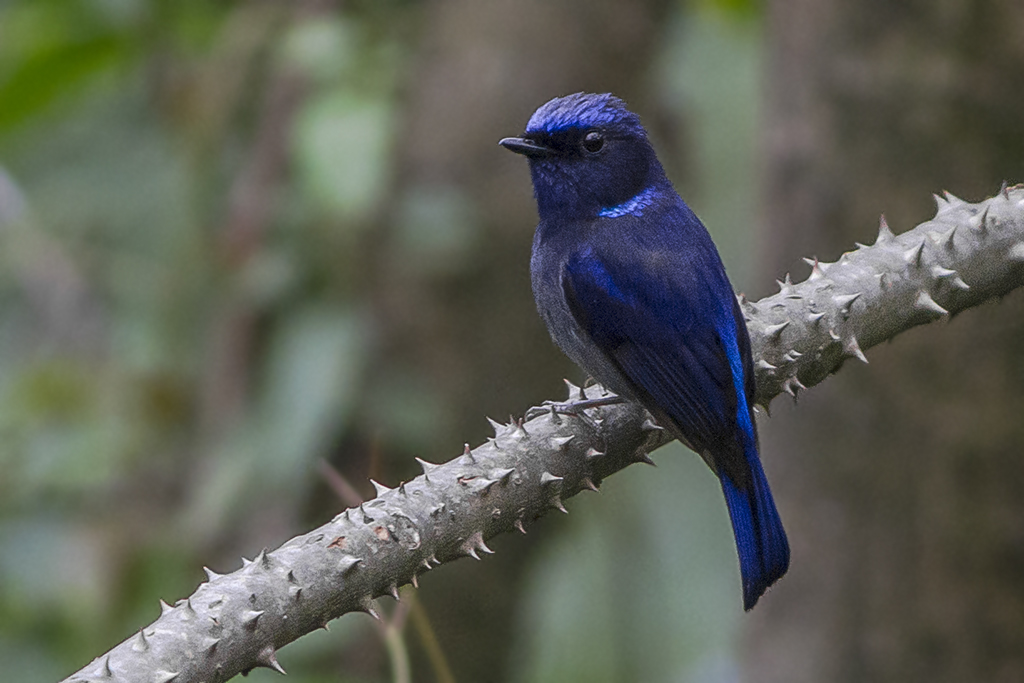
Male Niltava macgrigoriae from Pangolakha Wildlife Sanctuary, Sikkim, India

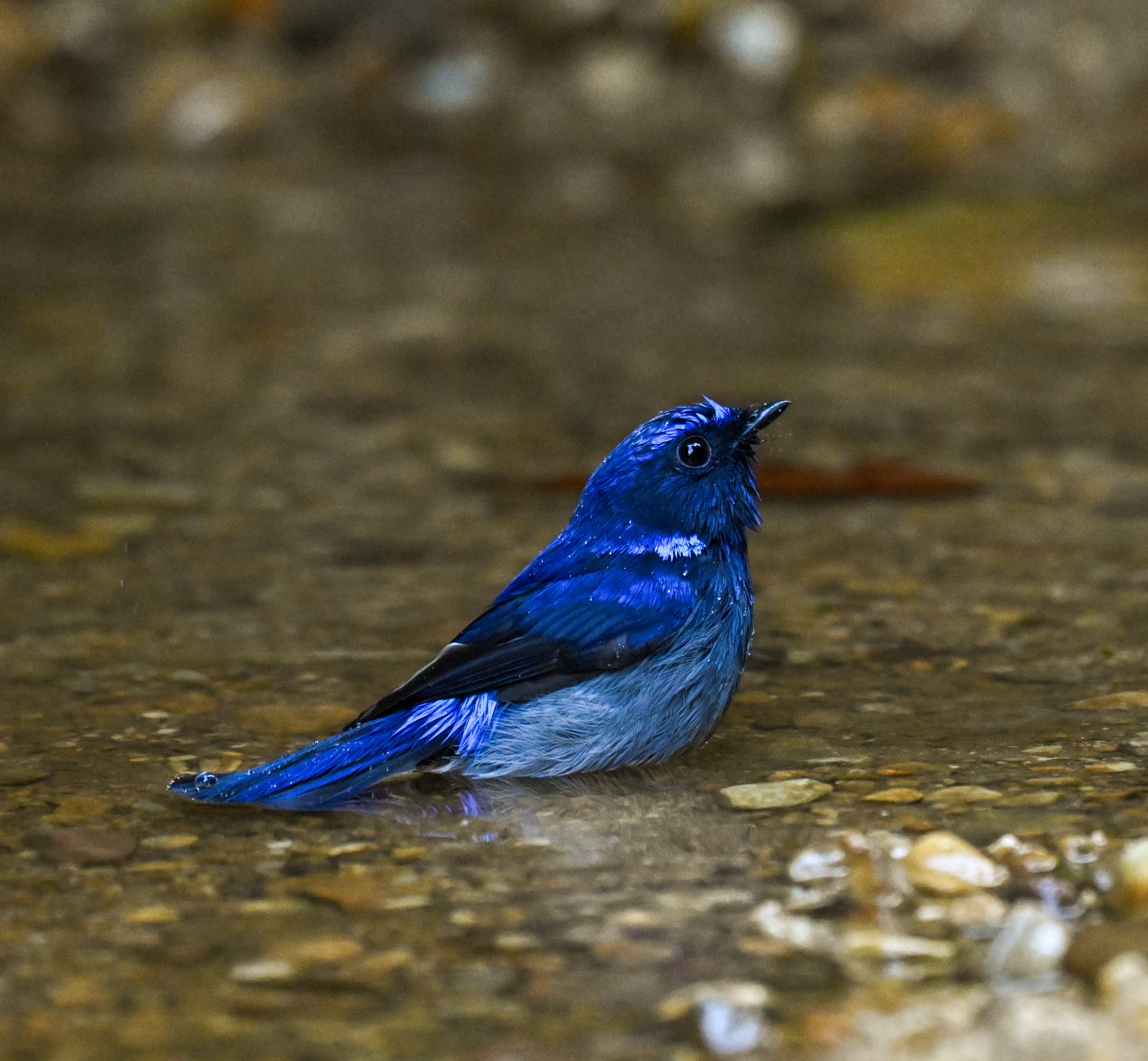
Niltava ,Dullung Reserve Forest, Assam
