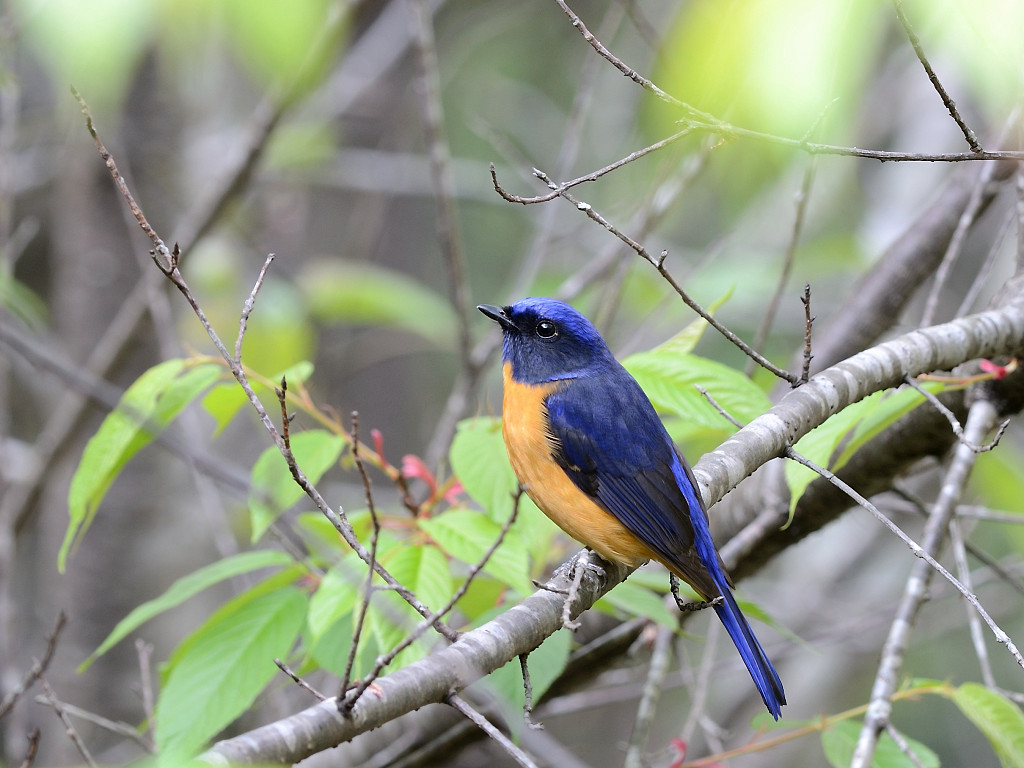
- In Taichun City, Taiwan

Conservation status
- Least Concern (IUCN 3.1)

Scientific classification
- Kingdom: Animalia
- Phylum: Chordata
- Class: Aves
- Order: Passeriformes
- Family: Muscicapidae
- Genus: Niltava
- Species: N. vivida

Binomial name
- Niltava vivida (R. Swinhoe, 1864)

= Taiwan vivid niltava =

Species of bird

The Taiwan vivid niltava (Niltava vivida) or small vivid niltava is a bird in the family Muscicapidae. The species was first described by Robert Swinhoe in 1864. It is endemic to Taiwan. The Chinese vivid niltava (N. oatesi) of the Asian mainland, which is larger in size, was formerly considered conspecific. Its natural habitat is subtropical or tropical moist montane forests.

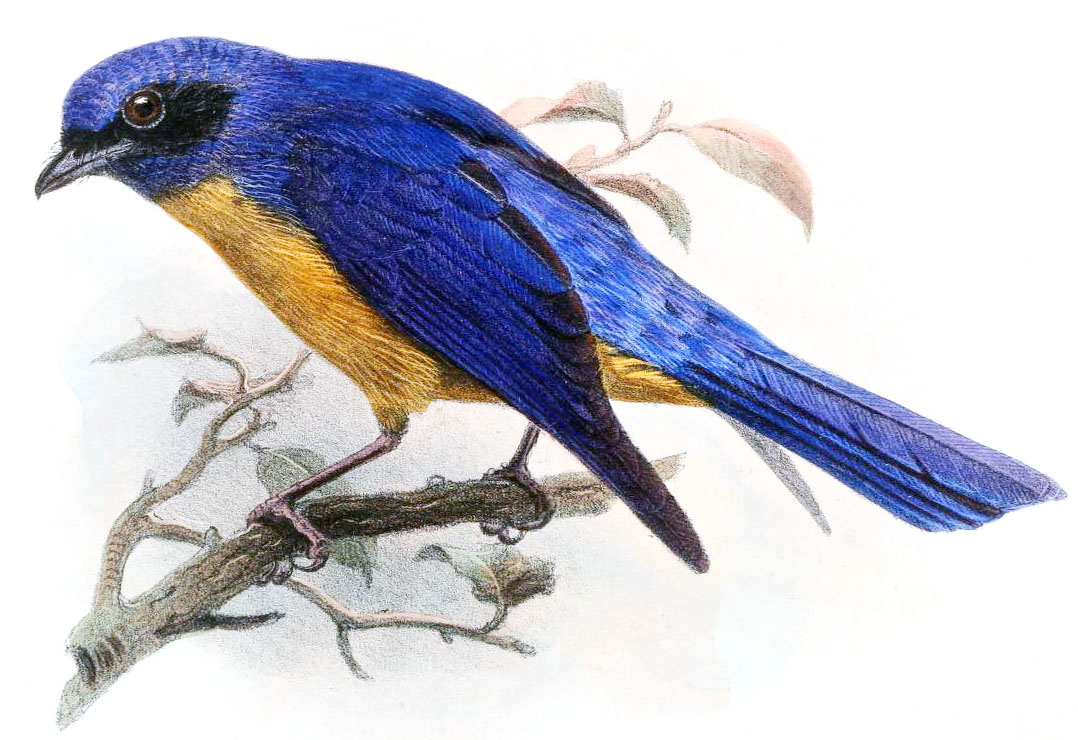
Illustration by Joseph Wolf

The Taiwan vivid niltava is a medium-sized (16 cm) member of the Old World flycatcher family, has a deep purplish blue on the head, back, tail and lesser wing coverts, and bright rufous orange below. Its throat, face, wings and iris are black as are its legs and bill. The female is olive brown overall, lighter below, with a light buffy throat and greyish-brown crown and nape. As do many members of its family, the small vivid niltava bears distinct rictal bristles at the base of its bill.
