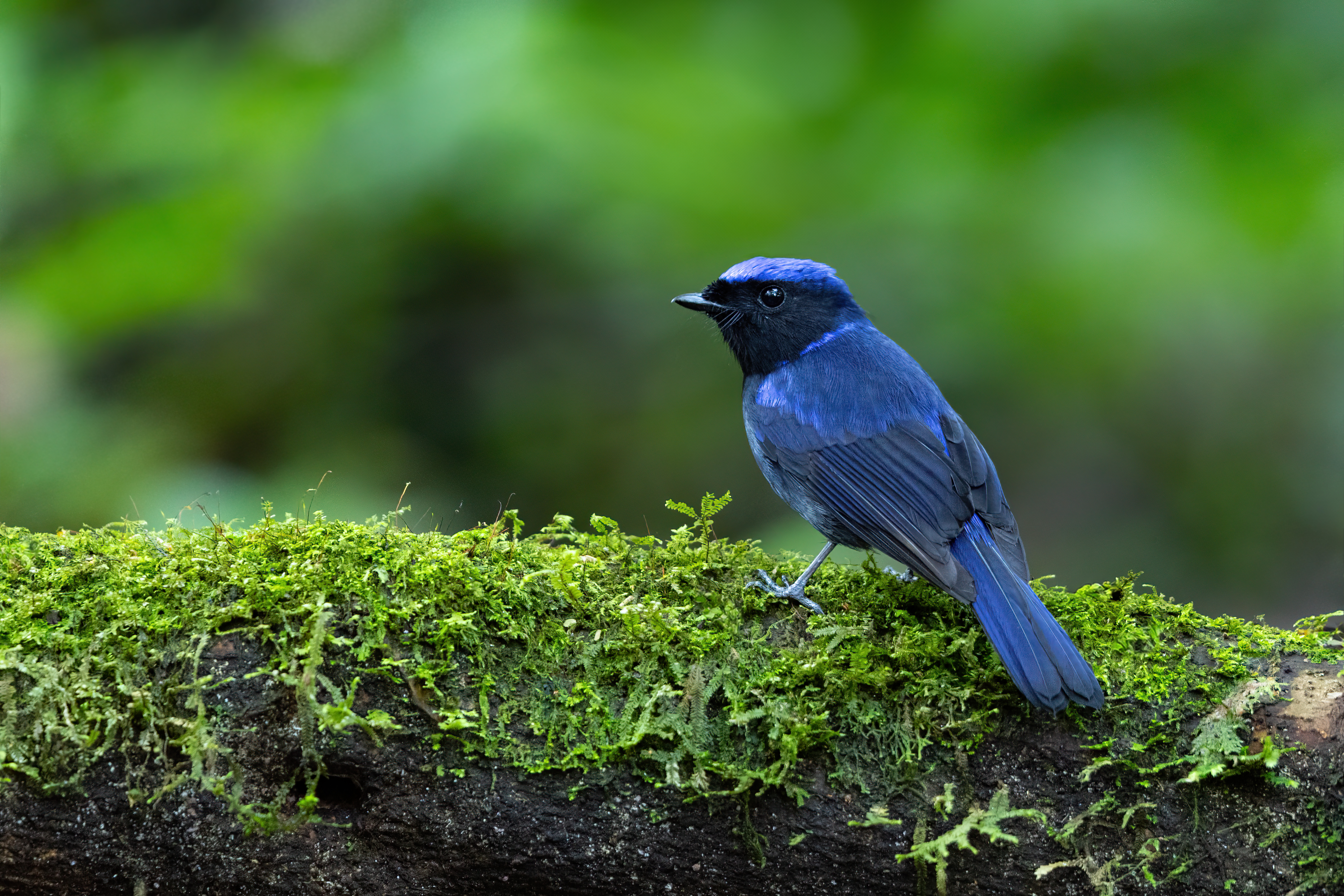
- Male from Sumatra, Indonesia
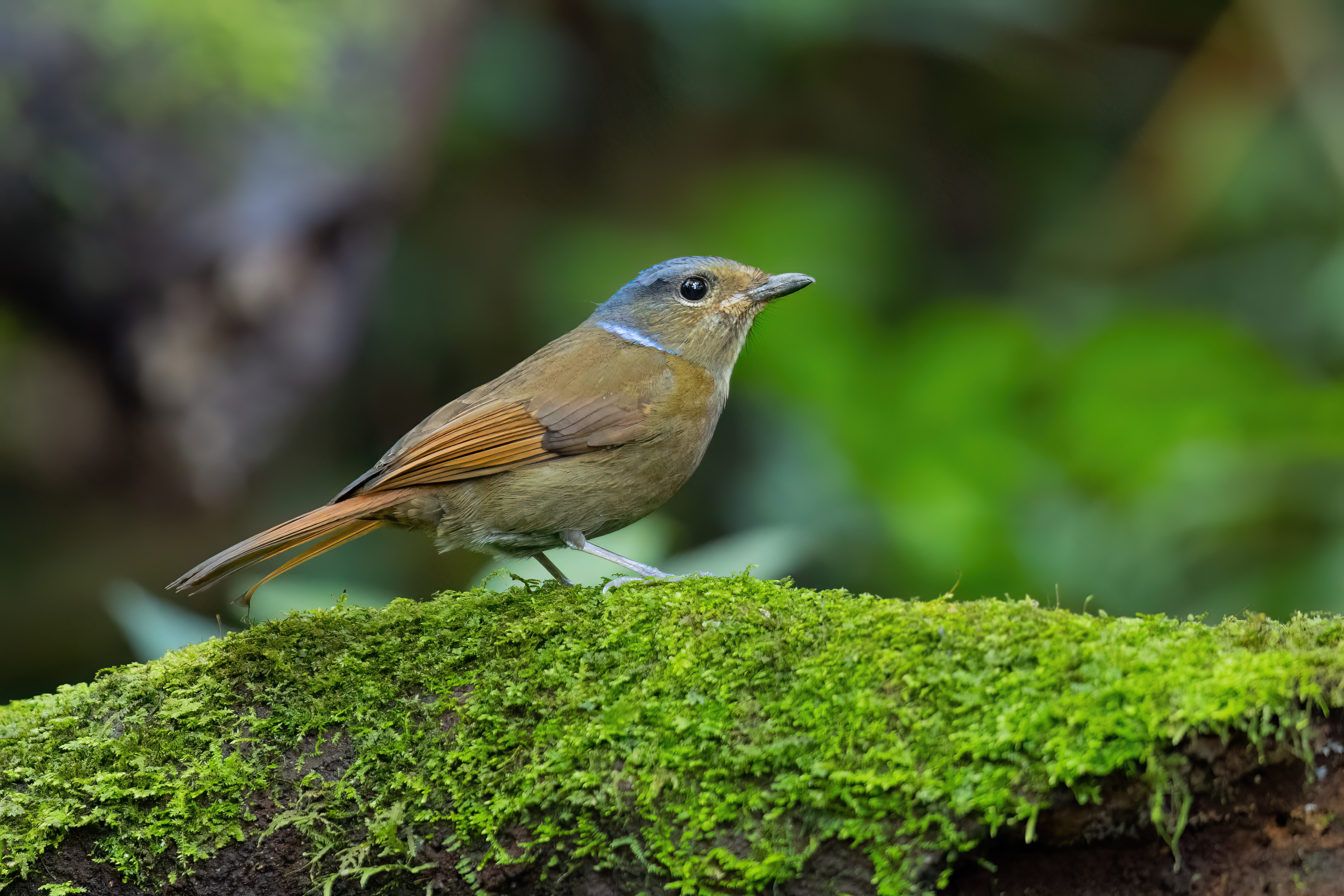
- Female from Sumatra, Indonesia

Conservation status
- Least Concern (IUCN 3.1)

Scientific classification
- Kingdom: Animalia
- Phylum: Chordata
- Class: Aves
- Order: Passeriformes
- Family: Muscicapidae
- Genus: Niltava
- Species: N. grandis

Binomial name
- Niltava grandis (Blyth, 1842)

= Large niltava =

Species of bird

The large niltava (Niltava grandis) is a species of bird in the Old world flycatcher family Muscicapidae. It is found in Bangladesh, Bhutan, Cambodia, China, India, Indonesia, Laos, Malaysia, Myanmar, Nepal, Thailand and Vietnam. Its natural habitat is subtropical or tropical montane forests.

== Taxonomy ==
The large niltava was formally described in 1842 by the English zoologist Edward Blyth based on specimens collected in Darjeeling, India. He coined the binomial name Chaïtaris grandis. The large niltava is now placed with six other niltavas in the genus Niltava that was introduced in 1837 by the English naturalist Brian Hodgson.

Four subspecies are recognised:

- N. g. grandis (Blyth, 1842) – east Himalayas to southwest China, central Myanmar and north, west Thailand
- N. g. griseiventris La Touche, 1921 – south China and north Indochina
- N. g. decorata Robinson & Kloss, 1919 – central south Vietnam
- N. g. decipiens Salvadori, 1891 – montane Malay Peninsula and Sumatra

== Gallery ==
Male Fraser's Hill, Malaysia 1997

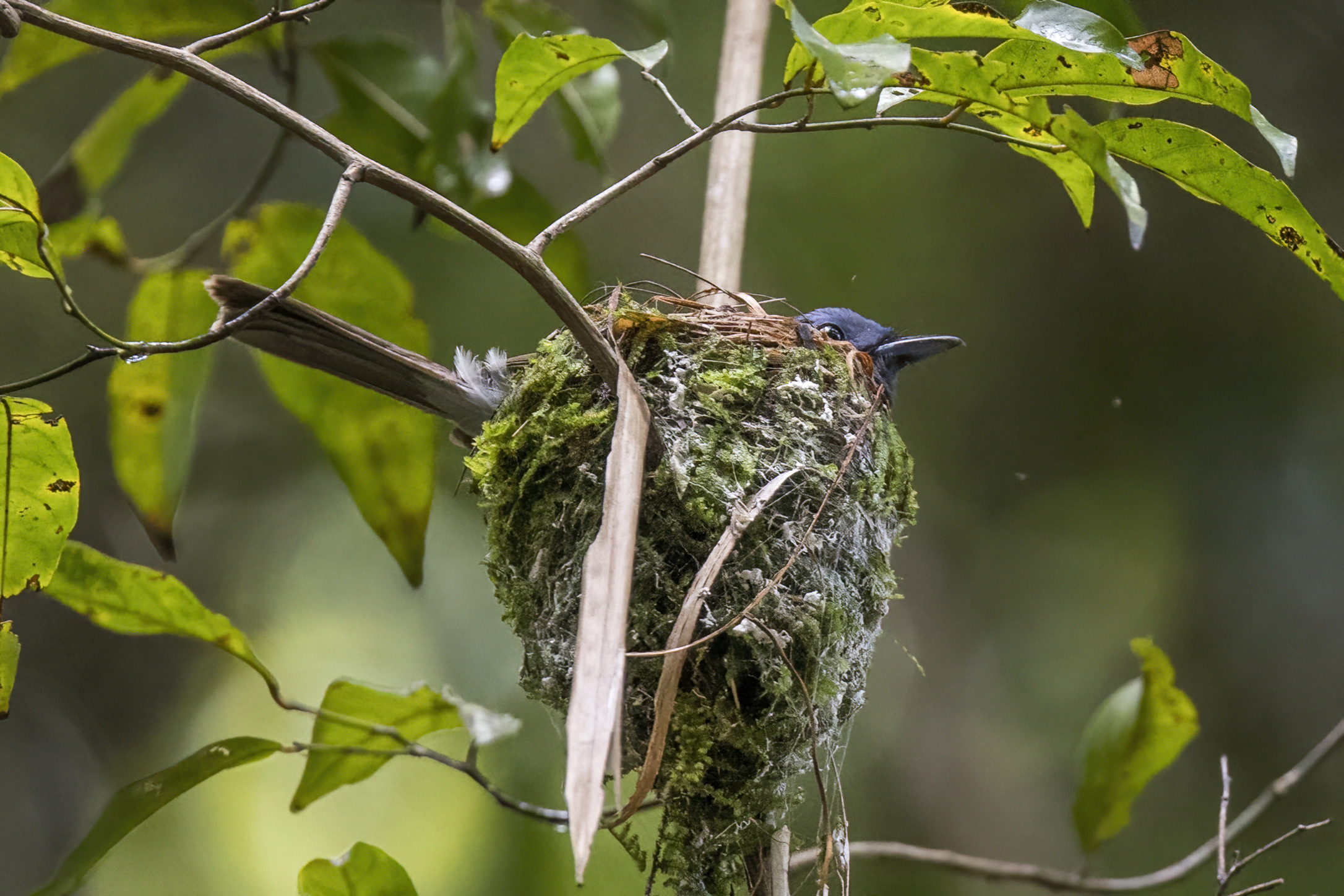
on nest, Thailand
