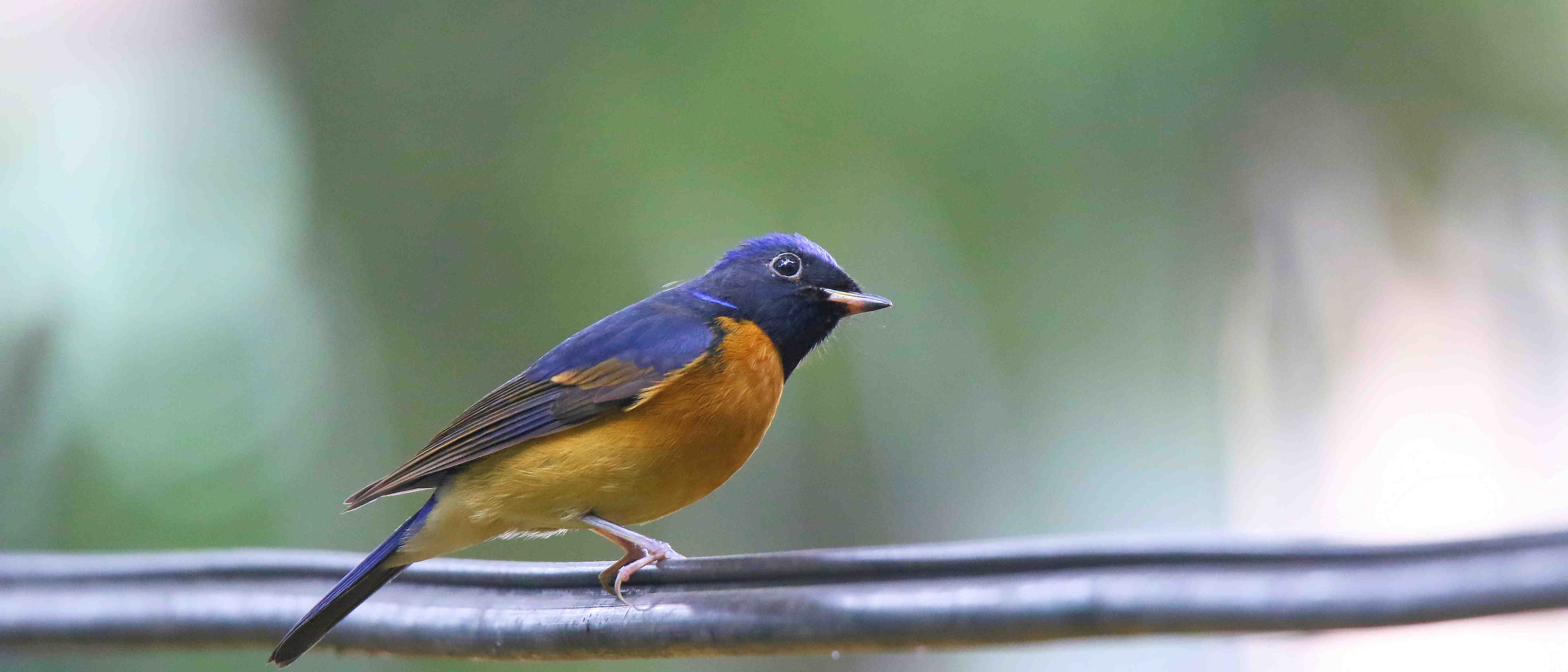
- Male
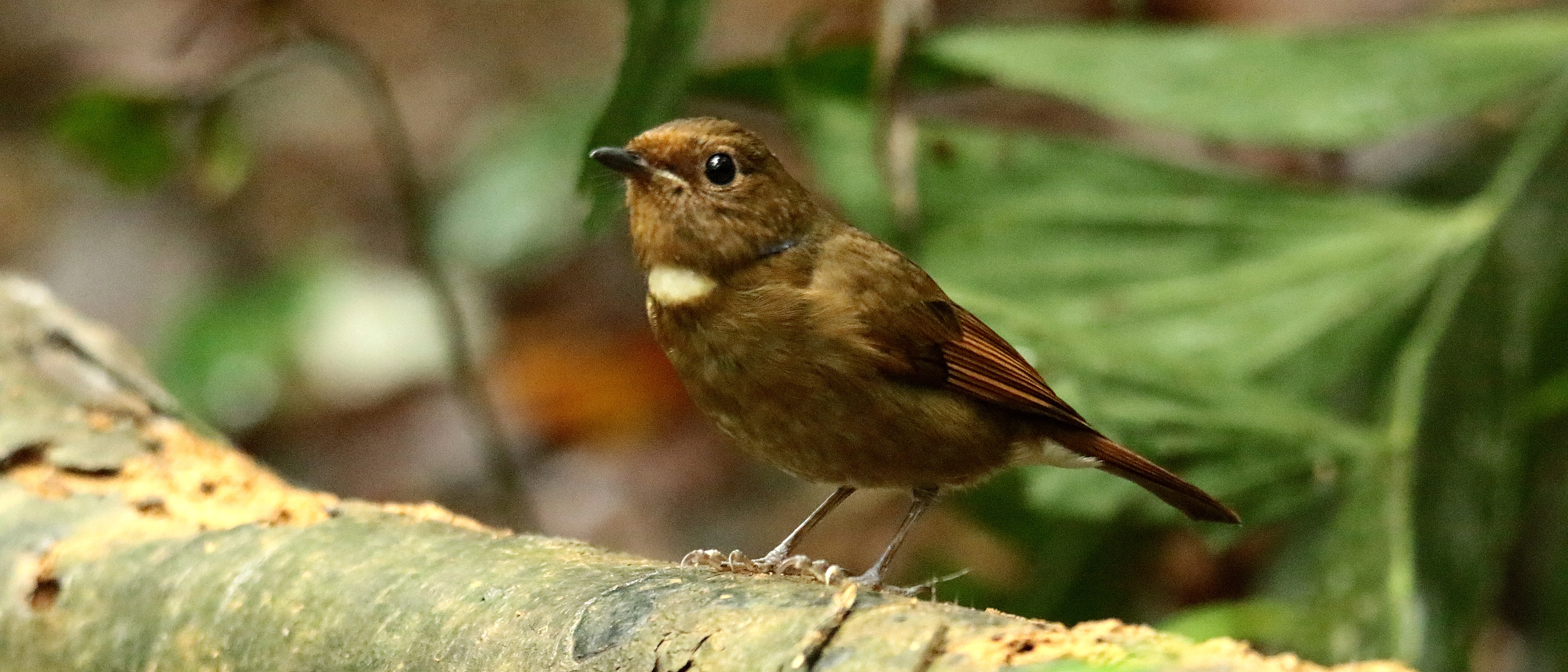
- Female

Conservation status
- Least Concern (IUCN 3.1)

Scientific classification
- Kingdom: Animalia
- Phylum: Chordata
- Class: Aves
- Order: Passeriformes
- Family: Muscicapidae
- Genus: Niltava
- Species: N. davidi

Binomial name
- Niltava davidi La Touche, 1907

= Fujian niltava =

Species of bird

The Fujian niltava (Niltava davidi) is a species of bird in the family Muscicapidae. It is found in Cambodia, southern China (including Hong Kong), Laos, Thailand, and Vietnam. Its natural habitats are subtropical or tropical moist lowland forest and subtropical or tropical moist montane forest.
