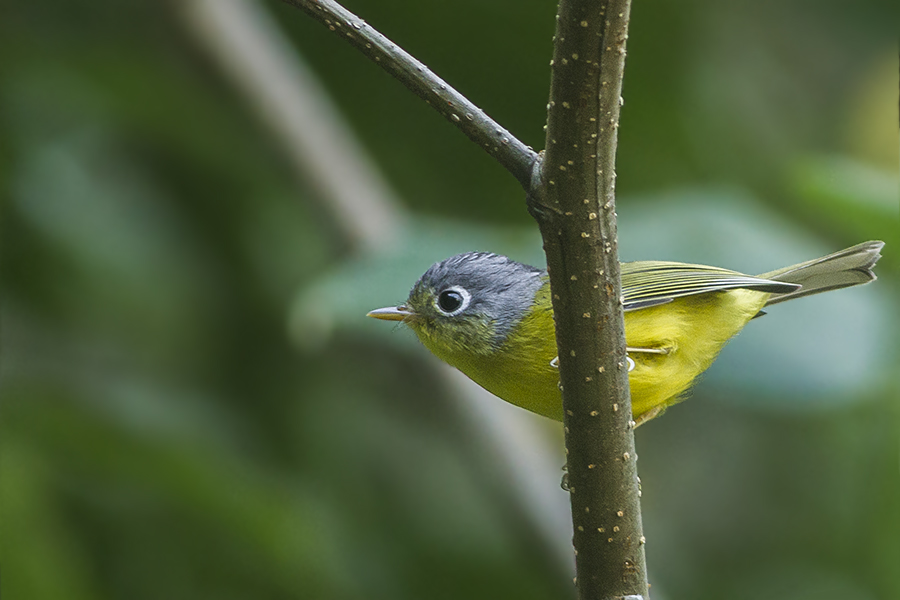
- From Khangchendzonga National Park, West Sikkim, India.

Conservation status
- Least Concern (IUCN 3.1)

Scientific classification
- Kingdom: Animalia
- Phylum: Chordata
- Class: Aves
- Order: Passeriformes
- Family: Phylloscopidae
- Genus: Phylloscopus
- Species: P. intermedius

Binomial name
- Phylloscopus intermedius (La Touche, 1898)

Synonyms
- Seicercus affinis (Moore, 1854)

= White-spectacled warbler =

Species of bird

The white-spectacled warbler (Phylloscopus intermedius) is a species of leaf warbler in the family Phylloscopidae. It is found in Asia from the eastern Himalayas to south-eastern China and southern Vietnam. Its natural habitats are subtropical or tropical moist lowland forests and subtropical or tropical moist montane forests. It was formerly included in the Old World warbler family, Sylviidae.

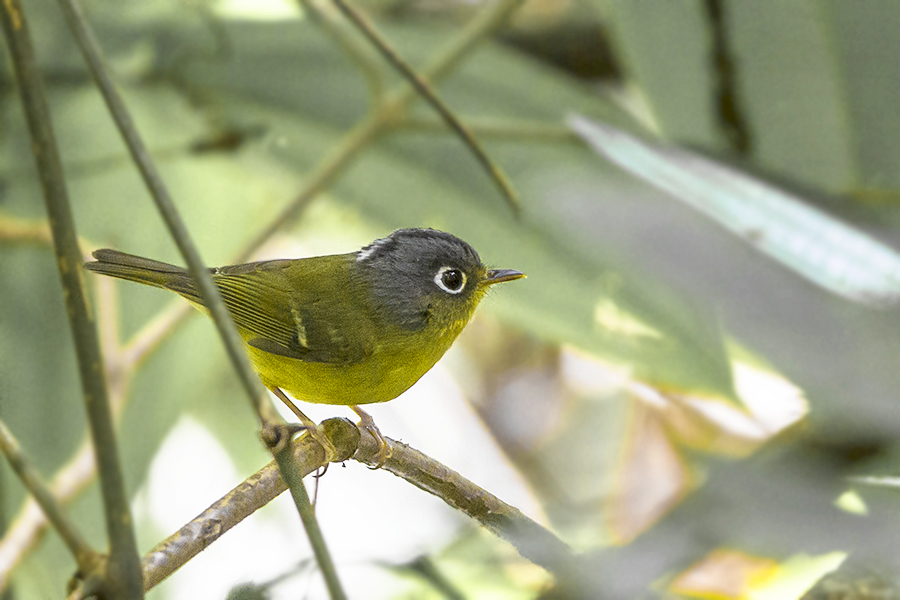
White-spectacled warbler from Nimachen, Sikkim, India.

The white-spectacled warbler was described by the English entomologist and ornithologist Frederic Moore in 1854 and given the binomial name Abrornis affinis. In 1898 the Irish ornithologist John David Digues La Touche described another bird to which he gave the binomial name Cryptolopha intermedia. These two taxa were subsequently considered to belong to the same species and were placed in the genus Seicercus. A molecular phylogenetic study published in 2018 found that neither Seicercus nor the closely related genus Phylloscopus were monophyletic. In the subsequent reorganization the two genera were merged into Phylloscopus which had priority under the rules of the International Commission on Zoological Nomenclature (ICZN). Before the merger, the nominate subspecies was Seicercus affinis affinis (Moore, F., 1854) but within the enlarged genus the name affinis was occupied by Tickell's leaf warbler Phylloscopus affinis (Tickell, 1833) which had priority. A new name zosterops was introduced to replace affinis, but under the rules of the ICZN the subspecies intermedius now had priority and became the nominate form.

Three subspecies are recognised:

- P. i. zosterops Elliott & del Hoyo, 2016 – east Himalayas to south China, north Laos and central Vietnam
- P. i. intermedius (La Touche, 1898) – central and southeast China
- P. i. ocularis (Robinson & Kloss, 1919) – south Vietnam
