= List of birds of South Asia: part 2 =

This list includes those birds of South Asia in the non-passerine families other than the Megapodes, Galliformes, Gruiformes and near passerines.

Status abbreviations
R = widespread resident	r = very local resident	W = widespread winter visitor
w = sparse winter visitor	P = widespread migrant	p = sparse migrant
V = vagrant or irregular visitor	I = introduced resident	Ex = extinct
C = critically endangered	E = endangered	V = vulnerable
D = conservation dependent	N = near threatened	

For an introduction to the birds of the region, see List of birds of the South Asia.

For the rest of the species lists, see:

- part 1 – Megapodes, Galliformes, Gruiformes and near passerines
- part 3 – passerines from pittas to cisticolas
- part 4 – passerines from Old World warblers to buntings

== Pterocliformes ==
- Family: Pteroclidae
  - Tibetan sandgrouse, Syrrhaptes tibetanus – r
  - Pallas's sandgrouse, Syrrhaptes paradoxus – V
  - Pin-tailed sandgrouse, Pterocles alchata – W
  - Chestnut-bellied sandgrouse, Pterocles exustus – r
  - Spotted sandgrouse, Pterocles senegallus – W
  - Black-bellied sandgrouse, Pterocles orientalis – r w
  - Crowned sandgrouse, Pterocles coronatus
  - Painted sandgrouse, Pterocles indicus – r
  - Lichtenstein's sandgrouse, Pterocles lichtensteinii – r

== Charadriiformes ==
- Family: Scolopacidae
  - Eurasian woodcock, Scolopax rusticola – r W
  - Solitary snipe, Gallinago solitaria – r
  - Wood snipe, Gallinago nemoricola – V r
  - Pintail snipe, Gallinago stenura – W
  - Swinhoe's snipe, Gallinago megala – W
  - Great snipe, Gallinago media – V
  - Common snipe, Gallinago gallinago – r W
  - Jack snipe, Lymnocryptes minimus – W
  - Black-tailed godwit, Limosa limosa – W
  - Bar-tailed godwit, Limosa lapponica – W
  - Whimbrel, Numenius phaeopus – W
  - Eurasian curlew, Numenius arquata – W
  - Far Eastern curlew, Numenius madagascariensis
  - Spotted redshank, Tringa erythropus – W
  - Common redshank, Tringa totanus – s W
  - Marsh sandpiper, Tringa stagnatilis – W
  - Common greenshank, Tringa nebularia – W
  - Nordmann's greenshank, Tringa guttifer – E V
  - Green sandpiper, Tringa ochropus – W
  - Wood sandpiper, Tringa glareola – W
  - Terek sandpiper, Xenus cinereus – W
  - Common sandpiper, Actitis hypoleucos – s W
  - Grey-tailed tattler, Heteroscelus brevipes
  - Ruddy turnstone, Arenaria interpres – W
  - Long billed dowitcher, Limnodromus scolopaceus
  - Asian dowitcher, Limnodromus semipalmatus – N W
  - Great knot, Calidris tenuirostris – W
  - Red knot, Calidris canutus – W
  - Sanderling, Calidris alba – W
  - Spoon-billed sandpiper, Eurynorhynchus pygmeus – V w
  - Little stint, Calidris minuta – W
  - Red-necked stint, Calidris ruficollis – W
  - Temminck's stint, Calidris temminckii – W
  - Long-toed stint, Calidris subminuta – W
  - Sharp-tailed sandpiper, Calidris acuminata – V
  - Pectoral sandpiper, Calidris melanotos – V
  - Dunlin, Calidris alpina – W
  - Curlew sandpiper, Calidris ferruginea – W
  - Buff-breasted sandpiper, Tryngites subruficollis – V
  - Broad-billed sandpiper, Limicola falcinellus – W
  - Ruff, Philomachus pugnax – W
  - Red-necked phalarope, Phalaropus lobatus – W
  - Grey phalarope, Phalaropus fulicaria – V
- Family: Rostratulidae
  - Greater painted-snipe, Rostratula benghalensis – r
- Family: Jacanidae
  - Pheasant-tailed jacana, Hydrophasianus chirurgus – R
  - Bronze-winged jacana, Metopidius indicus – R
- Family: Burhinidae
  - Stone curlew, Burhinus oedicnemus – R
  - Great thick-knee, Esacus recurvirostris – r
  - Beach thick-knee, Esacus neglectus – N r
- Family Haematopodidae
  - Eurasian oystercatcher, Haematopus ostralegus – W
- Family Recurvirostridae
  - Ibisbill, Ibidorhyncha struthersii – r
  - Black-winged stilt, Himantopus himantopus – R W
  - Pied avocet, Recurvirostra avosetta – r W
- Family Charadriidae
  - Eurasian golden plover, Pluvialis apricaria – V
  - Pacific golden plover, Pluvialis fulva – W
  - Grey plover, Pluvialis squatarola – W
  - Common ringed plover, Charadrius hiaticula – W
  - Long-billed plover, Charadrius placidus – W
  - Little ringed plover, Charadrius dubius – R W
  - Kentish plover, Charadrius alexandrinus – R W
  - Lesser sand plover, Charadrius mongolus – s W
  - Greater sand plover, Charadrius leschenaultii – W
  - Caspian plover, Charadrius asiaticus – V
  - Oriental plover, Charadrius veredus – V
  - Black-fronted dotterel, Elseyornis melanops – V
  - Northern lapwing, Vanellus vanellus – W
  - Yellow-wattled lapwing, Vanellus malarbaricus – r
  - River lapwing, Vanellus duvaucelii – R
  - Grey-headed lapwing, Vanellus cinereus – W
  - Red-wattled lapwing, Vanellus indicus – R
  - Sociable lapwing, w Vanellus gregarius – V
  - White-tailed lapwing, Vanellus leucurus – W
- Family Dromadidae
  - Crab-plover, Dromas ardeola – W
- Family: Glareolidae
  - Jerdon's courser, Rhinoptilus bitorquatus – Cr
  - Cream-coloured courser, Cursorius cursor – r w
  - Indian courser, Cursorius coromandelicus – r
  - Collared pratincole, Glareola pratincola – r w
  - Oriental pratincole, Glareola maldivarum – R
  - Small pratincole, Glareola lactea – R
- Family Stercorariidae
  - Brown skua, Catharacta antarctica – s p
  - South polar skua, Catharacta maccormicki – V
  - Pomarine skua, Stercorarius pomarinus – W
  - Arctic skua, Stercorarius parasiticus – W
- Family Rynchopidae
  - Indian skimmer, Rynchops albicollis – V r
- Family: Laridae
  - White-eyed gull, Larus leucophthalmus – V
  - Sooty gull, Larus hemprichii – V
  - Common gull, Larus canus – V
  - Caspian gull, Larus cachinnans – W
  - Armenian gull, Larus armenicus
  - Heuglin's gull, Larus heuglini – W
  - Great black-headed gull, Larus ichthyaetus – W
  - Brown-headed gull, Larus brunnicephalus – s W
  - Black-headed gull, Larus ridibundus – W
  - Slender-billed gull, Larus genei – W
  - Little gull, Larus minutus – V
- Family Sternidae
  - Gull-billed tern, Gelochelidon nilotica – r W
  - Caspian tern, Hydroprogne caspia – W
  - River tern, Sterna aurantia – R
  - Lesser crested tern, Sterna bengalensis – r
  - Great crested tern, Sterna bergii – r
  - Sandwich tern, Sterna sandvicensis – W
  - Roseate tern, Sterna dougallii – r
  - Black-naped tern, Sterna sumatrana – r
  - Common tern, Sterna hirundo – s W
  - Arctic tern, Sterna paradisaea – V
  - White-cheeked tern, Sterna repressa – p
  - Black-bellied tern, Sterna acuticauda – N r
  - Little tern, Sternula albifrons – r
  - Saunders's tern, Sternula saundersi – r
  - Bridled tern, Onychoprion anaethetus – s
  - Sooty tern, Onychoprion fuscata – s
  - Whiskered tern, Chlidonias hybridus – R W
  - White-winged black tern, Chlidonias leucopterus – W
  - Black tern, Chlidonias niger – V
  - Brown noddy, Anous stolidus – V
  - Black noddy, Anous minutus – V
  - Lesser noddy, Anous tenuirostris
  - White tern, Gygis alba – r

== Falconiformes ==
- Family Pandionidae
  - Osprey, Pandion haliaetus – r W
- Family: Accipitridae
  - Jerdon's baza, Aviceda jerdoni – r
  - Black baza, Aviceda leuphotes – r
  - Oriental honey-buzzard, Pernis ptilorhyncus – R W
  - Black-shouldered kite, Elanus caeruleus – R
  - Red kite, Milvus milvus – V
  - Black kite, Milvus migrans – R W
  - Brahminy kite, Haliastur indus – R
  - White-bellied sea eagle, Haliaeetus leucogaster – R
  - Pallas's fish eagle, Haliaeetus leucoryphus – V r
  - White-tailed eagle, Haliaeetus albicilla – N W
  - Lesser fish eagle, Ichthyophaga humilis – r N
  - Grey-headed fish eagle, Ichthyophaga ichthyaetus – N r
  - Lammergeier, Gypaetus barbatus – r
  - Egyptian vulture, Neophron percnopterus – R
  - White-rumped vulture, Gyps bengalensis – C r
  - Long-billed vulture, Gyps indicus – C r
  - Slender-billed vulture, Gyps tenuirostris – r ?
  - Himalayan griffon vulture, Gyps himalayensis – r
  - Griffon vulture, Gyps fulvus – r
  - Cinereous vulture, Aegypius monachus – N r w
  - Red-headed vulture, Sarcogyps calvus – N r
  - Short-toed eagle, Circaetus gallicus – r
  - Crested serpent eagle, Spilornis cheela – R
  - Nicobar serpent eagle, Spilornis minimus – N r
  - Andaman serpent eagle, Spilornis elgini – N r
  - Marsh harrier, Circus aeruginosus – W
  - Hen harrier, Circus cyaneus – W
  - Pallid harrier, Circus macrourus – N W
  - Pied harrier, Circus melanoleucos – r w
  - Montagu's harrier, Circus pygargus – W
  - Crested goshawk, Accipiter trivirgatus – r
  - Shikra, Accipiter badius – R
  - Nicobar sparrowhawk, Accipiter butleri – N r
  - Chinese sparrowhawk, Accipiter soloensis – W
  - Japanese sparrowhawk, Accipiter gularis – W
  - Besra, Accipiter virgatus – r
  - Eurasian sparrowhawk, Accipiter nisus – r w
  - Northern goshawk, Accipiter gentilis – r w
  - White-eyed buzzard, Butastur teesa – R
  - Grey-faced buzzard, Butastur indicus – V
  - Common buzzard, Buteo buteo – r w
  - Long-legged buzzard, Buteo rufinus – r W
  - Upland buzzard, Buteo hemilasius – W
  - Rough-legged buzzard, Buteo lagopus – V
  - Black eagle, Ictinaetus malayensis – r
  - Lesser spotted eagle, Aquila pomarina – r
  - Greater spotted eagle, W Aquila clanga – V
  - Tawny eagle, Aquila rapax – R
  - Steppe eagle, Aquila nipalensis – W
  - Eastern imperial eagle, w Aquila heliaca – V
  - Golden eagle, Aquila chrysaetos – r
  - Bonelli's eagle, Hieraaetus fasciatus – r
  - Booted eagle, Hieraaetus pennatus – W
  - Rufous-bellied eagle, Hieraaetus kienerii – r
  - Changeable hawk eagle, Spizaetus cirrhatus – R
  - Mountain hawk eagle, Spizaetus nipalensis – r
- Family: Falconidae
  - Collared falconet, Microhierax caerulescens – r
  - Pied falconet, Microhierax melanoleucus – r
  - Lesser kestrel, p Falco naumanni – V
  - Common kestrel, Falco tinnunculus – R W
  - Red-necked falcon, Falco chicquera – r
  - Amur falcon, Falco amurensis – p
  - Sooty falcon, Falco concolor
  - Merlin, Falco columbarius – W
  - Eurasian hobby, Falco subbuteo – rp
  - Oriental hobby, Falco severus – r
  - Laggar falcon, Falco jugger – r
  - Saker falcon, Falco cherrug – W
  - Peregrine falcon, Falco peregrinus – r w

== Podicipediformes ==
- Family: Podicipedidae
  - Little grebe, Tachybaptus ruficollis – R
  - Red-necked grebe, Podiceps grisegena – W
  - Great crested grebe, Podiceps cristatus – r w
  - Slavonian grebe, Podiceps auritus – W
  - Black-necked grebe, Podiceps nigricollis – r w

== Pelecaniformes ==
- Family: Phaethontidae
  - Red-billed tropicbird, Phaethon aethereus – W
  - Red-tailed tropicbird, Phaethon rubricauda – r
  - White-tailed tropicbird, Phaethon lepturus – r
- Family: Sulidae
  - Masked booby, Sula dactylatra – r
  - Red-footed booby, Sula sula – r
  - Brown booby, Sula leucogaster – r
- Family: Anhingidae
  - Oriental darter, Anhinga melanogaster – R N
- Family: Phalacrocoracidae
  - Pygmy cormorant, Phalacrocorax pygmeus
  - Little cormorant, Phalacrocorax niger – R
  - Indian cormorant, Phalacrocorax fuscicollis – R
  - Great cormorant, Phalacrocorax carbo – R W
- Family: Pelecanidae
  - Great white pelican, Pelecanus onocrotalus – r W
  - Dalmatian pelican, Pelecanus crispus – D W
  - Spot-billed pelican, Pelecanus philippensis – V R
- Family: Fregatidae
  - Great frigatebird, Fregata minor – P
  - Lesser frigatebird, Fregata ariel – r
  - Christmas Island frigatebird, Fregata andrewsi – V

== Ciconiiformes ==
- Family: Ardeidae
  - Little egret, Egretta garzetta – R
  - Western reef egret, Egretta gularis – R
  - Pacific reef egret, Egretta sacra – r
  - Grey heron, Ardea cinerea – R W
  - Goliath heron, Ardea goliath – r?
  - White-bellied heron, Ardea insignis – E r
  - Great-billed heron, Ardea sumatrana – V
  - Purple heron, Ardea purpurea – R
  - Eastern great egret, Ardea modesta – R W
  - Intermediate egret, Mesophoyx intermedia – R
  - Cattle egret, Bubulcus ibis – R
  - Indian pond heron, Ardeola grayii – R
  - Chinese pond heron, Ardeola bacchus – r
  - Striated heron, Butorides striatus – r
  - Black-crowned night heron, Nycticorax nycticorax – R
  - Malayan night heron, Gorsachius melanolophus – r
  - Little bittern, Ixobrychus minutus – r
  - Yellow bittern, Ixobrychus sinensis – r
  - Cinnamon bittern, Ixobrychus cinnamomeus – r
  - Black bittern, Dupetor flavicollis – r
  - Great bittern, Botaurus stellaris – W
- Family: Phoenicopteridae
  - Greater flamingo, Phoenicopterus ruber – r W
  - Lesser flamingo, Phoenicopterus minor – N r
- Family: Threskiornithidae
  - Glossy ibis, Plegadis falcinellus – R W
  - Black-headed ibis, Threskiornis melanocephalus – N R
  - Black ibis, Pseudibis papillosa – R
  - Eurasian spoonbill, Platalea leucorodia – R W
- Family: Ciconiidae
  - Painted stork, Mycteria leucocephala – N R
  - Asian openbill, Anastomus oscitans – R
  - Black stork, Ciconia nigra – W
  - Woolly-necked stork, Ciconia episcopus – R
  - White stork, Ciconia ciconia – W
  - Oriental stork, Ciconia boyciana – V
  - Black-necked stork, Ephippiorhynchus asiaticus – N r
  - Lesser adjutant, Leptoptilos javanicus – V r
  - Greater adjutant, Leptoptilos dubius – E r

== Gaviiformes ==
- Family: Gaviidae
  - Red-throated diver, Gavia stellata – V
  - Black-throated diver, Gavia arctica – V

== Procellariiformes ==
- Family: Procellariidae
  - Cape petrel, Daption capense – V
  - Barau's petrel, Pterodroma baraui – V
  - Bulwer's petrel, Bulweria bulwerii – V
  - Jouanin's petrel, Bulweria fallax – V
  - Streaked shearwater, Calonectris leucomelas – V
  - Wedge-tailed shearwater, Puffinus pacificus – s
  - Flesh-footed shearwater, Puffinus carneipes – s
  - Sooty shearwater, Puffinus griseus – V
  - Short-tailed shearwater, Puffinus tenuirostris – V
  - Tropical shearwater, Puffinus bailloni – r
  - Persian shearwater, Puffinus persicus – N P
- Family Hydrobatidae
  - Wilson's storm-petrel, Oceanites oceanicus – P
  - White-faced storm-petrel, Pelagodroma marina – V
  - Black-bellied storm-petrel, Fregetta tropica – V
  - White-bellied storm-petrel, Fregetta grallaria – V
  - Swinhoe's storm-petrel, Oceanodroma monorhis – p
