= List of birds of South Asia: part 4 =

This list includes those birds of South Asia in the passerine families from Old World warblers to buntings.

Status abbreviations
R = widespread resident	r = very local resident	W = widespread winter visitor
w = sparse winter visitor	P = widespread migrant	p = sparse migrant
V = vagrant or irregular visitor	I = introduced resident	Ex = extinct
C = critically endangered	E = endangered	V = vulnerable
D = conservation dependent	N = near threatened	

For an introduction to the birds of the region, see List of birds of the South Asia.

For the rest of the species lists, see:

- part 1 – Megapodes, Galliformes, Gruiformes and near passerines
- part 2 – remainder of non-passerines
- part 3 – passerines from pittas to cisticolas

== Passeriformes ==
- Family: Sylviidae
  - Chestnut-headed tesia, Tesia castaneocoronata – r
  - Slaty-bellied tesia, Tesia olivea – r
  - Grey-bellied tesia, Tesia cyaniventer – r
  - Asian stubtail, Urospena squameiceps
  - Pale-footed bush warbler, Cettia pallidipes – r
  - Japanese bush warbler, Cettia diphone – V
  - Brownish-flanked bush warbler, Cettia fortipes – r
  - Chestnut-crowned bush warbler, Cettia major – r
  - Aberrant bush warbler, Cettia flavolivacea – r
  - Yellowish-bellied bush warbler, Cettia acanthizoides – r
  - Grey-sided bush warbler, Cettia brunnifrons – r
  - Cetti's warbler, Cettia cetti – W
  - Spotted bush warbler, Bradypterus thoracicus – r
  - Long-billed bush warbler, Bradypterus major – N r
  - Chinese bush warbler, Bradypterus tacsanowskius – V
  - Brown bush warbler, Bradypterus luteoventris – r
  - Russet bush warbler, Bradypterus seebohmi – V
  - Sri Lanka bush warbler, Bradypterus palliseri – N r
  - Lanceolated warbler, Locustella lanceolata – W
  - Grasshopper warbler, Locustella naevia – W
  - Pallas's grasshopper warbler, Locustella certhiola – W
  - Moustached warbler, Acrocephalus melanopogon – r w
  - Sedge warbler, Acrocephalus schoenobaenus – V
  - Black-browed reed warbler, Acrocephalus bistrigiceps – W
  - Paddyfield warbler, Acrocephalus agricola – W
  - Blunt-winged warbler, Acrocephalus concinens – r
  - Blyth's reed warbler, Acrocephalus dumetorum – W
  - Great reed warbler, Acrocephalus arundinaceus – W
  - Oriental reed warbler, Acrocephalus orientalis – W
  - Large-billed reed-warbler, Acrocephalus orinus – R ?
  - Clamorous reed warbler, Acrocephalus stentoreus – R
  - Thick-billed warbler, Acrocephalus aedon – W
  - Booted warbler, Hippolais caligata – r w
  - Sykes's warbler, Hippolais rama
  - Upcher's warbler, Hippolais languida – r
  - Mountain tailorbird, Orthotomus cuculatus – r
  - Common tailorbird, Orthotomus sutorius – R
  - Dark-necked tailorbird, Orthotomus atrogularis – r
  - White-browed tit warbler, Leptopoecile sophiae – r
  - Chiffchaff, Phylloscopus collybita – s W
  - Mountain chiffchaff, Phylloscopus sindianus – R w
  - Plain leaf warbler, Phylloscopus neglectus – W
  - Dusky warbler, Phylloscopus fuscatus – W
  - Smoky warbler, Phylloscopus fuligiventer – s w
  - Tickell's leaf warbler, Phylloscopus affinis – s W
  - Buff-throated warbler, Phylloscopus subaffinis – V
  - Sulphur-bellied warbler, Phylloscopus griseolus – s w
  - Radde's warbler, Phylloscopus schwarzi – V
  - Buff-barred warbler, Phylloscopus pulcher – r
  - Ashy-throated warbler, Phylloscopus maculipennis – r
  - Pallas's warbler, Phylloscopus chloronotus – r W
  - Chinese leaf warbler, Phylloscopus sichuanensis
  - Brooks's leaf warbler, Phylloscopus subviridis – W
  - Yellow-browed warbler, Phylloscopus inornatus – r W
  - Hume's warbler, Phylloscopus humei – W
  - Arctic warbler, Phylloscopus borealis – V
  - Greenish warbler, Phylloscopus trochiloides – r W
  - Pale-legged leaf warbler, Phylloscopus tenellipes – V
  - Large-billed leaf warbler, Phylloscopus magnirostris – r w
  - Tytler's leaf warbler, Phylloscopus tytleri – r
  - Western crowned warbler, Phylloscopus occipitalis – r
  - Eastern crowned warbler, Phylloscopus coronatus – W
  - Blyth's leaf warbler, Phylloscopus reguloides – r
  - Yellow-vented warbler, Phylloscopus cantator – r
  - Green-crowned warbler, Seicercus burkii – R
  - Grey-hooded warbler, Seicercus xanthoschistos – R
  - White-spectacled warbler, Seicercus affinis – r
  - Grey-cheeked warbler, Seicercus poliogenys – r
  - Chestnut-crowned warbler, Seicercus castaniceps – r
  - Broad-billed warbler, Tickellia hodgsoni – r
  - Rufous-faced warbler, Abroscopus albogularis – r
  - Black-faced warbler, Abroscopus schisticeps – r
  - Yellow-bellied warbler, Abroscopus superciliaris – r
  - Striated grassbird, Megalurus palustris – R
  - Bristled grassbird, Chaetornis striatus – V r
  - Rufous-rumped grassbird, Graminicola bengalensis – N r
  - Broad-tailed grassbird, Schoenicola platyura – V r
  - Garden warbler, Sylvia borin – V
  - Greater whitethroat, Sylvia communis – p
  - Lesser whitethroat, Sylvia curruca blythi – W
  - Hume's lesser whitethroat, Sylvia althaea – W
  - Small whitethroat, Sylvia minula – W
  - Menetries warbler, Sylvia mystacea – s
  - Eastern desert warbler, Sylvia nana – W
  - Barred warbler, Sylvia nisoria – V
  - Eastern Orphean warbler, Sylvia crassirostris – r W
- Family: Timaliidae
  - Abbott's babbler, Malacocincla abbotti – r
  - Buff-breasted babbler, Pellorneum tickelli – r
  - Spot-throated babbler, Pellorneum albiventre – r
  - Marsh babbler, Pellorneum palustre – V r
  - Puff-throated babbler, Pellorneum ruficeps – R
  - Brown-capped babbler, Pellorneum fuscocapillum – r
  - Large scimitar babbler, Pomatorhinus hypoleucos – r
  - Spot-breasted scimitar babbler, Pomatorhinus erythrocnemis – r
  - Rusty-cheeked scimitar babbler, Pomatorhinus erythrogenys – r
  - White-browed scimitar babbler, Pomatorhinus schisticeps – r
  - Indian scimitar babbler, Pomatorhinus horsfieldii – r
  - Streak-breasted scimitar babbler, Pomatorhinus ruficollis – r
  - Red-billed scimitar babbler, Pomatorhinus ochraciceps – r
  - Coral-billed scimitar babbler, Pomatorhinus ferruginosus – r
  - Slender-billed scimitar babbler, Xiphirhynchus superciliaris – r
  - Long-billed wren-babbler, Rimator malacoptilus – r
  - Streaked wren-babbler, Napothera brevicaudata – r
  - Eyebrowed wren-babbler, Napothera epilepidota – r
  - Scaly-breasted wren-babbler, Pnoepyga albiventer – r
  - Nepal wren-babbler, Pnoepyga immaculata – r
  - Pygmy wren-babbler, Pnoepyga pusilla – r
  - Rufous-throated wren-babbler, Spelaeornis caudatus – N r
  - Rusty-throated wren-babbler, Spelaeornis badeigularis – V r
  - Bar-winged wren-babbler, Spelaeornis troglodytoides – r
  - Spotted wren-babbler, Spelaeornis formosus – r
  - Long-tailed wren-babbler, Spelaeornis chocolatinus – r
  - Tawny-breasted wren-babbler, Spelaeornis longicaudatus – V r
  - Wedge-billed wren-babbler, Sphenocichla humei – r
  - Rufous-fronted babbler, Stachyris rufifrons – r
  - Rufous-capped babbler, Stachyris ruficeps – r
  - Black-chinned babbler, Stachyris pyrrhops – R
  - Golden babbler, Stachyris chrysaea – r
  - Grey-throated babbler, Stachyris nigriceps – r
  - Snowy-throated babbler, Stachyris oglei – V r
  - Tawny-bellied babbler, Dumetia hyperythra – R
  - Dark-fronted babbler, Rhopocichla atriceps – r
  - Striped tit babbler, Macronous gularis – R
  - Chestnut-capped babbler, Timalia pileata – R
  - Yellow-eyed babbler, Chrysomma sinense – R
  - Jerdon's babbler, Chrysomma altirostre – V r
  - Spiny babbler, Turdoides nipalensis – r
  - Common babbler, Turdoides caudatus – R
  - Striated babbler, Turdoides earlei – R
  - Slender-billed babbler, Turdoides longirostris – V r
  - Large grey babbler, Turdoides malcolmi – R
  - Rufous babbler, Turdoides subrufus – r
  - Jungle babbler, Turdoides striatus – R
  - Orange-billed babbler, Turdoides rufescens – N r
  - Yellow-billed babbler, Turdoides affinis – R
  - Chinese babax, Babax lanceolatus – V
  - Giant babax, Babax waddelli – r
  - Silver-eared mesia, Leiothrix argentauris – r
  - Red-billed leiothrix, Leiothrix lutea – r
  - Cutia, Cutia nipalensis – r
  - Black-headed shrike babbler, Pteruthius rufiventer – r
  - White-browed shrike babbler, Pteruthius flaviscapis – r
  - Green shrike babbler, Pteruthius xanthochlorus – r
  - Black-eared shrike babbler, Pteruthius melanotis – r
  - Chestnut-fronted shrike babbler, Pteruthius aenobarbus – r
  - White-hooded babbler, Gampsorhynchus rufulus – r
  - Rusty-fronted barwing, Actinodura egertoni – r
  - Hoary-throated barwing, Actinodura nipalensis – r
  - Streak-throated barwing, Actinodura waldeni – r
  - Blue-winged minla, Minla cyanouroptera – r
  - Chestnut-tailed minla, Minla strigula – r
  - Red-tailed minla, Minla ignotincta – r
  - Golden-breasted fulvetta, Alcippe chrysotis – r
  - Yellow-throated fulvetta, Alcippe cinerea – r
  - Rufous-winged fulvetta, Alcippe castaneceps – r
  - White-browed fulvetta, Alcippe vinipectus – r
  - Streak-throated fulvetta, Alcippe cinereiceps – r
  - Ludlow's fulvetta, Alcippe ludlowi – r
  - Rufous-throated fulvetta, Alcippe rufogularis – r
  - Rusty-capped fulvetta, Alcippe dubia – r
  - Brown-cheeked fulvetta, Alcippe poioicephala – R
  - Nepal fulvetta, Alcippe nipalensis – r
  - Rufous-backed sibia, Heterophasia annectans – r
  - Rufous sibia, Heterophasia capistrata – R
  - Grey sibia, Heterophasia gracilis – r
  - Beautiful sibia, Heterophasia pulchella – r
  - Long-tailed sibia, Heterophasia picaoides – r
  - Striated yuhina, Yuhina castaniceps – r
  - White-naped yuhina, Yuhina bakeri – r
  - Whiskered yuhina, Yuhina flavicollis – R
  - Stripe-throated yuhina, Yuhina gularis – R
  - Rufous-vented yuhina, Yuhina occipitalis – r
  - Black-chinned yuhina, Yuhina nigrimenta – R
  - White-bellied yuhina, Yuhina zantholeuca – r
  - Fire-tailed myzornis, Myzornis pyrrhoura – r
  - Bearded parrotbill, Panurus biarmicus
  - Great parrotbill, Conostoma oemodium – r
  - Brown parrotbill, Paradoxornis unicolor – r
  - Grey-headed parrotbill, Paradoxornis gularis – r
  - Black-breasted parrotbill, Paradoxornis flavirostris – V r
  - Spot-breasted parrotbill, Paradoxornis guttaticollis – r
  - Fulvous parrotbill, Paradoxornis fulvifrons – r
  - Black-throated parrotbill, Paradoxornis nipalensis – r
  - Lesser rufous-headed parrotbill, Paradoxornis atrosuperciliaris – r
  - Greater rufous-headed parrotbill, Paradoxornis ruficeps – r
- Family: Alaudidae
  - Singing bushlark, Mirafra cantillans – r
  - Indian bushlark, Mirafra erythroptera – R
  - Bengal bushlark, Mirafra assamica – R
  - Rufous-winged bushlark, Mirafra affinis – R
  - Black-crowned sparrow lark, Eremopterix nigriceps – r
  - Ashy-crowned sparrow lark, Eremopterix grisea – R
  - Bar-tailed lark, Ammomanes cincturus – r
  - Rufous-tailed lark, Ammomanes phoenicurus – R
  - Desert lark, Ammomanes deserti – r
  - Greater hoopoe lark, Alaemon alaudipes – r
  - Bimaculated lark, Melanocorypha bimaculata – W
  - Tibetan lark, Melanocorypha maxima – r
  - Short-toed lark, Calandrella brachydactyla – W
  - Hume's lark, Calandrella acutirostris – r w
  - Lesser short-toed lark, Calandrella rufescens – W
  - Asian short-toed lark, Calandrella cheleensis – V
  - Sand lark, Calandrella raytal – R
  - Crested lark, Galerida cristata – R
  - Malabar crested lark, Galerida malabarica – r
  - Sykes's lark, Galerida deva – r
  - Eurasian skylark, Alauda arvensis – W
  - Oriental skylark, Alauda gulgula – R
  - Horned lark, Eremophila alpestris – r
- Family: Nectariniidae
  - Thick-billed flowerpecker, Dicaeum agile – R
  - Yellow-vented flowerpecker, Dicaeum chrysorrheum – r
  - Yellow-bellied flowerpecker, Dicaeum melanoxanthum – r
  - Legge's flowerpecker, Dicaeum vincens – N r
  - Orange-bellied flowerpecker, Dicaeum trigonostigma – r
  - Pale-billed flowerpecker, Dicaeum erythrorynchos – R
  - Plain flowerpecker, Dicaeum concolor – r
  - Fire-breasted flowerpecker, Dicaeum ignipectus – r
  - Scarlet-backed flowerpecker, Dicaeum cruentatum – r
  - Ruby-cheeked sunbird, Anthreptes singalensis – r
  - Purple-rumped sunbird, Nectarinia zeylonica – R
  - Crimson-backed sunbird, Nectarinia minima – r
  - Purple-throated sunbird, Nectarinia sperata – r
  - Olive-backed sunbird, Nectarinia jugularis – r
  - Purple sunbird, Nectarinia asiatica – R
  - Loten's sunbird, Nectarinia lotenia – R
  - Gould's sunbird, Aethopyga gouldiae – r
  - Green-tailed sunbird, Aethopyga nipalensis – r
  - Black-throated sunbird, Aethopyga saturata – r
  - Crimson sunbird, Aethopyga siparaja – R
  - Fire-tailed sunbird, Aethopyga ignicauda – r
  - Little spiderhunter, Arachnothera longirostra – r
  - Streaked spiderhunter, Arachnothera magna – r
- Family: Passeridae
  - House sparrow, Passer domesticus – R
  - Spanish sparrow, Passer hispaniolensis – W
  - Sind sparrow, Passer pyrrhonotus – r
  - Russet sparrow, Passer rutilans – R
  - Dead Sea sparrow, Passer moabiticus – V
  - Eurasian tree sparrow, Passer montanus – R
  - Chestnut-shouldered petronia, Petronia xanthocollis – R
  - Rock sparrow, Petronia petronia – W
  - Tibetan snowfinch, Montifringilla adamsi – r
  - White-rumped snowfinch, Pyrgilauda taczanowskii – r
  - Rufous-necked snowfinch, Pyrgilauda ruficollis – W
  - Plain-backed snowfinch, Pyrgilauda blanfordi – W
- Family: Motacillidae
  - Forest wagtail, Dendronanthus indicus – r W
  - White wagtail, Motacilla alba – r W
  - White-browed wagtail, Motacilla maderaspatensis – R
  - Citrine wagtail, Motacilla citreola citreola – r W
  - Yellow wagtail, Motacilla flava – W
  - Grey wagtail, Motacilla cinerea – r W
  - Richard's pipit, Anthus richardi – W
  - Paddyfield pipit, Anthus rufulus – R
  - Tawny pipit, Anthus campestris – W
  - Blyth's pipit, Anthus godlewskii – W
  - Long-billed pipit, Anthus similis – R w
  - Tree pipit, Anthus trivialis – r W
  - Olive-backed pipit, Anthus hodgsoni – R W
  - Meadow pipit, Anthus pratensis – V
  - Red-throated pipit, Anthus cervinus – p
  - Rosy pipit, Anthus roseatus – r
  - Water pipit, Anthus spinoletta – W
  - Buff-bellied pipit, Anthus rubescens – W
  - Upland pipit, Anthus sylvanus – r
  - Nilgiri pipit, Anthus nilghiriensis – N r
- Family: Prunellidae
  - Alpine accentor, Prunella collaris – r
  - Altai accentor, Prunella himalayana – W
  - Robin accentor, Prunella rubeculoides – R
  - Rufous-breasted accentor, Prunella strophiata – r
  - Radde's accentor, Prunella ocularis – V
  - Brown accentor, Prunella fulvescens – r
  - Black-throated accentor, Prunella atrogularis – W
  - Maroon-backed accentor, Prunella immaculata – r
  - Family: Ploceidae
  - Black-breasted weaver, Ploceus benghalensis – R
  - Streaked weaver, Ploceus manyar – R
  - Baya weaver, Ploceus philippinus – R
  - Finn's weaver, Ploceus megarhynchus – V r
- Family: Estrildidae
  - Red avadavat, Amandava amandava – R
  - Green avadavat, Amandava formosa – V r
  - Indian silverbill, Lonchura malabarica – R
  - White-rumped munia, Lonchura striata – R
  - Black-throated munia, Lonchura kelaarti – r
  - Scaly-breasted munia, Lonchura punctulata – R
  - Black-headed munia, Lonchura malacca – R
  - Java sparrow, Lonchura oryzivora – I r
- Family: Fringillidae
  - Common chaffinch, Fringilla coelebs – V
  - Brambling, Fringilla montifringilla – V
  - Fire-fronted serin, Serinus pusillus – R
  - Yellow-breasted greenfinch, Carduelis spinoides – R
  - Black-headed greenfinch, Carduelis ambigua – r
  - Eurasian siskin, Carduelis spinus – V
  - Tibetan serin, Carduelis thibetana – r
  - European goldfinch, Carduelis carduelis – r
  - Twite, Carduelis flavirostris – r
  - Eurasian linnet, Carduelis cannabina – W
  - Plain mountain finch, Leucosticte nemoricola – r
  - Black-headed mountain finch, Leucosticte brandti – r
  - Red-browed finch, Callacanthis burtoni –
  - Crimson-winged finch, Rhodopechys sanguinea – r
  - Trumpeter finch, Bucanetes githagineus – W
  - Mongolian finch, Bucanetes mongolicus – W
  - Desert finch, Rhodospiza absoleta – V
  - Blanford's rosefinch, Carpodacus rubescens – r
  - Dark-breasted rosefinch, Carpodacus nipalensis – r
  - Common rosefinch, Carpodacus erythrinus – r w
  - Beautiful rosefinch, Carpodacus pulcherrimus – r
  - Pink-browed rosefinch, Carpodacus rodochrous – r
  - Vinaceous rosefinch, Carpodacus vinaceus – r
  - Dark-rumped rosefinch, Carpodacus edwardsii – r
  - Three-banded rosefinch, Carpodacus trifasciatus – V
  - Spot-winged rosefinch, Carpodacus rodopeplus – r
  - White-browed rosefinch, Carpodacus thura – r
  - Red-mantled rosefinch, Carpodacus rhodochlamys – r
  - Streaked rosefinch, Carpodacus rubicilloides – r
  - Great rosefinch, Carpodacus rubicilla – r
  - Red-fronted rosefinch, Carpodacus puniceus – r
  - Crimson-browed finch, Propyrrhula subhimachala – r
  - Scarlet finch, Haematospiza sipahi – r
  - Red crossbill, Loxia curvirostra – r
  - Brown bullfinch, Pyrrhula nipalensis – r
  - Orange bullfinch, Pyrrhula aurantiaca – r
  - Red-headed bullfinch, Pyrrhula erythrocephala – r
  - Grey-headed bullfinch, Pyrrhula erythaca – r
  - Hawfinch, Coccothraustes coccothraustes – W
  - Japanese grosbeak, Eophona personata – V
  - Black-and-yellow grosbeak, Mycerobas icterioides – r
  - Collared grosbeak, Mycerobas affinis – r
  - Spot-winged grosbeak, Mycerobas melanozanthos – r
  - White-winged grosbeak, Mycerobas carnipes – r
  - Gold-naped finch, Pyrrhoplectes epauletta – r
- Family: Emberizidae
  - Crested bunting, Melophus lathami – R
  - Yellowhammer, Emberiza citrinella – W
  - Pine bunting, Emberiza leucocephalos – W
  - Rock bunting, Emberiza cia – R
  - Godlewski's bunting, Emberiza godlewskii – r
  - Grey-necked bunting, Emberiza buchanani – W
  - Ortolan bunting, Emberiza hortulana – V
  - Chestnut-breasted bunting, Emberiza stewarti – r w
  - Striolated bunting, Emberiza striolata – r
  - Chestnut-eared bunting, Emberiza fucata – r w
  - Little bunting, Emberiza pusilla – W
  - Rustic bunting, Emberiza rustica –
  - Yellow-breasted bunting, Emberiza aureola – W
  - Chestnut bunting, Emberiza rutila – W
  - Black-headed bunting, Emberiza melanocephala – W
  - Red-headed bunting, Emberiza bruniceps – W
  - Black-faced bunting, Emberiza spodocephala – W
  - Pallas's reed bunting, Emberiza pallasi – V
  - Reed bunting, Emberiza schoeniclus – r w
  - Corn bunting, Miliaria calandra – V
