= List of birds of South Asia =

The birds of South Asia include the species found in India, Pakistan, Nepal, Bangladesh, Bhutan, Sri Lanka and the Maldives.

This is not only a huge geographical area, but has a range of habitats extending from deserts to rainforest, and from the world's highest mountains to coastal mangrove swamps.

These factors, coupled with the tropical climate, result in a large numbers of bird species, some 1300. As would be expected in the tropics, most of these, more than 1,000 species, are resident within the South Asia. The rest are mainly winter visitors from further north in Eurasia. Only eighteen species are purely summer visitors to the subcontinent.

141 species are endemic to the region, and 26 of these are endemic to Sri Lanka.

Status abbreviations
R = widespread resident	r = very local resident	W = widespread winter visitor
w = sparse winter visitor	P = widespread migrant	p = sparse migrant
V = vagrant or irregular visitor	I = introduced resident	Ex = extinct
C = critically endangered	E = endangered	V = vulnerable
D = conservation dependent	N = near threatened	

Because of the large number of species, the lists are divided into four parts.

- part 1 – Megapodes, Galliformes, Gruiformes and near passerines
- part 2 – remainder of non-passerines
- part 3 – passerines from pittas to cisticolas
- part 4 – passerines from Old World warblers to buntings

== See also ==
- List of birds of Pakistan
- List of birds of India
  - List of endemic birds of the Andaman and Nicobar Islands
- List of birds of Sri Lanka
- List of birds of the Maldives
