= List of birds of South Asia: part 1 =

This item lists those birds of South Asia in the Megapodes, Galliformes, Gruiformes and near passerines.

Status abbreviations
R = widespread resident	r = very local resident	W = widespread winter visitor
w = sparse winter visitor	P = widespread migrant	p = sparse migrant
V = vagrant or irregular visitor	I = introduced resident	Ex = extinct
C = critically endangered	E = endangered	V = vulnerable
D = conservation dependent	N = near threatened	

For an introduction to the birds of the region, see List of birds of the South Asia.

For the rest of the species lists, see:

- part 2 – remainder of non-passerines
- part 3 – passerines from pittas to cisticolas
- part 4 – passerines from Old World warblers to buntings

== Craciformes ==
- Family: Megapodiidae
  - Nicobar scrubfowl, Megapodius nicobariensis – V r

== Galliformes ==
- Family: Phasianidae
  - Snow partridge, Lerwa lerwa – r
  - See-see partridge, Ammoperdix griseogularis
  - Tibetan snowcock, Tetraogallus tibetanus – r
  - Himalayan snowcock, Tetraogallus himalayensis – r
  - Buff-throated partridge, Tetraophasis szechenyii – r
  - Chukar, Alectoris chukar – R
  - Black francolin, Francolinus francolinus – R
  - Painted francolin, Francolinus pictus – R
  - Chinese francolin, Francolinus pintadeanus – r
  - Grey francolin, Francolinus pondicerianus – R
  - Swamp francolin, Francolinus gularis – V r
  - Tibetan partridge, Perdix hodgsoniae – r
  - Common quail, Coturnix coturnix – r w
  - Japanese quail, Coturnix japonica – w
  - Rain quail, Coturnix coromandelica – r
  - Blue-breasted quail, Coturnix chinensis – r
  - Jungle bush quail, Perdicula asiatica – R
  - Rock bush quail, Perdicula argoondah – R
  - Painted bush quail, Perdicula erythrorhyncha – r
  - Manipur bush quail, Perdicula manipurensis – V r
  - Hill partridge, Arborophila torqueola – r
  - Rufous-throated partridge, Arborophila rufogularis – r
  - White-cheeked partridge, Arborophila atrogularis – N r
  - Chestnut-breasted partridge, Arborophila mandellii – V r
  - Mountain bamboo partridge, Bambusicola fytchii – r
  - Red spurfowl, Galloperdix spadicea – r
  - Painted spurfowl, Galloperdix lunulata – r
  - Sri Lanka spurfowl, Galloperdix bicalcarata – r
  - Himalayan quail, Ophrysia superciliosa – C Ex
  - Blood pheasant, Ithaginis cruentus – r
  - Western tragopan, Tragopan melanocephalus – V r
  - Satyr tragopan, Tragopan satyra – N r
  - Blyth's tragopan, Tragopan blythii – V r
  - Temminck's tragopan, Tragopan temminckii – r
  - Koklass pheasant, Pucrasia macrolopha – r
  - Himalayan monal, Lophophorus impejanus – r
  - Sclater's monal, Lophophorus sclateri – V r
  - Red junglefowl, Gallus gallus – R
  - Grey junglefowl, Gallus sonneratii – R
  - Sri Lanka junglefowl, Gallus lafayetii – R
  - Kalij pheasant, Lophura leucomelanos – R
  - Tibetan eared pheasant, Crossoptilon harmani – N V
  - Cheer pheasant, Catreus wallichii – V r
  - Mrs Hume's pheasant, Syrmaticus humiae – V r
  - Grey peacock pheasant, Polyplectron bicalcaratum – r
  - Indian peafowl, Pavo cristatus – R
  - Green peafowl, Pavo muticus – r

== Anseriformes ==
- Family: Anatidae
  - Fulvous whistling-duck, Dendrocygna bicolor – r
  - Lesser whistling-duck, Dendrocygna javanica – R
  - White-headed duck, Oxyura leucocephala – E V
  - Mute swan, Cygnus olor – V
  - Whooper swan, Cygnus cygnus – V
  - Tundra swan, Cygnus columbianus – V
  - Bean goose, Anser fabalis – V
  - White-fronted goose, Anser albifrons – V
  - Lesser white-fronted goose, Anser erythropus – V
  - Greylag goose, Anser anser – W
  - Bar-headed goose, Anser indicus – r W
  - Snow goose, Anser caerulescens – V
  - Red-breasted goose, Branta ruficollis – V
  - Ruddy shelduck, Tadorna ferruginea – R W
  - Common shelduck, Tadorna tadorna – w
  - White-winged duck, Cairina scutulata – E r
  - Comb duck, Sarkidiornis melanotos – r
  - Cotton pygmy goose, Nettapus coromandelianus – r
  - Mandarin duck, Aix galericulata – V
  - Gadwall, Anas strepera – W
  - Falcated duck, Anas falcata – V
  - Eurasian wigeon, Anas penelope – W
  - Mallard, Anas platyrhynchos – r W
  - Spot-billed duck, Anas poecilorhyncha – R
  - Northern shoveler, Anas clypeata – W
  - Sunda teal, Anas gibberifrons – r
  - Northern pintail, Anas acuta – W
  - Garganey, Anas querquedula – W
  - Baikal teal, Anas formosa – V V
  - Common teal, Anas crecca – W
  - Marbled duck, Marmaronetta angustirostris – V V
  - Pink-headed duck, Rhodonessa caryophyllacea – C Ex
  - Red-crested pochard, Rhodonessa rufina – w
  - Common pochard, Aythya ferina – W
  - Ferruginous duck, Aythya nyroca – N w
  - Baer's pochard, Aythya baeri – V w
  - Tufted duck, Aythya fuligula – W
  - Greater scaup, Aythya marila – V
  - Long-tailed duck, Clangula hyemalis – V
  - White-winged scoter, Meanitta fusca – V
  - Common goldeneye, Bucephala clangula – V
  - Smew, Mergellus albellus – W
  - Red-breasted merganser, Mergus serrator – V
  - Common merganser, Mergus merganser – R W

== Turniciformes ==
- Family: Turnicidae
  - Small buttonquail, Turnix sylvatica – R
  - Yellow-legged buttonquail, Turnix tanki – R
  - Barred buttonquail, Turnix suscitator – R

== Piciformes ==
- Family: Indicatoridae
  - Yellow-rumped honeyguide, Indicator xanthonotus – N r
- Family: Picidae
  - Eurasian wryneck, Jynx torquilla – W
  - White-browed piculet, Sasia ochracea – r
  - Brown-capped pygmy woodpecker, Dendrocopos nanus – R
  - Grey-capped pygmy woodpecker, Dendrocopos canicapillus – R
  - Brown-fronted woodpecker, Dendrocopos auriceps – R
  - Fulvous-breasted woodpecker, Dendrocopos macei – R
  - Stripe-breasted woodpecker, Dendrocopos atratus – r
  - Yellow-crowned woodpecker, Dendrocopos mahrattensis – R
  - Rufous-bellied woodpecker, Dendrocopos hyperythrus – r
  - Crimson-breasted woodpecker, Dendrocopos cathpharius – r
  - Darjeeling woodpecker, Dendrocopos darjellensis – R
  - Great spotted woodpecker, Dendrocopos major – R
  - Sind woodpecker, Dendrocopos assimilis – r
  - Himalayan woodpecker, Dendrocopos himalayensis – R
  - Rufous woodpecker, Celeus brachyurus – R
  - White-bellied woodpecker, Dryocopus javensis – r
  - Andaman woodpecker, Dryocopus hodgei – N r
  - Lesser yellownape, Picus chlorolophus – R
  - Greater yellownape, Picus flavinucha – R
  - Laced woodpecker, Picus vittatus – r
  - Streak-throated woodpecker, Picus xanthopygaeus – R
  - Scaly-bellied woodpecker, Picus squamatus – R
  - Grey-headed woodpecker, Picus canus – R
  - Himalayan flameback, Dinopium shorii – R
  - Common flameback, Dinopium javanense – R
  - Black-rumped flameback, Dinopium benghalense – R
  - Greater flameback, Chrysocolaptes lucidus – R
  - White-naped woodpecker, Chrysocolaptes festivus – r
  - Pale-headed woodpecker, Gecinulus grantia – r
  - Bay woodpecker, Blythipicus pyrrhotis – r
  - Heart-spotted woodpecker, Hemicircus canente – r
  - Great slaty woodpecker, Mulleripicus pulverulentus – r
- Family: Megalaimidae
  - Great barbet, Megalaima virens – R
  - Brown-headed barbet, Megalaima zeylanica – R
  - Lineated barbet, Megalaima lineata – R
  - White-cheeked barbet, Megalaima viridis – R
  - Yellow-fronted barbet, Megalima flavifrons – r
  - Golden-throated barbet, Megalaima franklinii – r
  - Blue-throated barbet, Megalaima asiatica – R
  - Blue-eared barbet, Megalaima australis – r
  - Crimson-fronted barbet, Megalaima rubricapilla – r
  - Coppersmith barbet, Megalaima haemacephala – R

== Bucerotiformes ==
- Family: Bucerotidae
  - Indian grey hornbill, Ocyceros birostris – R
  - Malabar grey hornbill, Ocyceros griseus – R
  - Sri Lanka grey hornbill, Ocyceros gingalensis – R
  - Great hornbill, Buceros bicornis – N R
  - Brown hornbill, Anorrhinus tickelli – N r
  - Rufous-necked hornbill, Aceros nipalensis – V r
  - Wreathed hornbill, Aceros undulatus – r
  - Narcondam hornbill, Aceros narcondami – V r
  - Oriental pied hornbill, Anthracoceros albirostris – r
  - Malabar pied hornbill, Anthracoceros coronatus – N r

== Upupiformes ==
- Family: Upupidae
  - Eurasian hoopoe, Upupa epops – R W

== Trogoniformes ==
- Family: Trogonidae
  - Malabar trogon, Harpactes fasciatus – r
  - Red-headed trogon, Harpactes erythrocephalus – r
  - Ward's trogon, Harpactes wardi – N r

== Coraciiformes ==
- Family: Coraciidae
  - European roller, Coracias garrulus – r p
  - Indian roller, Coracias benghalensis – R
  - Dollarbird, Eurystomus orientalis – r
- Family: Alcedinidae
  - Subfamily: Alcedininae
    - Blyth's kingfisher, Alcedo hercules – N r
    - Common kingfisher, Alcedo atthis – R
    - Blue-eared kingfisher, Alcedo meninting – r
    - Oriental dwarf kingfisher, Ceyx erithacus – r
  - Subfamily: Halcyoninae
    - Brown-winged kingfisher, Pelargopsis amauroptera – N r
    - Stork-billed kingfisher, Pelargopsis capensis – R
    - Ruddy kingfisher, Halcyon coromanda – r
    - White-throated kingfisher, Halcyon smyrnensis – R
    - Black-capped kingfisher, Halcyon pileata – R
    - Collared kingfisher, Todiramphus chloris – r
  - Subfamily: Cerylinae
    - Crested kingfisher, Megaceryle lugubris – R
    - Pied kingfisher, Ceryle rudis – R
- Family: Meropidae
  - Blue-bearded bee-eater, Nyctyornis athertoni – r
  - Green bee-eater, Merops orientalis – R
  - Blue-cheeked bee-eater, Merops persicus – PS
  - Blue-tailed bee-eater, Merops philippinus – R
  - European bee-eater, Merops apiaster – s P
  - Chestnut-headed bee-eater, Merops leschenaulti – R

== Cuculiformes ==
- Family: Cuculidae
  - Pied cuckoo, Clamator jacobinus – r S
  - Chestnut-winged cuckoo, Clamator coromandus – r
  - Large hawk cuckoo, Hierococcyx sparverioides – r
  - Common hawk cuckoo, Hierococcyx varius – R
  - Hodgson's hawk cuckoo, Hierococcyx fugax – r
  - Indian cuckoo, Cuculus micropterus – R
  - Common cuckoo, Cuculus canorus – R
  - Oriental cuckoo, Cuculus saturatus – r
  - Lesser cuckoo, Cuculus poliocephalus – r
  - Banded bay cuckoo, Cacomantis sonneratii – r
  - Grey-bellied cuckoo, Cacomantis passerinus – r
  - Plaintive cuckoo, Cacomantis merulinus – r
  - Asian emerald cuckoo, Chrysococcyx maculatus – r
  - Violet cuckoo, Chrysococcyx xanthorhynchus – r
  - Drongo cuckoo, Surniculus lugubris – r
  - Asian koel, Eudynamys scolopacea – R
  - Green-billed malkoha, Phaenicophaeus tristis – r
  - Blue-faced malkoha, Phaenicophaeus viridirostris – r
  - Sirkeer malkoha, Phaenicophaeus leschenaultii – r
  - Red-faced malkoha, Phaenicophaeus pyrrhocephalus – V r
- Family: Centropodidae
  - Greater coucal, Centropus sinensis – R
  - Brown coucal, Centropus andamanensis – r
  - Lesser coucal, Centropus bengalensis – r
  - Green-billed coucal, Centropus chlororhynchus – V r

== Psittaciformes ==
- Family: Psittacidae
  - Vernal hanging parrot, Loriculus vernalis – R
  - Sri Lanka hanging parrot, Loriculus beryllinus – R
  - Alexandrine parakeet, Psittacula eupatria – R
  - Rose-ringed parakeet, Psittacula krameri – R
  - Slaty-headed parakeet, Psittacula himalayana – R
  - Grey-headed parakeet, Psittacula finschii – R
  - Intermediate parakeet, Psittacula intermedia – r ?
  - Plum-headed parakeet, Psittacula cyanocephala – R
  - Blossom-headed parakeet, Psittacula roseata – R
  - Malabar parakeet, Psittacula columboides – R
  - Layard's parakeet, Psittacula calthropae – r
  - Derbyan parakeet, Psittacula derbiana – r
  - Red-breasted parakeet, Psittacula alexandri – R
  - Nicobar parakeet, Psittacula caniceps – r
  - Long-tailed parakeet, Psittacula longicauda – N R

== Apodiformes ==
- Family: Apodidae
  - Glossy swiftlet, Collocalia esculenta – R
  - Indian swiftlet, Collocalia unicolor – R
  - Himalayan swiftlet, Collocalia brevirostris – R
  - Black-nest swiftlet, Collocalia maxima
  - Edible-nest swiftlet, Collocalia fuciphaga – R
  - White-rumped needletail, Zoonavena sylvatica – R
  - White-throated needletail, Hirundapus caudacutus
  - Silver-backed needletail, Hirundapus cochinchinensis – r
  - Brown-backed needletail, Hirundapus giganteus – R
  - Asian palm swift, Cypsiurus balasiensis – R
  - Alpine swift, Tachymarptis melba – r
  - Common swift, Apus apus – W
  - Pallid swift, Apus pallidus – r
  - Pacific swift, Apus pacificus – r
  - Dark-rumped swift, Apus acuticauda – V r
  - House swift, Apus affinis – R
- Family: Hemiprocnidae
  - Crested treeswift, Hemiprocne coronata – R

== Strigiformes ==
- Family: Tytonidae
  - Eastern barn owl, Tyto javanica – r
  - Eastern grass owl, Tyto longimembris - r
  - Andaman masked owl, Tyto deroepstorffi
  - Oriental bay owl, Phodilus badius – r
  - Sri Lanka bay owl, Phodilus assimilis - r
- Family: Strigidae
  - Andaman scops owl, Otus balli – r
  - Mountain scops owl, Otus spilocephalus – r
  - Pallid scops owl, Otus brucei – r
  - Eurasian scops owl, Otus scops – W
  - Moluccan scops owl, Otus magicus – V
  - Indian scops owl, Otus lettia – R
  - Oriental scops owl, Otus sunia – R
  - Collared scops owl, Otus bakkamoena – R
  - Eurasian eagle owl, Bubo bubo – R
  - Rock eagle owl, Bubo bengalensis – R
  - Spot-bellied eagle owl, Bubo nipalensis – r
  - Dusky eagle owl, Bubo coromandus – R
  - Brown fish owl, Ketupa zeylonensis – r
  - Tawny fish owl, Ketupa flavipes – r
  - Buffy fish owl, Ketupa ketupu – r
  - Snowy owl, Nyctia scandiaca – V
  - Mottled wood owl, Strix ocellata – r
  - Brown wood owl, Strix leptogrammica – r
  - Tawny owl, Strix aluco – r
  - Hume's owl, Strix butleri
  - Collared owlet, Glaucidium brodiei – r
  - Asian barred owlet, Glaucidium cuculoides – r
  - Jungle owlet, Glaucidium radiatum – R
  - Chestnut-backed owlet, Glaucidium castanonotum – N r
  - Little owl, Athene noctua – r
  - Spotted owlet, Athene brama – R
  - Forest owlet, Heteroglaux blewitti – r
  - Tengmalm's owl, Aegolius funereus – V
  - Brown hawk owl, Ninox scutulata – r
  - Andaman hawk owl, Ninox affinis – N r
  - Long-eared owl, Asio otus – r w
  - Short-eared owl, Asio flammeus – W
- Family: Batrachostomidae
  - Sri Lanka frogmouth, Batrachostomus moniliger – r
  - Hodgson's frogmouth, Batrachostomus hodgsoni – r
- Family: Eurostopodidae
  - Great eared nightjar, Eurostopodus macrotis – r
- Family: Caprimulgidae
  - Grey nightjar, Caprimulgus indicus – R
  - Eurasian nightjar, Caprimulgus europaeus – r p
  - Egyptian nightjar, Caprimulgus aegyptius – V
  - Sykes's nightjar, Caprimulgus mahrattensis – r
  - Large-tailed nightjar, Caprimulgus macrurus – R
  - Jerdon's nightjar, Caprimulgus atripennis – R
  - Indian nightjar, Caprimulgus asiaticus – R
  - Savanna nightjar, Caprimulgus affinis – r

== Columbiformes ==
- Family: Columbidae
  - Rock pigeon, Columba livia – R
  - Hill pigeon, Columba rupestris – R
  - Snow pigeon, Columba leuconota – R
  - Yellow-eyed pigeon, Columba eversmanni – V w
  - Common wood pigeon, Columba palumbus – W
  - Speckled wood pigeon, Columba hodgsonii – r
  - Ashy wood pigeon, Columba pulchricollis – r
  - Nilgiri woodpigeon, Columba elphinstonii – V r
  - Sri Lanka wood pigeon, Columba torringtoni – r V
  - Pale-capped pigeon, w Columba punicea – V
  - Andaman wood pigeon, Columba palumboides – N r
  - European turtle dove, Streptopelia turtur – V
  - Oriental turtle dove, Streptopelia orientalis – R W
  - Laughing dove, Streptopelia senegalensis – R
  - Spotted dove, Streptopelia chinensis – R
  - Red collared dove, Streptopelia tranquebarica – R
  - Eurasian collared dove, Streptopelia decaocto – R
  - Barred cuckoo dove, Macropygia unchall – r
  - Andaman cuckoo dove, Macropygia rufipennis – N r
  - Emerald dove, Chalcophaps indica – R
  - Nicobar pigeon, Caloenas nicobarica – r
  - Orange-breasted green pigeon, Treron bicincta – r
  - Pompadour green pigeon, Treron pompadora – r
  - Thick-billed green pigeon, Treron curvirostra – r
  - Yellow-footed green pigeon, Treron phoenicoptera – R
  - Pin-tailed green pigeon, Treron apicauda – r
  - Wedge-tailed green pigeon, Treron sphenura – r
  - Green imperial pigeon, Ducula aenea – r
  - Mountain imperial pigeon, Ducula badia – r
  - Pied imperial pigeon, Ducula bicolor – r

== Gruiformes ==
- Family: Otididae
  - Little bustard, Tetrax tetrax – N V
  - Great bustard, Otis tarda – V
  - Indian bustard, Ardeotis nigriceps – E r
  - MacQueen's bustard, Chlamydotis macqueeni – N W
  - Houbara bustard, Chlamydotis undulata
  - Bengal florican, Houbaropsis bengalensis – E r
  - Lesser florican, Sypheotides indica – E r
- Family: Gruidae
  - Siberian crane, Grus leucogeranus – C W
  - Sarus crane, Grus antigone – V r
  - Demoiselle crane, Grus virgo – W
  - Common crane, Grus grus – W
  - Hooded crane, Grus monacha – V
  - Black-necked crane, Grus nigricollis – V r
- Family: Heliornithidae
  - Masked finfoot, Heliopais personata – V r
- Family: Rallidae
  - Andaman crake, Rallina canningi – r
  - Red-legged crake, Rallina fasciata – V ?
  - Slaty-legged crake, Rallina eurizonoides – r
  - Slaty-breasted rail, Gallirallus striatus – r
  - Water rail, Rallus aquaticus – r w
  - Corn crake, Crex crex – V
  - Brown crake, Amaurornis akool – r
  - White-breasted waterhen, Amaurornis phoenicurus – R
  - Black-tailed crake, Porzana bicolor – r
  - Little crake, Porzana parva – V
  - Baillon's crake, Porzana pusilla – r w
  - Spotted crake, Porzana porzana – V
  - Ruddy-breasted crake, Porzana fusca – r
  - Watercock, Gallicrex cinerea – r
  - Purple swamphen, Porphyrio porphyrio – R
  - Common moorhen, Gallinula chloropus – R
  - Common coot, Fulica atra – R W
