= List of birds of South Asia: part 3 =

This list includes those birds of South Asia in the passerine families from pittas to cisticolas.

Status abbreviations
| R = widespread resident | r = very local resident | W = widespread winter visitor |
| w = sparse winter visitor | P = widespread migrant | p = sparse migrant |
| V = vagrant or irregular visitor | I = introduced resident | Ex = extinct |
| C = critically endangered | E = endangered | V = vulnerable |
| D = conservation dependent | N = near threatened | |

For an introduction to the birds of the region, see List of birds of the South Asia.

For the rest of the species lists, see:

- part 1 – Megapodes, Galliformes, Gruiformes and near passerines
- part 2 – remainder of non-passerines
- part 4 – passerines from Old World warblers to buntings

== Passeriformes ==
- Family: Pittidae
  - Eared pitta, Pitta phayrei – V
  - Blue-naped pitta, Pitta nipalensis – r
  - Blue pitta, Pitta cyanea – r
  - Hooded pitta, Pitta sordida – r
  - Indian pitta, Pitta brachyura – R
  - Mangrove pitta, Pitta megarhyncha – N r
- Family: Eurylaimidae
  - Silver-breasted broadbill, Serilophus lunatus – r
  - Long-tailed broadbill, Psarisomus dalhousiae – r
- Family: Irenidae
  - Asian fairy bluebird, Irena puella – r
  - Blue-winged leafbird, Chloropsis cochinchinensis – R
  - Golden-fronted leafbird, Chloropsis aurifrons – R
  - Orange-bellied leafbird, Chloropsis hardwickii – r
- Family: Laniidae
  - Red-backed shrike, Lanius collurio – p
  - Isabelline shrike, Lanius isabellinus – W
  - Brown shrike, Lanius cristatus – W
  - Burmese shrike, Lanius collurioides – p
  - Bay-backed shrike, Lanius vittatus – R
  - Long-tailed shrike, Lanius schach – R
  - Grey-backed shrike, Lanius tephronotus – r W
  - Lesser grey shrike, Lanius minor – V
  - Great grey shrike, Lanius excubitor – V
  - Southern grey shrike, Lanius meridionalis – R
- Family: Corvidae
  - Mangrove whistler, Pachycephala grisola – r
  - Eurasian jay, Garrulus glandarius – R
  - Black-headed jay, Garrulus lanceolatus – R
  - Sri Lanka blue magpie, Urocissa ornata – V r
  - Yellow-billed blue magpie, Urocissa flavirostris – R
  - Red-billed blue magpie, Urocissa erythrorhyncha – R
  - Green magpie, Cissa chinensis – r
  - Rufous treepie, Dendrocitta vagabunda – R
  - Grey treepie, Dendrocitta formosae – R
  - White-bellied treepie, Dendrocitta leucogastra – r
  - Collared treepie, Dendrocitta frontalis – r
  - Andaman treepie, Dendrocitta bayleyi – N R
  - Black-billed magpie, Pica pica – r
  - Spotted nutcracker, Nucifraga caryocatactes – r
  - Red-billed chough, Pyrrhocorax pyrrhocorax – R
  - Alpine chough, Pyrrhocorax graculus – R
  - Eurasian jackdaw, Corvus monedula – r w
  - House crow, Corvus splendens – R
  - Rook, Corvus frugilegus – W
  - Carrion crow, Corvus corone – r w
  - Large-billed crow, Corvus macrorhynchos – R
  - Brown-necked raven, Corvus ruficollis
  - Common raven, Corvus corax – r
- Family: Artamidae
  - Ashy woodswallow, Artamus fuscus – R
  - White-breasted woodswallow, Artamus leucorynchus – r
- Family: Oriolidae
  - Eurasian golden oriole, Oriolus oriolus – R
  - Black-naped oriole, Oriolus chinensis – r w
  - Slender-billed oriole, Oriolus tenuirostris – r
  - Black-hooded oriole, Oriolus xanthornus – R
  - Maroon oriole, Oriolus traillii – r
  - Large cuckooshrike, Coracina macei – r
  - Bar-bellied cuckooshrike, Coracina striata – r
  - Black-winged cuckooshrike, Coracina melaschistos – r
  - Black-headed cuckooshrike, Coracina melanoptera – r
  - Pied triller, Lalage nigra – r
  - Rosy minivet, Pericrocotus roseus – r w
  - Swinhoe's minivet, Pericrocotus cantonensis – V
  - Ashy minivet, Pericrocotus divaricatus – W
  - Small minivet, Pericrocotus cinnamomeus – R
  - White-bellied minivet, Pericrocotus erythropygius – r
  - Grey-chinned minivet, Pericrocotus solaris – r
  - Long-tailed minivet, Pericrocotus ethologus – R
  - Short-billed minivet, Pericrocotus brevirostris – r
  - Scarlet minivet, Pericrocotus flammeus – R
  - Bar-winged flycatcher-shrike, Hemipus picatus – R
- Family: Dicruridae
  - Yellow-bellied fantail, Rhipidura hypoxantha – R
  - White-throated fantail, Rhipidura albicollis – R
  - White-browed fantail flycatcher, Rhipidura aureola – R
  - Black drongo, Dicrurus macrocercus – R
  - Ashy drongo, Dicrurus leucophaeus – R
  - White-bellied drongo, Dicrurus caerulescens – r
  - Crow-billed drongo, Dicrurus annectans – r
  - Bronzed drongo, Dicrurus aeneus – r
  - Lesser racket-tailed drongo, Dicrurus remifer – r
  - Hair-crested drongo, Dicrurus hottentottus – R
  - Andaman drongo, Dicrurus andamanensis – N R
  - Greater racket-tailed drongo, Dicrurus paradiseus – r
- Family: Monarchidae
  - Black-naped monarch, Hypothymis azurea – r
  - Asian paradise-flycatcher, Terpsiphone paradisi – R
- Family: Aegithinidae
  - Common iora, Aegithina tiphia – R
  - Marshall's iora, Aegithina nigrolutea – r
- Family: Prionopidae
  - Large woodshrike, Tephrodornis gularis – r
  - Common woodshrike, Tephrodornis pondicerianus – R
- Family: Bombycillidae
  - Bohemian waxwing, Bombycilla garrulus – V
- Family: Cinclidae
  - White-throated dipper, Cinclus cinclus – R
  - Brown dipper, Cinclus pallasii – R
- Family: Turdidae
  - Rufous-tailed rock thrush, Monticola saxatilis – s p
  - Blue-capped rock thrush, Monticola cinclorhynchus – R
  - Chestnut-bellied rock thrush, Monticola rufiventris – r
  - Blue rock thrush, Monticola solitarius – r W
  - Sri Lanka whistling thrush, Myophonus blighi – E R
  - Malabar whistling thrush, Myophonus horsfieldii – R
  - Blue whistling thrush, Myophonus caeruleus – R
  - Pied thrush, Zoothera wardii – s p
  - Orange-headed thrush, Zoothera citrina – R
  - Siberian thrush, Zoothera sibirica – W
  - Spot-winged thrush, Zoothera spiloptera – N r
  - Plain-backed thrush, Zoothera mollissima – r
  - Long-tailed thrush, Zoothera dixoni – r
  - Scaly thrush, Zoothera dauma – r
  - Long-billed thrush, Zoothera monticola – r
  - Dark-sided thrush, Zoothera marginata – r
  - Tickell's thrush, Turdus unicolor – R
  - Black-breasted thrush, Turdus dissimilis – W
  - White-collared blackbird, Turdus albocinctus – r
  - Grey-winged blackbird, Turdus boulboul – r
  - Eurasian blackbird, Turdus merula – r
  - Chestnut thrush, Turdus rubrocanus – r
  - Kessler's thrush, Turdus kessleri – V
  - Grey-sided thrush, Turdus feae – W
  - Eyebrowed thrush, Turdus obscurus – W
  - Dark-throated thrush, Turdus ruficollis – W
  - Dusky thrush, Turdus naumanni – W
  - Fieldfare, Turdus pilaris – V
  - Song thrush, Turdus philomelos – V
  - Mistle thrush, Turdus viscivorus – r
  - Ashy-headed laughingthrush, Garrulax cinereifrons – V r
  - White-throated laughingthrush, Garrulax albogularis – R
  - White-crested laughingthrush, Garrulax leucolophus – R
  - Lesser necklaced laughingthrush, Garrulax monileger – r
  - Greater necklaced laughingthrush, Garrulax pectoralis – r
  - Striated laughingthrush, Garrulax striatus – r
  - Rufous-necked laughingthrush, Garrulax ruficollis – r
  - Chestnut-backed laughingthrush, Garrulax nuchalis – N r
  - Yellow-throated laughingthrush, Garrulax galbanus – r
  - Wynaad laughingthrush, Garrulax delesserti – r
  - Rufous-vented laughingthrush, Garrulax gularis – r
  - Moustached laughingthrush, Garrulax cineraceus – r
  - Rufous-chinned laughingthrush, Garrulax rufogularis – r
  - Spotted laughingthrush, Garrulax ocellatus – r
  - Grey-sided laughingthrush, Garrulax caerulatus – r
  - Spot-breasted laughingthrush, Garrulax merulinus – r
  - White-browed laughingthrush, Garrulax sannio – r
  - Nilgiri laughingthrush, Garrulax cachinnans – E r
  - Grey-breasted laughingthrush, Garrulax jerdoni – N r
  - Streaked laughingthrush, Garrulax lineatus – R
  - Striped laughingthrush, Garrulax virgatus – r
  - Brown-capped laughingthrush, Garrulax austeni – r
  - Blue-winged laughingthrush, Garrulax squamatus – r
  - Scaly laughingthrush, Garrulax subunicolor – r
  - Elliot's laughingthrush, Garrulax elliotii – r
  - Variegated laughingthrush, Garrulax variegatus – r
  - Brown-cheeked laughingthrush, Garrulax henrici – r
  - Black-faced laughingthrush, Garrulax affinis – r
  - Chestnut-crowned laughingthrush, Garrulax erythrocephalus – r
  - Red-faced liocichla, Liocichla phoenicea – r
  - Bugun liocichla, Liocichla bugunorum
  - Gould's shortwing, Brachypteryx stellata – r
  - Rusty-bellied shortwing, Brachypteryx hyperythra – V r
  - White-bellied shortwing, Brachypteryx major – V r
  - Lesser shortwing, Brachypteryx leucophrys – r
  - White-browed shortwing, Brachypteryx montana – r
- Family: Muscicapidae
  - Brown-chested jungle flycatcher, Rhinomyias brunneata – w r ?
  - Spotted flycatcher, Muscicapa striata – p
  - Dark-sided flycatcher, Muscicapa sibirica – r
  - Asian brown flycatcher, Muscicapa dauurica – r w
  - Rusty-tailed flycatcher, Muscicapa ruficauda – r
  - Brown-breasted flycatcher, Muscicapa muttui – r
  - Ferruginous flycatcher, Muscicapa ferruginea – r
  - Yellow-rumped flycatcher, Ficedula zanthopygia – V
  - Slaty-backed flycatcher, Ficedula hodgsonii – r
  - Rufous-gorgeted flycatcher, Ficedula strophiata – r
  - Red-throated flycatcher, Ficedula albicilla – W
  - Kashmir flycatcher, Ficedula subrubra – V r
  - White-gorgeted flycatcher, Ficedula monileger – r
  - Snowy-browed flycatcher, Ficedula hyperythra – r
  - Little pied flycatcher, Ficedula westermanni – r
  - Ultramarine flycatcher, Ficedula superciliaris – r
  - Slaty-blue flycatcher, Ficedula tricolor – r
  - Sapphire flycatcher, Ficedula sapphira – r
  - Black-and-orange flycatcher, Ficedula nigrorufa – N r
  - Verditer flycatcher, Eumyias thalassina – R
  - Dull-blue flycatcher, Eumyias sordida – N r
  - Nilgiri flycatcher, Eumyias albicaudata – N r
  - Large niltava, Niltava grandis – r
  - Small niltava, Niltava macgrigoriae – r
  - Rufous-bellied niltava, Niltava sundara – r
  - Vivid niltava, Niltava vivida – r
  - White-tailed flycatcher, Cyornis concretus – r
  - White-bellied blue flycatcher, Cyornis pallipes – r
  - Pale-chinned blue-flycatcher, Cyornis poliogenys – r
  - Pale blue flycatcher, Cyornis unicolor – r
  - Blue-throated flycatcher, Cyornis rubeculoides – r
  - Tickell's blue flycatcher, Cyornis tickelliae – R
  - Pygmy blue flycatcher, Muscicapella hodgsoni – r
  - Grey-headed canary flycatcher, Culicicapa ceylonensis – R
  - Nightingale, Luscinia megarhynchos – V
  - Siberian rubythroat, Luscinia calliope – W
  - White-tailed rubythroat, Luscinia pectoralis – r W
  - Bluethroat, Luscinia svecica – s W
  - Firethroat, Luscinia pectardens – N V
  - Indian blue robin, Luscinia brunnea – r
  - Siberian blue robin, Luscinia cyane – V
  - Red-flanked bluetail, Tarsiger cyanurus – r
  - Golden bush robin, Tarsiger chrysaeus – r
  - White-browed bush robin, Tarsiger indicus – r
  - Rufous-breasted bush robin, Tarsiger hyperythrus – r
  - Rufous-tailed scrub robin, Cercotrichas galactotes – p
  - Oriental magpie robin, Copsychus saularis – R
  - White-rumped shama, Copsychus malabaricus – R
  - Indian robin, Saxicoloides fulicata – R
  - Rufous-backed redstart, Phoenicurus erythronota – W
  - Blue-capped redstart, Phoenicurus coeruleocephalus – r
  - Black redstart, Phoenicurus ochruros – r W
  - Common redstart, Phoenicurus phoenicurus – P
  - Hodgson's redstart, Phoenicurus hodgsoni – W
  - White-throated redstart, Phoenicurus schisticeps – r
  - Daurian redstart, Phoenicurus auroreus – r w
  - White-winged redstart, Phoenicurus erythrogaster – r
  - Blue-fronted redstart, Phoenicurus frontalis – r
  - White-capped water redstart, Chaimarrornis leucocephalus – r
  - Plumbeous water redstart, Rhyacornis fuliginosus – r
  - White-bellied redstart, Hodgsonius phaenicuroides – r
  - White-tailed robin, Myiomela leucura – r
  - Blue-fronted robin, Cinclidium frontale – r
  - Grandala, Grandala coelicolor – r
  - Little forktail, Enicurus scouleri – r
  - Black-backed forktail, Enicurus immaculatus – r
  - Slaty-backed forktail, Enicurus schistaceus – r
  - White-crowned forktail, Enicurus leschenaulti – r
  - Spotted forktail, Enicurus maculatus – r
  - Purple cochoa, Cochoa purpurea – r
  - Green cochoa, Cochoa viridis – r
  - Stoliczka's bushchat, Saxicola macrorhyncha – V r
  - Hodgson's bushchat, Saxicola insignis – V w
  - Siberian stonechat, Saxicola maura – R
  - White-tailed stonechat, Saxicola leucura – r
  - Pied bushchat, Saxicola caprata – R
  - Jerdon's bushchat, Saxicola jerdoni – r
  - Grey bushchat, Saxicola ferrea – R
  - Hooded wheatear, Oenanthe monacha
  - Hume's wheatear, Oenanthe alboniger – r
  - Northern wheatear, Oenanthe oenanthe – P
  - Finsch's wheatear, Oenanthe finschii – r w
  - Variable wheatear, Oenanthe picata – r w
  - Pied wheatear, Oenanthe pleschanka – r w
  - Rufous-tailed wheatear, Oenanthe xanthoprymna – r w
  - Desert wheatear, Oenanthe deserti – r w
  - Isabelline wheatear, Oenanthe isabellina – r w
  - Brown rock-chat, Cercomela fusca – R
- Family: Sturnidae
  - Asian glossy starling, Aplonis panayensis – r
  - Spot-winged starling, Saroglossa spiloptera – r
  - White-faced starling, Sturnus senex – V r
  - Chestnut-tailed starling, Sturnus malabaricus – R
  - White-headed starling, Sturnus erythropygius – r
  - Brahminy starling, Sturnus pagodarum – R
  - Purple-backed starling, Sturnus sturninus – V
  - White-shouldered starling, Sturnus sinensis – V
  - Rose-coloured starling, Sturnus roseus – W P
  - Common starling, Sturnus vulgaris – w p
  - Asian pied starling, Sturnus contra – R
  - Common myna, Acridotheres tristis – R
  - Bank myna, Acridotheres ginginianus – R
  - Jungle myna, Acridotheres fuscus – R
  - White-vented myna, Acridotheres cinereus – r
  - Collared myna, Acridotheres albocinctus – r
  - Golden-crested myna, Ampeliceps coronatus – r
  - Sri Lanka myna, Gracula ptilogenys – r N
  - Hill myna, Gracula religiosa – r
- Family: Sittidae
  - Chestnut-vented nuthatch, Sitta nagaensis – r
  - Kashmir nuthatch, Sitta cashmirensis – r
  - Chestnut-bellied nuthatch, Sitta castanea – R
  - White-tailed nuthatch, Sitta himalayensis – r
  - White-cheeked nuthatch, Sitta leucopsis – r
  - Eastern rock nuthatch, Sitta tephronota
  - Velvet-fronted nuthatch, Sitta frontalis – R
  - Beautiful nuthatch, Sitta formosa – V r
- Family: Tichodromidae
  - Wallcreeper, Tichodroma muraria – r w
- Family: Certhiidae
  - Eurasian treecreeper, Certhia familiaris – R
  - Bar-tailed treecreeper, Certhia himalayana – R
  - Rusty-flanked treecreeper, Certhia nipalensis – r
  - Brown-throated treecreeper, Certhia discolor – r
  - Spotted creeper, Salpornis spilonotus – r
- Family: Troglodytidae
  - Winter wren, Troglodytes troglodytes – r
- Family: Paridae
  - White-crowned penduline tit, Remiz coronatus – r
  - Fire-capped tit, Cephalopyrus flammiceps – r
  - Rufous-naped tit, Parus rufonuchalis – r
  - Rufous-vented tit, Parus rubidiventris – r
  - Spot-winged tit, Parus melanolophus – r
  - Coal tit, Parus ater – r
  - Grey-crested tit, Parus dichrous – r
  - Brown crested tit
  - Great tit, Parus major – R
  - Green-backed tit, Parus monticolus – R
  - White-naped tit, Parus nuchalis – r
  - Black-lored tit, Parus xanthogenys – r
  - Yellow-cheeked tit, Parus spilonotus – r
  - Azure tit, Parus cyanus
  - Yellow-breasted tit, Parus flavipectus
  - Yellow-browed tit, Sylviparus modestus – r
  - Sultan tit, Melanochlora sultanea – r
  - Hume's ground tit, Pseudopodoces humilis – r
- Family: Aegithalidae
  - White-cheeked tit, Aegithalos leucogenys – r
  - Black-throated tit, Aegithalos concinnus – R
  - White-throated tit, Aegithalos niveogularis – r
  - Rufous-fronted tit, Aegithalos iouschistos – r
- Family: Hirundinidae
  - Pale martin, Riparia diluta – p r ?
  - Sand martin, Riparia riparia – r
  - Plain martin, Riparia paludicola – R
  - Crag martin, Hirundo rupestris – r
  - Rock martin, Hirundo fuligula – V
  - Dusky crag martin, Hirundo concolor – R
  - Barn swallow, Hirundo rustica – R W
  - Pacific swallow, Hirundo tahitica – r
  - Wire-tailed swallow, Hirundo smithii – R
  - Red-rumped swallow, Hirundo daurica – R W
  - Striated swallow, Hirundo striolata – r
  - Streak-throated swallow, Hirundo fluvicola – R
  - Common house martin, Delichon urbica – r w
  - Asian house martin, Delichon dasypus – r
  - Nepal house martin, Delichon nipalensis – r
- Family: Regulidae
  - Goldcrest, Regulus regulus – r
- Family: Pycnonotidae
  - Crested finchbill, Spizixos canifrons – r
  - Striated bulbul, Pycnonotus striatus – r
  - Grey-headed bulbul, Pycnonotus priocephalus – r
  - Black-headed bulbul, Pycnonotus atriceps – r
  - Black-crested bulbul, Pycnonotus melanicterus – R
  - Red-whiskered bulbul, Pycnonotus jocosus – R
  - White-eared bulbul, Pycnonotus leucotis – R
  - Himalayan bulbul, Pycnonotus leucogenys – R
  - Red-vented bulbul, Pycnonotus cafer – R
  - Yellow-throated bulbul, Pycnonotus xantholaemus – V r
  - Yellow-eared bulbul, Pynconotus penicillatus – V r
  - Flavescent bulbul, Pycnonotus flavescens – r
  - White-browed bulbul, Pycnonotus luteolus – r
  - White-throated bulbul, Alophoixus flaveolus – r
  - Olive bulbul, Iole virescens – r
  - Yellow-browed bulbul, Iole indica – r
  - Ashy bulbul, Hemixos flavala – r
  - Mountain bulbul, Hypsipetes mcclellandii – r
  - Black bulbul, Hypsipetes leucocephalus – R
  - Nicobar bulbul, Hypsipetes nicobariensis – V r
- Family: Hypocoliidae
  - Grey hypocolius, Hypocolius ampelinus – W
- Family: Cisticolidae
  - Zitting cisticola, Cisticola juncidis – R
  - Bright-headed cisticola, Cisticola exilis – r
  - Streaked scrub warbler, Scotocerca inquieta – r
  - Rufous-vented prinia, Prinia burnesii – N r
  - Striated prinia, Prinia criniger – R
  - Hill prinia, Prinia atrogularis – r
  - Grey-crowned prinia, Prinia cinereocapilla – V r
  - Rufous-fronted prinia, Prinia buchanani – R
  - Rufescent prinia, Prinia rufescens – r
  - Grey-breasted prinia, Prinia hodgsonii – R
  - Graceful prinia, Prinia gracilis – R
  - Jungle prinia, Prinia sylvatica – R
  - Yellow-bellied prinia, Prinia flaviventris – R
  - Ashy prinia, Prinia socialis – R
  - Plain prinia, Prinia inornata – R
- Family: Zosteropidae
  - Sri Lanka white-eye, Zosterops ceylonensis – R
  - Oriental white-eye, Zosterops palpebrosus – R
