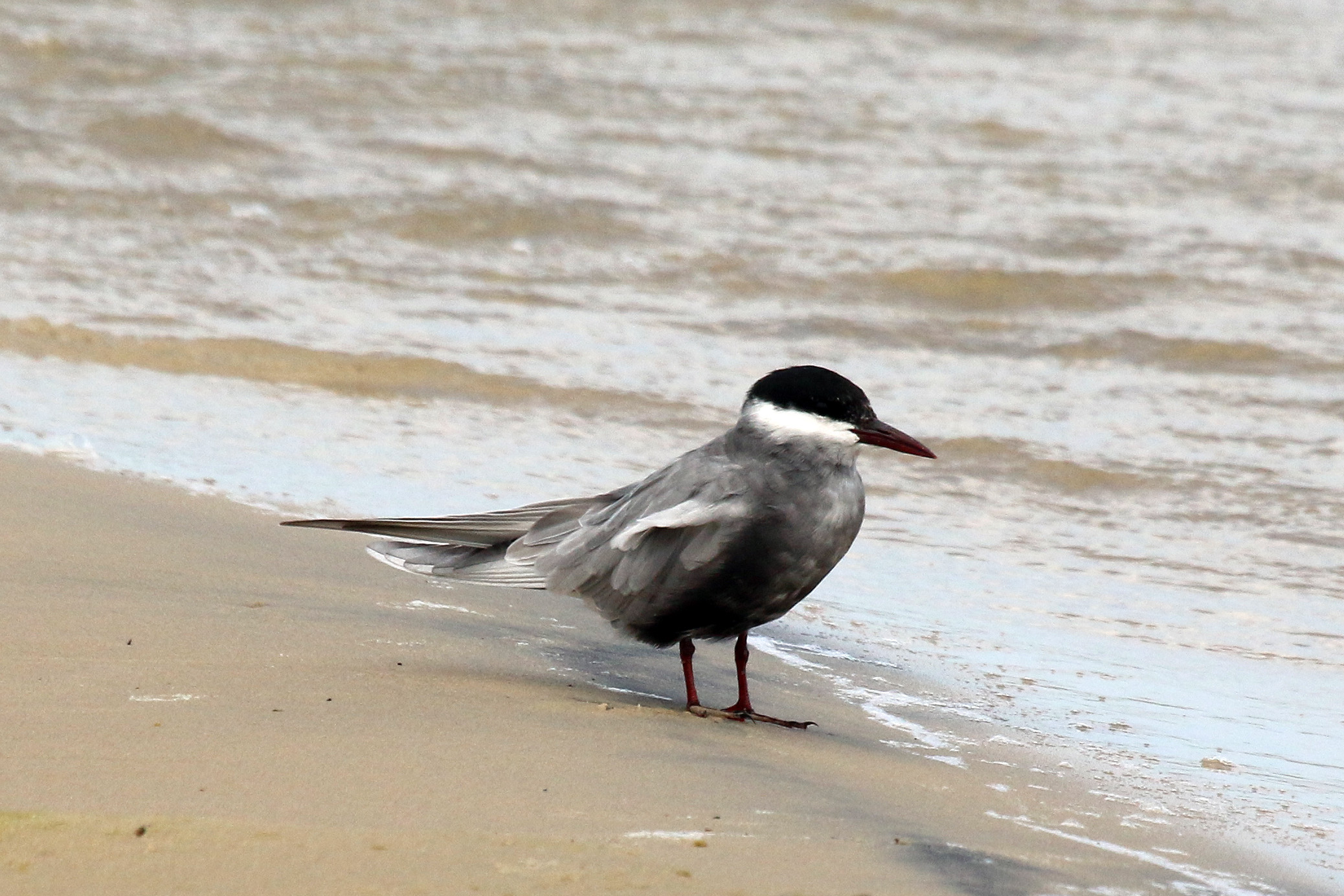
- C. h. delalandii summer (breeding) plumage, South Africa
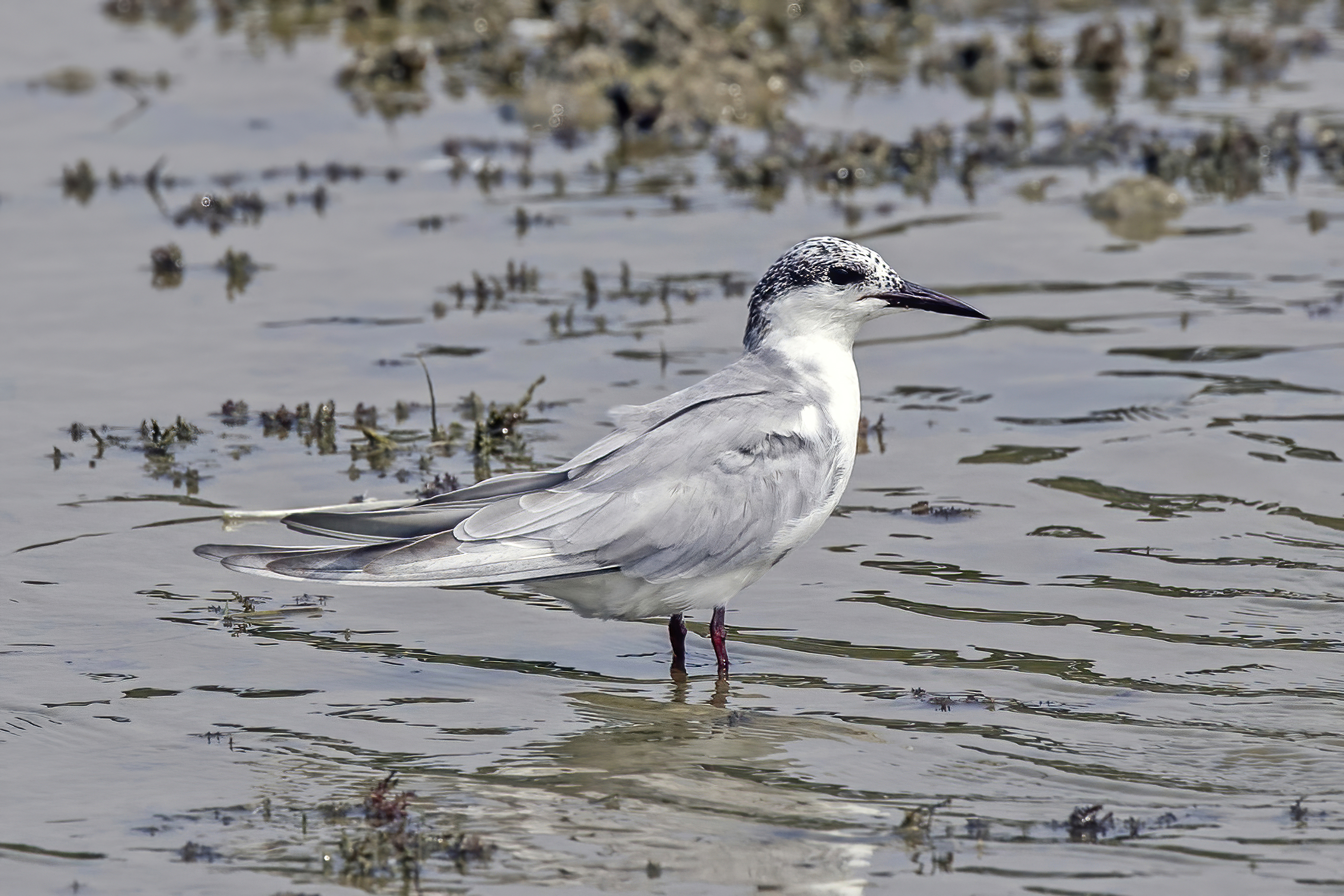
- C. h. hybrida winter (non-breeding) plumage, Sri Lanka

Conservation status
- Least Concern (IUCN 3.1)

Scientific classification
- Kingdom: Animalia
- Phylum: Chordata
- Class: Aves
- Order: Charadriiformes
- Family: Laridae
- Genus: Chlidonias
- Species: C. hybrida

Binomial name
- Chlidonias hybrida (Pallas, 1811)

Subspecies
- C. h. hybrida – (Pallas, 1811) (Eurasian Whiskered Tern); C. h. delalandii – (Mathews, 1912) (African Whiskered Tern); C. h. javanicus – (Horsfield, 1821) (Australasian Whiskered Tern)
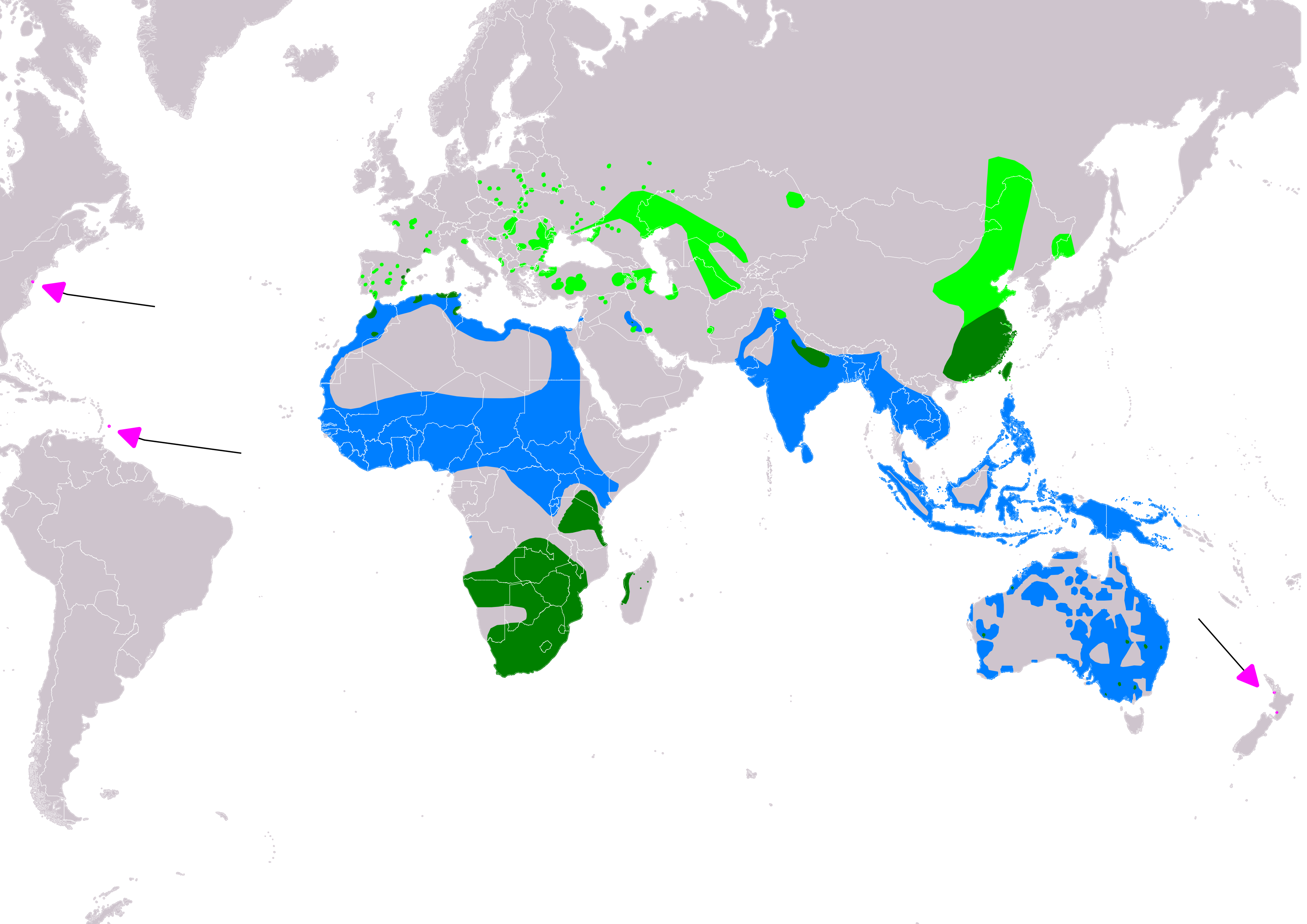
- Range of Ch. hybrida Breeding Resident Non-breeding Vagrant (seasonality uncertain)

Synonyms
- Chlidonias hybridus

= Whiskered tern =

Species of bird

The whiskered tern (Chlidonias hybrida) is a tern in the family Laridae. The genus name is from Ancient Greek khelidonios, "swallow-like", from khelidon, "swallow". The specific hybridus is Latin for hybrid; Peter Simon Pallas thought it might be a hybrid of white-winged black tern and common tern, writing "Sterna fissipes [Chlidonias leucopterus] et Hirundine [Sterna hirundo] natam".

== Subspecies ==
This bird has a number of geographical races, differing mainly in size and minor plumage details.

Image	Subspecies	Description	Distribution
	C. h. hybrida (Pallas, 1811) (Eurasian Whiskered Tern)	nominate	breeds in warmer parts of Europe and the Palearctic (northwestern Africa and central and southern Europe to southeastern Siberia, eastern China and south to Pakistan and northern India).
	C. h. delalandii (Mathews, 1912) (African Whiskered Tern)	Smaller-billed and darker	found in east and south Africa
	C. h. javanicus (Horsfield, 1821) (Australasian Whiskered Tern)	paler	from Java to Australia.

The tropical forms are resident, but European and Asian birds winter south to Africa and the Indian subcontinent. A tagged whiskered tern was spotted at Manakudi Bird Sanctuary, Kanniyakumari District of Tamil Nadu, India in the month of April 2021.

This species breeds in colonies on inland marshes, sometimes amongst black-headed gulls, which provide some protection. The scientific name arises from the fact that this, the largest marsh tern, show similarities in appearance to both the white Sterna terns and to black tern.

== Description ==
The size, black cap, strong bill (29–34 mm in males, 25–27 mm and stubbier in females, with a pronounced gonys) and more positive flight recall common or Arctic tern, but the short, forked-looking tail and dark grey breeding plumage above and below are typically marsh tern characteristics. The summer adult has white cheeks and red legs and bill. The crown is flecked with white in the juvenile, and the hindcrown is more uniformly blackish, though in the winter adult this too is flecked with white. The black ear-coverts are joined to the black of the hindcrown, and the space above is mottled with white, causing the black to appear as a C-shaped band. The sides of the neck are white; this sometimes continues across the nape. The collar is less sharply defined. All through the year the rump is pale grey. In the juvenile, the mantle has a variegated pattern. The feathers of the back and scapulars are dark brown, with prominent broad buff edgings and often subterminal buff bars or centers. There is usually an admixture of new gray feathers, especially on the mantle, quite early in the fall. The mantle is silvery-gray in the adult. The call is a characteristic krekk.

In winter, the forehead becomes white and the body plumage a much paler grey. Juvenile whiskered terns have a ginger scaly back, and otherwise look much like winter adults. The first winter plumage is intermediate between juvenile and adult winter, with patchy ginger on the back.

The whiskered tern eats small fish, amphibians, insects and crustaceans.

== Gallery ==
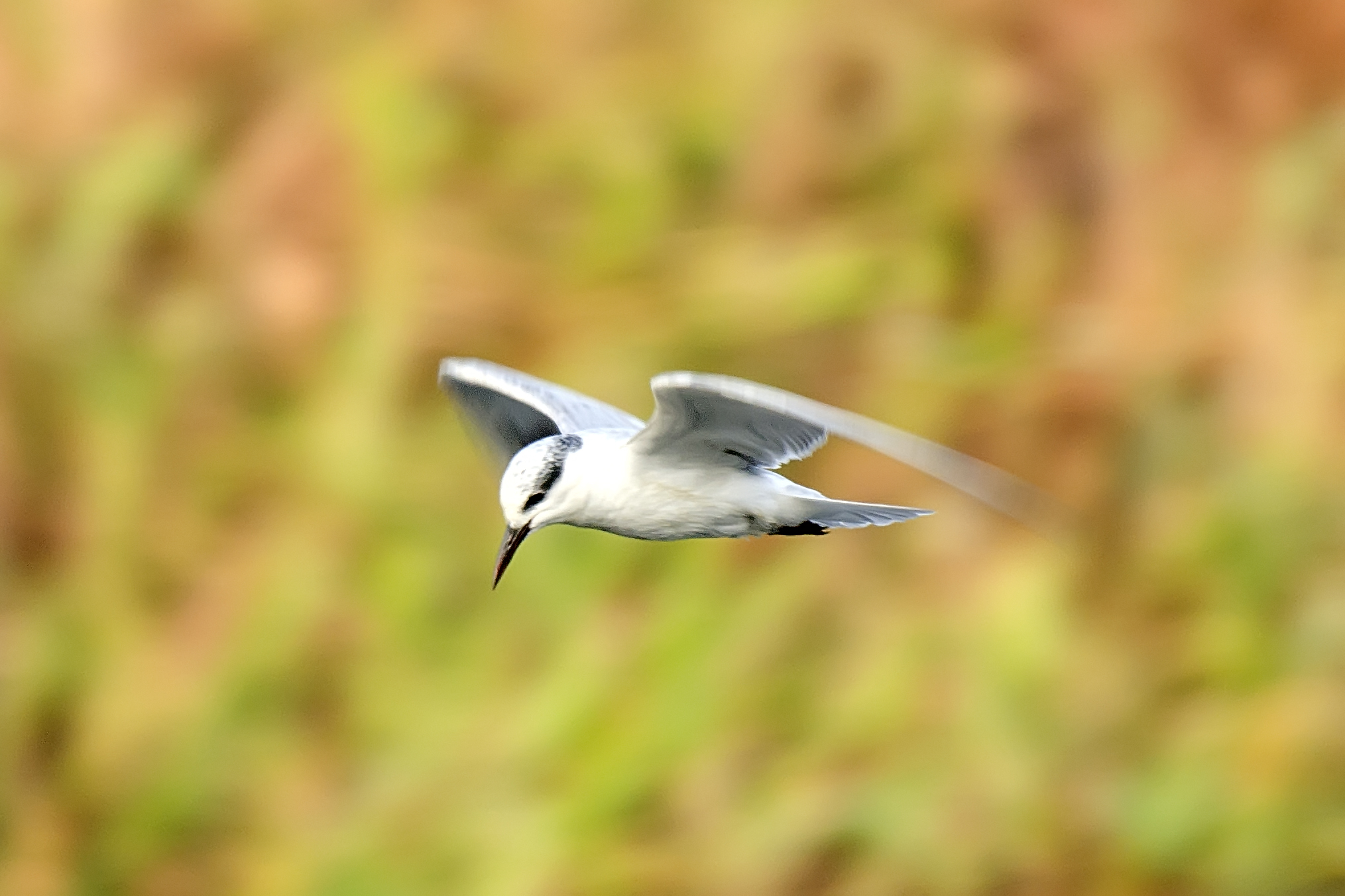
C. h. hybrida, non-breeding plumage

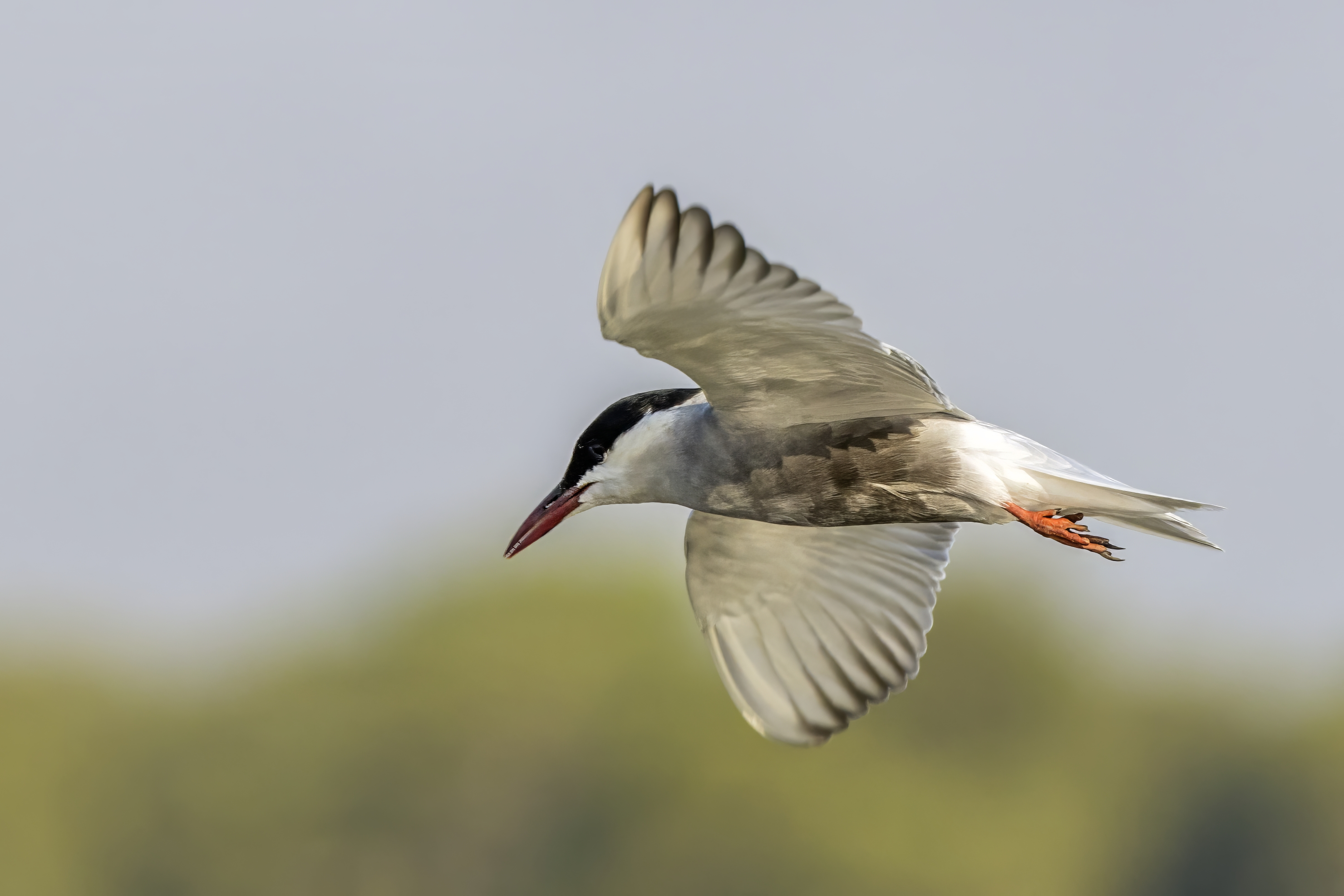
C. h. javanicus, breeding plumage

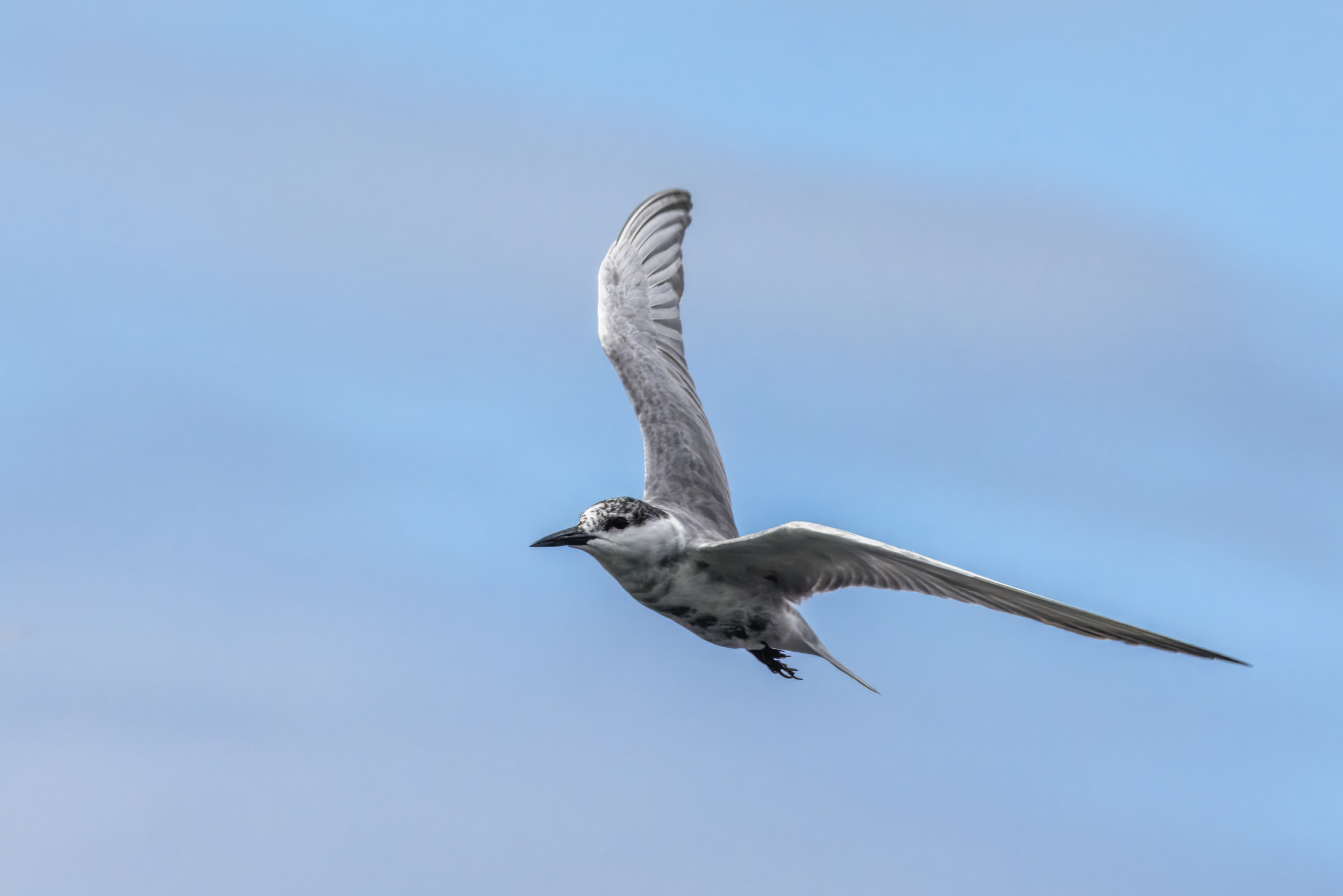
C. h. javanicus, non-breeding plumage

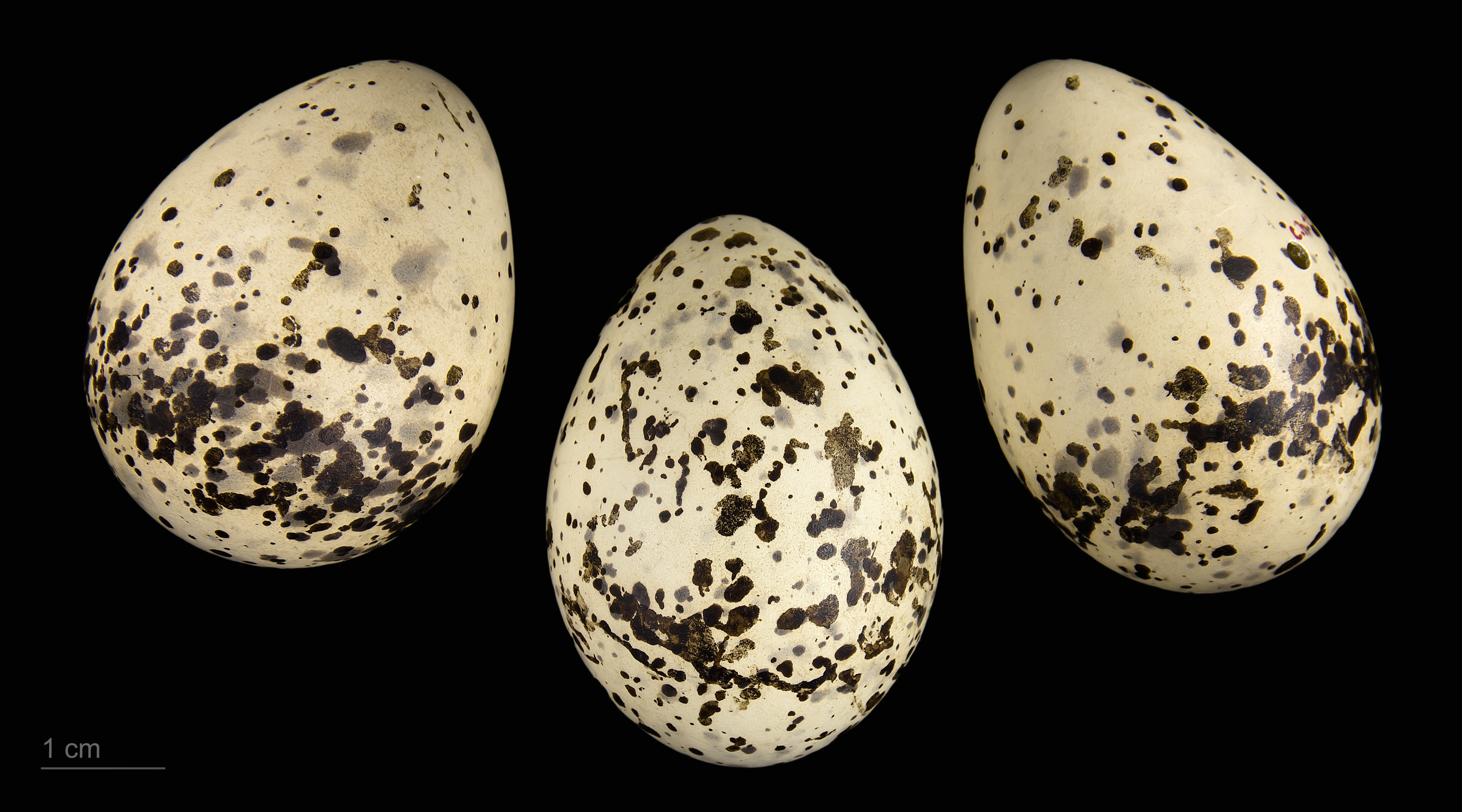
Eggs of Chlidonias hybrida
