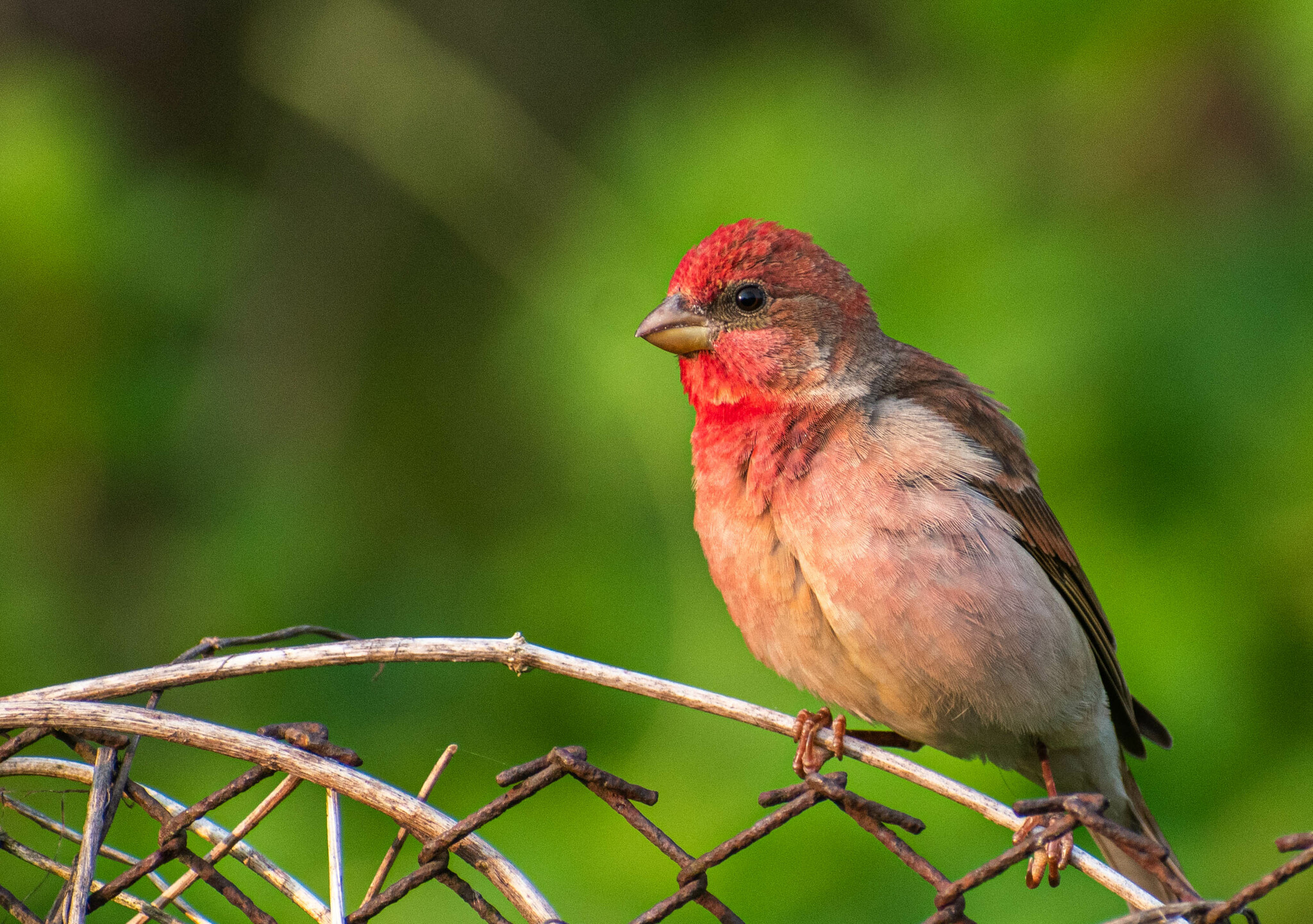
- Male in Russia
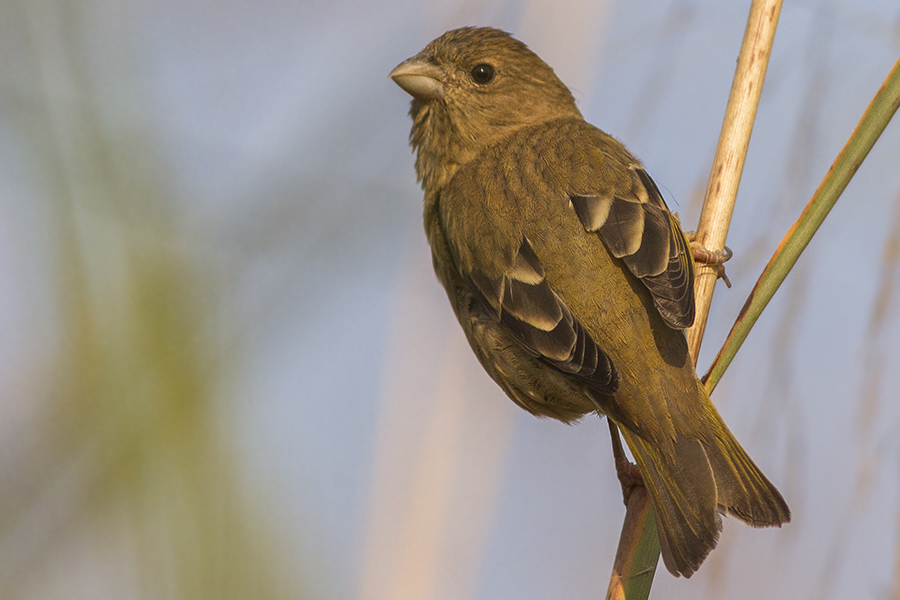
- Female at Baur reservoir in Uttarakhand, India

Conservation status
- Least Concern (IUCN 3.1)

Scientific classification
- Kingdom: Animalia
- Phylum: Chordata
- Class: Aves
- Order: Passeriformes
- Family: Fringillidae
- Subfamily: Carduelinae
- Genus: Carpodacus
- Species: C. erythrinus

Binomial name
- Carpodacus erythrinus (Pallas, 1770)
- Range of C. erythrinus Breeding Non-breeding

Synonyms
- Erythrina erythrina

= Common rosefinch =

Species of bird

The common rosefinch (Carpodacus erythrinus) or scarlet rosefinch is the most widespread and common rosefinch of Asia and Europe.

== Taxonomy ==
In a molecular phylogenetic study of the finch family published in 2012, Zuccon and colleagues found that the common rosefinch fell outside the core Carpodacus rosefinch clade and was a sister to the scarlet finch (at the time Haematospiza sipahi). They recommended that the common rosefinch should be moved to a new monotypic genus with the resurrected name of Erythrina. The British Ornithologists' Union accepted this proposal, but the International Ornithological Union chose instead to adopt a more inclusive Carpodacus that retained the common rosefinch in the rosefinch genus.

The genus name is from Ancient Greek karpos, "fruit" and dakno, "to bite", and the specific erythrinus is from Latin erythros, "red".

== Description ==
Song of common rosefinch

The common rosefinch is 13–15 cm (5.1–5.9 in) in length. It has a stout and conical bill. The mature male has brilliant rosy-carmine head, breast and rump; heavy bill; dark brown wings with two indistinct bars, and a white belly. Females and young males are dull-colored with yellowish-brown above, brighter on the rump and greyer on head; buff below.

Adults moult in their winter quarters, between September and November. After moulting the red of male is subdued, and becomes brighter during the winter due to wear of the feathers.

A rare form exists, in which the red colouring of males is replaced by yellow. The cause is environmental, rather than genetic, being affected by diet and the presence of parasites.

== Distribution and habitat ==
It has spread westward through Europe; in recent decades, it has been observed in Portugal, and has occurred in the British Isles as a rare visitor, with some breeding records in recent years. Common rosefinches breed from the Danube valley, Sweden, and Siberia to the Bering Sea; the Caucasus, northern Iran and Afghanistan, the western Himalayas, Tibet and China; to Japan between latitudes 25° and 68°. In winter they are found from southern Iran to south-east China, India, Burma, and Indochina. It occurs as a vagrant in Sri Lanka.

They are found in summer in thickets, woodland and forest edges near rivers and in winter in gardens and orchards, wetlands and locally in dry oak woods.

== Behaviour ==
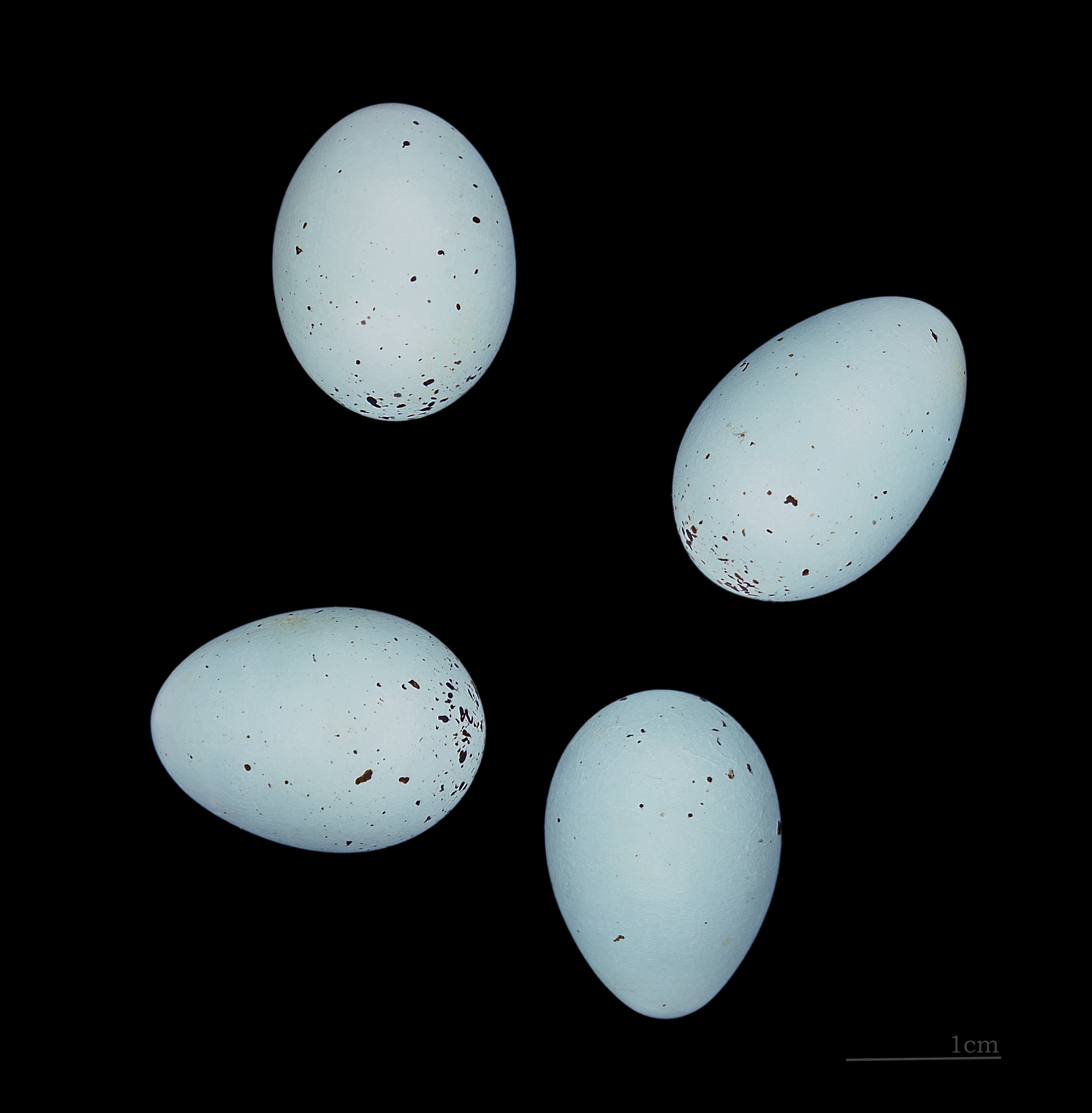
A clutch of eggs

Footage of several males

The nest is placed low in a bush. The eggs are dark blue with coarse dark brown spots, and a typical clutch contains five eggs.
