= List of birds of Laos =

This is a list of the bird species recorded in Laos. The avifauna of Laos include a total of 779 species, of which two have been introduced by humans.

This list's taxonomic treatment (designation and sequence of orders, families and species) and nomenclature (common and scientific names) follow the conventions of The Clements Checklist of Birds of the World, 2022 edition. The family accounts at the beginning of each heading reflect this taxonomy, as do the species counts found in each family account. Introduced and accidental species are included in the total counts for Laos.

The following tags have been used to highlight several categories, but not all species fall into one of these categories. Those that do not are commonly occurring native species.

- (A) Accidental - a species that rarely or accidentally occurs in Laos
- (E) Endemic - a species endemic to Laos
- (I) Introduced - a species introduced to Laos as a consequence, direct or indirect, of human actions

== Ducks, geese, and waterfowl ==
Order: Anseriformes Family: Anatidae

Anatidae includes the ducks and most duck-like waterfowl, such as geese and swans. These birds are adapted to an aquatic existence with webbed feet, flattened bills, and feathers that are excellent at shedding water due to an oily coating.

- Lesser whistling-duck, Dendrocygna javanica
- Bar-headed goose, Anser indicus
- Graylag goose, Anser anser
- Swan goose, Anser cygnoides
- Knob-billed duck, Sarkidiornis melanotos
- Ruddy shelduck, Tadorna ferruginea
- Common shelduck, Tadorna tadorna
- Cotton pygmy-goose, Nettapus coromandelianus
- Mandarin duck, Aix galericulata (A)
- Garganey, Spatula querquedula
- Falcated duck, Mareca falcata
- Eurasian wigeon, Mareca penelope
- Indian spot-billed duck, Anas poecilorhyncha
- Eastern spot-billed duck, Anas zonorhyncha
- Northern pintail, Anas acuta
- Green-winged teal, Anas crecca
- White-winged duck, Asarcornis scutulata
- Ferruginous duck, Aythya nyroca (A)
- Baer's pochard, Aythya baeri (A)
- Tufted duck, Aythya fuligula (A)

== Pheasants, grouse, and allies ==
Order: Galliformes Family: Phasianidae

The Phasianidae are a family of terrestrial birds which consists of quails, partridges, snowcocks, francolins, spurfowls, tragopans, monals, pheasants, peafowls and jungle fowls. In general, they are plump (although they vary in size) and have broad, relatively short wings.

- Rufous-throated partridge, Arborophila rufogularis
- Bar-backed partridge, Arborophila brunneopectus
- Silver pheasant, Lophura nycthemera
- Siamese fireback, Lophura diardi
- Vietnamese crested argus, Rheinardia ocellata
- Green peafowl, Pavo muticus (A)
- Scaly-breasted partridge, Tropicoperdix chloropus
- Gray peacock-pheasant, Polyplectron bicalcaratum
- Mountain bamboo-partridge, Bambusicola fytchii
- Red junglefowl, Gallus gallus
- Chinese francolin, Francolinus pintadeanus
- Blue-breasted quail, Synoicus chinensis
- Japanese quail, Coturnix japonica

== Grebes ==
Order: Podicipediformes Family: Podicipedidae

Grebes are small to medium-large freshwater diving birds. They have lobed toes and are excellent swimmers and divers. However, they have their feet placed far back on the body, making them quite ungainly on land.

- Little grebe, Tachybaptus ruficollis

== Pigeons and doves ==
Order: Columbiformes Family: Columbidae

Pigeons and doves are stout-bodied birds with short necks and short slender bills with a fleshy cere.

- Rock pigeon, Columba livia
- Speckled wood-pigeon, Columba hodgsonii
- Ashy wood-pigeon, Columba pulchricollis (A)
- Pale-capped pigeon, Columba punicea
- Oriental turtle-dove, Streptopelia orientalis
- Eurasian collared-dove, Streptopelia decaocto (A)
- Red collared-dove, Streptopelia tranquebarica
- Spotted dove, Streptopelia chinensis
- Barred cuckoo-dove, Macropygia unchall
- Little cuckoo-dove, Macropygia ruficeps
- Asian emerald dove, Chalcophaps indica
- Zebra dove, Geopelia striata (I)
- Orange-breasted green-pigeon, Treron bicincta
- Ashy-headed green-pigeon, Treron phayrei
- Thick-billed green-pigeon, Treron curvirostra
- Yellow-footed green-pigeon, Treron phoenicoptera
- Yellow-vented green-pigeon, Treron seimundi
- Pin-tailed green-pigeon, Treron apicauda
- Wedge-tailed green-pigeon, Treron sphenura
- White-bellied green-pigeon, Treron sieboldii
- Green imperial-pigeon, Ducula aenea
- Mountain imperial-pigeon, Ducula badia

== Cuckoos ==
Order: Cuculiformes Family: Cuculidae

The family Cuculidae includes cuckoos, roadrunners and anis. These birds are of variable size with slender bodies, long tails and strong legs. The Old World cuckoos are brood parasites.

- Coral-billed ground-cuckoo, Carpococcyx renauldi
- Greater coucal, Centropus sinensis
- Lesser coucal, Centropus bengalensis
- Green-billed malkoha, Phaenicophaeus tristis
- Chestnut-winged cuckoo, Clamator coromandus
- Asian koel, Eudynamys scolopacea
- Asian emerald cuckoo, Chrysococcyx maculatus
- Violet cuckoo, Chrysococcyx xanthorhynchus
- Banded bay cuckoo, Cacomantis sonneratii
- Plaintive cuckoo, Cacomantis merulinus
- Square-tailed drongo-cuckoo, Surniculus lugubris
- Moustached hawk-cuckoo, Hierococcyx vagans (A)
- Large hawk-cuckoo, Hierococcyx sparverioides
- Northern hawk-cuckoo, Hierococcyx hyperythrus
- Hodgson's hawk-cuckoo, Hierococcyx nisicolor
- Lesser cuckoo, Cuculus poliocephalus
- Indian cuckoo, Cuculus micropterus
- Himalayan cuckoo, Cuculus saturatus
- Common cuckoo, Cuculus canorus

== Frogmouths ==
Order: Caprimulgiformes Family: Podargidae

The frogmouths are a group of nocturnal birds related to the nightjars. They are named for their large flattened hooked bill and huge frog-like gape, which they use to take insects.

- Hodgson's frogmouth, Batrachostomus hodgsoni
- Blyth's frogmouth, Batrachostomus affinis

== Nightjars and allies ==
Order: Caprimulgiformes Family: Caprimulgidae

Nightjars are medium-sized nocturnal birds that usually nest on the ground. They have long wings, short legs and very short bills. Most have small feet, of little use for walking, and long pointed wings. Their soft plumage is camouflaged to resemble bark or leaves.

- Great eared-nightjar, Lyncornis macrotis
- Gray nightjar, Caprimulgus jotaka
- Large-tailed nightjar, Caprimulgus macrurus
- Indian nightjar, Caprimulgus asiaticus
- Savanna nightjar, Caprimulgus affinis

== Swifts ==
Order: Caprimulgiformes Family: Apodidae

Swifts are small birds which spend the majority of their lives flying. These birds have very short legs and never settle voluntarily on the ground, perching instead only on vertical surfaces. Many swifts have long swept-back wings which resemble a crescent or boomerang.

- White-throated needletail, Hirundapus caudacutus
- Silver-backed needletail, Hirundapus cochinchinensis
- Brown-backed needletail, Hirundapus giganteus
- Himalayan swiftlet, Aerodramus brevirostris
- White-nest swiftlet, Aerodramus fuciphagus
- Germain's swiftlet, Aerodramus germani
- Pacific swift, Apus pacificus
- Cook's swift, Apus cooki
- House swift, Apus nipalensis
- Asian palm-swift, Cypsiurus balasiensis

== Treeswifts ==
Order: Caprimulgiformes Family: Hemiprocnidae

The treeswifts, also called crested swifts, are closely related to the true swifts. They differ from the other swifts in that they have crests, long forked tails and softer plumage.

- Crested treeswift, Hemiprocne coronata

== Rails, gallinules, and coots ==
Order: Gruiformes Family: Rallidae

Rallidae is a large family of small to medium-sized birds which includes the rails, crakes, coots and gallinules. Typically they inhabit dense vegetation in damp environments near lakes, swamps or rivers. In general they are shy and secretive birds, making them difficult to observe. Most species have strong legs and long toes which are well adapted to soft uneven surfaces. They tend to have short, rounded wings and to be weak fliers.

- Brown-cheeked rail, Rallus indicus (A)
- Slaty-breasted rail, Lewinia striata
- Eurasian moorhen, Gallinula chloropus
- Eurasian coot, Fulica atra
- Gray-headed swamphen, Porphyrio poliocephalus
- White-browed crake, Poliolimnas cinereus (A)
- Watercock, Gallicrex cinerea
- White-breasted waterhen, Amaurornis phoenicurus
- Red-legged crake, Rallina fasciata
- Slaty-legged crake, Rallina eurizonoides
- Ruddy-breasted crake, Zapornia fusca
- Baillon's crake, Zapornia pusilla
- Black-tailed crake, Zapornia bicolor

== Finfoots ==
Order: Gruiformes Family: Heliornithidae

Heliornithidae is a small family of tropical birds with webbed lobes on their feet similar to those of grebes and coots.

- Masked finfoot, Heliopais personata

== Cranes ==
Order: Gruiformes Family: Gruidae

Cranes are large, long-legged and long-necked birds. Unlike the similar-looking but unrelated herons, cranes fly with necks outstretched, not pulled back. Most have elaborate and noisy courting displays or "dances".

- Sarus crane, Antigone antigone

== Thick-knees ==
Order: Charadriiformes Family: Burhinidae

The thick-knees are a group of largely tropical waders in the family Burhinidae. They are found worldwide within the tropical zone, with some species also breeding in temperate Europe and Australia. They are medium to large waders with strong black or yellow-black bills, large yellow eyes and cryptic plumage. Despite being classed as waders, most species have a preference for arid or semi-arid habitats.

- Indian thick-knee, Burhinus indicus (A)
- Great thick-knee, Esacus recurvirostris (A)

== Stilts and avocets ==
Order: Charadriiformes Family: Recurvirostridae

Recurvirostridae is a family of large wading birds, which includes the avocets and stilts. The avocets have long legs and long up-curved bills. The stilts have extremely long legs and long, thin, straight bills.

- Black-winged stilt, Himantopus himantopus

== Plovers and lapwings ==
Order: Charadriiformes Family: Charadriidae

The family Charadriidae includes the plovers, dotterels and lapwings. They are small to medium-sized birds with compact bodies, short, thick necks and long, usually pointed, wings. They are found in open country worldwide, mostly in habitats near water.

- Black-bellied plover, Pluvialis squatarola (A)
- Pacific golden-plover, Pluvialis fulva
- Northern lapwing, Vanellus vanellus
- River lapwing, Vanellus duvaucelii (A)
- Gray-headed lapwing, Vanellus cinereus
- Red-wattled lapwing, Vanellus indicus (A)
- Lesser sand-plover, Charadrius mongolus (A)
- Greater sand-plover, Charadrius leschenaultii (A)
- Kentish plover, Charadrius alexandrinus
- White-faced plover, Charadrius dealbatus
- Common ringed plover, Charadrius hiaticula (A)
- Long-billed plover, Charadrius placidus
- Little ringed plover, Charadrius dubius
- Oriental plover, Charadrius veredus (A)

== Painted-snipes ==
Order: Charadriiformes Family: Rostratulidae

Painted-snipes are short-legged, long-billed birds similar in shape to the true snipes, but more brightly coloured.

- Greater painted-snipe, Rostratula benghalensis

== Jacanas ==
Order: Charadriiformes Family: Jacanidae

The jacanas are a group of tropical waders in the family Jacanidae. They are found throughout the tropics. They are identifiable by their huge feet and claws which enable them to walk on floating vegetation in the shallow lakes that are their preferred habitat.

- Pheasant-tailed jacana, Hydrophasianus chirurgus
- Bronze-winged jacana, Metopidius indicus

== Sandpipers and allies ==
Order: Charadriiformes Family: Scolopacidae

Scolopacidae is a large diverse family of small to medium-sized shorebirds including the sandpipers, curlews, godwits, shanks, tattlers, woodcocks, snipes, dowitchers and phalaropes. The majority of these species eat small invertebrates picked out of the mud or soil. Variation in length of legs and bills enables multiple species to feed in the same habitat, particularly on the coast, without direct competition for food.

- Whimbrel, Numenius phaeopus (A)
- Eurasian curlew, Numenius arquata (A)
- Black-tailed godwit, Limosa limosa (A)
- Ruddy turnstone, Arenaria interpres (A)
- Ruff, Calidris pugnax
- Curlew sandpiper, Calidris ferruginea (A)
- Temminck's stint, Calidris temminckii
- Long-toed stint, Calidris subminuta
- Red-necked stint, Calidris ruficollis (A)
- Sanderling, Calidris alba (A)
- Dunlin, Calidris alpina
- Eurasian woodcock, Scolopax rusticola
- Wood snipe, Gallinago nemoricola (A)
- Common snipe, Gallinago gallinago
- Pin-tailed snipe, Gallinago stenura
- Swinhoe's snipe, Gallinago megala (A)
- Terek sandpiper, Xenus cinereus
- Red-necked phalarope, Phalaropus lobatus (A)
- Common sandpiper, Actitis hypoleucos
- Green sandpiper, Tringa ochropus
- Gray-tailed tattler, Tringa brevipes (A)
- Spotted redshank, Tringa erythropus
- Common greenshank, Tringa nebularia
- Nordmann's greenshank, Tringa guttifer
- Marsh sandpiper, Tringa stagnatilis (A)
- Wood sandpiper, Tringa glareola
- Common redshank, Tringa totanus

== Buttonquail ==
Order: Charadriiformes Family: Turnicidae

The buttonquail are small, drab, running birds which resemble the true quails. The female is the brighter of the sexes and initiates courtship. The male incubates the eggs and tends the young.

- Small buttonquail, Turnix sylvatica
- Yellow-legged buttonquail, Turnix tanki
- Barred buttonquail, Turnix suscitator

== Pratincoles and coursers ==
Order: Charadriiformes Family: Glareolidae

Glareolidae is a family of wading birds comprising the pratincoles, which have short legs, long pointed wings and long forked tails, and the coursers, which have long legs, short wings and long, pointed bills which curve downwards.

- Oriental pratincole, Glareola maldivarum
- Small pratincole, Glareola lactea

== Gulls, terns, and skimmers ==
Order: Charadriiformes Family: Laridae

Laridae is a family of medium to large seabirds, the gulls, terns, and skimmers. Gulls are typically grey or white, often with black markings on the head or wings. They have stout, longish bills and webbed feet. Terns are a group of generally medium to large seabirds typically with grey or white plumage, often with black markings on the head. Most terns hunt fish by diving but some pick insects off the surface of fresh water. Terns are generally long-lived birds, with several species known to live in excess of 30 years. Skimmers are a small family of tropical tern-like birds. They have an elongated lower mandible which they use to feed by flying low over the water surface and skimming the water for small fish.

- Black-headed gull, Chroicocephalus ridibundus (A)
- Brown-headed gull, Chroicocephalus brunnicephalus
- Pallas's gull, Ichthyaetus ichthyaetus
- Herring gull, Larus argentatus (A)
- Lesser black-backed gull, Larus fuscus (A)
- Little tern, Sternula albifrons
- White-winged tern, Chlidonias leucopterus
- Whiskered tern, Chlidonias hybrida (A)
- Black-bellied tern, Sterna acuticauda (Ex)
- River tern, Sterna aurantia (A)
- Great crested tern, Thalasseus bergii
- Indian skimmer, Rynchops albicollis

== Storks ==
Order: Ciconiiformes Family: Ciconiidae

Storks are large, long-legged, long-necked, wading birds with long, stout bills. Storks are mute, but bill-clattering is an important mode of communication at the nest. Their nests can be large and may be reused for many years. Many species are migratory.

- Asian openbill, Anastomus oscitans
- Black stork, Ciconia nigra
- Asian woolly-necked stork, Ciconia episcopus
- Black-necked stork, Ephippiorhynchus asiaticus
- Lesser adjutant, Leptoptilos javanicus
- Greater adjutant, Leptoptilos dubius
- Painted stork, Mycteria leucocephala

== Frigatebirds ==
Order: Suliformes Family: Fregatidae

Frigatebirds are large seabirds usually found over tropical oceans. They are large, black-and-white or completely black, with long wings and deeply forked tails. The males have colored inflatable throat pouches. They do not swim or walk and cannot take off from a flat surface. Having the largest wingspan-to-body-weight ratio of any bird, they are essentially aerial, able to stay aloft for more than a week.

- Lesser frigatebird, Fregata ariel (A)

== Anhingas ==
Order: Suliformes Family: Anhingidae

Anhingas or darters are often called "snake-birds" because of their long thin neck, which gives a snake-like appearance when they swim with their bodies submerged. The males have black and dark-brown plumage, an erectile crest on the nape and a larger bill than the female. The females have much paler plumage especially on the neck and underparts. The darters have completely webbed feet and their legs are short and set far back on the body. Their plumage is somewhat permeable, like that of cormorants, and they spread their wings to dry after diving.

- Oriental darter, Anhinga melanogaster (A)

== Cormorants and shags ==
Order: Suliformes Family: Phalacrocoracidae

Phalacrocoracidae is a family of medium to large coastal, fish-eating seabirds which includes cormorants and shags. Plumage colouration varies, with the majority having mainly dark plumage, some species being black-and-white and a few being colourful.

- Little cormorant, Microcarbo niger
- Great cormorant, Phalacrocorax carbo (A)
- Indian cormorant, Phalacrocorax fuscicollis

== Pelicans ==
Order: Pelecaniformes Family: Pelecanidae

Pelicans are large water birds with a distinctive pouch under their beak. As with other members of the order Pelecaniformes, they have webbed feet with four toes.

- Spot-billed pelican, Pelecanus philippensis

== Herons, egrets, and bitterns ==
Order: Pelecaniformes Family: Ardeidae

The family Ardeidae contains the bitterns, herons, and egrets. Herons and egrets are medium to large wading birds with long necks and legs. Bitterns tend to be shorter necked and more wary. Members of Ardeidae fly with their necks retracted, unlike other long-necked birds such as storks, ibises and spoonbills.

- Great bittern, Botaurus stellaris (A)
- Yellow bittern, Ixobrychus sinensis
- Schrenck's bittern, Ixobrychus eurhythmus
- Cinnamon bittern, Ixobrychus cinnamomeus
- Black bittern, Ixobrychus flavicollis
- Gray heron, Ardea cinerea
- Purple heron, Ardea purpurea
- Great egret, Ardea alba
- Intermediate egret, Ardea intermedia
- Little egret, Egretta garzetta
- Eastern cattle egret, Ardea coromanda
- Chinese pond-heron, Ardeola bacchus
- Javan pond-heron, Ardeola speciosa (A)
- Striated heron, Butorides striata
- Black-crowned night-heron, Nycticorax nycticorax
- Malayan night-heron, Gorsachius melanolophus

== Ibises and spoonbills ==
Order: Pelecaniformes Family: Threskiornithidae

Threskiornithidae is a family of large terrestrial and wading birds which includes the ibises and spoonbills. They have long, broad wings with 11 primary and about 20 secondary feathers. They are strong fliers and despite their size and weight, very capable soarers.

- Glossy ibis, Plegadis falcinellus (A)
- Black-headed ibis, Threskiornis melanocephalus
- White-shouldered ibis, Pseudibis davisoni
- Giant ibis, Pseudibis gigantea

== Osprey ==
Order: Accipitriformes Family: Pandionidae

The family Pandionidae contains only one species, the osprey. The osprey is a medium-large raptor which is a specialist fish-eater with a worldwide distribution.

- Osprey, Pandion haliaetus

== Hawks, eagles, and kites ==
Order: Accipitriformes Family: Accipitridae

Accipitridae is a family of birds of prey, which includes hawks, eagles, kites, harriers and Old World vultures. These birds have powerful hooked beaks for tearing flesh from their prey, strong legs, powerful talons and keen eyesight.

- Black-winged kite, Elanus caeruleus
- Oriental honey-buzzard, Pernis ptilorhynchus
- Jerdon's baza, Aviceda jerdoni
- Black baza, Aviceda leuphotes
- Red-headed vulture, Sarcogyps calvus
- Cinereous vulture, Aegypius monachus (A)
- White-rumped vulture, Gyps bengalensis (possibly extirpated)
- Slender-billed vulture, Gyps tenuirostris
- Crested serpent-eagle, Spilornis cheela
- Short-toed snake-eagle, Circaetus gallicus (A)
- Changeable hawk-eagle, Nisaetus cirrhatus
- Mountain hawk-eagle, Nisaetus nipalensis
- Rufous-bellied eagle, Lophotriorchis kienerii
- Black eagle, Ictinaetus malaiensis
- Greater spotted eagle, Clanga clanga
- Booted eagle, Hieraaetus pennatus (A)
- Imperial eagle, Aquila heliaca
- Bonelli's eagle, Aquila fasciata
- Rufous-winged buzzard, Butastur liventer
- Gray-faced buzzard, Butastur indicus
- Eurasian marsh-harrier, Circus aeruginosus (A)
- Eastern marsh-harrier, Circus spilonotus
- Hen harrier, Circus cyaneus (A)
- Pied harrier, Circus melanoleucos
- Crested goshawk, Accipiter trivirgatus
- Shikra, Accipiter badius
- Chinese sparrowhawk, Accipiter soloensis
- Japanese sparrowhawk, Accipiter gularis
- Besra, Accipiter virgatus
- Eurasian sparrowhawk, Accipiter nisus
- Black kite, Milvus migrans
- Brahminy kite, Haliastur indus (A)
- White-bellied sea-eagle, Haliaeetus leucogaster
- Lesser fish-eagle, Haliaeetus humilis
- Gray-headed fish-eagle, Haliaeetus ichthyaetus
- Common buzzard, Buteo buteo
- Eastern buzzard, Buteo japonicus

== Barn-owls ==
Order: Strigiformes Family: Tytonidae

Barn-owls are medium to large owls with large heads and characteristic heart-shaped faces. They have long strong legs with powerful talons.

- Eastern barn owl, Tyto javanica
- Oriental bay-owl, Phodilus badius

== Owls ==
Order: Strigiformes Family: Strigidae

The typical owls are small to large solitary nocturnal birds of prey. They have large forward-facing eyes and ears, a hawk-like beak and a conspicuous circle of feathers around each eye called a facial disk.

- Mountain scops-owl, Otus spilocephalus
- Collared scops-owl, Otus lettia
- Oriental scops-owl, Otus sunia
- Spot-bellied eagle-owl, Bubo nipalensis
- Brown fish-owl, Ketupa zeylonensis
- Tawny fish-owl, Ketupa flavipes
- Buffy fish-owl, Ketupa ketupu
- Asian barred owlet, Glaucidium cuculoides
- Collared owlet, Taenioptynx brodiei
- Spotted owlet, Athene brama
- Spotted wood-owl, Strix seloputo (A)
- Brown wood-owl, Strix leptogrammica
- Himalayan owl, Strix nivicolum
- Long-eared owl, Asio otus
- Short-eared owl, Asio flammeus
- Brown boobook, Ninox scutulata

== Trogons ==
Order: Trogoniformes Family: Trogonidae

The family Trogonidae includes trogons and quetzals. Found in tropical woodlands worldwide, they feed on insects and fruit, and their broad bills and weak legs reflect their diet and arboreal habits. Although their flight is fast, they are reluctant to fly any distance. Trogons have soft, often colourful, feathers with distinctive male and female plumage.

- Red-headed trogon, Harpactes erythrocephalus
- Orange-breasted trogon, Harpactes oreskios

== Hoopoes ==
Order: Bucerotiformes Family: Upupidae

Hoopoes have black, white and orangey-pink colouring with a large erectile crest on their head.

- Eurasian hoopoe, Upupa epops

== Hornbills ==
Order: Bucerotiformes Family: Bucerotidae

Hornbills are a group of birds whose bill is shaped like a cow's horn, but without a twist, sometimes with a casque on the upper mandible. Frequently, the bill is brightly coloured.

- Great hornbill, Buceros bicornis
- Brown hornbill, Anorrhinus austeni
- Oriental pied-hornbill, Anthracoceros albirostris
- Rufous-necked hornbill, Aceros nipalensis
- Wreathed hornbill, Rhyticeros undulatus

== Kingfishers ==
Order: Coraciiformes Family: Alcedinidae

Kingfishers are medium-sized birds with large heads, long, pointed bills, short legs and stubby tails.

- Blyth's kingfisher, Alcedo hercules
- Common kingfisher, Alcedo atthis
- Blue-eared kingfisher, Alcedo meninting
- Black-backed dwarf-kingfisher, Ceyx erithacus
- Banded kingfisher, Lacedo pulchella
- Stork-billed kingfisher, Pelargopsis capensis
- Ruddy kingfisher, Halcyon coromanda
- White-throated kingfisher, Halcyon smyrnensis
- Black-capped kingfisher, Halcyon pileata
- Collared kingfisher, Todirhamphus chloris
- Crested kingfisher, Megaceryle lugubris
- Pied kingfisher, Ceryle rudis

== Bee-eaters ==
Order: Coraciiformes Family: Meropidae

The bee-eaters are a group of near passerine birds in the family Meropidae. Most species are found in Africa but others occur in southern Europe, Madagascar, Australia and New Guinea. They are characterised by richly coloured plumage, slender bodies and usually elongated central tail feathers. All are colourful and have long downturned bills and pointed wings, which give them a swallow-like appearance when seen from afar.

- Blue-bearded bee-eater, Nyctyornis athertoni
- Asian green bee-eater, Merops orientalis
- Blue-throated bee-eater, Merops viridis
- Blue-tailed bee-eater, Merops philippinus
- Chestnut-headed bee-eater, Merops leschenaulti

== Rollers ==
Order: Coraciiformes Family: Coraciidae

Rollers resemble crows in size and build, but are more closely related to the kingfishers and bee-eaters. They share the colourful appearance of those groups with blues and browns predominating. The two inner front toes are connected, but the outer toe is not.

- Indochinese roller, Coracias affinis
- Dollarbird, Eurystomus orientalis

== Asian barbets ==
Order: Piciformes Family: Megalaimidae

The Asian barbets are plump birds, with short necks and large heads. They get their name from the bristles which fringe their heavy bills. Most species are brightly coloured.

- Coppersmith barbet, Psilopogon haemacephalus
- Blue-eared barbet, Psilopogon duvaucelii
- Great barbet, Psilopogon virens
- Red-vented barbet, Psilopogon lagrandieri
- Green-eared barbet, Psilopogon faiostrictus
- Lineated barbet, Psilopogon lineatus
- Golden-throated barbet, Psilopogon franklinii
- Necklaced barbet, Psilopogon auricularis
- Moustached barbet, Psilopogon incognitus
- Blue-throated barbet, Psilopogon asiaticus
- Indochinese barbet, Psilopogon annamensis

== Woodpeckers ==
Order: Piciformes Family: Picidae

Woodpeckers are small to medium-sized birds with chisel-like beaks, short legs, stiff tails and long tongues used for capturing insects. Some species have feet with two toes pointing forward and two backward, while several species have only three toes. Many woodpeckers have the habit of tapping noisily on tree trunks with their beaks.

- Eurasian wryneck, Jynx torquilla (A)
- Speckled piculet, Picumnus innominatus
- White-browed piculet, Sasia ochracea
- Heart-spotted woodpecker, Hemicircus canente
- Gray-capped pygmy woodpecker, Yungipicus canicapillus
- Yellow-crowned woodpecker, Leiopicus mahrattensis
- Freckle-breasted woodpecker, Dendrocopos analis
- Stripe-breasted woodpecker, Dendrocopos atratus
- Great spotted woodpecker, Dendrocopos major
- Crimson-breasted woodpecker, Dryobates cathpharius
- Bay woodpecker, Blythipicus pyrrhotis
- Greater flameback, Chrysocolaptes guttacristatus
- Rufous woodpecker, Micropternus brachyurus
- Black-and-buff woodpecker, Meiglyptes jugularis
- Pale-headed woodpecker, Gecinulus grantia
- Bamboo woodpecker, Gecinulus viridis
- Common flameback, Dinopium javanense
- Lesser yellownape, Picus chlorolophus
- Streak-throated woodpecker, Picus xanthopygaeus
- Red-collared woodpecker, Picus rabieri
- Laced woodpecker, Picus vittatus
- Gray-headed woodpecker, Picus canus
- Black-headed woodpecker, Picus erythropygius
- Greater yellownape, Chrysophlegma flavinucha
- Great slaty woodpecker, Mulleripicus pulverulentus
- White-bellied woodpecker, Dryocopus javensis

== Falcons and caracaras ==
Order: Falconiformes Family: Falconidae

Falconidae is a family of diurnal birds of prey. They differ from hawks, eagles and kites in that they kill with their beaks instead of their talons. T

- White-rumped falcon, Polihierax insignis
- Collared falconet, Microhierax caerulescens
- Pied falconet, Microhierax melanoleucus
- Lesser kestrel, Falco naumanni (extirpated)
- Eurasian kestrel, Falco tinnunculus
- Amur falcon, Falco amurensis
- Merlin, Falco columbarius
- Eurasian hobby, Falco subbuteo
- Oriental hobby, Falco severus
- Peregrine falcon, Falco peregrinus

== Old World parrots ==
Order: Psittaciformes Family: Psittaculidae

Parrots are small to large birds with a characteristic curved beak. Their upper mandibles have slight mobility in the joint with the skull and they have a generally erect stance. All parrots are zygodactyl, having the four toes on each foot placed two at the front and two to the back.

- Alexandrine parakeet, Psittacula eupatria
- Gray-headed parakeet, Psittacula finschii
- Blossom-headed parakeet, Psittacula roseata
- Red-breasted parakeet, Psittacula alexandri
- Vernal hanging-parrot, Loriculus vernalis

== Asian and Grauer's broadbills ==
Order: Passeriformes Family: Eurylaimidae

The broadbills are small, brightly coloured birds, which feed on fruit and also take insects in flycatcher fashion, snapping their broad bills. Their habitat is canopies of wet forests.

- Black-and-red broadbill, Cymbirhynchus macrorhynchos
- Long-tailed broadbill, Psarisomus dalhousiae
- Silver-breasted broadbill, Serilophus lunatus
- Banded broadbill, Eurylaimus javanicus
- Dusky broadbill, Corydon sumatranus

== Pittas ==
Order: Passeriformes Family: Pittidae

Pittas are medium-sized by passerine standards and are stocky, with fairly long, strong legs, short tails and stout bills. Many are brightly coloured. They spend the majority of their time on wet forest floors, eating snails, insects and similar invertebrates.

- Eared pitta, Hydrornis phayrei
- Rusty-naped pitta, Hydrornis oatesi
- Blue-naped pitta, Hydrornis nipalensis
- Blue-rumped pitta, Hydrornis soror
- Blue pitta, Hydrornis cyanea
- Bar-bellied pitta, Hydrornis elliotii
- Blue-winged pitta, Pitta moluccensis
- Fairy pitta, Pitta nympha
- Hooded pitta, Pitta sordida

== Cuckooshrikes ==
Order: Passeriformes Family: Campephagidae

The cuckooshrikes are small to medium-sized passerine birds. They are predominantly greyish with white and black, although some species are brightly coloured.

- Small minivet, Pericrocotus cinnamomeus
- Gray-chinned minivet, Pericrocotus solaris
- Short-billed minivet, Pericrocotus brevirostris
- Long-tailed minivet, Pericrocotus ethologus
- Scarlet minivet, Pericrocotus flammeus
- Ashy minivet, Pericrocotus divaricatus
- Brown-rumped minivet, Pericrocotus cantonensis
- Rosy minivet, Pericrocotus roseus
- Large cuckooshrike, Coracina macei
- Black-winged cuckooshrike, Lalage melaschistos
- Indochinese cuckooshrike, Lalage polioptera

== Vireos, shrike-babblers, and erpornis ==
Order: Passeriformes Family: Vireonidae

Most of the members of this family are found in the New World. However, the shrike-babblers and erpornis, which only slightly resemble the "true" vireos and greenlets, are found in South East Asia.

- White-browed shrike-babbler, Pteruthius aeralatus
- Black-eared shrike-babbler, Pteruthius melanotis
- Clicking shrike-babbler, Pteruthius intermedius
- White-bellied erpornis, Erpornis zantholeuca

== Whistlers and allies ==
Order: Passeriformes Family: Pachycephalidae

The family Pachycephalidae includes the whistlers, shrikethrushes, and some of the pitohuis.

- Mangrove whistler, Pachycephala cinerea

== Old World orioles ==
Order: Passeriformes Family: Oriolidae

The Old World orioles are colourful passerine birds. They are not related to the New World orioles.

- Black-naped oriole, Oriolus chinensis
- Slender-billed oriole, Oriolus tenuirostris
- Black-hooded oriole, Oriolus xanthornus
- Maroon oriole, Oriolus traillii

== Woodswallows, bellmagpies, and allies ==
Order: Passeriformes Family: Artamidae

The woodswallows are soft-plumaged, somber-coloured passerine birds. They are smooth, agile flyers with moderately large, semi-triangular wings.

- Ashy woodswallow, Artamus fuscus

== Vangas, helmetshrikes, and allies ==
Order: Passeriformes Family: Vangidae

The family Vangidae is highly variable, though most members of it resemble true shrikes to some degree.

- Large woodshrike, Tephrodornis gularis
- Common woodshrike, Tephrodornis pondicerianus
- Bar-winged flycatcher-shrike, Hemipus picatus

== Ioras ==
Order: Passeriformes Family: Aegithinidae

The ioras are bulbul-like birds of open forest or thorn scrub, but whereas that group tends to be drab in colouration, ioras are sexually dimorphic, with the males being brightly plumaged in yellows and greens.

- Common iora, Aegithina tiphia
- Great iora, Aegithina lafresnayei

== Fantails ==
Order: Passeriformes Family: Rhipiduridae

The fantails are small insectivorous birds which are specialist aerial feeders.

- Malaysian pied-fantail, Rhipidura javanica
- White-throated fantail, Rhipidura albicollis
- White-browed fantail, Rhipidura aureola

== Drongos ==
Order: Passeriformes Family: Dicruridae

The drongos are mostly black or dark grey in colour, sometimes with metallic tints. They have long forked tails, and some Asian species have elaborate tail decorations. They have short legs and sit very upright when perched, like a shrike. They flycatch or take prey from the ground.

- Black drongo, Dicrurus macrocercus
- Ashy drongo, Dicrurus leucophaeus
- Crow-billed drongo, Dicrurus annectens
- Bronzed drongo, Dicrurus aeneus
- Lesser racket-tailed drongo, Dicrurus remifer
- Hair-crested drongo, Dicrurus hottentottus
- Greater racket-tailed drongo, Dicrurus paradiseus

== Monarch flycatchers ==
Order: Passeriformes Family: Monarchidae

The monarch flycatchers are small to medium-sized insectivorous passerines which hunt by flycatching.

- Black-naped monarch, Hypothymis azurea
- Japanese paradise-flycatcher, Terpsiphone atrocaudata
- Amur paradise-flycatcher, Terpsiphone incei
- Blyth's paradise-flycatcher, Terpsiphone affinis

== Shrikes ==
Order: Passeriformes Family: Laniidae

Shrikes are passerine birds known for their habit of catching other birds and small animals and impaling the uneaten portions of their bodies on thorns. A typical shrike's beak is hooked, like a bird of prey.

- Tiger shrike, Lanius tigrinus
- Brown shrike, Lanius cristatus
- Burmese shrike, Lanius collurioides
- Long-tailed shrike, Lanius schach
- Gray-backed shrike, Lanius tephronotus

== Crows, jays, and magpies ==
Order: Passeriformes Family: Corvidae

The family Corvidae includes crows, ravens, jays, choughs, magpies, treepies, nutcrackers and ground jays. Corvids are above average in size among the Passeriformes, and some of the larger species show high levels of intelligence.

- Eurasian jay, Garrulus glandarius
- Red-billed blue-magpie, Urocissa erythrorhyncha
- White-winged magpie, Urocissa whiteheadi
- Common green-magpie, Cissa chinensis
- Indochinese green-magpie, Cissa hypoleuca
- Rufous treepie, Dendrocitta vagabunda
- Gray treepie, Dendrocitta formosae
- Racket-tailed treepie, Crypsirina temia
- Ratchet-tailed treepie, Temnurus temnurus (A)
- Oriental magpie, Pica serica
- Large-billed crow, Corvus macrorhynchos

== Fairy flycatchers ==
Order: Passeriformes Family: Stenostiridae

Most of the species of this small family are found in Africa, though a few inhabit tropical Asia. They are not closely related to other birds called "flycatchers".

- Yellow-bellied fairy-fantail, Chelidorhynx hypoxanthus
- Gray-headed canary-flycatcher, Culicicapa ceylonensis

== Tits, chickadees, and titmice ==
Order: Passeriformes Family: Paridae

The Paridae are mainly small stocky woodland species with short stout bills. Some have crests. They are adaptable birds, with a mixed diet including seeds and insects.

- Fire-capped tit, Cephalopyrus flammiceps (A)
- Yellow-browed tit, Sylviparus modestus
- Sultan tit, Melanochlora sultanea
- Green-backed tit, Parus monticolus
- Cinereous tit, Parus cinereus (A)
- Japanese tit, Parus minor (A)
- Yellow-cheeked tit, Machlolophus spilonotus

== Larks ==
Order: Passeriformes Family: Alaudidae

Larks are small terrestrial birds with often extravagant songs and display flights. Most larks are fairly dull in appearance. Their food is insects and seeds.

- Horsfield's bushlark, Mirafra javanica
- Indochinese bushlark, Mirafra erythrocephala
- Oriental skylark, Alauda gulgula (A)

== Cisticolas and allies ==
Order: Passeriformes Family: Cisticolidae

The Cisticolidae are warblers found mainly in warmer southern regions of the Old World. They are generally very small birds of drab brown or grey appearance found in open country such as grassland or scrub.

- Common tailorbird, Orthotomus sutorius
- Dark-necked tailorbird, Orthotomus atrogularis
- Striped prinia, Prinia striata (A)
- Annam prinia, Prinia rocki
- Brown prinia, Prinia polychroa
- Hill prinia, Prinia superciliaris
- Rufescent prinia, Prinia rufescens
- Gray-breasted prinia, Prinia hodgsonii
- Yellow-bellied prinia, Prinia flaviventris
- Plain prinia, Prinia inornata
- Zitting cisticola, Cisticola juncidis
- Golden-headed cisticola, Cisticola exilis

== Reed warblers and allies ==
Order: Passeriformes Family: Acrocephalidae

The members of this family are usually rather large for "warblers". Most are rather plain olivaceous brown above with much yellow to beige below. They are usually found in open woodland, reedbeds, or tall grass. The family occurs mostly in southern to western Eurasia and surroundings, but it also ranges far into the Pacific, with some species in Africa.

- Thick-billed warbler, Arundinax aedon
- Booted warbler, Iduna caligata (A)
- Black-browed reed warbler, Acrocephalus bistrigiceps
- Blunt-winged warbler, Acrocephalus concinens
- Manchurian reed warbler, Acrocephalus tangorum
- Oriental reed warbler, Acrocephalus orientalis
- Clamorous reed warbler, Acrocephalus stentoreus

== Grassbirds and allies ==
Order: Passeriformes Family: Locustellidae

Locustellidae are a family of small insectivorous songbirds found mainly in Eurasia, Africa, and the Australian region. They are smallish birds with tails that are usually long and pointed, and tend to be drab brownish or buffy all over.

- Striated grassbird, Megalurus palustris
- Pallas's grasshopper warbler, Helopsaltes certhiola
- Lanceolated warbler, Locustella lanceolata
- Chinese bush warbler, Locustella tacsanowskia
- Baikal bush warbler, Locustella davidi
- Spotted bush warbler, Locustella thoracica (A)
- Russet bush warbler, Locustella mandelli

== Cupwings ==
Order: Passeriformes Family: Pnoepygidae

The members of this small family are found in mountainous parts of South and South East Asia.

- Pygmy cupwing, Pnoepyga pusilla

== Swallows ==
Order: Passeriformes Family: Hirundinidae

The family Hirundinidae is adapted to aerial feeding. They have a slender streamlined body, long pointed wings and a short bill with a wide gape. The feet are adapted to perching rather than walking, and the front toes are partially joined at the base.

- Gray-throated martin, Riparia chinensis
- Bank swallow, Riparia riparia (A)
- Dusky crag-martin, Ptyonoprogne concolor
- Barn swallow, Hirundo rustica
- Wire-tailed swallow, Hirundo smithii
- Pacific swallow, Hirundo tahitica (A)
- Red-rumped swallow, Cecropis daurica
- Striated swallow, Cecropis striolata
- Rufous-bellied swallow, Cecropis badia
- Common house-martin, Delichon urbicum (A)
- Asian house-martin, Delichon dasypus
- Nepal house-martin, Delichon nipalense

== Bulbuls ==
Order: Passeriformes Family: Pycnonotidae

Bulbuls are medium-sized songbirds. Some are colourful with yellow, red or orange vents, cheeks, throats or supercilia, but most are drab, with uniform olive-brown to black plumage. Some species have distinct crests.

- Black-headed bulbul, Brachypodius melanocephalos
- Black-crested bulbul, Rubigula flaviventris
- Bare-faced bulbul, Nok hualon (E)
- Crested finchbill, Spizixos canifrons
- Striated bulbul, Pycnonotus striatus
- Red-whiskered bulbul, Pycnonotus jocosus
- Brown-breasted bulbul, Pycnonotus xanthorrhous
- Light-vented bulbul, Pycnonotus sinensis (A)
- Sooty-headed bulbul, Pycnonotus aurigaster
- Stripe-throated bulbul, Pycnonotus finlaysoni
- Flavescent bulbul, Pycnonotus flavescens
- Yellow-vented bulbul, Pycnonotus goiavier
- Streak-eared bulbul, Pycnonotus conradi
- Puff-throated bulbul, Alophoixus pallidus
- Gray-eyed bulbul, Iole propinqua
- Black bulbul, Hypsipetes leucocephalus
- White-headed bulbul, Hypsipetes thompsoni (A)
- Ashy bulbul, Hemixos flavala
- Chestnut bulbul, Hemixos castanonotus (A)
- Mountain bulbul, Ixos mcclellandii

== Leaf warblers ==
Order: Passeriformes Family: Phylloscopidae

Leaf warblers are a family of small insectivorous birds found mostly in Eurasia and ranging into Wallacea and Africa. The species are of various sizes, often green-plumaged above and yellow below, or more subdued with greyish-green to greyish-brown colours.

- Wood warbler, Phylloscopus sibilatrix (A)
- Ashy-throated warbler, Phylloscopus maculipennis
- Buff-barred warbler, Phylloscopus pulcher
- Yellow-browed warbler, Phylloscopus inornatus
- Hume's warbler, Phylloscopus humei
- Chinese leaf warbler, Phylloscopus yunnanensis
- Pallas's leaf warbler, Phylloscopus proregulus
- Gansu leaf warbler, Phylloscopus kansuensis (A)
- Radde's warbler, Phylloscopus schwarzi
- Yellow-streaked warbler, Phylloscopus armandii
- Dusky warbler, Phylloscopus fuscatus
- Buff-throated warbler, Phylloscopus subaffinis
- Eastern crowned warbler, Phylloscopus coronatus
- White-spectacled warbler, Phylloscopus intermedius
- Gray-cheeked warbler, Phylloscopus poliogenys
- Gray-crowned warbler, Phylloscopus tephrocephalus
- Bianchi's warbler, Phylloscopus valentini
- Martens's warbler, Phylloscopus omeiensis
- Alström's warbler, Phylloscopus soror (A)
- Greenish warbler, Phylloscopus trochiloides
- Two-barred warbler, Phylloscopus plumbeitarsus
- Pale-legged leaf warbler, Phylloscopus tenellipes
- Sakhalin leaf warbler, Phylloscopus borealoides (A)
- Arctic warbler, Phylloscopus borealis
- Chestnut-crowned warbler, Phylloscopus castaniceps
- Limestone leaf warbler, Phylloscopus calciatilis
- Yellow-vented warbler, Phylloscopus cantator
- Sulphur-breasted warbler, Phylloscopus ricketti
- Blyth's leaf warbler, Phylloscopus reguloides
- Claudia's leaf warbler, Phylloscopus claudiae
- Davison's leaf warbler, Phylloscopus intensior
- Kloss's leaf warbler, Phylloscopus ogilviegranti (A)

== Bush warblers and allies ==
Order: Passeriformes Family: Scotocercidae

The members of this family are found throughout Africa, Asia, and Polynesia. Their taxonomy is in flux, and some authorities place some genera in other families.

- Pale-footed bush warbler, Urosphena pallidipes
- Asian stubtail, Urosphena squameiceps
- Gray-bellied tesia, Tesia cyaniventer
- Slaty-bellied tesia, Tesia olivea
- Chestnut-headed tesia, Cettia castaneocoronata
- Yellow-bellied warbler, Abroscopus superciliaris
- Rufous-faced warbler, Abroscopus albogularis
- Black-faced warbler, Abroscopus schisticeps (A)
- Mountain tailorbird, Phyllergates cuculatus
- Manchurian bush warbler, Horornis borealis
- Brownish-flanked bush warbler, Horornis fortipes
- Aberrant bush warbler, Horornis flavolivaceus

== Long-tailed tits ==
Order: Passeriformes Family: Aegithalidae

Long-tailed tits are a group of small passerine birds with medium to long tails. They make woven bag nests in trees. Most eat a mixed diet which includes insects.

- Black-throated tit, Aegithalos concinnus

== Sylviid warblers, parrotbills, and allies ==
Order: Passeriformes Family: Sylviidae

The family Sylviidae is a group of small insectivorous passerine birds. They mainly occur as breeding species, as the common name implies, in Europe, Asia and, to a lesser extent, Africa. Most are of generally undistinguished appearance, but many have distinctive songs.

- Yellow-eyed babbler, Chrysomma sinense (A)
- Indochinese fulvetta, Fulvetta danisi
- Streak-throated fulvetta, Fulvetta manipurensis
- Gray-headed parrotbill, Psittiparus gularis
- Rufous-headed parrotbill, Psittiparus bakeri
- Spot-breasted parrotbill, Paradoxornis guttaticollis
- Pale-billed parrotbill, Chleuasicus atrosuperciliaris
- Black-throated parrotbill, Suthora nipalensis
- Golden parrotbill, Suthora verreauxi
- Short-tailed parrotbill, Neosuthora davidianus

== White-eyes, yuhinas, and allies ==
Order: Passeriformes Family: Zosteropidae

The white-eyes are small and mostly undistinguished, their plumage above being generally some dull colour like greenish-olive, but some species have a white or bright yellow throat, breast or lower parts, and several have buff flanks. As their name suggests, many species have a white ring around each eye.

- Indochinese yuhina, Staphida torqueola
- Whiskered yuhina, Yuhina flavicollis
- Stripe-throated yuhina, Yuhina gularis
- Black-chinned yuhina, Yuhina nigrimenta
- Chestnut-flanked white-eye, Zosterops erythropleurus
- Indian white-eye, Zosterops palpebrosus
- Swinhoe's white-eye, Zosterops simplex

== Tree-babblers, scimitar-babblers, and allies ==
Order: Passeriformes Family: Timaliidae

The babblers, or timaliids, are somewhat diverse in size and colouration, but are characterised by soft fluffy plumage.

- Chestnut-capped babbler, Timalia pileata
- Pin-striped tit-babbler, Mixornis gularis
- Gray-faced tit-babbler, Mixornis kelleyi
- Golden babbler, Cyanoderma chrysaeum
- Rufous-capped babbler, Cyanoderma ruficeps
- Buff-chested babbler, Cyanoderma ambigua
- Rufous-fronted babbler, Cyanoderma rufifrons
- Red-billed scimitar-babbler, Pomatorhinus ochraceiceps
- Coral-billed scimitar-babbler, Pomatorhinus ferruginosus
- Slender-billed scimitar-babbler, Pomatorhinus superciliaris
- Streak-breasted scimitar-babbler, Pomatorhinus ruficollis
- White-browed scimitar-babbler, Pomatorhinus schisticeps
- Large scimitar-babbler, Erythrogenys hypoleucos
- Black-streaked scimitar-babbler, Erythrogenys gravivox
- Gray-throated babbler, Stachyris nigriceps
- Spot-necked babbler, Stachyris striolata
- Sooty babbler, Stachyris herberti

== Ground babblers and allies ==
Order: Passeriformes Family: Pellorneidae

These small to medium-sized songbirds have soft fluffy plumage but are otherwise rather diverse. Members of the genus Illadopsis are found in forests, but some other genera are birds of scrublands.

- Scaly-crowned babbler, Malacopteron cinereum
- Collared babbler, Gampsorhynchus torquatus
- Yellow-throated fulvetta, Schoeniparus cinereus
- Rufous-winged fulvetta, Schoeniparus castaneceps
- Rufous-throated fulvetta, Schoeniparus rufogularis
- Rusty-capped fulvetta, Schoeniparus dubius
- Puff-throated babbler, Pellorneum ruficeps
- Spot-throated babbler, Pellorneum albiventre
- Buff-breasted babbler, Pellorneum tickelli
- Eyebrowed wren-babbler, Napothera epilepidota
- Short-tailed scimitar-babbler, Napothera danjoui
- Abbott's babbler, Malacocincla abbotti
- Annam limestone babbler, Gypsophila annamensis
- Streaked wren-babbler, Gypsophila brevicaudatus

== Laughingthrushes and allies ==
Order: Passeriformes Family: Leiothrichidae

The members of this family are diverse in size and colouration, though those of genus Turdoides tend to be brown or greyish. The family is found in Africa, India, and southeast Asia.

- Brown-cheeked fulvetta, Alcippe poioicephala
- Yunnan fulvetta, Alcippe fratercula
- Mountain fulvetta, Alcippe peracensis
- Black-browed fulvetta, Alcippe grotei
- Himalayan cutia, Cutia nipalensis
- Vietnamese cutia, Cutia legalleni
- White-crested laughingthrush, Garrulax leucolophus
- Lesser necklaced laughingthrush, Garrulax monileger
- White-necked laughingthrush, Garrulax strepitans
- Black-hooded laughingthrush, Garrulax milleti
- Rufous-cheeked laughingthrush, Garrulax castanotis
- Spot-breasted laughingthrush, Garrulax merulinus
- Chinese hwamei, Garrulax canorus (A)
- Chestnut-eared laughingthrush, Ianthocincla konkakinhensis
- Greater necklaced laughingthrush, Pterorhinus pectoralis
- Black-throated laughingthrush, Pterorhinus chinensis
- White-cheeked laughingthrush, Pterorhinus vassali
- Rufous-vented laughingthrush, Pterorhinus gularis
- White-browed laughingthrush, Pterorhinus sannio
- Silver-eared laughingthrush, Trochalopteron melanostigma
- Red-tailed laughingthrush, Trochalopteron milnei
- Black-backed sibia, Heterophasia melanoleuca
- Black-headed sibia, Heterophasia desgodinsi
- Long-tailed sibia, Heterophasia picaoides
- Silver-eared mesia, Leiothrix argentauris
- Red-tailed minla, Minla ignotincta
- Rufous-backed sibia, Leioptila annectens
- Scarlet-faced liocichla, Liocichla ripponi
- Black-crowned barwing, Actinodura sodangorum
- Spectacled barwing, Actinodura ramsayi
- Blue-winged minla, Actinodura cyanouroptera
- Chestnut-tailed minla, Actinodura strigula

== Nuthatches ==
Order: Passeriformes Family: Sittidae

Nuthatches are small woodland birds. They have the unusual ability to climb down trees head first, unlike other birds which can only go upwards. Nuthatches have big heads, short tails and powerful bills and feet.

- Chestnut-bellied nuthatch, Sitta castanea
- Burmese nuthatch, Sitta neglecta
- Chestnut-vented nuthatch, Sitta nagaensis
- White-tailed nuthatch, Sitta himalayensis
- Velvet-fronted nuthatch, Sitta frontalis
- Yellow-billed nuthatch, Sitta solangiae
- Beautiful nuthatch, Sitta formosa

== Treecreepers ==
Order: Passeriformes Family: Certhiidae

Treecreepers are small woodland birds, brown above and white below. They have thin pointed down-curved bills, which they use to extricate insects from bark. They have stiff tail feathers, like woodpeckers, which they use to support themselves on vertical trees.

- Hume's treecreeper, Certhia manipurensis

== Spotted elachura ==
Order: Passeriformes Family: Elachuridae

This species, the only one in its family, inhabits forest undergrowth throughout South East Asia.

- Spotted elachura, Elachura formosa

== Dippers ==
Order: Passeriformes Family: Cinclidae

Dippers are a group of perching birds whose habitat includes aquatic environments in the Americas, Europe and Asia. They are named for their bobbing or dipping movements.

- Brown dipper, Cinclus pallasii

== Starlings ==
Order: Passeriformes Family: Sturnidae

Starlings are small to medium-sized passerine birds. Their flight is strong and direct and they are very gregarious. Their preferred habitat is fairly open country. They eat insects and fruit. Plumage is typically dark with a metallic sheen.

- Golden-crested myna, Ampeliceps coronatus
- Common hill myna, Gracula religiosa
- European starling, Sturnus vulgaris (A)
- Daurian starling, Agropsar sturninus (A)
- Chestnut-cheeked starling, Agropsar philippensis (A)
- Black-collared starling, Gracupica nigricollis
- Siamese pied starling, Gracupica floweri
- White-shouldered starling, Sturnia sinensis
- Chestnut-tailed starling, Sturnia malabarica
- Red-billed starling, Spodiopsar sericeus (A)
- White-cheeked starling, Spodiopsar cineraceus (A)
- Common myna, Acridotheres tristis
- Vinous-breasted myna, Acridotheres leucocephalus
- Great myna, Acridotheres grandis
- Crested myna, Acridotheres cristatellus

== Thrushes and allies ==
Order: Passeriformes Family: Turdidae

The thrushes are a group of passerine birds that occur mainly in the Old World. They are plump, soft plumaged, small to medium-sized insectivores or sometimes omnivores, often feeding on the ground. Many have attractive songs.

- Long-tailed thrush, Zoothera dixoni
- Dark-sided thrush, Zoothera marginata
- White's thrush, Zoothera aurea
- Scaly thrush, Zoothera dauma
- Purple cochoa, Cochoa purpurea (A)
- Green cochoa, Cochoa viridis
- Siberian thrush, Geokichla sibirica
- Orange-headed thrush, Geokichla citrina
- Chinese blackbird, Turdus mandarinus
- Gray-winged blackbird, Turdus boulboul (A)
- Japanese thrush, Turdus cardis
- Gray-backed thrush, Turdus hortulorum (A)
- Black-breasted thrush, Turdus dissimilis (A)
- Gray-sided thrush, Turdus feae
- Eyebrowed thrush, Turdus obscurus
- Chestnut thrush, Turdus rubrocanus

== Old World flycatchers ==
Order: Passeriformes Family: Muscicapidae

Old World flycatchers are a large group of small passerine birds native to the Old World. They are mainly small arboreal insectivores. The appearance of these birds is highly varied, but they mostly have weak songs and harsh calls.

- Dark-sided flycatcher, Muscicapa sibirica
- Ferruginous flycatcher, Muscicapa ferruginea
- Asian brown flycatcher, Muscicapa dauurica
- Brown-breasted flycatcher, Muscicapa muttui (A)
- Brown-streaked flycatcher, Muscicapa williamsoni (A)
- Oriental magpie-robin, Copsychus saularis
- White-rumped shama, Copsychus malabaricus
- White-gorgeted flycatcher, Anthipes monileger
- Rufous-browed flycatcher, Anthipes solitaris
- White-tailed flycatcher, Cyornis concretus
- Hainan blue flycatcher, Cyornis hainanus
- Pale blue flycatcher, Cyornis unicolor
- Blue-throated flycatcher, Cyornis rubeculoides (A)
- Hill blue flycatcher, Cyornis whitei
- Indochinese blue flycatcher, Cyornis sumatrensis
- Brown-chested jungle-flycatcher, Cyornis sumatrensis (A)
- Large niltava, Niltava grandis
- Small niltava, Niltava macgrigoriae
- Fujian niltava, Niltava davidi
- Rufous-bellied niltava, Niltava sundara
- Vivid niltava, Niltava vivida
- Blue-and-white flycatcher, Cyanoptila cyanomelana
- Zappey's flycatcher, Cyanoptila cumatilis
- Verditer flycatcher, Eumyias thalassina
- Lesser shortwing, Brachypteryx leucophrys
- Himalayan shortwing, Brachypteryx cruralis
- Rufous-tailed robin, Larvivora sibilans
- Japanese robin, Larvivora akahige (A)
- Siberian blue robin, Larvivora cyane
- White-bellied redstart, Luscinia phaenicuroides
- Bluethroat, Luscinia svecica
- Blue whistling-thrush, Myophonus caeruleus
- White-crowned forktail, Enicurus leschenaulti
- Spotted forktail, Enicurus maculatus
- Slaty-backed forktail, Enicurus schistaceus
- Blackthroat, Calliope obscura
- Siberian rubythroat, Calliope calliope
- Chinese rubythroat, Calliope tschebaiewi (A)
- White-tailed robin, Myiomela leucura
- Blue-fronted robin, Cinclidium frontale
- Red-flanked bluetail, Tarsiger cyanurus (A)
- Himalayan bluetail, Tarsiger rufilatus
- White-browed bush-robin, Tarsiger indicus (A)
- Yellow-rumped flycatcher, Ficedula zanthopygia
- Narcissus flycatcher, Ficedula narcissina (A)
- Mugimaki flycatcher, Ficedula mugimaki
- Slaty-backed flycatcher, Ficedula hodgsonii
- Slaty-blue flycatcher, Ficedula tricolor
- Snowy-browed flycatcher, Ficedula hyperythra
- Pygmy flycatcher, Ficedula hodgsoni
- Rufous-gorgeted flycatcher, Ficedula strophiata
- Sapphire flycatcher, Ficedula sapphira
- Little pied flycatcher, Ficedula westermanni
- Taiga flycatcher, Ficedula albicilla
- Blue-fronted redstart, Phoenicurus frontalis
- Plumbeous redstart, Phoenicurus fuliginosus
- White-capped redstart, Phoenicurus leucocephalus
- Black redstart, Phoenicurus ochruros (A)
- Daurian redstart, Phoenicurus auroreus
- Chestnut-bellied rock-thrush, Monticola rufiventris
- White-throated rock-thrush, Monticola gularis
- Blue rock-thrush, Monticola solitarius
- Siberian stonechat, Saxicola maurus
- Amur stonechat, Saxicola stejnegeri
- Pied bushchat, Saxicola caprata
- Jerdon's bushchat, Saxicola jerdoni
- Gray bushchat, Saxicola ferreus

== Flowerpeckers ==
Order: Passeriformes Family: Dicaeidae

The flowerpeckers are very small, stout, often brightly coloured birds, with short tails, short thick curved bills and tubular tongues.

- Thick-billed flowerpecker, Dicaeum agile
- Yellow-vented flowerpecker, Dicaeum chrysorrheum
- Yellow-bellied flowerpecker, Dicaeum melanozanthum
- Plain flowerpecker, Dicaeum minullum
- Fire-breasted flowerpecker, Dicaeum ignipectus
- Scarlet-backed flowerpecker, Dicaeum cruentatum

== Sunbirds and spiderhunters ==
Order: Passeriformes Family: Nectariniidae

The sunbirds and spiderhunters are very small passerine birds which feed largely on nectar, although they will also take insects, especially when feeding young. Flight is fast and direct on their short wings. Most species can take nectar by hovering like a hummingbird, but usually perch to feed.

- Ruby-cheeked sunbird, Chalcoparia singalensis
- Brown-throated sunbird, Anthreptes malacensis
- Van Hasselt's sunbird, Leptocoma brasiliana
- Purple sunbird, Cinnyris asiaticus
- Olive-backed sunbird, Cinnyris jugularis
- Black-throated sunbird, Aethopyga saturata
- Mrs. Gould's sunbird, Aethopyga gouldiae
- Green-tailed sunbird, Aethopyga nipalensis
- Crimson sunbird, Aethopyga siparaja
- Fork-tailed sunbird, Aethopyga christinae
- Purple-naped spiderhunter, Kurochkinegramma hypogrammicum
- Little spiderhunter, Arachnothera longirostra
- Streaked spiderhunter, Arachnothera magna

== Fairy-bluebirds ==
Order: Passeriformes Family: Irenidae

The fairy-bluebirds are bulbul-like birds of open forest or thorn scrub. The males are dark-blue and the females a duller green.

- Asian fairy-bluebird, Irena puella

== Leafbirds ==
Order: Passeriformes Family: Chloropseidae

The leafbirds are small, bulbul-like birds. The males are brightly plumaged, usually in greens and yellows.

- Blue-winged leafbird, Chloropsis cochinchinensis
- Golden-fronted leafbird, Chloropsis aurifrons
- Orange-bellied leafbird, Chloropsis hardwickii

== Weavers and allies ==
Order: Passeriformes Family: Ploceidae

The weavers are small passerine birds related to the finches. They are seed-eating birds with rounded conical bills. The males of many species are brightly coloured, usually in red or yellow and black, some species show variation in colour only in the breeding season.

- Streaked weaver, Ploceus manyar
- Baya weaver, Ploceus philippinus (A)
- Asian golden weaver, Ploceus hypoxanthus

== Waxbills and allies ==
Order: Passeriformes Family: Estrildidae

The estrildid finches are small passerine birds of the Old World tropics and Australasia. They are gregarious and often colonial seed eaters with short thick but pointed bills. They are all similar in structure and habits, but have wide variation in plumage colours and patterns.

- Red avadavat, Amandava amandava (A)
- Pin-tailed parrotfinch, Erythrura prasina
- White-rumped munia, Lonchura striata
- Scaly-breasted munia, Lonchura punctulata
- Chestnut munia, Lonchura atricapilla

== Old World sparrows ==
Order: Passeriformes Family: Passeridae

Old World sparrows are small passerine birds. In general, sparrows tend to be small, plump, brown or grey birds with short tails and short powerful beaks. Sparrows are seed eaters, but they also consume small insects.

- House sparrow, Passer domesticus (I)
- Russet sparrow, Passer cinnamomeus
- Plain-backed sparrow, Passer flaveolus
- Eurasian tree sparrow, Passer montanus

== Wagtails and pipits ==
Order: Passeriformes Family: Motacillidae

Motacillidae is a family of small passerine birds with medium to long tails. They include the wagtails, longclaws and pipits. They are slender, ground feeding insectivores of open country.

- Forest wagtail, Dendronanthus indicus
- Gray wagtail, Motacilla cinerea
- Western yellow wagtail, Motacilla flava (A)
- Eastern yellow wagtail, Motacilla tschutschensis
- Citrine wagtail, Motacilla citreola
- Mekong wagtail, Motacilla samveasnae
- White wagtail, Motacilla alba
- Richard's pipit, Anthus richardi
- Paddyfield pipit, Anthus rufulus
- Blyth's pipit, Anthus godlewskii (A)
- Rosy pipit, Anthus roseatus (A)
- Olive-backed pipit, Anthus hodgsoni
- Red-throated pipit, Anthus cervinus
- American pipit, Anthus rubescens (A)

== Finches, euphonias, and allies ==
Order: Passeriformes Family: Fringillidae

Finches are seed-eating passerine birds, that are small to moderately large and have a strong beak, usually conical and in some species very large. All have twelve tail feathers and nine primaries. These birds have a bouncing flight with alternating bouts of flapping and gliding on closed wings, and most sing well.

- Spot-winged grosbeak, Mycerobas melanozanthos
- Yellow-billed grosbeak, Eophona migratoria (A)
- Japanese grosbeak, Eophona personata (A)
- Common rosefinch, Carpodacus erythrinus
- Scarlet finch, Carpodacus sipahi
- Black-headed greenfinch, Chloris ambigua (A)

== Old World buntings ==
Order: Passeriformes Family: Emberizidae

The emberizids are a large family of passerine birds. They are seed-eating birds with distinctively shaped bills. Many emberizid species have distinctive head patterns.

- Crested bunting, Emberiza lathami
- Black-headed bunting, Emberiza melanocephala (A)
- Chestnut-eared bunting, Emberiza fucata
- Yellow-breasted bunting, Emberiza aureola
- Little bunting, Emberiza pusilla
- Black-faced bunting, Emberiza spodocephala
- Chestnut bunting, Emberiza rutila
- Tristram's bunting, Emberiza tristrami (A)

== See also ==
- List of birds
- Lists of birds by region
