= Hwamei =

The hwamei has been split into two species:

- Chinese hwamei, Garrulax canorus
- Taiwan hwamei, Garrulax taewanus
