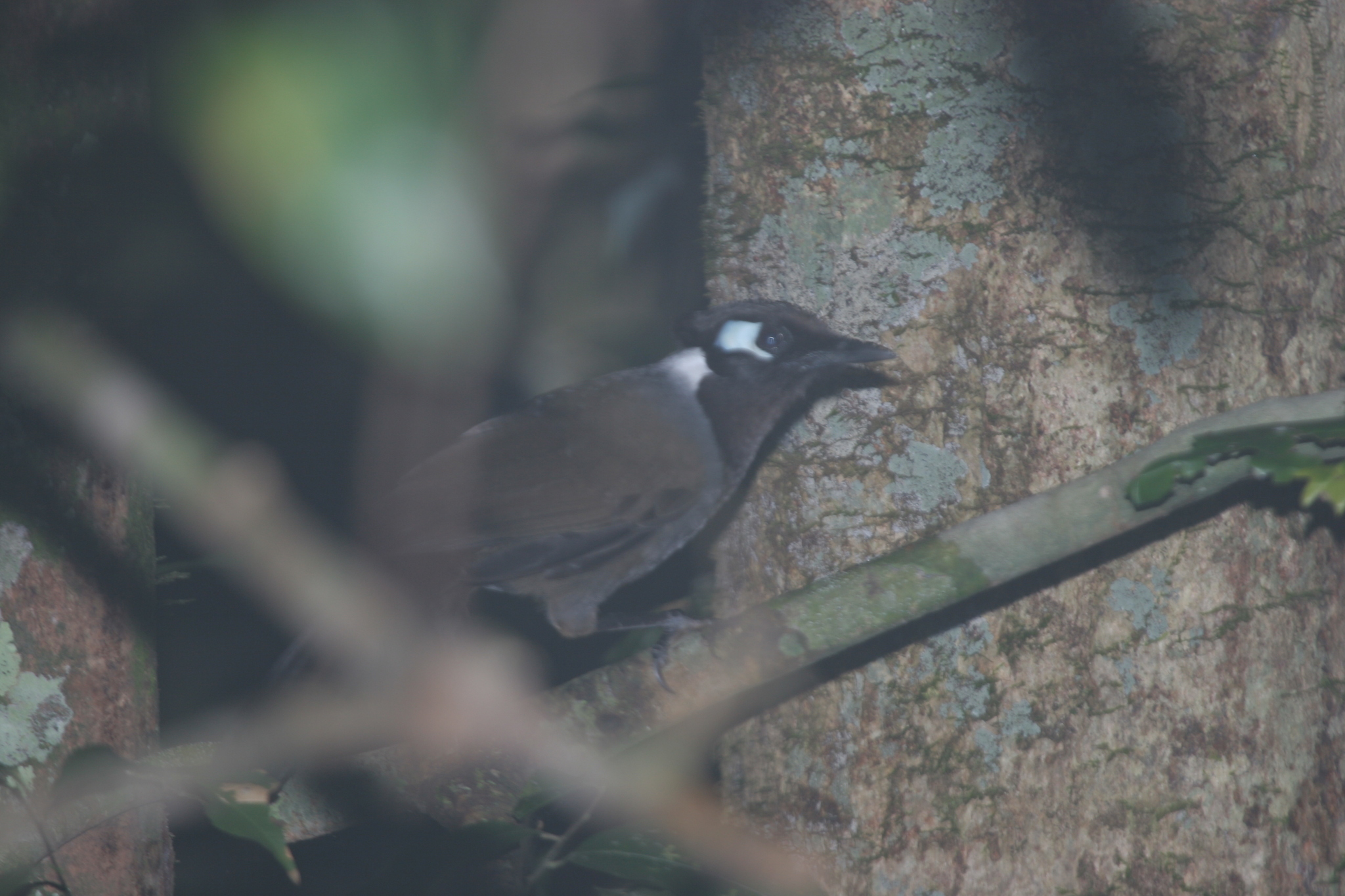

Conservation status
- Near Threatened (IUCN 3.1)

Scientific classification
- Kingdom: Animalia
- Phylum: Chordata
- Class: Aves
- Order: Passeriformes
- Family: Leiothrichidae
- Genus: Garrulax
- Species: G. ferrarius

Binomial name
- Garrulax ferrarius Riley, 1930

Synonyms
- Garrulax strepitans ferrarius

= Cambodian laughingthrush =

Species of bird

The Cambodian laughingthrush (Garrulax ferrarius) is a species of bird in the family Leiothrichidae. It used to be considered conspecific with the white-necked laughingthrush, G. strepitans. It is found in southwestern Cambodia. Its natural habitats are subtropical or tropical moist lowland forests and subtropical or tropical moist montane forests.
