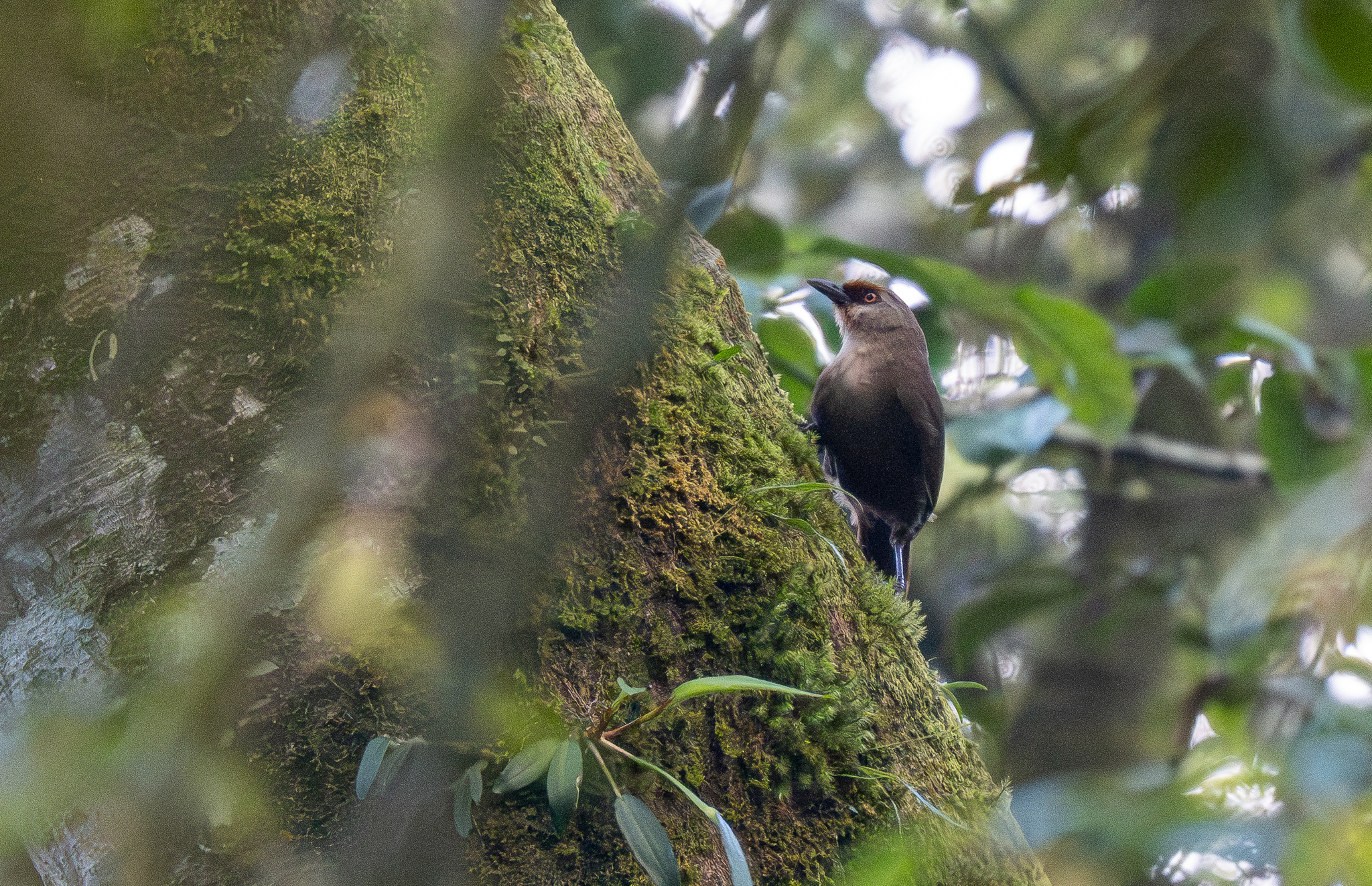

Conservation status
- Critically Endangered (IUCN 3.1)

Scientific classification
- Kingdom: Animalia
- Phylum: Chordata
- Class: Aves
- Order: Passeriformes
- Family: Leiothrichidae
- Genus: Garrulax
- Species: G. rufifrons

Binomial name
- Garrulax rufifrons Lesson, 1831

= Rufous-fronted laughingthrush =

Species of bird

The rufous-fronted laughingthrush (Garrulax rufifrons) is a bird species in the family Leiothrichidae. It is endemic to Java, where it occurs in evergreen tropical montane forests at 900–2,400 m (3,000–7,900 ft). It feeds on insects and fruit.

== Description ==
It is 27 cm (11 in) in length, and has a striking and very deep rufous-red patch on an otherwise grey plumage above its bill. Its large eyes are a striking light yellow colour. Like other laughingthrushes, it typically occurs in small family groups of five or six birds, but little is known about its breeding since only very recently has there been any success breeding in captivity and its natural habitat is extremely rugged mountains.

== Conservation ==
In 2012, it was still regarded as Near Threatened, but is listed as Critically Endangered on the IUCN Red List since 2016, as it is threatened by trapping for the cagebird trade. A breeding program has been started in Cikananga Wildlife Center, though efforts were hindered when three birds were thieved in a raid.

One subspecies, G. r. slamatensis, is possibly extinct in the wild with the last few animals remaining in private breeding centers.
