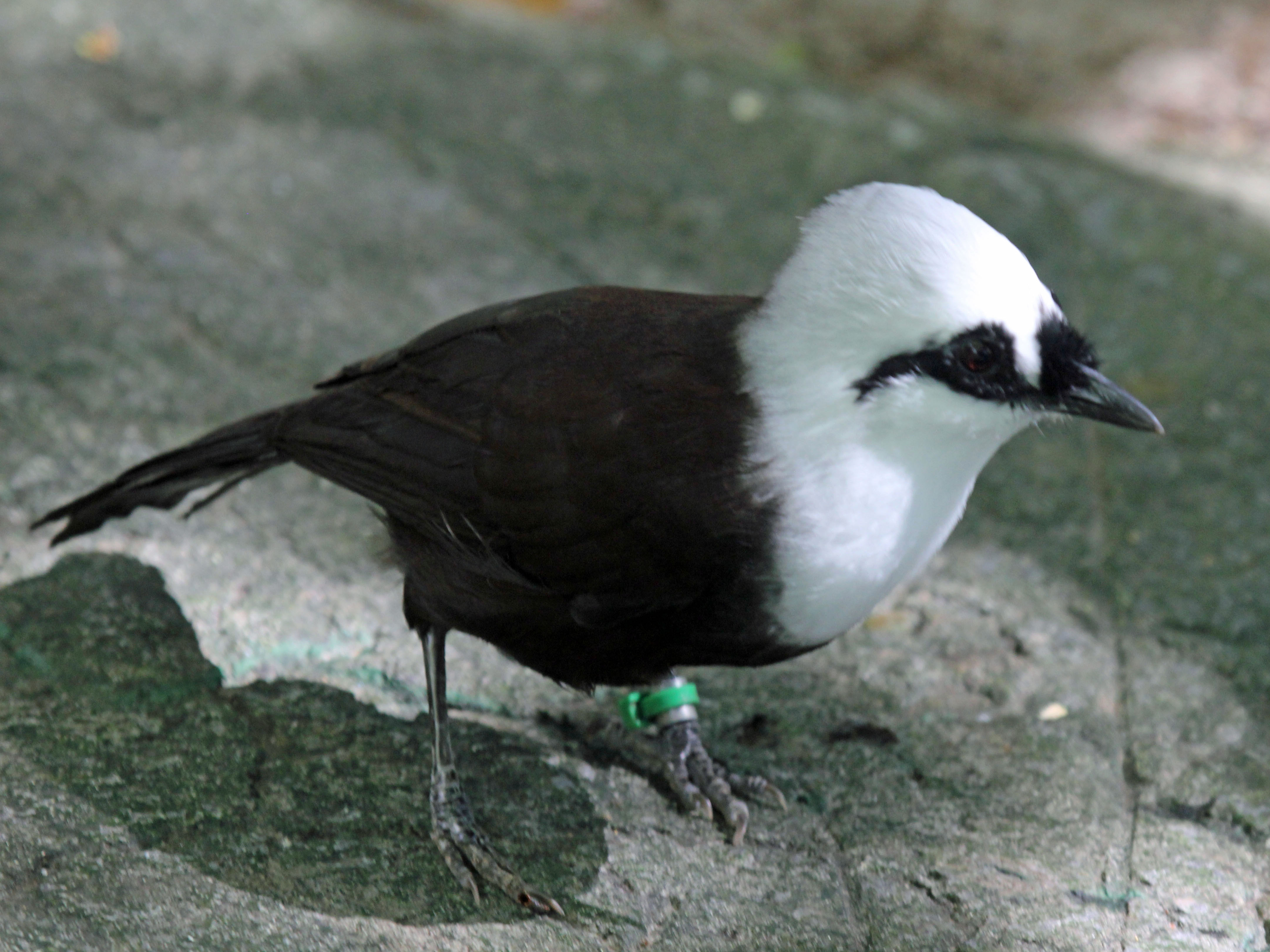

Conservation status
- Endangered (IUCN 3.1)

Scientific classification
- Kingdom: Animalia
- Phylum: Chordata
- Class: Aves
- Order: Passeriformes
- Family: Leiothrichidae
- Genus: Garrulax
- Species: G. bicolor

Binomial name
- Garrulax bicolor Hartlaub, 1844

= Sumatran laughingthrush =

Species of bird

The Sumatran laughingthrush (Garrulax bicolor), also known as the black-and-white laughingthrush, is a member of the family Leiothrichidae. It was formerly treated as a subspecies of the white-crested laughingthrush (G. leucolophus), but unlike that species the plumage of the Sumatran laughingthrush is blackish-brown and white.

It is endemic to highland forest on the Indonesian island of Sumatra, where it is threatened by habitat loss and capture for the domestic wildlife trade. Despite being protected in Indonesia, illegal trade continues, often carried out openly in bird markets on Sumatra and Java. As there appears to be an increase in international demand for this species, there have been calls for better international protection through the Convention on International Trade in Endangered Species of Wild Fauna and Flora (CITES).
