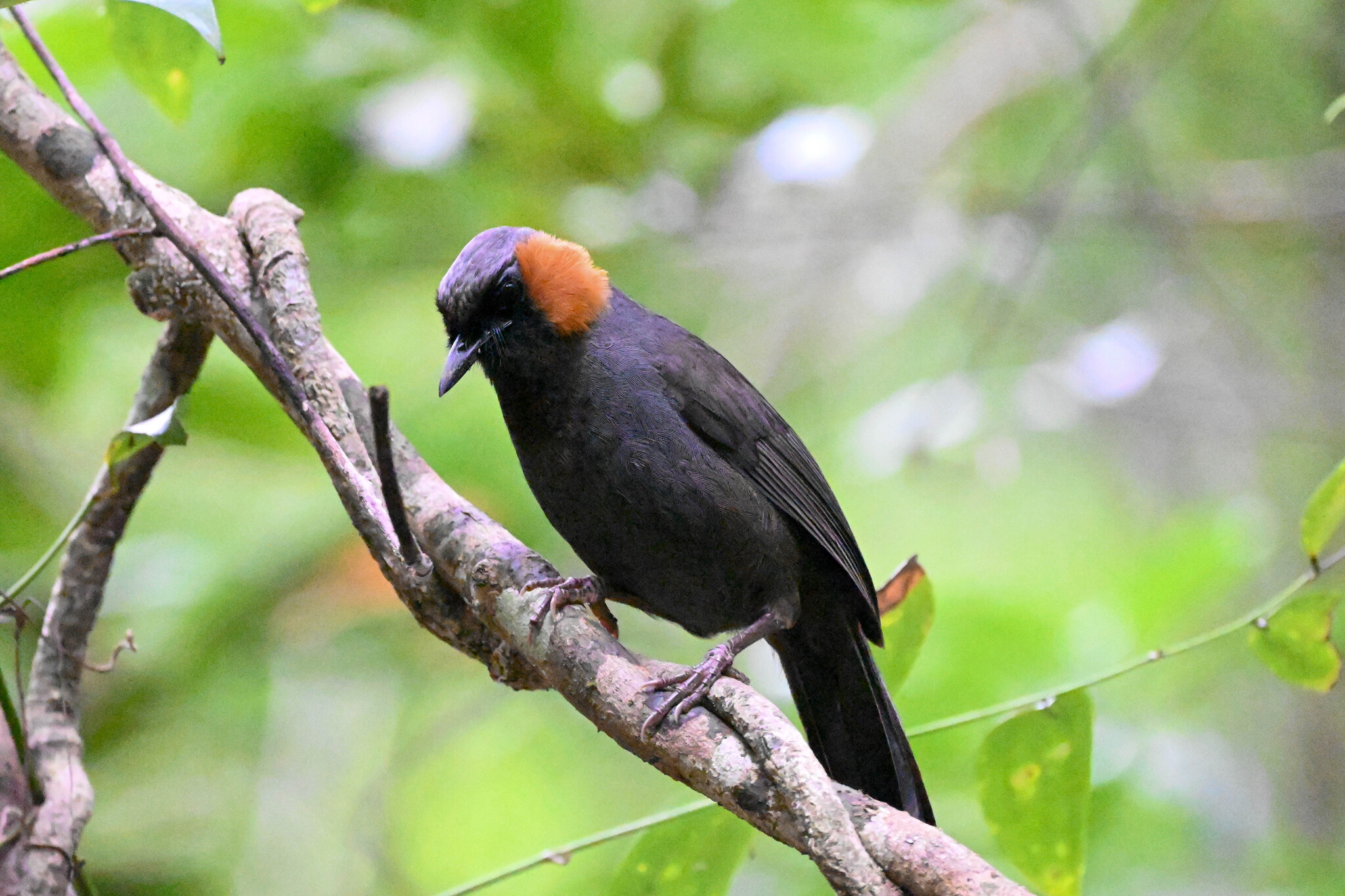

Conservation status
- Least Concern (IUCN 3.1)

Scientific classification
- Kingdom: Animalia
- Phylum: Chordata
- Class: Aves
- Order: Passeriformes
- Family: Leiothrichidae
- Genus: Garrulax
- Species: G. castanotis

Binomial name
- Garrulax castanotis (Ogilvie-Grant, 1899)

Synonyms
- Garrulax maesi castanotis

= Rufous-cheeked laughingthrush =

Species of bird

The rufous-cheeked laughingthrush (Garrulax castanotis) is a species of bird in the family Leiothrichidae. It was formerly considered to be conspecific with the grey laughingthrush, G. maesi. It is found in China, Laos, and Vietnam. Its natural habitats are subtropical or tropical moist lowland forests and subtropical or tropical moist montane forests.
