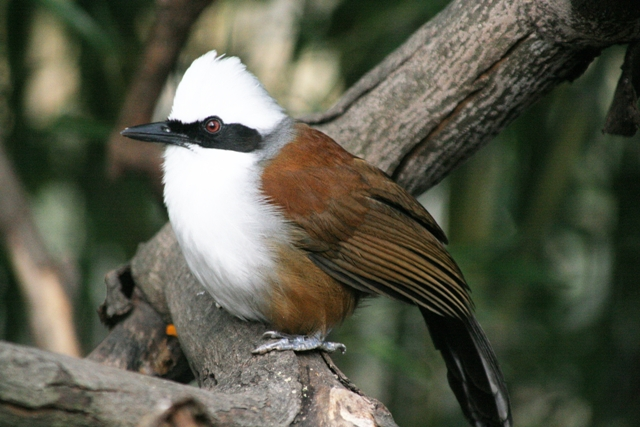
- White-crested laughingthrush (Garrulax leucolophus)

Scientific classification
- Kingdom: Animalia
- Phylum: Chordata
- Class: Aves
- Order: Passeriformes
- Family: Leiothrichidae
- Genus: Garrulax; Lesson, 1831

Type species
- Garrulax belangeri Lesson, 1831

Species
- See text

Synonyms
- Leucodioptron Bonaparte, 1854; Stactocichla Sharpe, 1883; Melanocichla Sharpe, 1883; Rhinocichla Sharpe, 1883; Dryonastes Sharpe, 1883

= Garrulax =

Genus of birds

Garrulax is a genus of passerine birds in the laughingthrush family Leiothrichidae.

The genus Garrulax was erected by the French naturalist René Lesson in 1831. The type species was designated in 1961 as Garrulax rufifrons Lesson, the rufous-fronted laughingthrush.

The genus previously included more species. Following the publication of a comprehensive molecular phylogenetic study in 2018, Garrulax was split up and species were moved to the resurrected genera Ianthocincla and Pterorhinus.

Garrulax species are heavily traded as songbirds. A survey of eight bird markets in Indonesia, carried out in 2014–2015, found 615 laughingthrushes of nine species openly for sale. Much of the trade in these species in Indonesia is illegal and is pushing a number of these species towards extinction. The Sumatran laughingthrush, for example, is in serious decline due to ongoing and uncontrolled illegal trade in bird markets on the islands of Java and Sumatra, and is increasingly found in international trade, though in lower numbers.

== Species ==
The genus contains the following 14 species:

Image	Common name	Scientific name	Distribution
	Lesser necklaced laughingthrush	Garrulax monileger	Bangladesh, Bhutan, Cambodia, China, India, Laos, Myanmar, Nepal, Thailand, and Vietnam.
	Rufous-fronted laughingthrush	Garrulax rufifrons	Java
	White-crested laughingthrush	Garrulax leucolophus	India, Bangladesh, Nepal, Bhutan, Cambodia, Myanmar, Laos, China, Vietnam, and Thailand.
	Black-hooded laughingthrush	Garrulax milleti	Laos and Vietnam
	Sumatran laughingthrush	Garrulax bicolor	Sumatra
	White-necked laughingthrush	Garrulax strepitans	Yunnan, Laos, Myanmar and Thailand
	Cambodian laughingthrush	Garrulax ferrarius	Cambodia
	Grey laughingthrush	Garrulax maesi	southern China
	Rufous-cheeked laughingthrush	Garrulax castanotis	China, Laos, and Vietnam
	Sunda laughingthrush	Garrulax palliatus	Brunei, Indonesia, and Malaysia
	Chinese hwamei	Garrulax canorus	south-eastern and central China and in northern and central Vietnam and Laos
	Taiwan hwamei	Garrulax taewanus	Taiwan
	Spot-breasted laughingthrush	Garrulax merulinus	Yunnan, Northeast India, Laos, Myanmar, north-west Thailand, and northern Vietnam
	Orange-breasted laughingthrush	Garrulax annamensis	Vietnam
