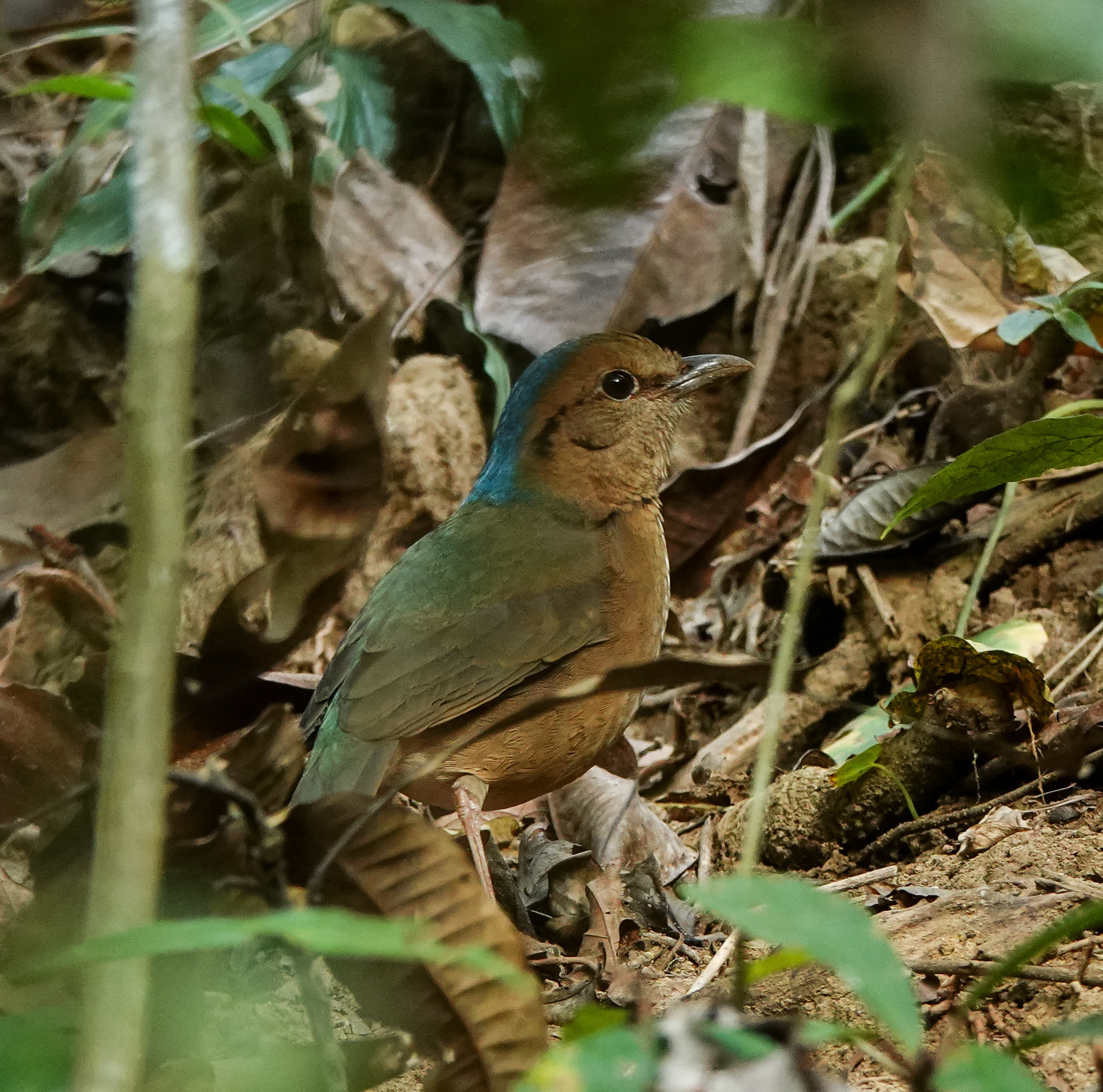

Conservation status
- Least Concern (IUCN 3.1)

Scientific classification
- Kingdom: Animalia
- Phylum: Chordata
- Class: Aves
- Order: Passeriformes
- Family: Pittidae
- Genus: Hydrornis
- Species: H. nipalensis

Binomial name
- Hydrornis nipalensis (Hodgson, 1837)
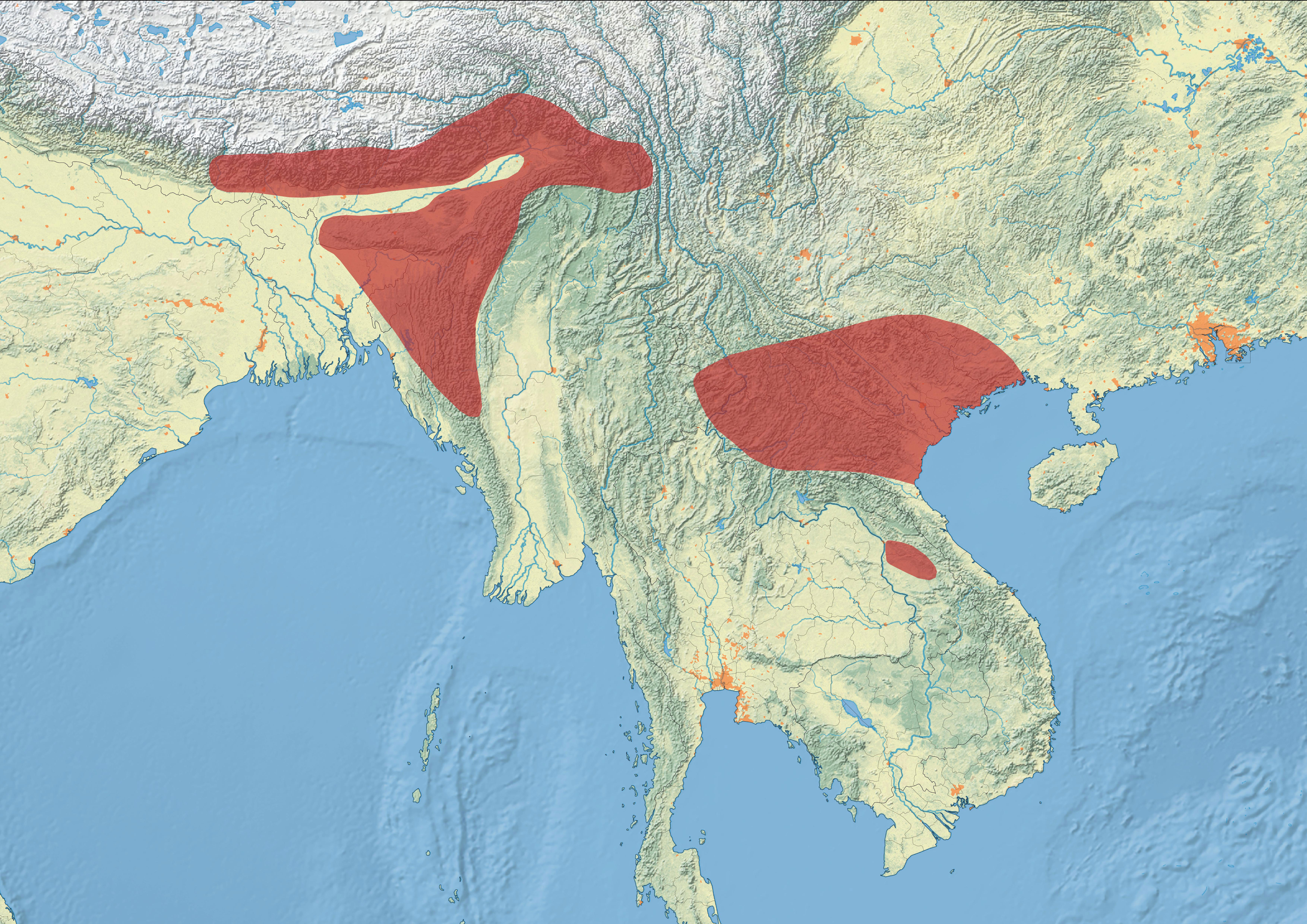

Synonyms
- Pitta nipalensis

= Blue-naped pitta =

Species of bird

The blue-naped pitta (Hydrornis nipalensis) is a species of bird in the family Pittidae.

== Description ==
It is a brightly colored bird, with a stub-tail. It is blue and green above, with a reddish-yellow coloring below. The bird's nape and hindneck are bright blue, and the tail is brown with a bit of green. The male and female birds are similar, but the female's hindcrown is reddish-brown, not blue, and it has a green hindneck.

== Distribution and habitat ==
It is found in Bangladesh, Bhutan, China, India, Laos, Myanmar, Nepal, and Vietnam. Its natural habitats are subtropical or tropical moist lowland forests and subtropical or tropical moist montane forests. It can be found in bamboo jungles.

== Behavior ==
It is a terrestrial bird. It usually ventures out into clearings only early in the morning and late in the evening. Its call is a double whistle and can be heard when it is on the ground and from a tree at dawn and dusk. The nesting season is April to August, during which both the male and female birds share the parental duties.

== Diet and feeding ==
Its diet consists of ground insects and other small animals.
