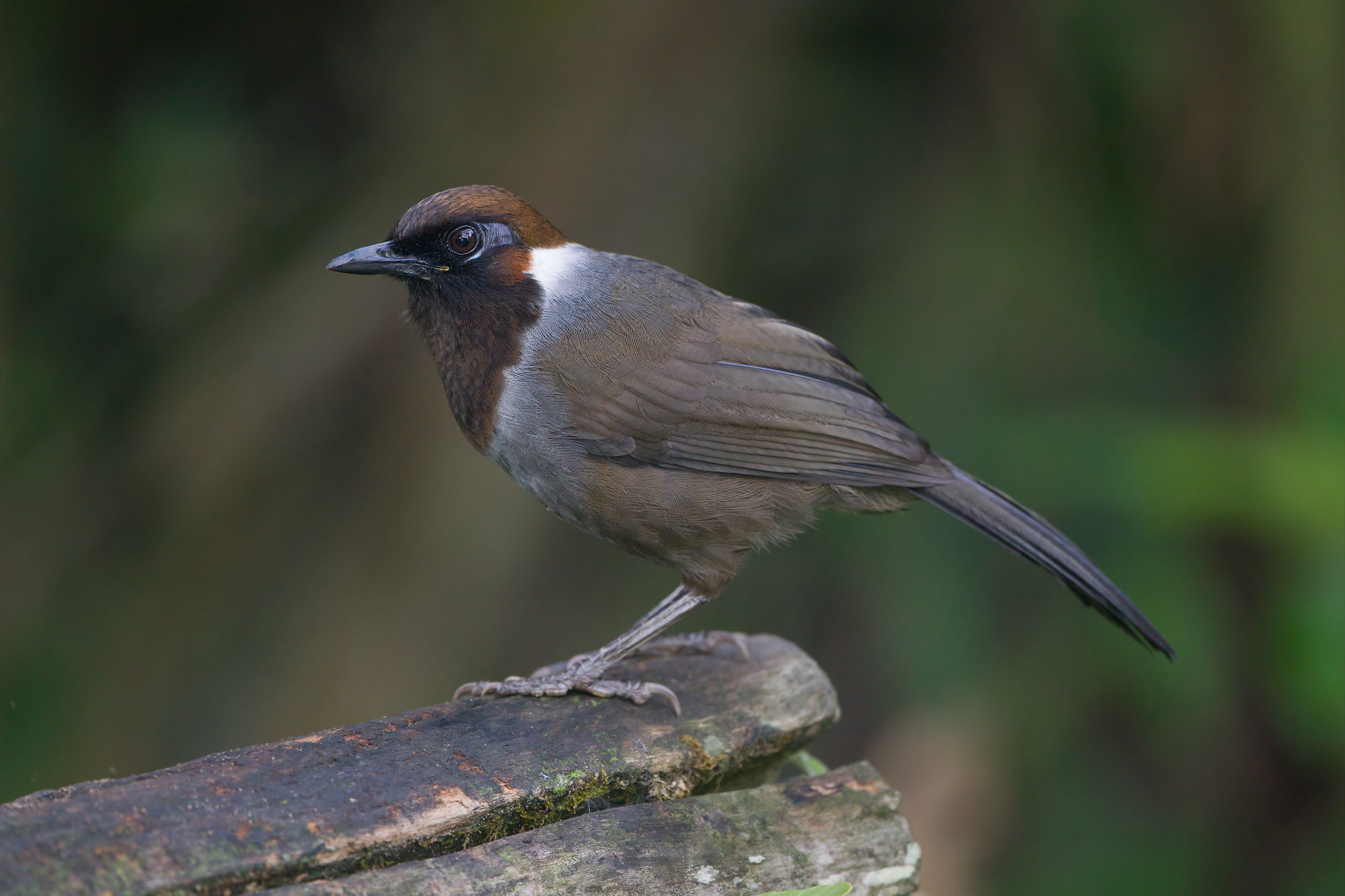
- In Mae Wong National Park, Thailand

Conservation status
- Least Concern (IUCN 3.1)

Scientific classification
- Kingdom: Animalia
- Phylum: Chordata
- Class: Aves
- Order: Passeriformes
- Family: Leiothrichidae
- Genus: Garrulax
- Species: G. strepitans

Binomial name
- Garrulax strepitans Blyth, 1855

= White-necked laughingthrush =

Species of bird

The white-necked laughingthrush (Garrulax strepitans) is a species of bird in the family Leiothrichidae. It is found in Yunnan, Laos, Myanmar and Thailand. Its natural habitats are subtropical or tropical moist lowland forests and subtropical or tropical moist montane forests.

== Description ==
The adult white-necked laughingthrush is about 32 cm (13 in) long and has a chestnut crown, a brownish-black face and throat and a rather diffuse white collar separating these from the body. The general plumage is a pale brownish-grey. The iris is dark, and the bill and legs are grey. It has a distinctive laughing call. It resembles the grey laughingthrush (Garrulax maesi) apart from the darker head.

== Distribution and habitat ==
The white-necked laughingthrush is native to tropical southeastern Asia. Its range includes central and northern Thailand, eastern Myanmar, western Laos and Yunnan province in southwestern China. Its altitudinal range is between 500 and 1,800 m (1,600 and 5,900 ft). It typically occurs in lowland and montane broad-leaved forest and scrubland.

== Status ==
The white-necked laughingthrush has a very wide range and is described as fairly common, apart from in China where it is described as rare. The population trend is probably in decline because of habitat destruction, but the total population is large and the decline is not sufficiently rapid to cause concern. No other threats have been identified and the International Union for Conservation of Nature (IUCN) has assessed the bird's conservation status as being of "least concern".
