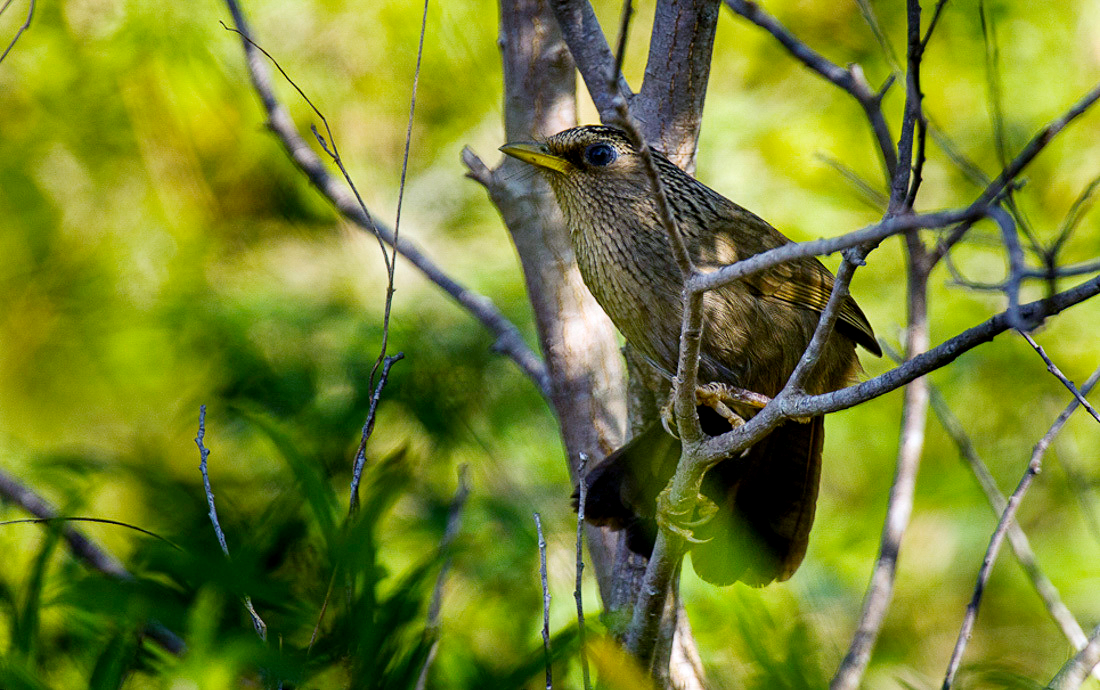

Conservation status
- Near Threatened (IUCN 3.1)
- CITES Appendix II

Scientific classification
- Kingdom: Animalia
- Phylum: Chordata
- Class: Aves
- Order: Passeriformes
- Family: Leiothrichidae
- Genus: Garrulax
- Species: G. taewanus

Binomial name
- Garrulax taewanus R. Swinhoe, 1859

Synonyms
- Leucodioptron taewanum

= Taiwan hwamei =

Species of bird

The Taiwan hwamei (Garrulax taewanus) is a passerine bird in the family Leiothrichidae. The species was first described by Robert Swinhoe in 1859. It is endemic to the island of Taiwan. It was formerly regarded as a subspecies of the Chinese hwamei (Garrulax canorus) but has since been split as a separate species. It is estimated to have diverged from the Chinese hwamei about 1.5 million years ago.

It is about 24 centimetres long. It is mainly grey brown with heavy streaks on the crown, nape and back and fine streaks on much of the underparts. It lacks the white eye-markings of the Chinese hwamei which is also more rufous in colour and less heavily streaked. The whistling song is long, melodious and varied.

It inhabits secondary woodland in the foothills and lower mountains up to 1,200 metres above sea level. It forages alone, in pairs or in small groups, searching amongst the understorey for insects and seeds.

It has a declining population of 1,000–10,000 individuals and is classified as a near threatened species by BirdLife International. Habitat loss may affect its numbers but the main threat is hybridization with introduced populations of the Chinese hwamei.

== Hybridization ==
On Taiwan, the Taiwan hwamei is known to interbreed with its sister species, the Chinese hwamei (Garrulax canorus). The Chinese hwamei is imported from China to Taiwan for the melodic and complex song of the males. Due to flaws in sexing of birds, females are accidentally imported and, because they cannot sing, are released into the wild where they hybridize with the native Taiwan hwamei. As a result of the release of this invasive species and its interaction with the native Taiwan hwamei, Li et al. suggest that the amount of introgression (found to be 20% in their study) is compromising the distinctiveness of the Taiwan species.
