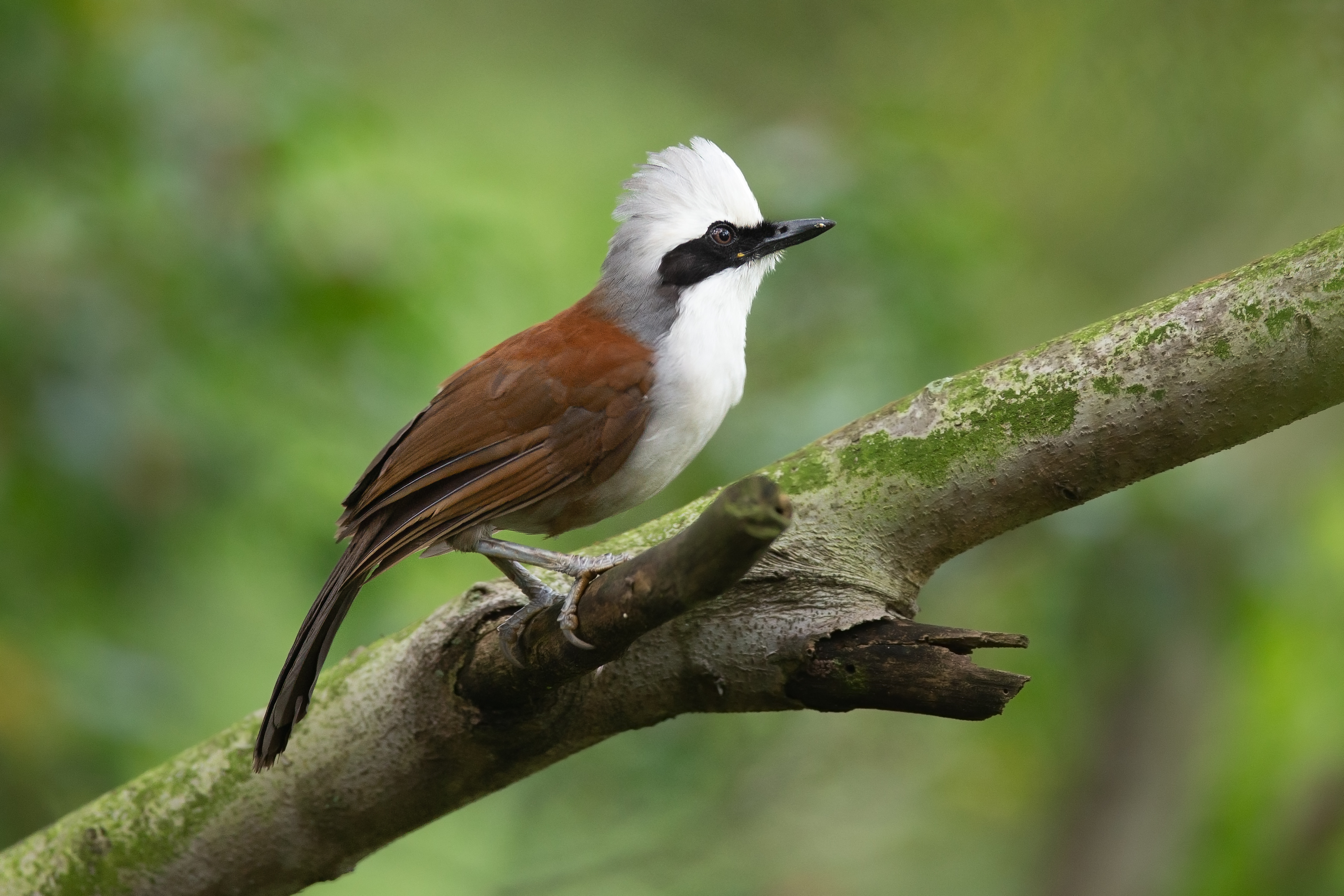
- Introduced, Singapore

Conservation status
- Least Concern (IUCN 3.1)

Scientific classification
- Kingdom: Animalia
- Phylum: Chordata
- Class: Aves
- Order: Passeriformes
- Family: Leiothrichidae
- Genus: Garrulax
- Species: G. leucolophus

Binomial name
- Garrulax leucolophus (Hardwicke, 1816)

= White-crested laughingthrush =

Species of bird

The white-crested laughingthrush (Garrulax leucolophus) is a member of the family Leiothrichidae. It is a highly social and vocal bird found in forest and scrub from the Himalayan foothills to Southeast Asia.

White-crested laughingthrush singing – Khao Yai National Park, Thailand

The voice of the white-crested laughingthrush

== Taxonomy ==
The white-crested laughingthrush is a member of the family Leiothrichidae, recently split from the Old World babbler family, Timaliidae. Its scientific name Garrulax leucolophus comes from Latin garrire "to chatter", in reference to its very vocal nature, and from Greek leukós "white" and lophos "crest".

Four subspecies are identified: G. l. leucolophus or western white-crested laughingthrush, G. l. patkaicus, G. l. belangeri, and G. l. diardi or eastern white-crested laughingthrush. A former subspecies, G. l. bicolor, has been re-classified as a species of its own, the endemic Sumatran laughingthrush, on account of its lack of characteristic rufous plumage, different face pattern, and shorter tail.

== Description ==
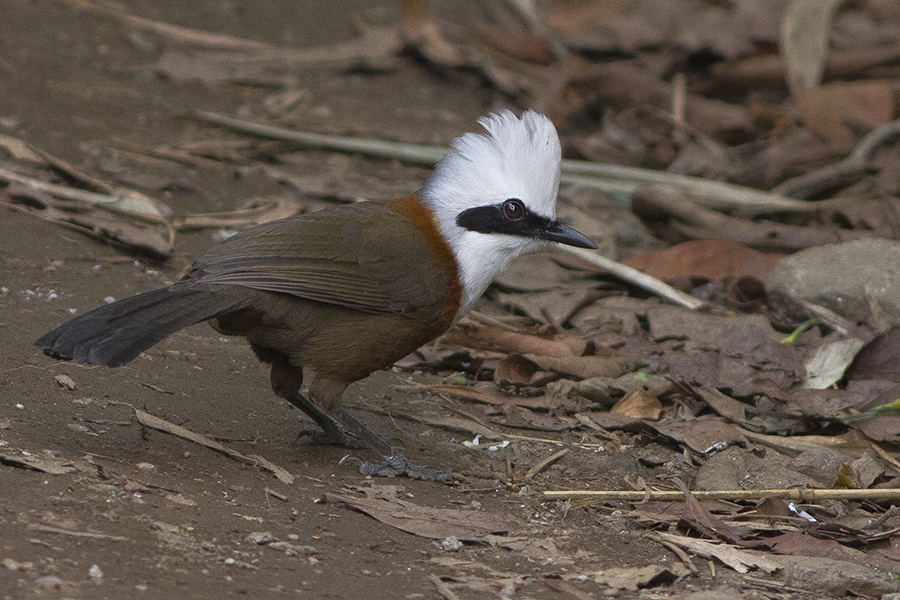
Pangolakha Wildlife Sanctuary, East Sikkim district, Sikkim, India.

Like other birds in its genus, G. leucolophus has a stocky build, with strong blackish legs and bill, rounded tail, and voluminous plumage. Its body length averages 30 cm, and its tail ranges from 13 to 15 cm.

It is named after its characteristic white hood and raised crest. It is also easily recognizable due to its broad and elongated black eye-mask. The mantle, back and underparts from the lower breast down are rufescent, contrasting with the white head, throat and upper chest and fading into darker olive-brown on the tail and upper wings. The nape is light gray.

Females look almost identical to males but have a smaller crest, duller mantle, and slightly more pronounced gray on the nape. Juveniles can be identified by their shorter crest and tail, paler mask, brownish nape and brighter mantle.

Subspecies have subtle variations in plumage: G. l. patkaicus' mantle is a darker, richer chestnut; G. l. belangeri has white extending lower onto the belly and paler underparts; G. l. diardi even more so and with a brighter upper mantle.

== Habitat and distribution ==
=== Native range ===
Garrulax leucolophus has one of the widest ranges of all laughingthrushes and as such is at minimal risk of being threatened by extinction. It is native to the following countries: India, Bangladesh, Nepal, Bhutan, Cambodia, Myanmar, Laos, China, Vietnam, and Thailand. The four subspecies have slightly different distributions:

- Garrulax leucolophus leucolophus: N India, Nepal, Bhutan, S China (Tibet)
- Garrulax leucolophus patkaicus: NE India, Bangladesh, Myanmar, S China (Yunnan)
- Garrulax leucolophus belangeri: Myanmar, Thailand
- Garrulax leucolophus diardi: Myanmar, Thailand, Laos, Cambodia, Vietnam, S China (Yunnan)

=== Introduced populations ===
The white-crested laughingthrush is a popular caged bird species, and it is likely that individuals which escaped or were voluntarily released during religious practices are the cause for the expansion of G. l. diardi's range to Malaysia and Singapore in the 1970s–1980s. The exotic bird trade has brought it to the UK and US as well, but no wild populations have been reported there.

It is thought to only remain in small numbers in Malaysia due to trapping, but in Singapore it has become well-established and may be displacing native birds with similar ground-foraging habits that are threatened by habitat fragmentation, such as Abbott's babbler. Its success as an invasive species is attributed, among other factors, to social, cooperative behaviour, high flock densities, and being able to adapt to many different habitats including parks, gardens and degraded forest.

=== Habitat ===
G. leucolophus is commonly found in foothill forests, up to elevations of 1600m. It favours dense, moist and shady thickets and scrubs, and the edge and understory of broadleaved secondary forests, where it can hide from predators and take shelter from the subtropical sun. It will typically only come out of cover to feed on the ground. The ideal habitat of the white-crested laughingthrush also includes bamboos, which provide excellent nesting substrate and camouflage.

== Behaviour ==
=== Vocalisation ===
White-crested laughingthrushes are social birds, usually in flocks of 6-12 individuals (but reportedly up to 40). These small parties can be very noisy as a leader initiates a call (typically with short syllables such as ow, u'ow or u'ah) and is answered with a chorus, in sometimes disorderly fashion. The name "laughingthrush" comes from the "loud cackling outbursts" they produce, often followed by a quieter, more pleasant chatter or muttering (kerWICKerWICK or nYUKoop nYUKoop). In total, 4 different types of vocalizations exist, in order of increasing length and complexity: short sounds, phrases (repeated elements), sentences and subsongs. Since they are a highly gregarious species, most of the sounds they produce serve a social purpose, such as reminding other members of their flock of their presence and their movements, alerting them of danger or intruders, or inciting mobbing (they are known to be aggressive birds to different flocks or species).

=== Diet ===
Similarly to other laughingthrushes, G. leucolophus is omnivorous and opportunistic. It subsists mostly on invertebrates such as beetles, spiders, flies, mealworms and caterpillars, snails and leeches. However, it also eats fruits, seeds, nectar, and even small reptiles and amphibians (snakes, lizards and frogs). In Singapore, observers have noticed individuals picking at human food and garbage. One witness even reported birds soliciting humans for scraps.

When looking for food, G. leucolophus forages on the ground, often in small parties, hopping from one place to the next and tossing the leaf litter aside with its beak to uncover invertebrates.

=== Reproduction ===
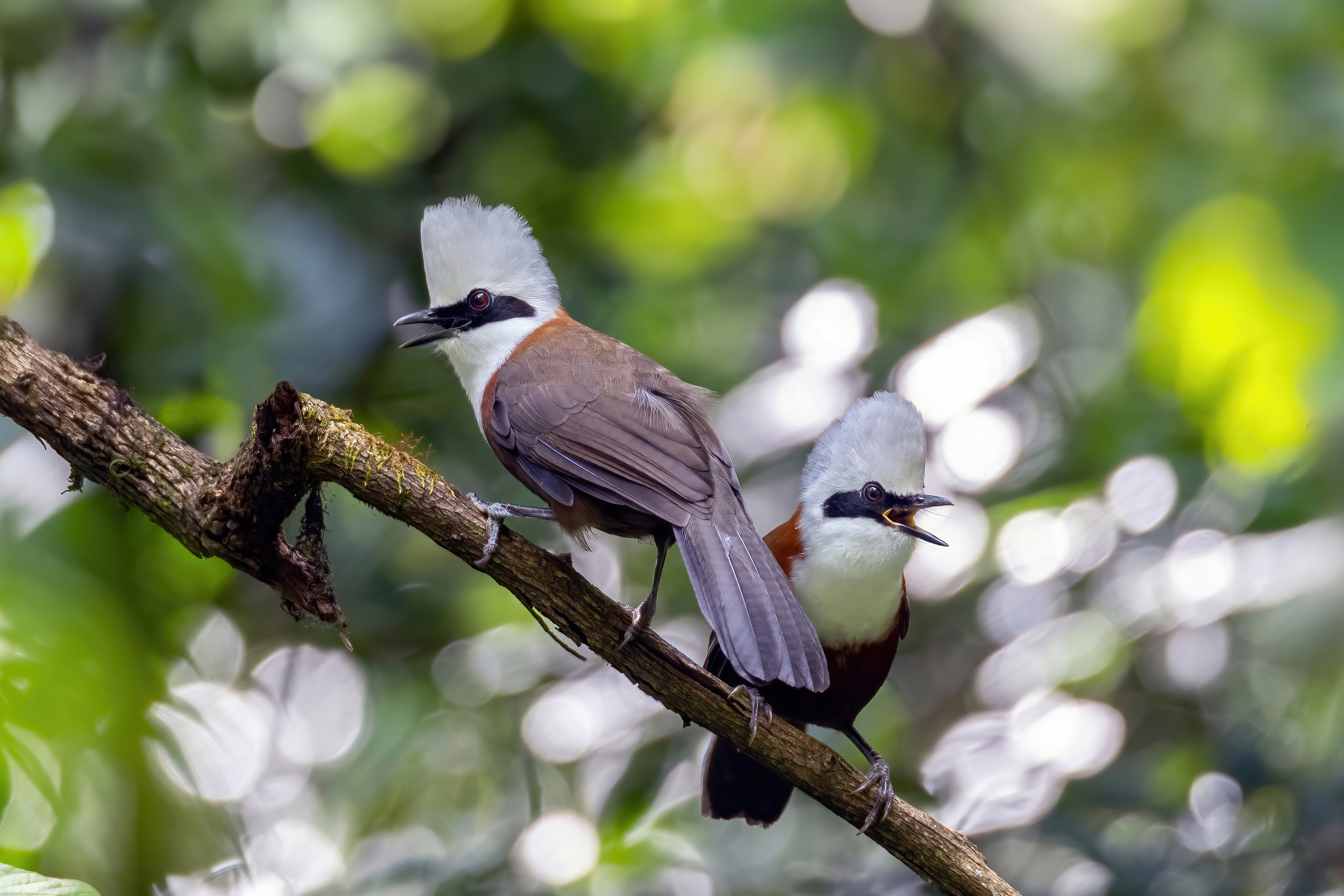
Pair of White-crested-Laughingthrush in Nepal

White-crested laughingthrushes start reproducing in their second year. They breed several times between February and September. Nests are shallow and cup-shaped, in shrubs and trees at heights between 2 and 6m, made with bamboo leaves and grass bound with twigs and stems. In each nest are laid 2–6 pure white eggs, estimated at 6.5 g each, which are incubated for 13–17 days by both parents. The male and female also share brooding and feeding duties while the chicks develop from completely naked to miniature adults in the 14–16 days after hatching. These tasks are not distributed just between the parents, however—White-crested laughingthrushes are cooperative breeders. A female may share a nest with another, and 3 or more adults may take turns incubating the eggs and feeding the chicks. In fact, these "helpers" are not always adults: young from the current year's previous clutch sometimes help with building the nest or feeding their siblings.
