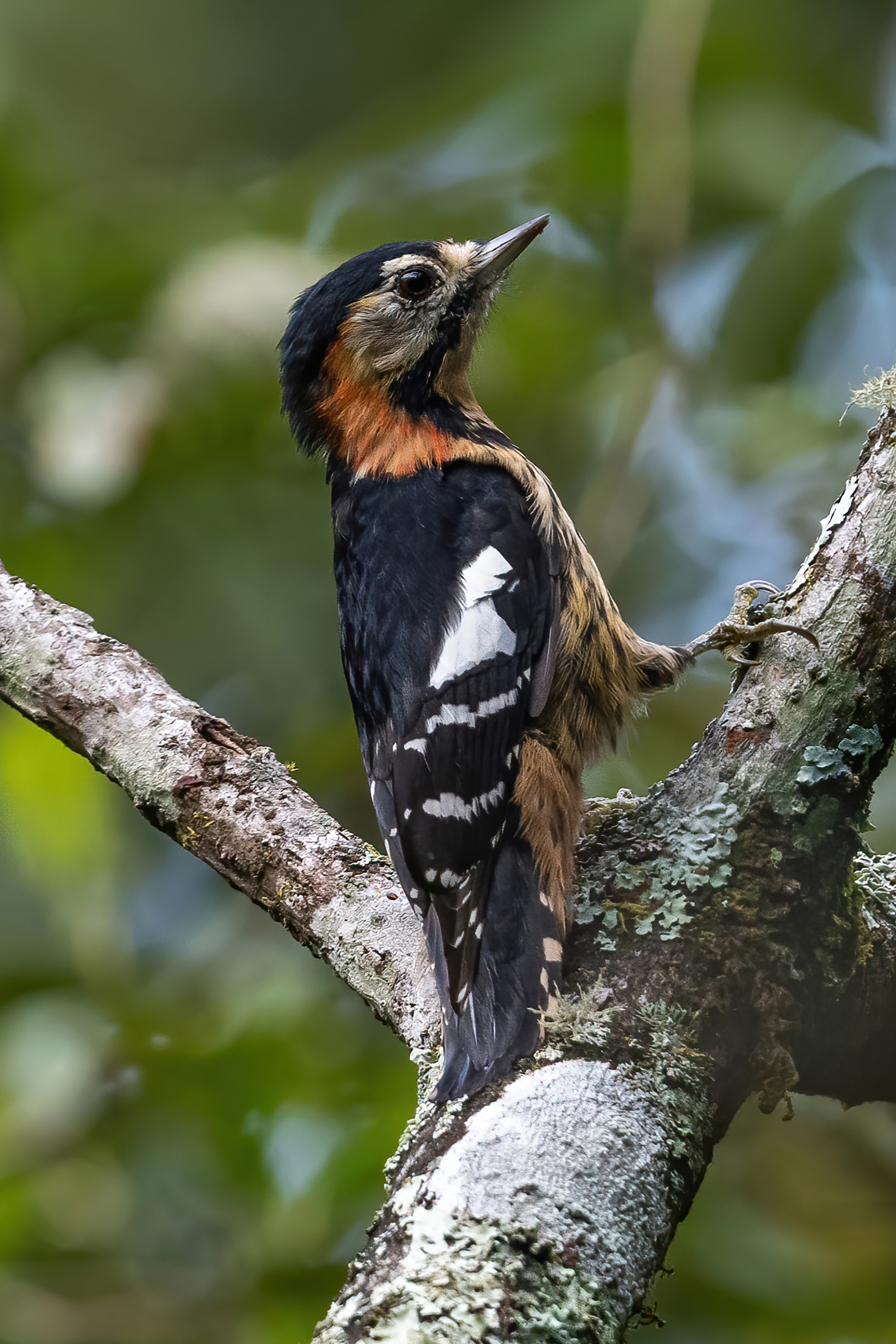
- In Shivapuri Nagarjun National Park, Nepal.

Conservation status
- Least Concern (IUCN 3.1)

Scientific classification
- Kingdom: Animalia
- Phylum: Chordata
- Class: Aves
- Order: Piciformes
- Family: Picidae
- Genus: Dryobates
- Species: D. cathpharius

Binomial name
- Dryobates cathpharius (Blyth, 1843)

Synonyms
- Dendrocopos cathpharius

= Crimson-naped woodpecker =

Species of bird

The crimson-naped woodpecker, crimson-breasted woodpecker or scarlet-breasted woodpecker (Dryobates cathpharius) is a species of bird in the family Picidae. It is found in Bhutan, China, India, Myanmar and Nepal. Its natural habitats are subtropical or tropical moist lowland forests and subtropical or tropical moist montane forests. It was previously considered conspecific with necklaced woodpecker.

== Taxonomy ==
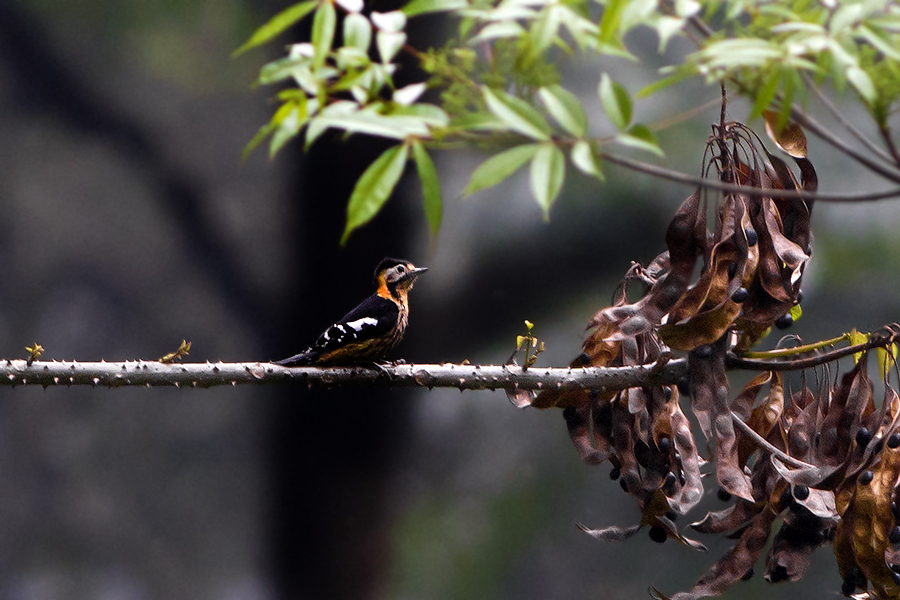
From Khangchendzonga National Park, West Sikkim, India

The taxonomy of this species is somewhat confused. D. cathpharius is sometimes included with Dendrocopos pernyii as a single species, but the two have various amounts of red on head and breast and other distinguishing features, including size. In their Handbook of the Birds of the World Alive, del Hoyo, J. et al. recognises them as separate species. Molecular analysis puts both close to D. minor and D. pubescens. There are three subspecies; D. c. cathpharius from western and central Nepal to Arunachal Pradesh in northeastern India; D. c. ludlowi from southeastern Tibet; and D. c. pyrrhothorax from Meghalaya, Nagaland, Manipur, Mizoram and western Myanmar.

== Description ==
The mantle, back and wings are black, with some white spotting and light barring on the wings and one larger white patch. The upper side of the tail is black with white barring on the outer feathers, and the underside is barred in black and white. The chin and throat are white, the central breast is red and the rest of the breast and belly are white or buff streaked with black, with a varying amount of red or pink near the vent. The forehead is white and the crown black, and the male has a red patch on the nape. A black streak extends from the malar region to the nape before continuing to the sides of the chest.
