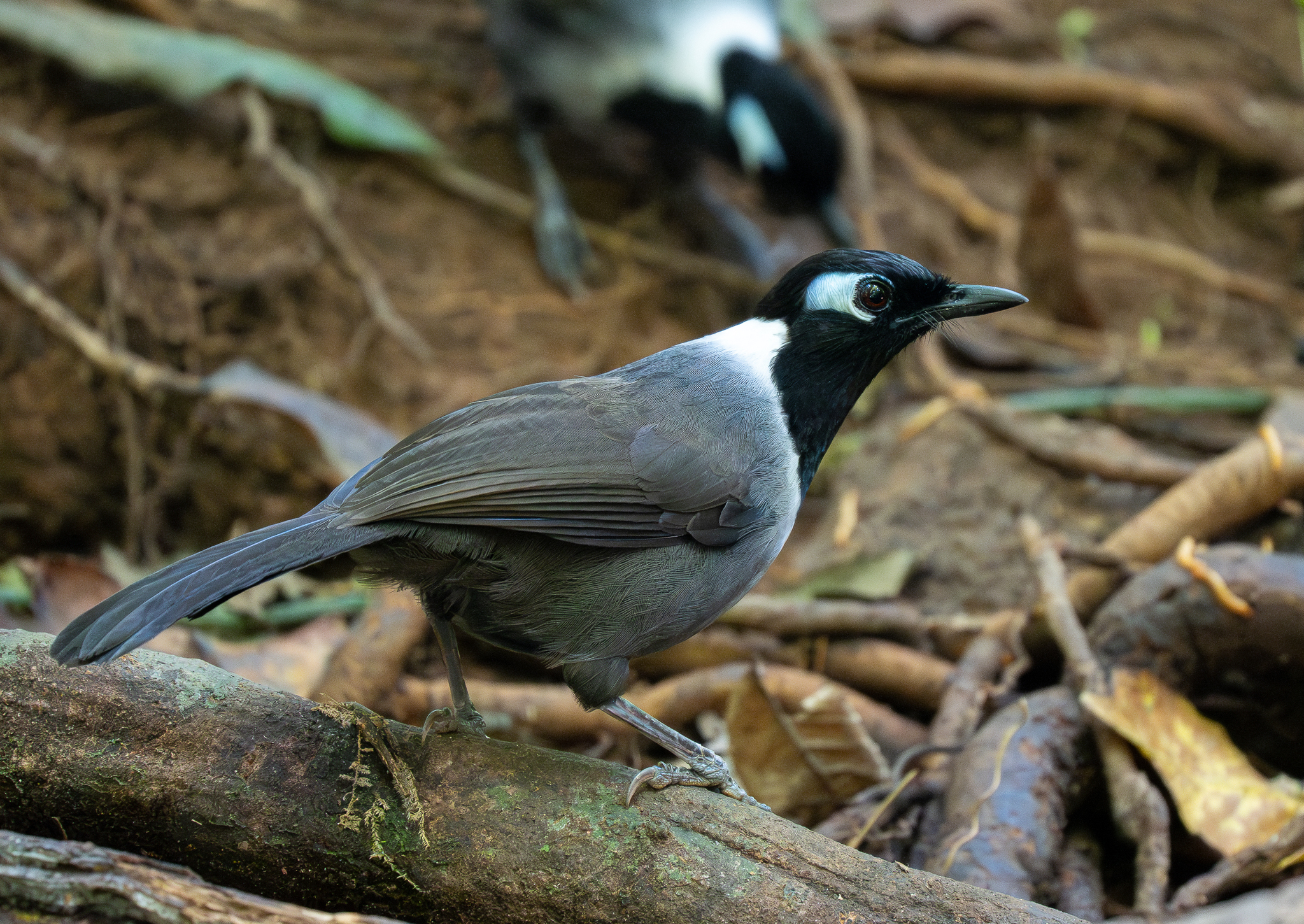

Conservation status
- Least Concern (IUCN 3.1)

Scientific classification
- Kingdom: Animalia
- Phylum: Chordata
- Class: Aves
- Order: Passeriformes
- Family: Leiothrichidae
- Genus: Garrulax
- Species: G. milleti

Binomial name
- Garrulax milleti Robinson & Kloss, 1919

= Black-hooded laughingthrush =

Species of bird

The black-hooded laughingthrush (Garrulax milleti) is a species of bird in the family Leiothrichidae. It is found in Laos and Vietnam. Its natural habitats are subtropical or tropical moist lowland forests and subtropical or tropical moist montane forests. It is threatened by habitat loss.
