= Grey laughingthrush =

Conservation status
- Least Concern (IUCN 3.1)

Scientific classification
- Kingdom: Animalia
- Phylum: Chordata
- Class: Aves
- Order: Passeriformes
- Family: Leiothrichidae
- Genus: Garrulax
- Species: G. maesi

Binomial name
- Garrulax maesi (Oustalet, 1890)

Species of bird

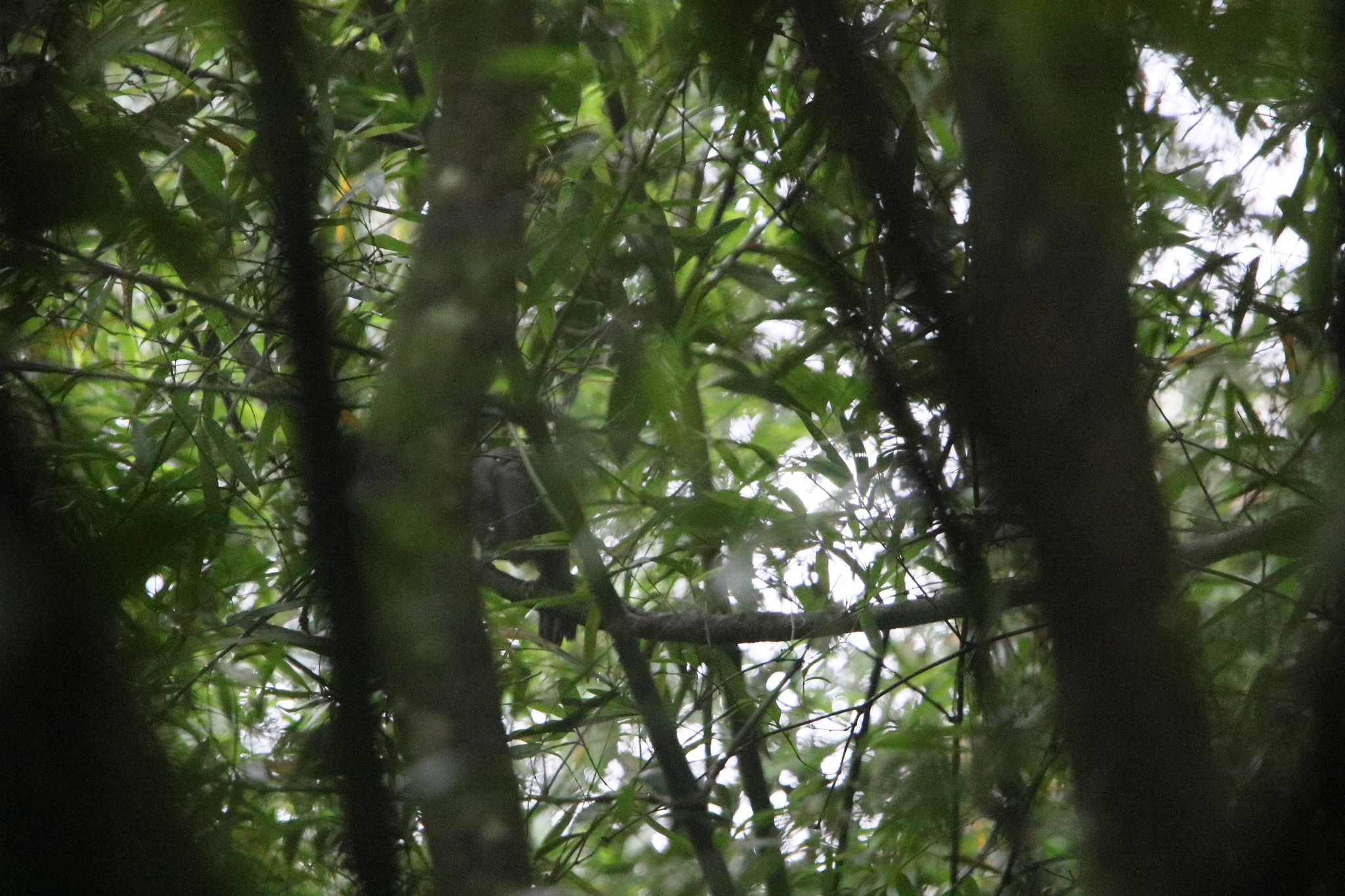
Habitat of Garrulax maesi with live bird

The grey laughingthrush (Garrulax maesi) is a species of bird in the family Leiothrichidae. It is found in southern China, far northern Laos and Vietnam. Its natural habitats are subtropical or tropical moist lowland forest and subtropical or tropical moist montane forest.
