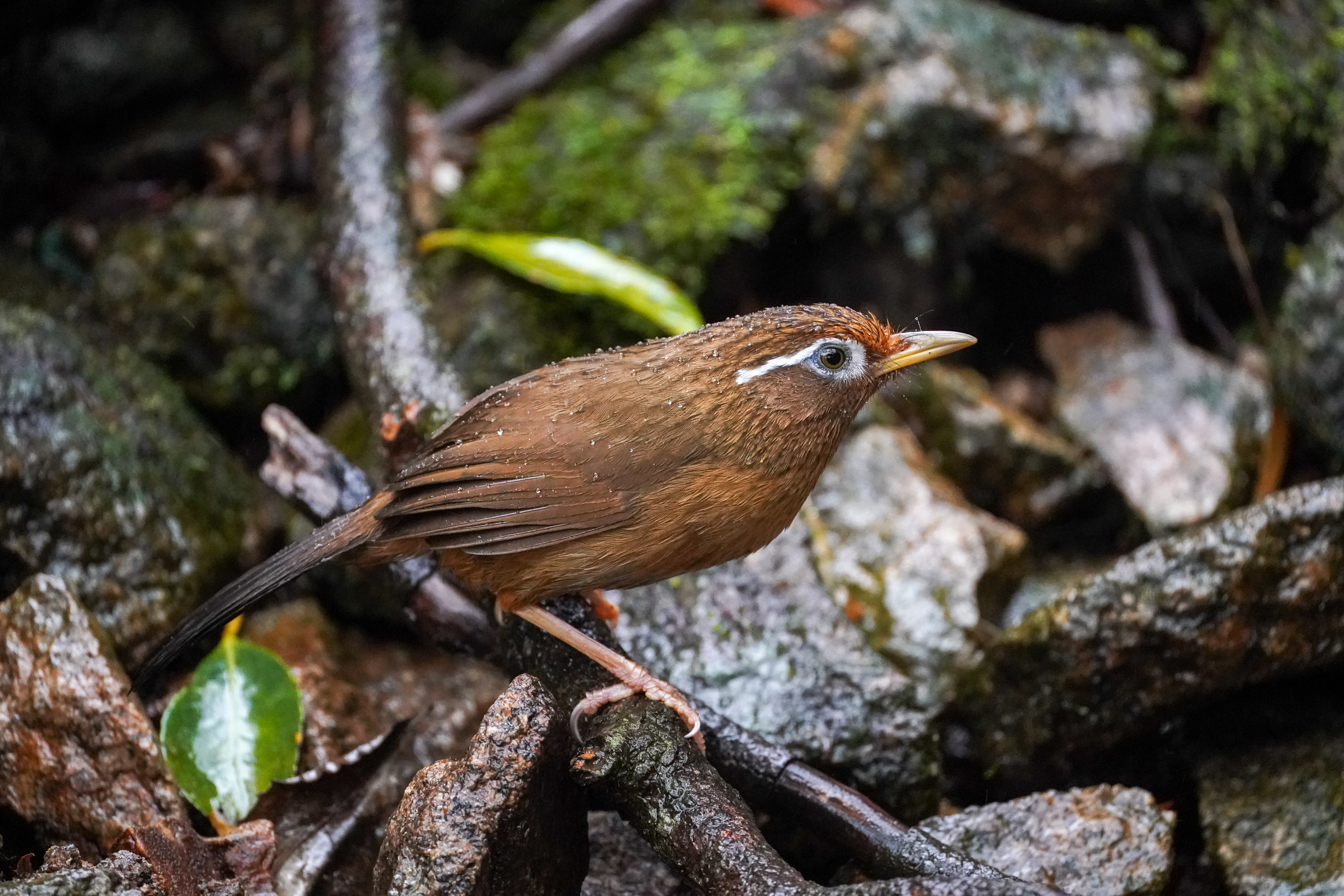
- G. c. canorum at Mount Sanqing, Jiangxi, China

Conservation status
- Least Concern (IUCN 3.1)
- CITES Appendix II

Scientific classification
- Kingdom: Animalia
- Phylum: Chordata
- Class: Aves
- Order: Passeriformes
- Family: Leiothrichidae
- Genus: Garrulax
- Species: G. canorus

Binomial name
- Garrulax canorus (Linnaeus, 1758)

Synonyms
- Turdus canorus Linnaeus, 1758; Leucodioptron canorum (Linnaeus, 1758)

= Chinese hwamei =

Species of bird

The Chinese hwamei or melodious laughingthrush (Garrulax canorus) is a passerine bird of eastern Asia in the laughingthrush family Leiothrichidae. The name "hwamei" comes from its Chinese name huà méi, which means "painted eyebrow", referring to the distinctive marking around the bird's eyes. The species is a popular cagebird because of its attractive song.

== Taxonomy ==
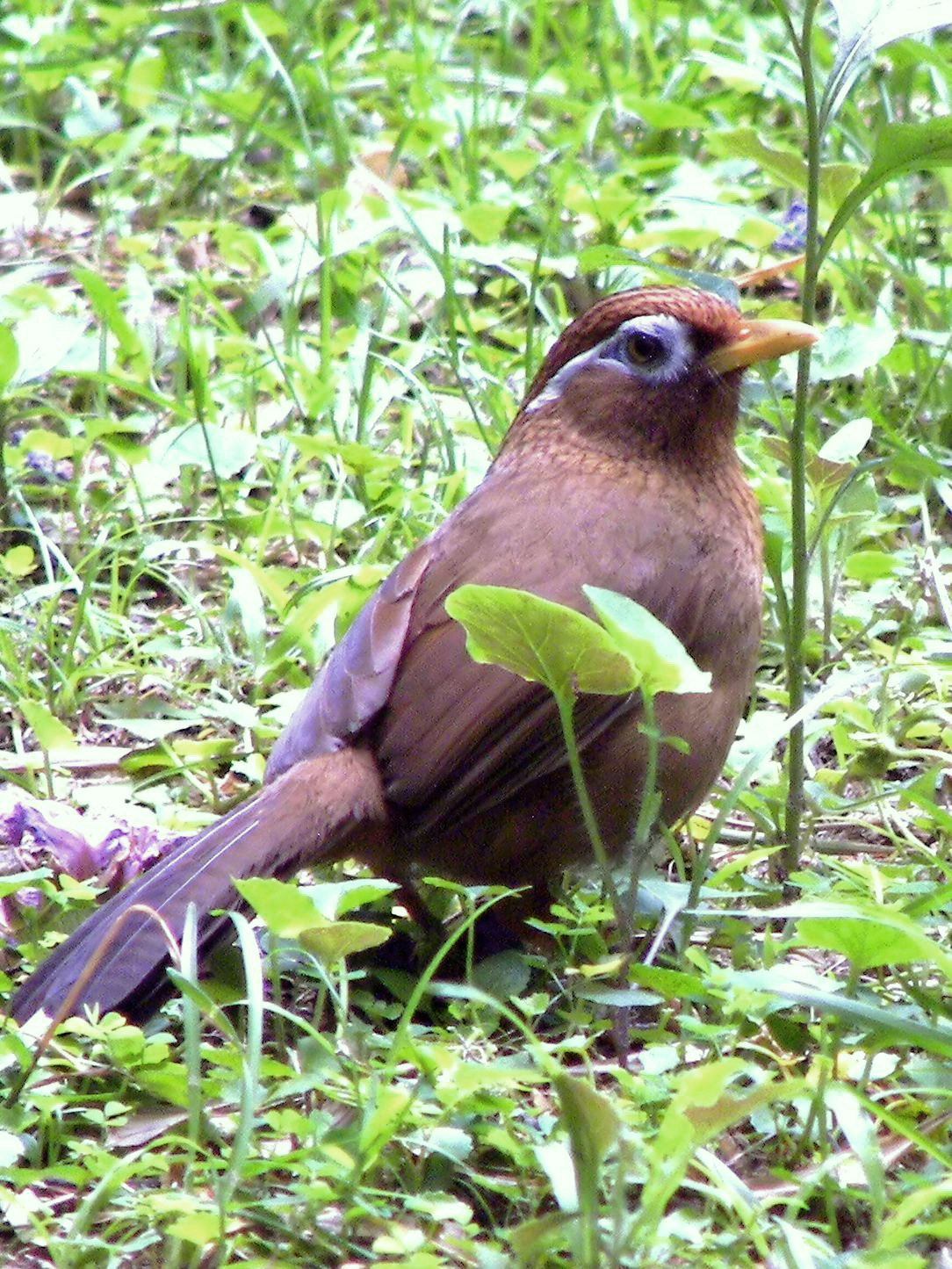
G. c. canorum in Hong Kong, China

The Chinese hwamei was formally described by the Swedish naturalist Carl Linnaeus in 1758 in the tenth edition of his Systema Naturae. He placed it with the thrushes in the genus Turdus and coined the binomial name Turdus canorus. Linnaeus specified the type locality as Bengal and China but this has been restricted to Amoy (now Xiamen) in Fujian, China. The specific epithet is Latin meaning "melodious" (from canere "to sing"). The Chinese hwamei is now one of 14 laughingthrushes placed in the genus Garrulax that was introduced in 1831 by René Lesson.

Two subspecies are recognised: G. c. canorus, native to mainland Asia, and G. c. owstoni of Hainan Island. The Taiwan hwamei (G. taewanum) was formerly considered to be a subspecies of the Chinese hwamei but has recently been split as a separate species. This was based on a study comparing the DNA sequence of the mitochondrial cytochrome b gene which suggested that the two species diverged about 1.5 million years ago with the two Chinese hwamei subspecies diverging about 600,000 years ago.

== Description ==
It is 21 to 25 cm long with broad, rounded wings and a fan-shaped tail. The plumage is mostly reddish-brown with dark streaks on the crown, back and throat. There is a white ring around the eye which extends backwards as a white stripe. The bill and feet are yellowish. Birds on Hainan Island (G. c. owstoni) are paler below and more olive-coloured above. The Taiwan hwamei is greyer and more streaked and lacks the white markings on the head.

The song is a loud, clear, varied whistling with regular repetition and imitations of other birds. The call is a rasping whistle or rattle.

== Distribution and habitat ==
The nominate subspecies G. c. canorus occurs across south-eastern and central China and in northern and central Vietnam and Laos. The race G. c. owstoni is found on Hainan.

The bird inhabits scrubland, open woodland, secondary forest, parks and gardens up to 1800 metres above sea level. It is common in much of its range and is not considered a threatened species.

G. c. canorus has been introduced to Taiwan, Singapore, Japan and Hawaii. In the Hawaiian Islands it was introduced in the early 20th century and now occurs in both native forest and man-made habitats. It is common on Kauai, Maui and Hawaii Island but less so on Oahu and Molokai. The Chinese hwamei was introduced to Taiwan in large numbers in the 1980s and hybridisation with the native Taiwan hwamei is occurring which may threaten the genetic uniqueness of the latter form.

== Behaviour ==
It is a skulking bird which is often very difficult to see. It typically feeds on the ground among leaf litter, foraging for insects and fruit. It usually occurs in pairs or in small groups.

The breeding season lasts from May to July. A large cup-shaped nest is built up to two metres above the ground in a tree or bush or amongst undergrowth. Two to five blue or blue-green eggs are laid.
