= Chance (surname) =

Chance is a surname and may refer to:

- Albert Bishop Chance (1873–1949), American businessman and inventor
- Beth Chance (born 1968), American statistician
- Bob Chance (1940–2013), American baseball player
- Bobbie Shaw Chance, American actress
- Britton Chance (1913–2010), American biochemist
- Britton Chance Jr. (1940–2012), American naval architect
- Dean Chance (1941–2015), American baseball pitcher
- Edgar Chance (1881–1955), British industrialist and ornithologist
- Floyd Chance (1925–2005), American session musician
- Frank Chance (1877–1924), American baseball player and manager
- Fred Chance, American illustrator
- Frederick Chance (1852–1932), British politician
- Genie Chance (1927–1998), American journalist, radio broadcaster and Alaska State Senator
- Geoffrey Chance (1893–1987), English cricketer.
- George Chance (footballer) (1896–1952), English footballer
- George Chance (photographer) (1885–1963), New Zealand photographer
- George Quentin Chance (1904–?), Irish radiologist
- Greyson Chance (born 1997), American singer
- Hugh Chance (1911–1998), American religious person
- Jacob Chance (born 1993), Australian basketball coach
- James Chance (born 1953), American new wave musician
- James Timmins Chance (1814–1902), English industrialist and baronet
- Jane Chance (born 1945), American literary scholar
- Janet Chance (1886–1953), British feminist writer and reformer
- Jean C. Chance (born 1938), American journalism professor
- Jeff Chance (1954–2008), American country music singer
- John Barnes Chance (1932–1972), American composer
- John Richard Newton Chance (1911–1983), English writer as John Lymington
- Karen Chance, American novelist
- Kenneth Chance (1879–1969), English industrialist
- Kim Chance (1946–2017), Australian farmer and politician
- Larry Chance (1940–2023), American musician
- Mark Chance, American chemist
- Matthew Chance (born 1970), British television journalist
- Michael Chance (born 1955), English countertenor
- Miracle Chance (born 1992), English actress, singer and composer
- Nancy Laird Chance (born 1931), American pianist and composer
- Naomi Chance (1927–2003), English film and television actress
- Noel Chance (born 1951), Irish racehorse trainer
- Olivia Chance (born 1993), New Zealand soccer player
- Patrick Chance (1857–1919), Irish nationalist politician
- Rebecca Chance, pen name of Lauren Milne Henderson (born 1966), English freelance journalist and novelist
- Richie Chance (born 1983), American film and television actor, producer and acting coach
- Robert Lucas Chance (1782–1865), English glass merchant and manufacturer
- Ronnie Chance (born 1968), Georgia State Senator
- Thomas Williams Chance (1872–1954), Welsh Baptist minister
- Toby Chance (born 1960), British-born South African politician

== See also ==
- Chance Brothers, English glass-makers
- Chancey (surname)
- Chace (surname)
