= James Chance (disambiguation) =

James Chance is an American saxophonist.

James Chance may also refer to:

- Sir James Timmins Chance, industrialist, philanthropist and pioneering designer of lighthouse optics
- Jimmy Chance, TV sitcom character from Raising Hope

== See also ==
- Chance (surname)
