= Pound Green =

Hamlet in Worcestershire

Coordinates: 52.404138°N 2.360643°W

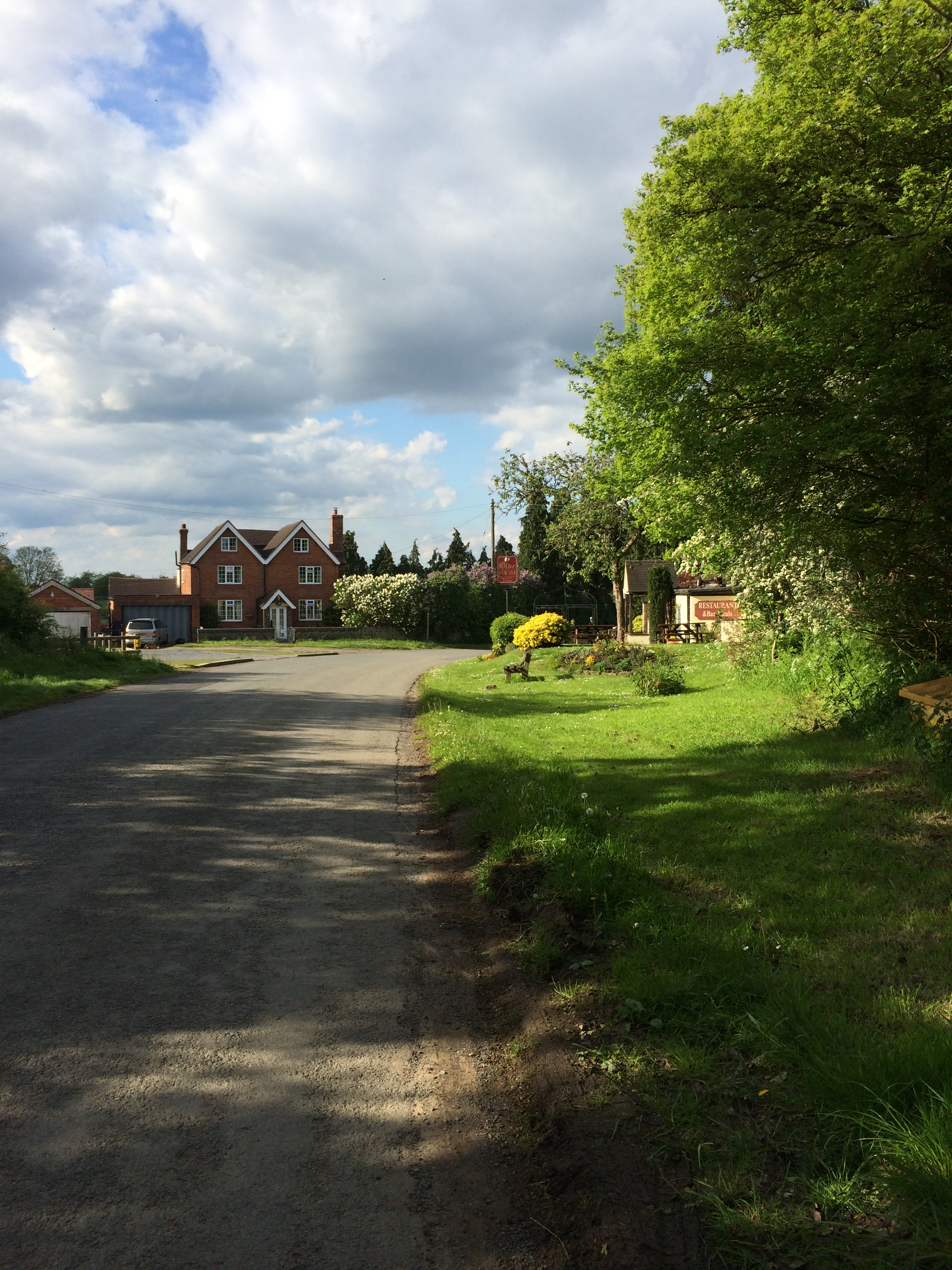
- Route 45

- Location within Worcestershire
- OS grid reference: SO757792
  - London: 134 miles (216 km)
- Civil parish: Upper Arley
- District: Wyre Forest
- Shire county: Worcestershire
- Region: West Midlands
- Country: England
- Sovereign state: United Kingdom
- Post town: BEWDLEY
- Postcode district: DY12
- Dialling code: 01299
- Police: West Mercia
- Fire: Hereford and Worcester
- Ambulance: West Midlands

Pound Green is a hamlet in Upper Arley, Worcestershire, England. It has a number of tourist landmarks such as Ye Olde New Inn and a village hall that also serves Button Oak village. Historically, the village is within the boundaries of Staffordshire.

Pound Green Common is an area of common land, west of the village which was the location of Edgar Chance's studies of the common cuckoo (Cuculus canorus) which included the first ever photography of a cuckoo laying her egg. The civil parish of Upper Arley had a population of 767 in 2021.
