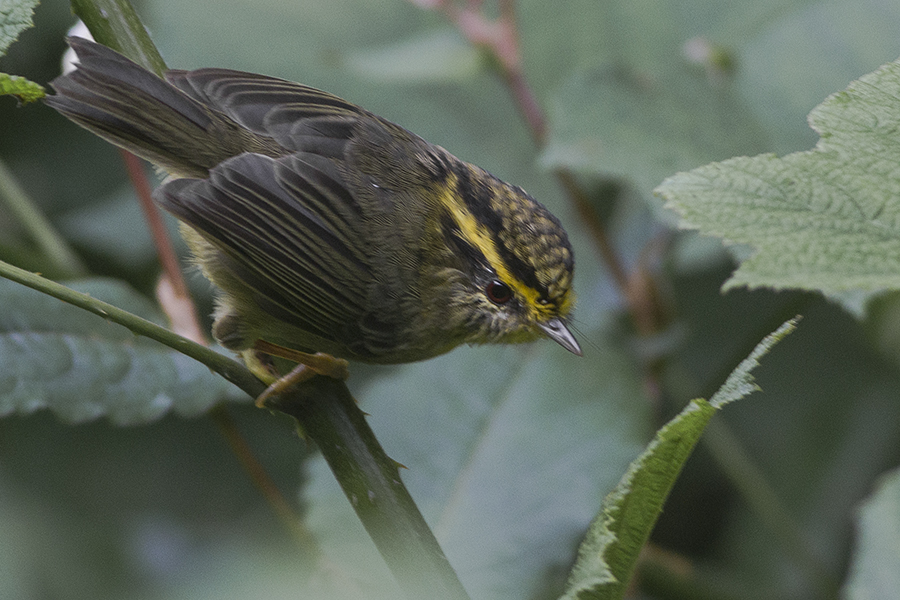
- Yellow-throated fulvetta (Schoeniparus cinereus) from Khangchendzonga National Park in West Sikkim, India

Scientific classification
- Kingdom: Animalia
- Phylum: Chordata
- Class: Aves
- Order: Passeriformes
- Superfamily: Sylvioidea
- Family: Pellorneidae
- Genus: Schoeniparus; Hume, 1874

Type species
- Minla rufogularis Mandelli, 1873

Species
- See text

= Schoeniparus =

Genus of birds

Schoeniparus is a genus of small passerine birds in the family Pellorneidae. They are found in the eastern Himalayas, Mainland Southeast Asia, southern China and Taiwan.

== Taxonomy ==
The genus Schoeniparus was introduced in 1874 by the English naturalist Allan Octavian Hume. As Hume did not specify a type species for the genus, in 1883 Richard Bowdler Sharpe designated the type as Minla rufogularis Mandelli, 1873, the rufous-throated fulvetta. The genus name combines the Ancient Greek σχοινος/skhoinos meaning "reed" or "rush" with the genus name Parus that had been introduced in 1758 by Carl Linnaeus for the tits.

The species in genus Schoeniparus were formerly placed in the genus Alcippe with other fulvettas. Genetic analysis found the latter genus polyphyletic and Schoeniparus was resurrected for a group of seven species.

The genus currently contains the following seven species:

Image	Common name	Scientific name	Distribution
	Golden-fronted fulvetta	Schoeniparus variegaticeps	southern China.
	Yellow-throated fulvetta	Schoeniparus cinereus	eastern Himalayas and northern Laos
	Rufous-winged fulvetta	Schoeniparus castaneceps	eastern Himalayas and Indochina
	Black-crowned fulvetta	Schoeniparus klossi	Vietnam.
	Rufous-throated fulvetta	Schoeniparus rufogularis	southeastern Asia from the Himalayas through Indochina to southwestern Cambodia.
	Rusty-capped fulvetta	Schoeniparus dubius	Bhutan, China, India, Laos, Myanmar, and Vietnam.
	Dusky fulvetta	Schoeniparus brunneus	China and Taiwan.
