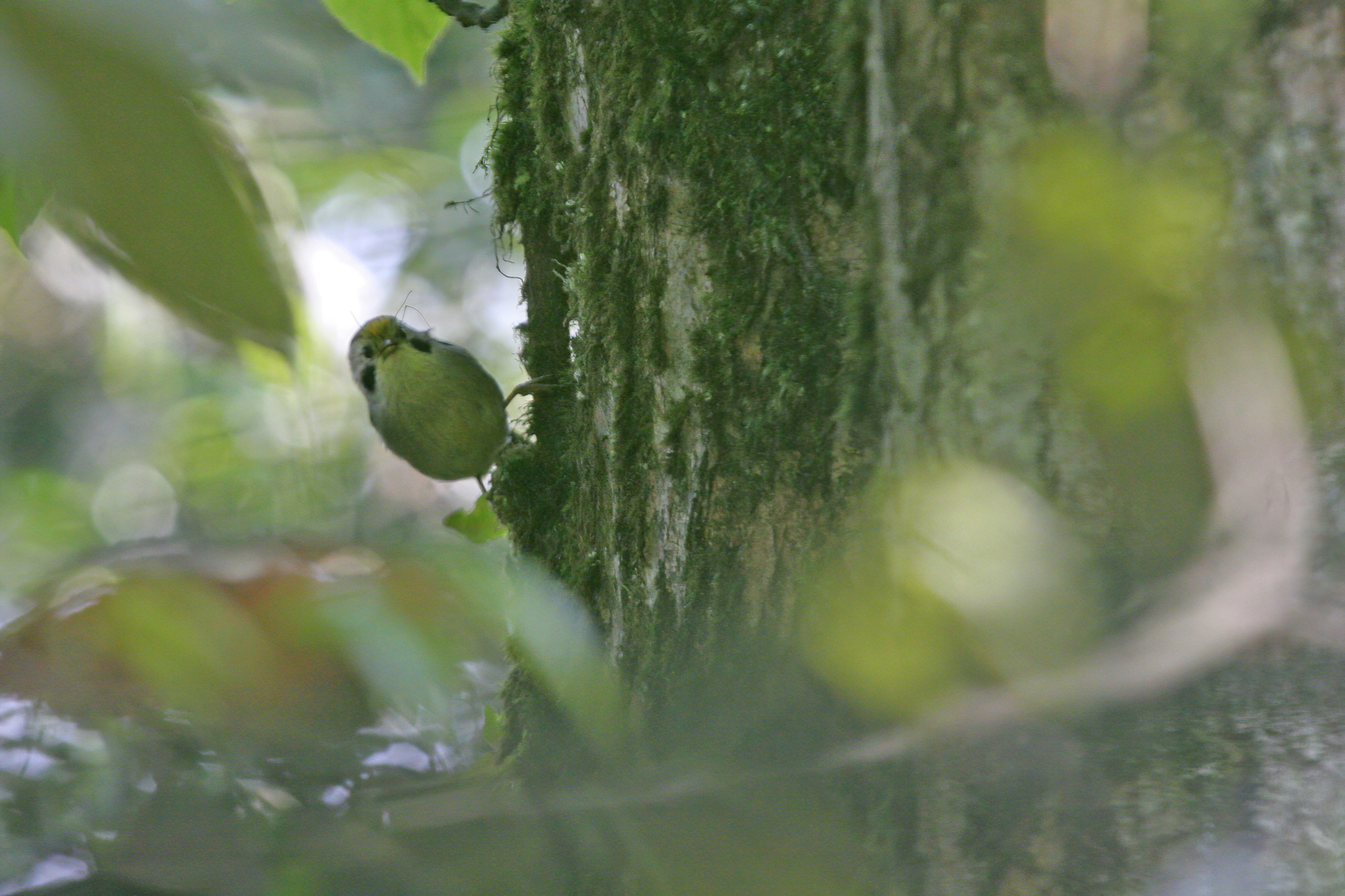

Conservation status
- Vulnerable (IUCN 3.1)

Scientific classification
- Kingdom: Animalia
- Phylum: Chordata
- Class: Aves
- Order: Passeriformes
- Family: Pellorneidae
- Genus: Schoeniparus
- Species: S. variegaticeps

Binomial name
- Schoeniparus variegaticeps (Yen, 1932)

Synonyms
- Alcippe variegaticeps Yen, 1932 Pseudominla variegaticeps (Yen, 1932)

= Golden-fronted fulvetta =

Species of bird

The golden-fronted fulvetta (Schoeniparus variegaticeps), also known as the gold-fronted fulvetta, is a species of bird in the family Pellorneidae. It is endemic to China. Its natural habitat is subtropical or tropical moist montane forest. It is threatened by habitat loss.
