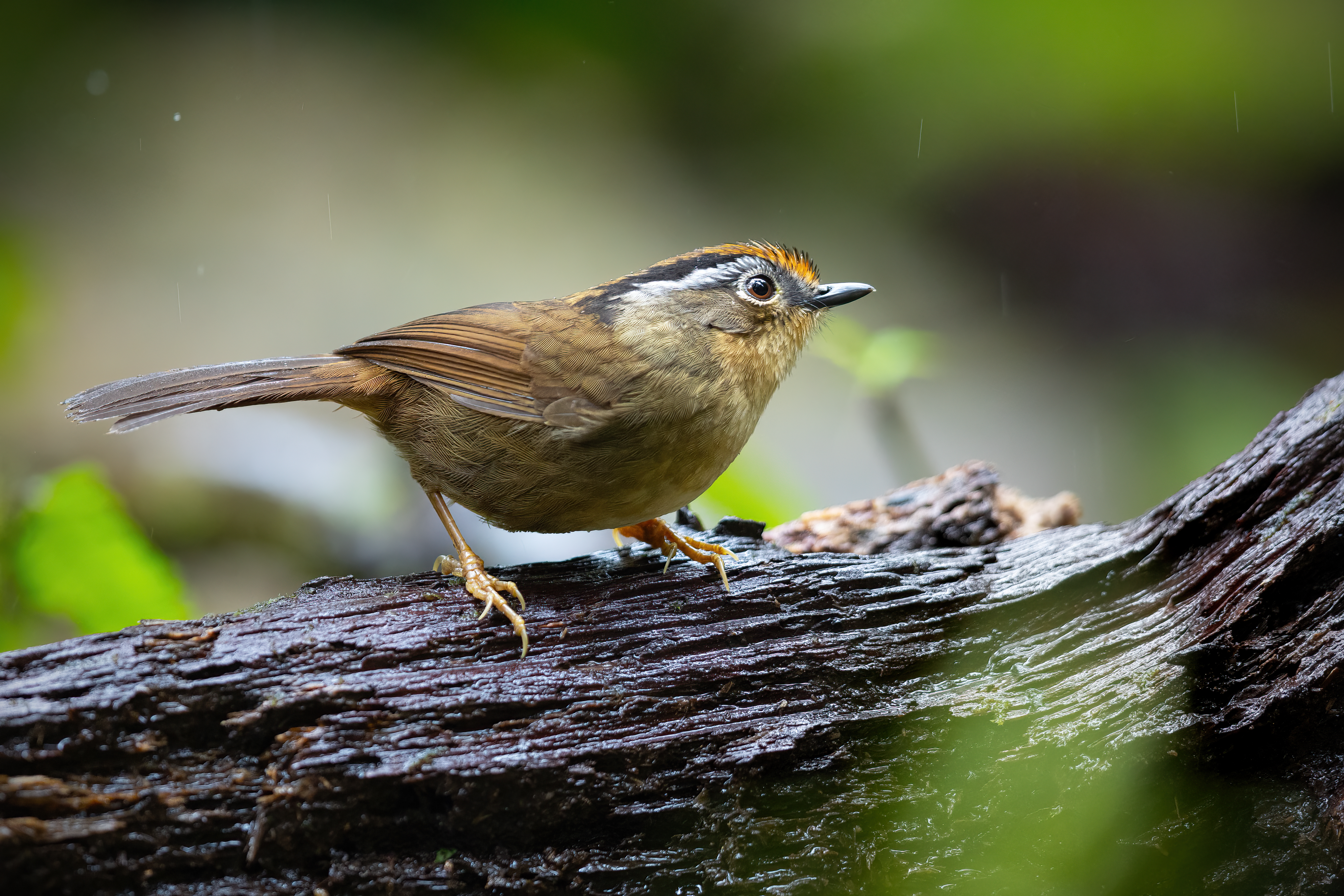

Conservation status
- Least Concern (IUCN 3.1)

Scientific classification
- Kingdom: Animalia
- Phylum: Chordata
- Class: Aves
- Order: Passeriformes
- Family: Pellorneidae
- Genus: Schoeniparus
- Species: S. dubius

Binomial name
- Schoeniparus dubius (Hume, 1874)

Synonyms
- Alcippe dubia

= Rusty-capped fulvetta =

Species of bird

The rusty-capped fulvetta (Schoeniparus dubius) is a species of bird in the family Pellorneidae. It is found in Bhutan, China, India, Laos, Myanmar, and Vietnam. Its natural habitat is subtropical or tropical moist montane forest.

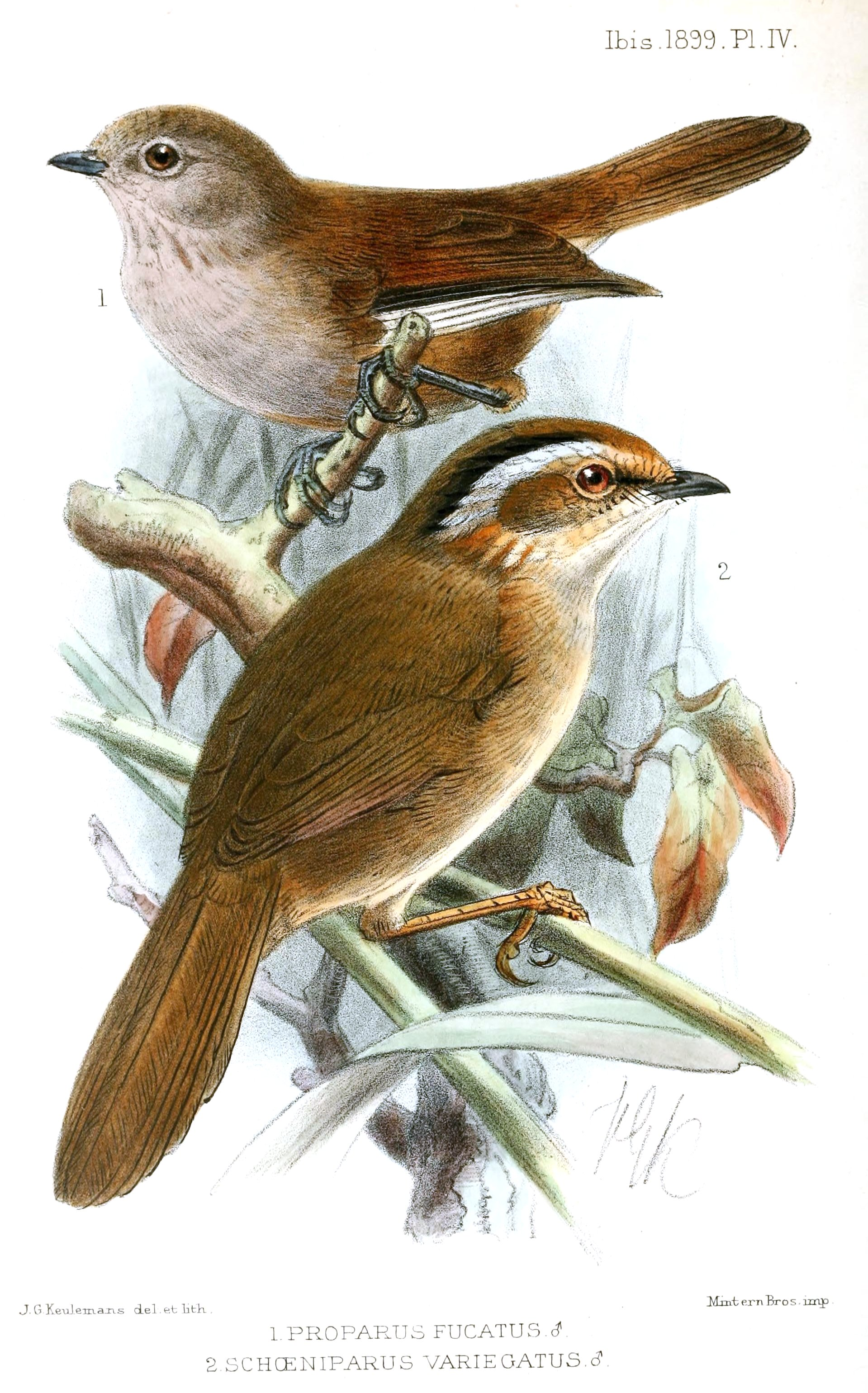
Rusty-capped fulvetta (foreground) with Fulvetta cinereiceps.
