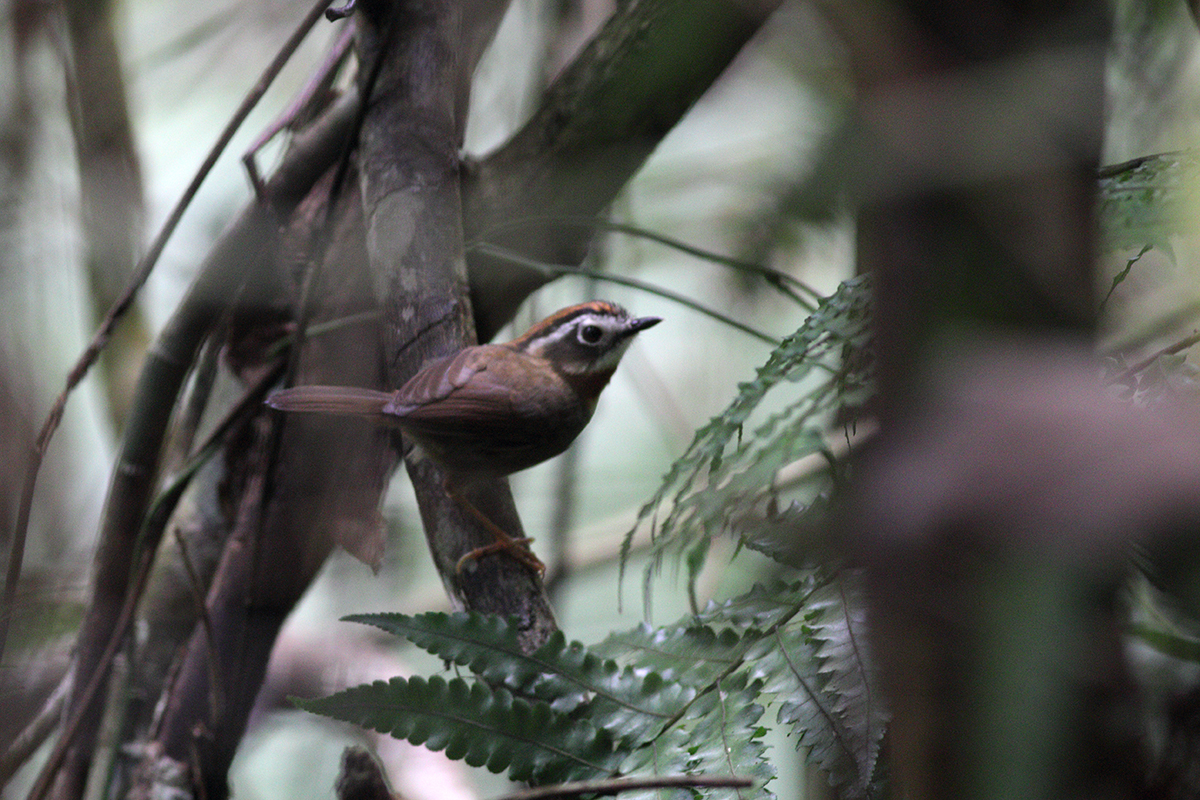
- From Dehing Patkai Wildlife Sanctuary, Assam, India

Conservation status
- Least Concern (IUCN 3.1)

Scientific classification
- Kingdom: Animalia
- Phylum: Chordata
- Class: Aves
- Order: Passeriformes
- Superfamily: Sylvioidea
- Family: Pellorneidae
- Genus: Schoeniparus
- Species: S. rufogularis

Binomial name
- Schoeniparus rufogularis (Mandelli, 1873)

Synonyms
- Minla Rufogularis (protonym)

= Rufous-throated fulvetta =

Species of bird

The rufous-throated fulvetta (Schoeniparus rufogularis) is a species of bird in the family Pellorneidae. It is found in southeastern Asia from the Himalayas through Indochina to southwestern Cambodia.

Its natural habitat is subtropical or tropical moist lowland forest.

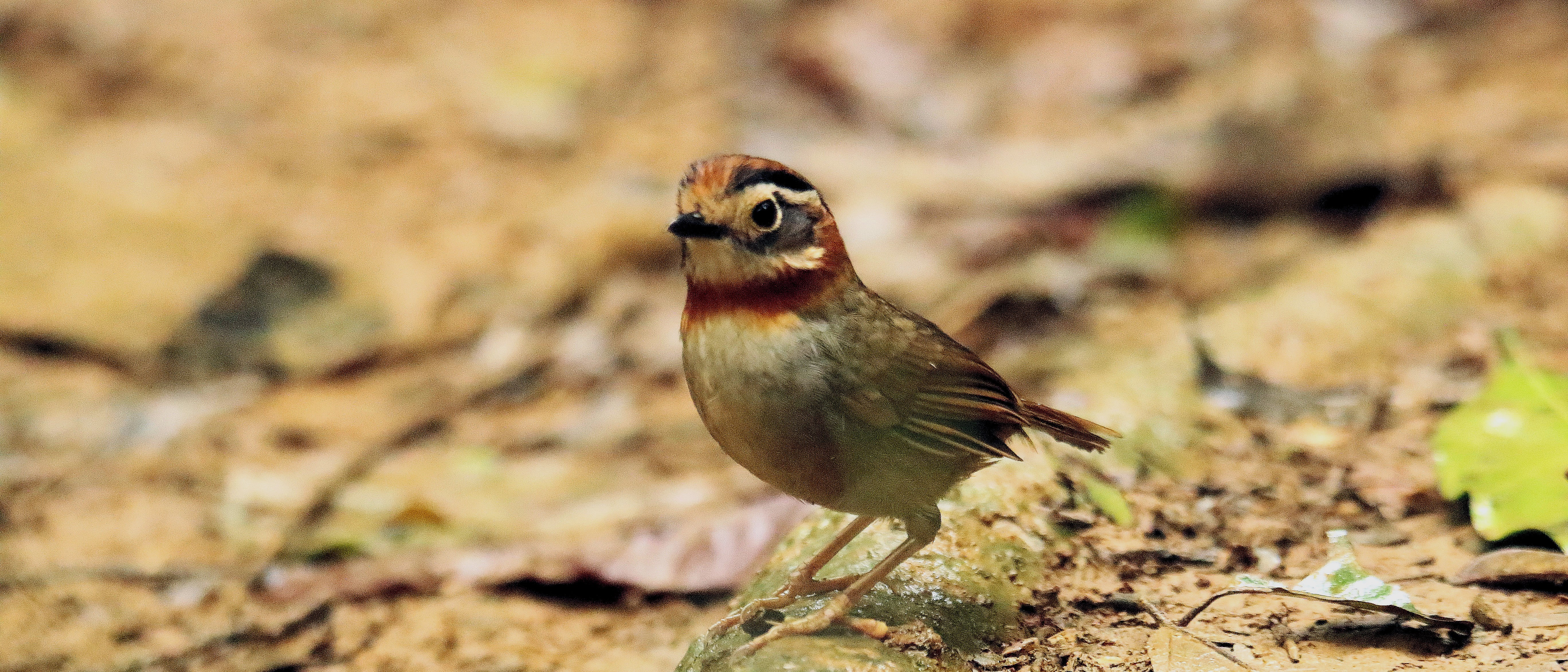
Rufous-throated fulvetta
