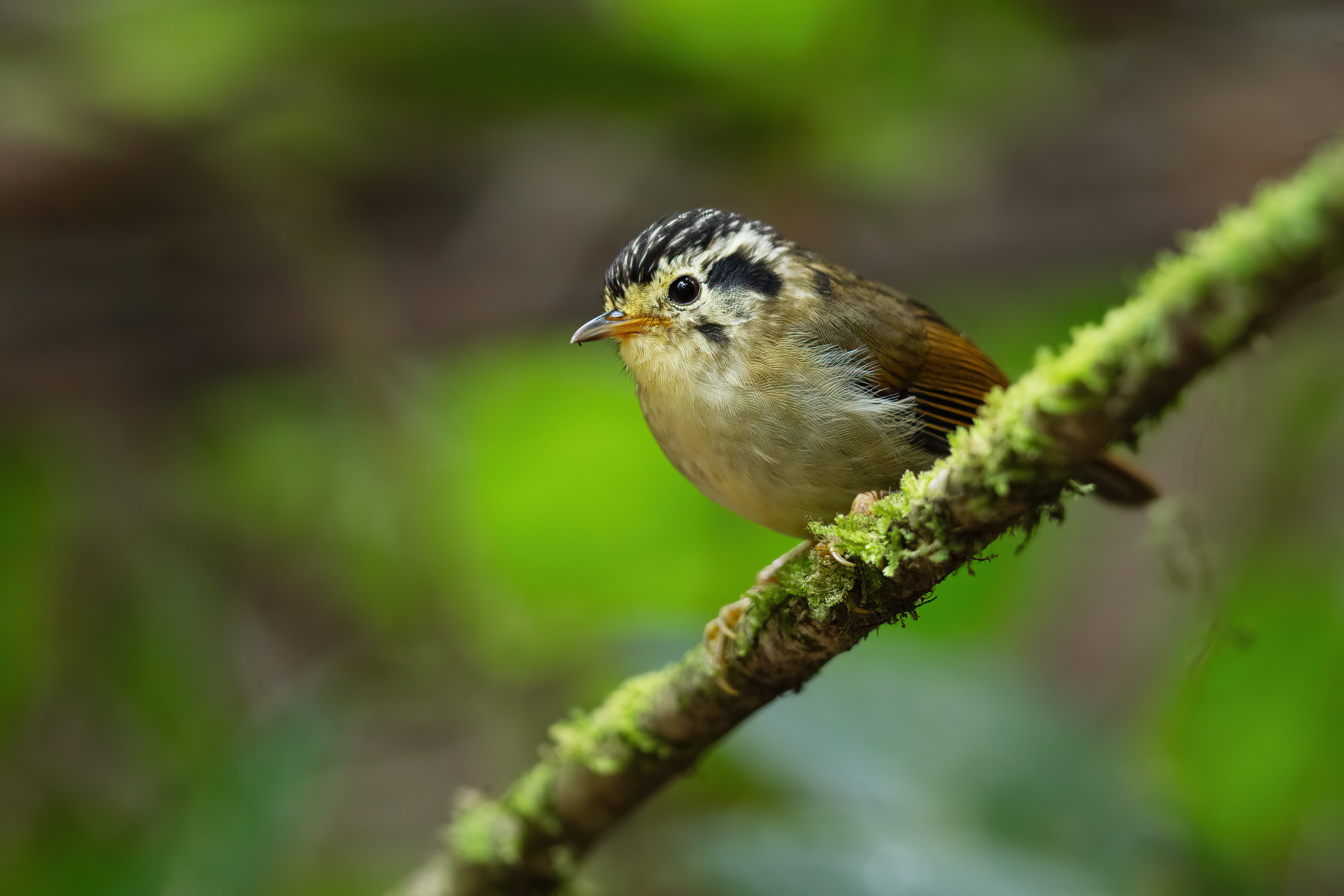

Conservation status
- Least Concern (IUCN 3.1)

Scientific classification
- Kingdom: Animalia
- Phylum: Chordata
- Class: Aves
- Order: Passeriformes
- Family: Pellorneidae
- Genus: Schoeniparus
- Species: S. klossi

Binomial name
- Schoeniparus klossi (Delacour & Jabouille, 1931)

Synonyms
- Alcippe klossi Pseudominla klossi

= Black-crowned fulvetta =

Species of bird

The black-crowned fulvetta (Schoeniparus klossi) is a bird species in the family Pellorneidae. Until recently it was considered a sub-species of the rufous-winged fulvetta. It is endemic to Vietnam.
