= Chancey (surname) =

Chancey is a surname, and may refer to:

- Blake Chancey (born 1962), American record producer and music business executive
- Robert Chancey (born 1972), American football player
- Robert E. Lee Chancey (1880–1948), American lawyer and politician from Florida
- Ron Chancey (born 1935), record producer
- Tina Chancey, multi-instrumentalist string player
- Vincent Chancey (born 1950), American jazz hornist

== See also ==
- Chance (surname)
