= Dusky fulvetta =

- S. b. brunneus, Taiwan

Conservation status
- Least Concern (IUCN 3.1)

Scientific classification
- Kingdom: Animalia
- Phylum: Chordata
- Class: Aves
- Order: Passeriformes
- Family: Pellorneidae
- Genus: Schoeniparus
- Species: S. brunneus

Binomial name
- Schoeniparus brunneus (Gould, 1863)

Synonyms
- Alcippe brunnea

Species of bird

The dusky fulvetta (Schoeniparus brunneus) is a species of bird in the family Pellorneidae. It is found in China and Taiwan, at altitudes mostly from 400–1,900 metres but sometimes down to sea level. Its natural habitat is low scrub in temperate forest and subtropical or tropical moist lowland forest.

It is a small bird, 13–13.5 cm long, with uniform brown wings and tail, a rufous to orangey-brown crown bordered by fine black lines on the side of the head, grey cheeks and breast, and a whitish throat edged with narrow black moustachial lines; the belly is pale grey to whitish. The bill is slender and blackish, the legs orangey-brown.

Five subspecies are accepted:

- Schoeniparus brunneus olivaceus (Styan, FW, 1896) — south-central China (Hubei, southern Shaanxi, Guizhou, and southeastern Sichuan)
- Schoeniparus brunneus weigoldi Stresemann, EFT, 1923 — central and eastern Sichuan (west-central China)
- Schoeniparus brunneus argutus (Hartert, EJO, 1910) — Hainan (southern China)
- Schoeniparus brunneus superciliaris (David, A, 1874) — southeastern China (Anhui to Guangxi, Fujian, and Guangdong)
- Schoeniparus brunneus brunneus (Gould, J, 1863) — Taiwan
