= Mark Chance =

American chemist

Mark Chance is an American chemist currently interested in structural and cellular proteomics. He is currently the Charles W. and Iona A. Mathias Professor of Cancer Research at Case Western Reserve University.

Chance was elected a fellow of the American Association for the Advancement of Science for his contributions to advancements in structural biology and chemistry. He served as Vice Dean for Research in the Case Western Reserve University School of Medicine from 2011 to late 2021. He also established the Center for Synchrotron Biosciences in 1994 to facilitate access to structural biology resources at Brookhaven National Laboratory; the center was awarded second prize in the 2017 Sharing Research Resources Award by the American Association of Medical Colleges (AAMC).
