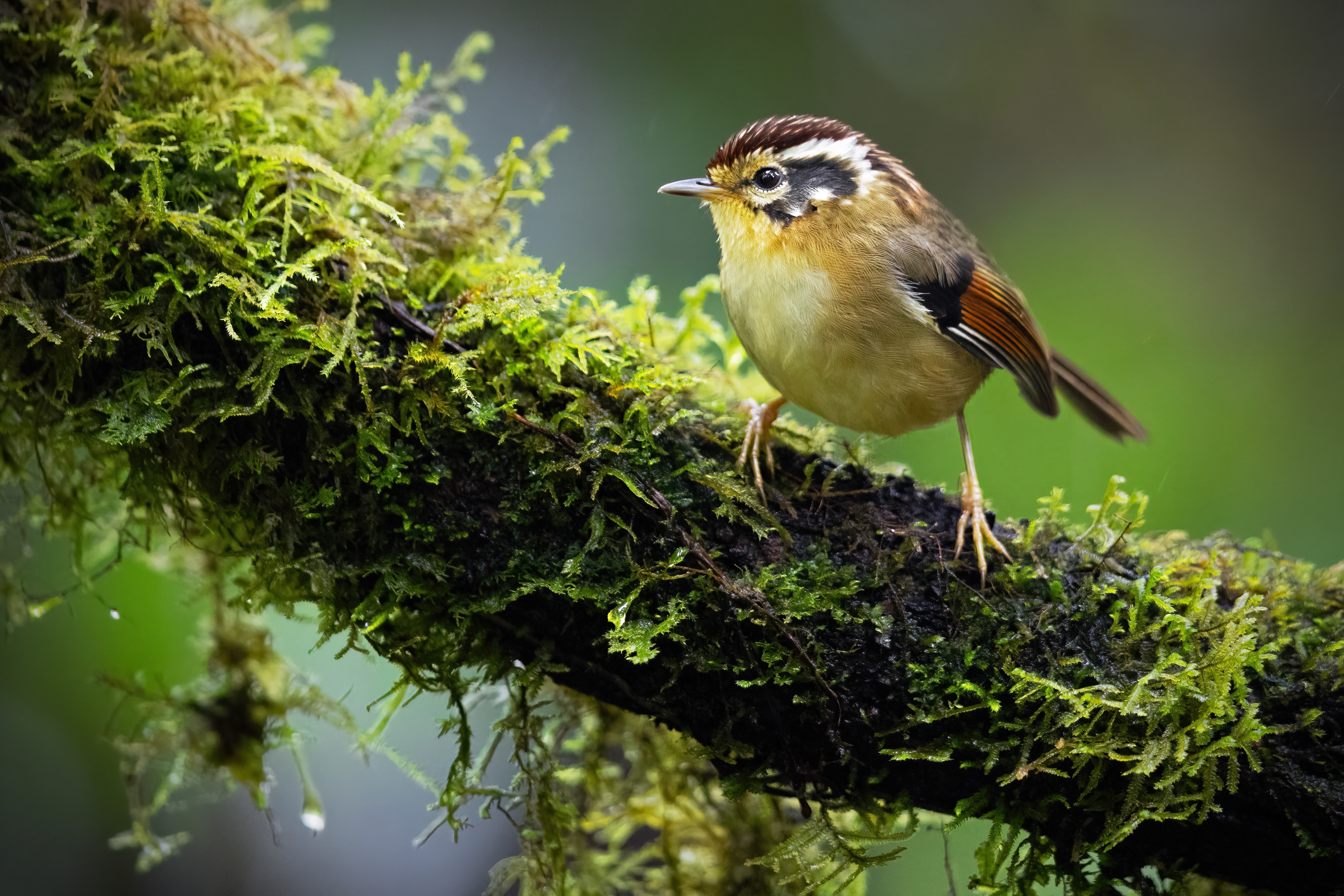
- in Vietnam

Conservation status
- Least Concern (IUCN 3.1)

Scientific classification
- Kingdom: Animalia
- Phylum: Chordata
- Class: Aves
- Order: Passeriformes
- Family: Pellorneidae
- Genus: Schoeniparus
- Species: S. castaneceps

Binomial name
- Schoeniparus castaneceps (Hodgson, 1837)

Synonyms
- Alcippe castaneceps Pseudominla castaneceps

= Rufous-winged fulvetta =

Species of bird

The rufous-winged fulvetta (Schoeniparus castaneceps) is a bird species of the family Pellorneidae. Its common name is misleading, because it is not a close relative of the "typical" fulvettas, which are now in the genus Fulvetta.

The black-crowned fulvetta (S. klossi) was until recently included here as a subspecies.

This 11 cm long bird has a dark-streaked chestnut crown, white supercilium, brown upperparts and pale underparts. The wings show a striking contrast between the bright rufous primaries and the black coverts.

This is a noisy species with a rich warbled ti-du-di-du-di-du-di-du song and wheezy tsi-tsi-tsi-tsi call.

It is common in evergreen montane forests above 1200 m ASL, often feeding on vertical trunks.

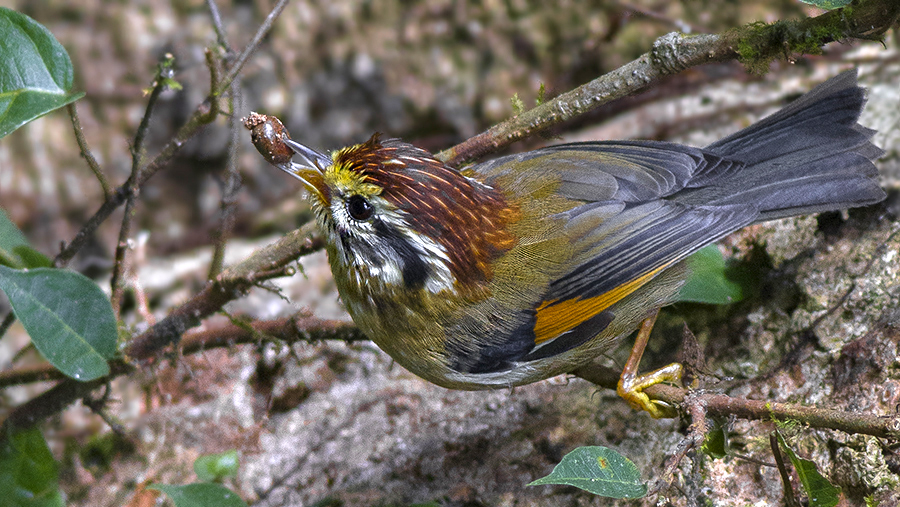
Rufous-winged fulvetta from Khangchendzonga Biosphere Reserve, West Sikkim
