= Edgar Chance =

British businessman, ornithologist and oologist (1881-1955)

Edgar Percival Chance
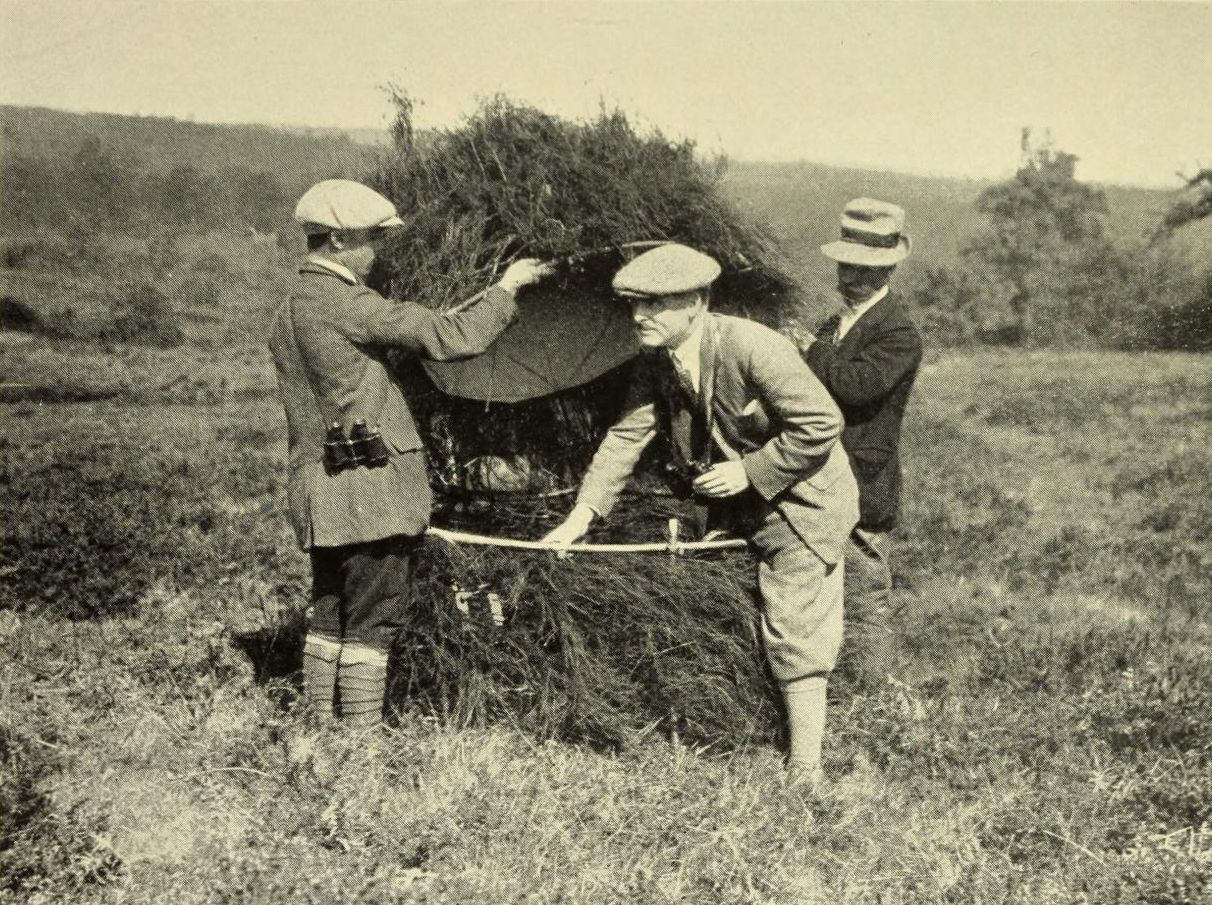
- Chance entering a hide
- Born: 1881; Edgbaston, Birmingham, England
- Died: 24 October 1955 (aged 73–74)
- Other name: Cuckoo Chance
- Education: Trinity College, Cambridge
- Known for: Study of the common cuckoo
- Parents: Alexander Macomb Chance (father); Florence Mercer (mother)
- Relatives: Kenneth Macomb Chance (brother)

Edgar Percival Chance (1881–1955) was a British businessman, ornithologist and oologist who amassed a collection of 25,000 birds' eggs. He is noted for his pioneering studies on the parasitic breeding behaviour of the common cuckoo (Cuculus canorus).

== Life ==
Chance was born at Edgbaston, in the city of Birmingham, the son of Alexander Macomb Chance and Florence Mercer.

He was educated at Trinity College, Cambridge. He was a wealthy businessman and industrialist who managed the family chemicals business, Chance and Hunt, based in Oldbury, West Midlands, which provided chemicals to Chance Brothers, the famous glassmakers based in Smethwick, Birmingham, between the first and second world wars. He was an egg-collector who became fascinated by cuckoos and made intensive studies of the common cuckoo, in the course of which he wrote two books about the species as well as producing a film. The film, The Cuckoo's Secret, was shot at Pound Green Common in Worcestershire, showing for the first time that female cuckoos lay their eggs directly into the nests of their hosts, rather than laying them on the ground and placing them in the nests with their bills as was previously widely believed. He also achieved a world record for collecting the most eggs – 25 – from a single female cuckoo in the course of one breeding season (1922).

Chance was a member of the British Ornithologists' Union – from which his egg collecting eventually resulted in his expulsion – and served on the Council of the British Oological Association. He named his daughter Cardamine, alluding to the scientific name of the cuckoo flower Cardamine pratensis.

Professor Nick Davies of Cambridge University has described Chance as one of his all time heroes and featured Chance's contribution to science in his book Cuckoo.

Chance's large egg collection, which includes the eggs of the cuckoo filmed at Pound Green Common, is held at the Natural History Museum at Tring.

Chance died at his home, age 74, on 24 October 1955.

== Family ==
Chance's fraternal grandmother was Cornelia de Peyster, whose ancestors were Dutch and Huguenot settlers in British North America and Loyalist to the Crown.

Edgar Chance's elder brother Kenneth Macomb Chance, Sheriff of Warwickshire in 1948 and founder of British Industrial Plastics, was also a keen egg-collector, forming between 1925 and 1938 a complete collection of Warwickshire birds' eggs which is now in the possession of his grandson.

== Publications ==
=== Books ===
- 1922 – The Cuckoo's Secret. Sidgwick and Jackson: London.
- 1940 – The Truth About the Cuckoo. Country Life: London.

=== Articles ===
Among Chance's many articles in the ornithological literature are:

- "Observations On the Cuckoo" (PDF). British Birds. 12: 182–184. 1919.
  - "abbreviated from an article on the same subject which appeared in Country Life for October 26th, 1918, pp. 354-5."
- "Observations On the Cuckoo" (PDF). British Birds. 13: 90–95. 1920.
- "A Third Season's Observations On a Cuckoo" (PDF). British Birds. 14: 218–232. 1921. Archived from the original (PDF) on 20 September 2021.
- "The Cuckoo's Egg Laying". The Auk. 40 (1): 181–182. January 1923. doi:10.2307/4073755. JSTOR 4073755.
- with Hann, Harry W. (July 1942). "The European Cuckoo and the Cowbird". Bird-Banding. XIII (3): 99–103. doi:10.2307/4509742. JSTOR 4509742.

=== Films ===
- 1922 – Secrets of Nature: The Cuckoo's Secret. Producer: Edgar Chance. Director of Photography: Oliver Pike. Released by British Instructional Films (BIF). 'The Cuckoo's Secret' is available on the BFI DVD 'Secrets of Nature', released in 2010.
