= Thomas Williams Chance =

Cardiff Baptist minister (1872–1954)

Thomas Williams Chance (1872–1954) was a Welsh Baptist minister and principal at Cardiff Baptist College.

== Life ==
Chance was born in Cardiff. Leaving school young to work, he was a mature student at the Glasbury school run by Daniel Christmas Lloyd, and passed into Cardiff University College in 1894.

Chance was a member of Albany Road Church in Cardiff and was chairman of the city's Baptist Board for 21 years. From 1934 to 1935 he served as President of the East Glamorgan Baptist Association and he was also supportive of the missionary work of the Christian Endeavour Society.

Chance died in 1954 after an operation at Hereford County Hospital.

== Works ==
- The Life of Principal William Edwards, B.A., Ph.D., D.D., LL.D. (1934), biography of William Edwards (1848–1929), Welsh Baptist author and college head
