= Fred Chance =

American artist

Fred Chance is an American illustrator. He was active in the field of illustration for over fifty years in Philadelphia and New York. He created covers for Vogue magazine in the early 1930s and was still active in magazine cover work in the late 1980s. He was a good friend of George Withers, who did illustrations for the Saturday Evening Post, Collier's, Redbook, Blue Book, Good Housekeeping and The New York Times.

== Sources ==
- The Nineteenth Annual Of Advertising Art, published by The Art Directors Club of New York, in 1940.
