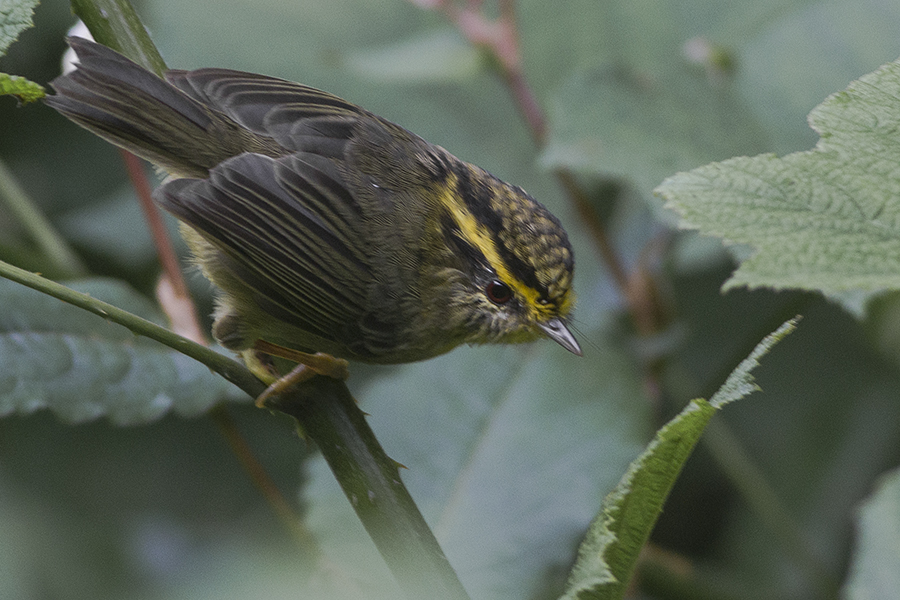
- From Khangchendzonga National Park in West Sikkim, India.

Conservation status
- Least Concern (IUCN 3.1)

Scientific classification
- Kingdom: Animalia
- Phylum: Chordata
- Class: Aves
- Order: Passeriformes
- Family: Pellorneidae
- Genus: Schoeniparus
- Species: S. cinereus

Binomial name
- Schoeniparus cinereus (Blyth, 1847)

Synonyms
- Alcippe cinerea Pseudominla cinerea

= Yellow-throated fulvetta =

Species of bird

The yellow-throated fulvetta (Schoeniparus cinereus) is a species of bird in the family Pellorneidae. Its common name is misleading, because it is not a close relative of the "typical" fulvettas, which are now in the family Paradoxornithidae.

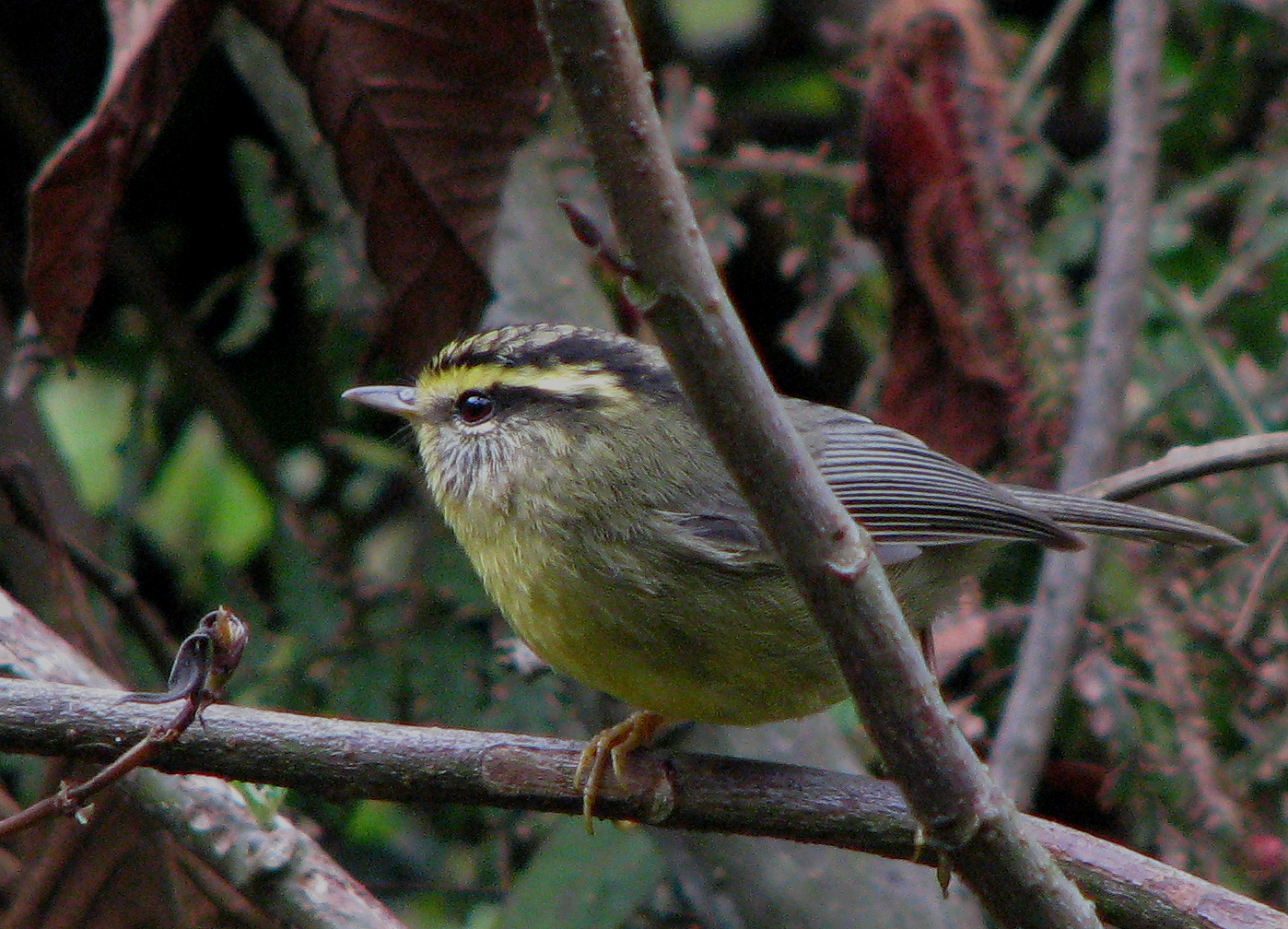
From Eaglenest Wildlife Sanctuary in Arunachal Pradesh, India.

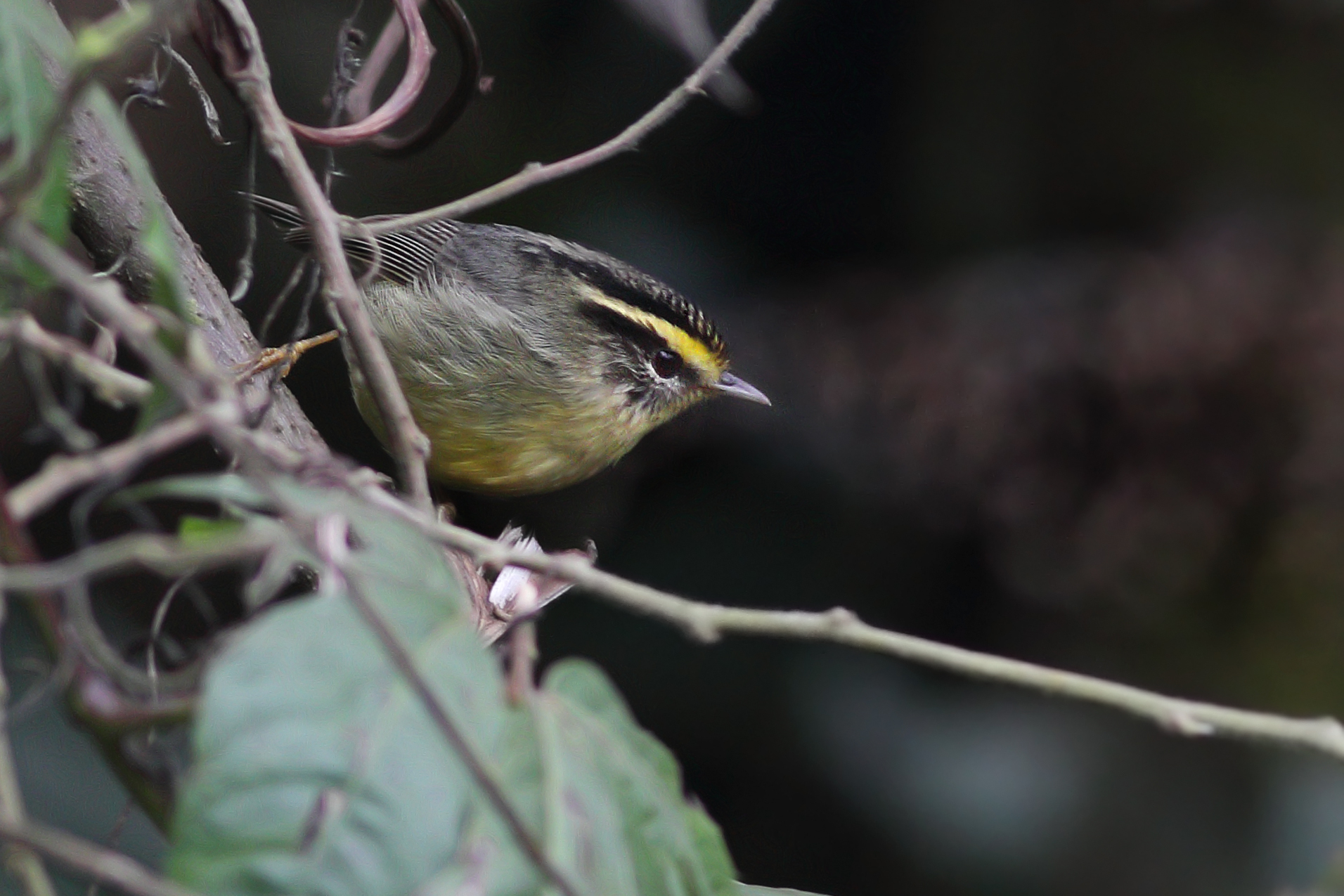
From Eaglenest Wildlife Sanctuary in Arunachal Pradesh, India.

It is found in south-eastern Asia from the Himalayas to north-central Vietnam. Its natural habitat is subtropical or tropical moist montane forests.
