= Nancy Laird Chance =

American pianist and composer (born 1931)

- Born: March 19, 1931 (age 94)
- Occupations: Pianist; composer

Nancy Laird Chance (born March 19, 1931) is an American pianist and composer. She studied at Bryn Mawr College from 1949 to 1950 and Columbia University from 1959 to 1967 with Vladimir Ussachevsky, Otto Luening and Chou Wen-chung.

After completing her studies, Chance worked as a piano teacher, composer and arts administrator. She received the ASCAP/Nissim prize for orchestral composition in 1981 for Liturgy and in 1984 for Odysseus. She also received two awards from the NEA, and fellowships from the MacDowell Colony and Sundance Film for composition in 1988. Her works have been performed at venues such as the Lincoln Center for the Performing Arts and Carnegie Hall. Laird Chance lived and taught in Kenya from 1974-1978.

== Works ==
Selected works include:

- Liturgy, for orchestra, 1979
- Odysseus, suite for orchestra, 1983
- Planasthai, for orchestra, 1991
- Darksong, for chamber ensemble, 1972
- Edensong, for chamber ensemble, 1973
- Daysongs, for chamber ensemble, 1974
- Ritual Sounds, for chamber ensemble, 1975
- Ceremonial, for chamber ensemble, 1976
- Declamation and Song, for chamber ensemble, 1977
- Duos II, oboe, English horn, 1978
- Duos III, violin, violincello, 1980
- Exultation and Lament, sax, timpany, 1980
- Solemnities, 1981
- Woodwind Quintet, 1983
- Rhapsodia, 1984
- String Quartet, no.1, 1984–5
- Elegy, string orchestra, 1986
- Heat and Silence, 1989
- Domine, Dominus, motet, double chorus unaccompanied, 1964
- Odysseus, chorus and orchestra, 1981–3
- In Paradisium, 1986–7, chorus and chamber ensemble, 1987
- Pie Jesu, Libera me, Hosanna and Benedictus, chorus and chamber ensemble, 1990
- 3 Rilke Songs, Soprano, flute, English horn, violincello, 1966
- Duos I, Soprano, flute, 1975
- Say the Good Words, violin, synth, 1989
- Last Images, film, 1988

Her music has been recorded and issued on CD by Opus One.
