= George Chance (photographer) =

New Zealand pictorialist photographer

George Chance (15 May 1885 – 28 September 1963) was a New Zealand pictorialist photographer active in the early 20th century. He is best known for his photographs of landscape and rural scenes produced during the 1920s and 1930s.

== Early life ==
Chance was born on 15 May 1885, in Liverpool, England. He took his first photographs at the age of 12, with a three-penny pinhole camera. Later, his father would give him a Thornton-Pickard half-plate camera. In 1901, the young Chance joined Houghtons Limited, a photography supplier, as a showroom demonstrator. His next job was as a photography tutor for The London Stereoscopic Company of Regent Street, around 1904. In this position he taught photography to a number of notable figures of the time, including Winston Churchill, George Bernard Shaw, Francis Greville, 5th Earl of Warwick, Prince Vajiravudh (then the Crown Prince of Siam), Lord Curzon, Lord Roberts and W.S. Gilbert.

In 1905, Chance was the photographer on an ill-fated expedition to recover the Cocos Island Treasure, which apparently led to him being present for an unspecified "revolution" in Ecuador as well as an earthquake, events which supplied him with a supply of adventurous anecdotes later in his life.

== Career ==
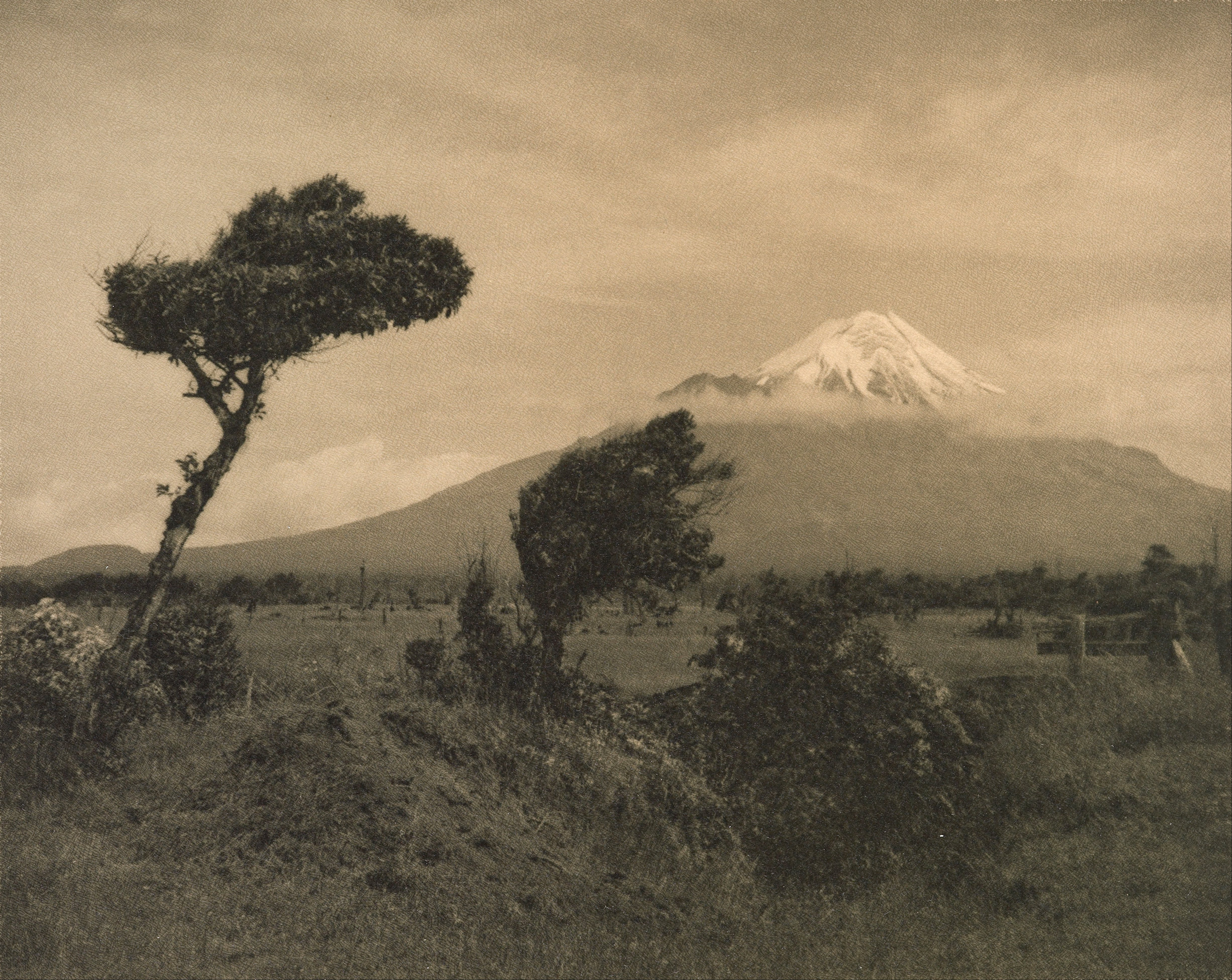
Mount Egmont, circa 1925

Chance emigrated to New Zealand in 1909, by which time he was a qualified optometrist, and was employed by Dawson's Limited of Dunedin. He became the president of the Dunedin Optical Association in 1913, and joined the Dunedin Photographic Society in 1917. By 1919, Chance was exhibiting his photographs to some critical success, and continued to build his practice over the following decades, eventually going on to become a household name in New Zealand. Chance claimed at one point to have sold over 30,000 photographs both within New Zealand and overseas.

== Style ==
Chance was amongst the first photographers to import pictorialism to New Zealand, after being influenced by the work of Alfred Horsley Hinton and the Linked Ring group. Chance's photographic style is in keeping with the pictorialist ethos, which sought to elevate photography to the status of fine art by adopting a deliberately "painterly" technique and subject matter. Many of his works contain trees, a subject for which he had a special fondness. In addition to landscapes, Chance also photographed scenes of rural life, portraits and architectural subjects in Dunedin and Christchurch.

== Legacy ==
Chance's work is significant because it represents an early example of New Zealand photography being treated as fine art; prior to the turn of the century, photographers such as the Burton Brothers and George Valentine mainly produced images as souvenirs for the tourist trade or as family keepsakes, not as art objects in their own right.
