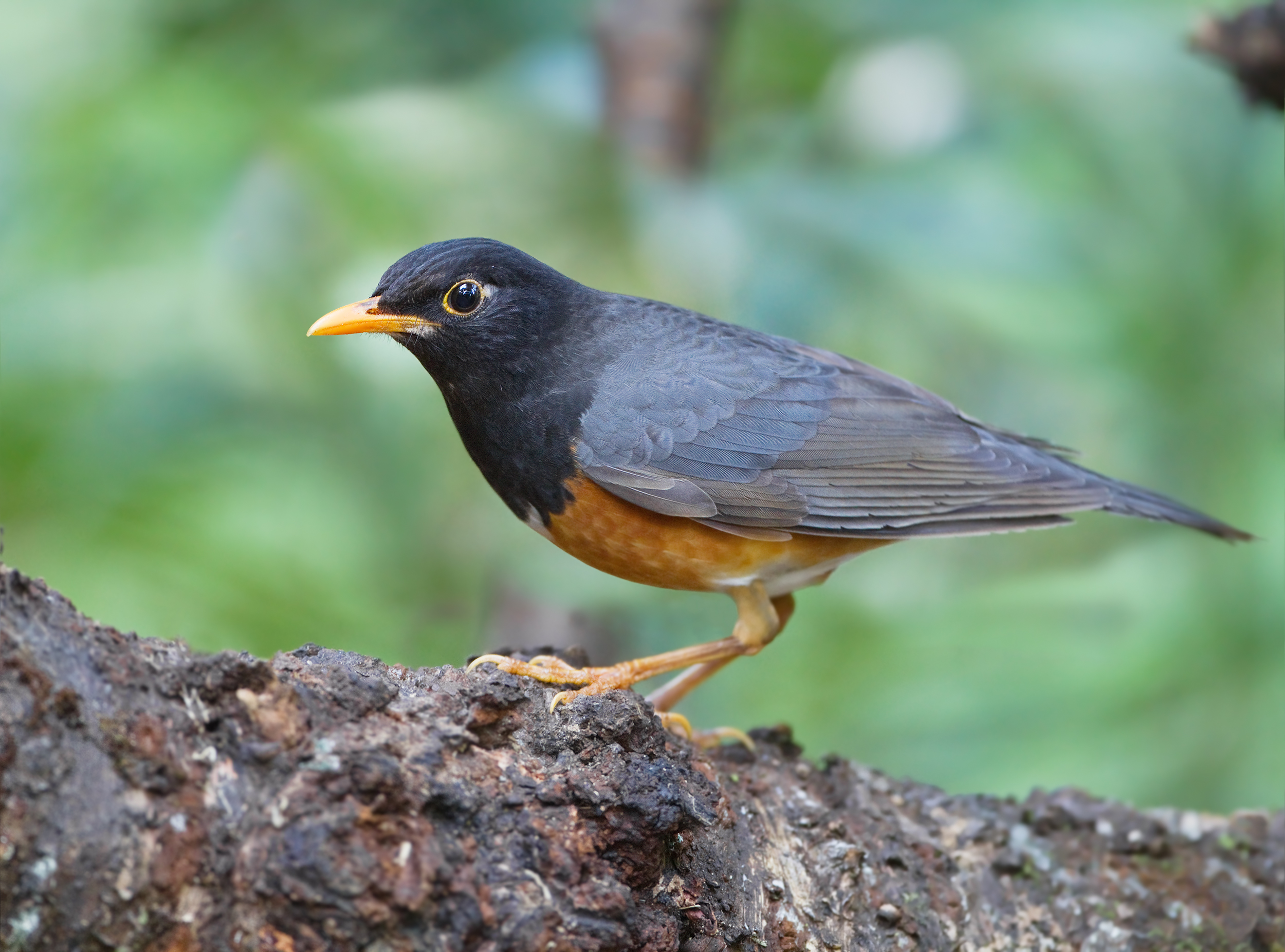
- Male
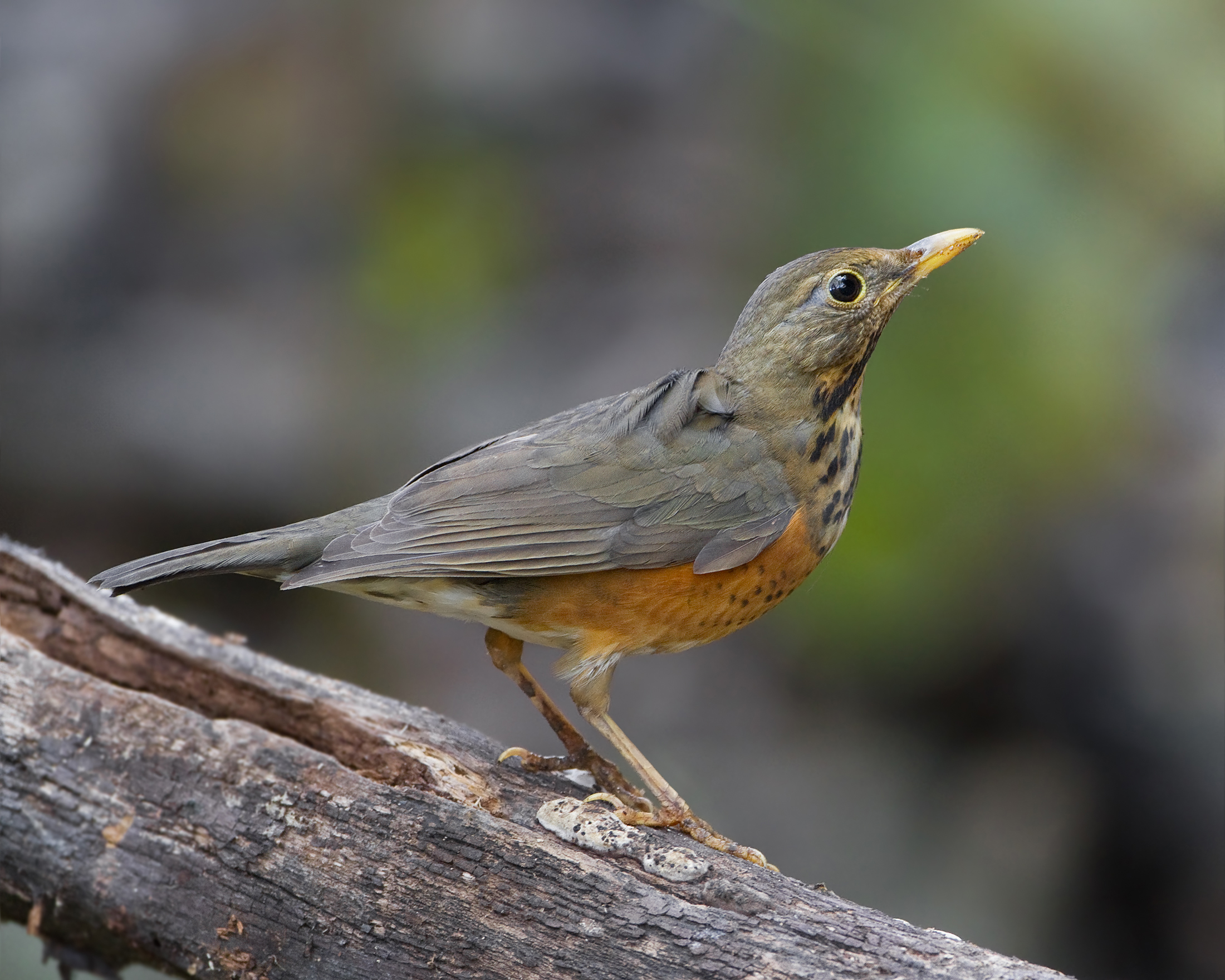
- Female

Conservation status
- Least Concern (IUCN 3.1)

Scientific classification
- Kingdom: Animalia
- Phylum: Chordata
- Class: Aves
- Order: Passeriformes
- Family: Turdidae
- Genus: Turdus
- Species: T. dissimilis

Binomial name
- Turdus dissimilis Blyth, 1847

= Black-breasted thrush =

Species of bird

The black-breasted thrush (Turdus dissimilis) is a species of bird in the family Turdidae. It is found from north-eastern India to northern Vietnam. Although both male and female birds have the same colour on their lower parts, the upper section of males is mostly black in colour, while females are mostly grey-brown. Thus, the bird's common name refers to the colour of the male bird's breast. They tend to live in forests located at high altitude.

== Taxonomy ==
The black-breasted thrush belongs to the order Passeriformes and the family Turdidae. The species is a monotypic taxon – it has been hypothesized that it forms part of a larger superspecies, classified together with Tickell's thrush (T. unicolor) and the grey-backed thrush (T. hortulorum). It was previously thought to have conspecificity with the latter species of thrush. The black-breasted thrush was first described by Edward Blyth in 1847 and was found in the lower Bengal region.

== Description ==
The black-breasted thrush is 22 centimetres (8.7 in) to 23.5 centimetres (9.3 in) long in total, including its tail. Whereas the lower parts are the same colour for both sexes, the upper and middle parts are where they differ. For males, the section spanning from their head to the back of their neck and breast area is black, and the remaining areas at the top are slate gray. On the other hand, females are gray-brown from their eyes to their tail, and the section from their throat to their breast is a "diffused" shade of buff.

== Distribution and habitat ==
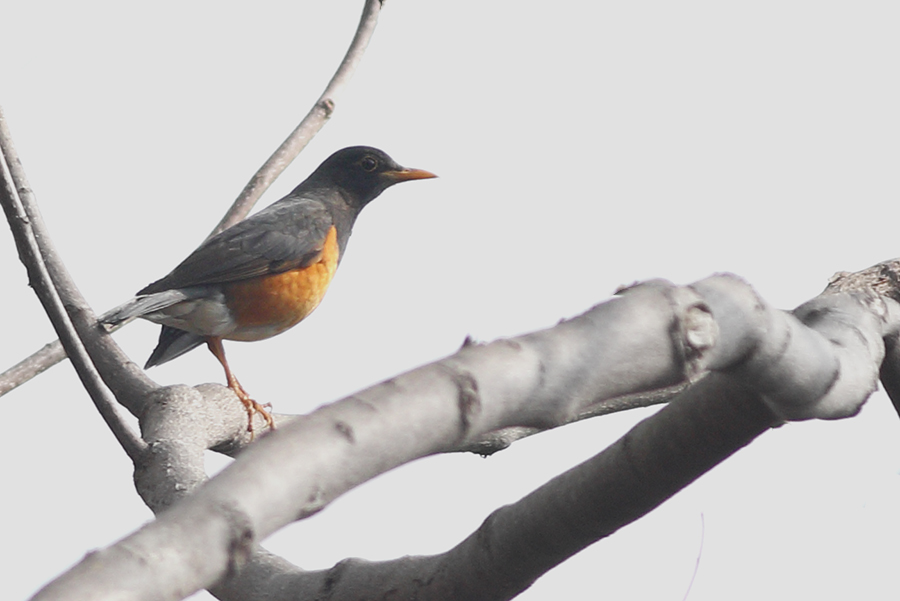
From Khonoma village, Nagaland, India.

The bird is found from north-eastern India to northern Vietnam. Their preferred habitats are tropical and subtropical montane forests that are moist. Other suitable habitats that are less important include tropical and subtropical dry forests – for native populations that are resident – as well as tropical/subtropical moist shrubland and mangroves located above the level of high tide. In southwestern China, these birds can also be found in hilly areas.

They are typically found at relatively high elevations of between 1,220 metres (4,000 ft) to 2,500 metres (8,200 ft) high. However, they tend to descend to lower altitudes during the winter at around 200 metres (660 ft).

The black-breasted thrush has been placed on the Least Concern category of the IUCN Red List, even though its population has been decreasing throughout the last ten years. This is because the reduction in the estimated population is not swift enough to merit Vulnerable status under the IUCN criterion for population trend, which is a decline of more than 30% in ten years or three generations The population decline has been attributed to continuing "destruction and degradation" of the bird's natural habitat. The size of its distribution range is over 752,000 square kilometres (290,000 sq mi).

== Behavior ==
The call of the black-breasted thrush has been described as "sweet mellow" and "melodious", with their musical phrases spanning 3–8 notes. They consume insects, molluscs and berries. The food they gather is usually from the ground, although they occasionally fly to fruit trees. Their time of breeding differs depending on the country in which they are situated. Black-breasted thrushes in India reproduce from April to July; those in Myanmar do so from April to June; in China, these birds mate from May until June.
