= Jean C. Chance =

Jean Chance
- Born: 1938 (age 87–88); Gainesville, Florida
- Education: University of Florida
- Known for: Chairwoman of the Hearst Awards Committee; University of Florida teaching and service awards; chaired UF faculty senate and Intercollegiate Athletics Committee

Jean C. Chance (born 1938) is an American academic.

She received her JM (1960) and MA (1969) from the University of Florida.

She has served as a member of the Hearst Awards Committee for 25 of those years, and was also the chairman as well. In addition Chance has been a faculty member at UF since 1969. She was a professor of Journalism until her retirement in 2003, and was inducted into the UF Hall of Fame and Independent Florida Alligator Hall of Fame; she served as chairwoman of the Campus Communications Inc. board and Gator Wesley Foundation board.
