= Kenneth Chance =

Kenneth Macomb Chance
- Born: 16 July 1879; Edgbaston, Birmingham, England
- Died: 9 January 1966 (aged 86)
- Education: Trinity College, Cambridge
- Occupation: Industrialist
- Relatives: Edgar Percival Chance (brother)

Kenneth Macomb Chance (16 July 1879 – 9 January 1966) was an English industrialist and founder of British Industrial Plastics, who served as Sheriff of Warwickshire.

Chance was born on 16 July 1879, at Edgbaston, Birmingham (then in Warwickshire), the son of Alexander Macomb Chance and Florence Mercer. Chance's fraternal grandmother was Cornelia de Peyster, whose ancestors were Dutch and Huguenot settlers in British North America and Loyalist to the Crown. He was educated at Bilton Grange School, Warwickshire, Repton School and Trinity College, Cambridge. While at Cambridge, he played cricket for Trinity College's Second XI

He served as director (from 1901), managing director (from 1906), and chairman (from 1933) of British Cyanides, and was MD & Chairman of its sister company British Industrial Plastics Ltd. He wrote a history of British Cyanides.

In 1944, he gave the Society Of Chemical Industry's first Chance Memorial Lecture, on the subject of his father.

He was Sheriff of Warwickshire in 1948–1949. At that time, his address was listed as Radford Manor, at Radford Semele, near Leamington Spa.

Chance was also a keen egg-collector, forming between 1925 and 1938 a complete collection of Warwickshire birds' eggs which is now in the possession of his grandson.

He died on 9 January 1966.

Kenneth Chance's younger brother was the industrialist and ornithologist Edgar Percival Chance.
