= Limestone wren-babbler =

Limestone wren-babbler has been split into three species:

- Annam limestone babbler, Gypsophila annamensis
- Rufous limestone babbler, Gypsophila calcicola
- Variable limestone babbler, Gypsophila crispifrons
