= Rufous-rumped grassbird =

Rufous-rumped grassbird has been split into two species:

- Indian grassbird, Graminicola bengalensis
- Chinese grassbird, Graminicola striatus
