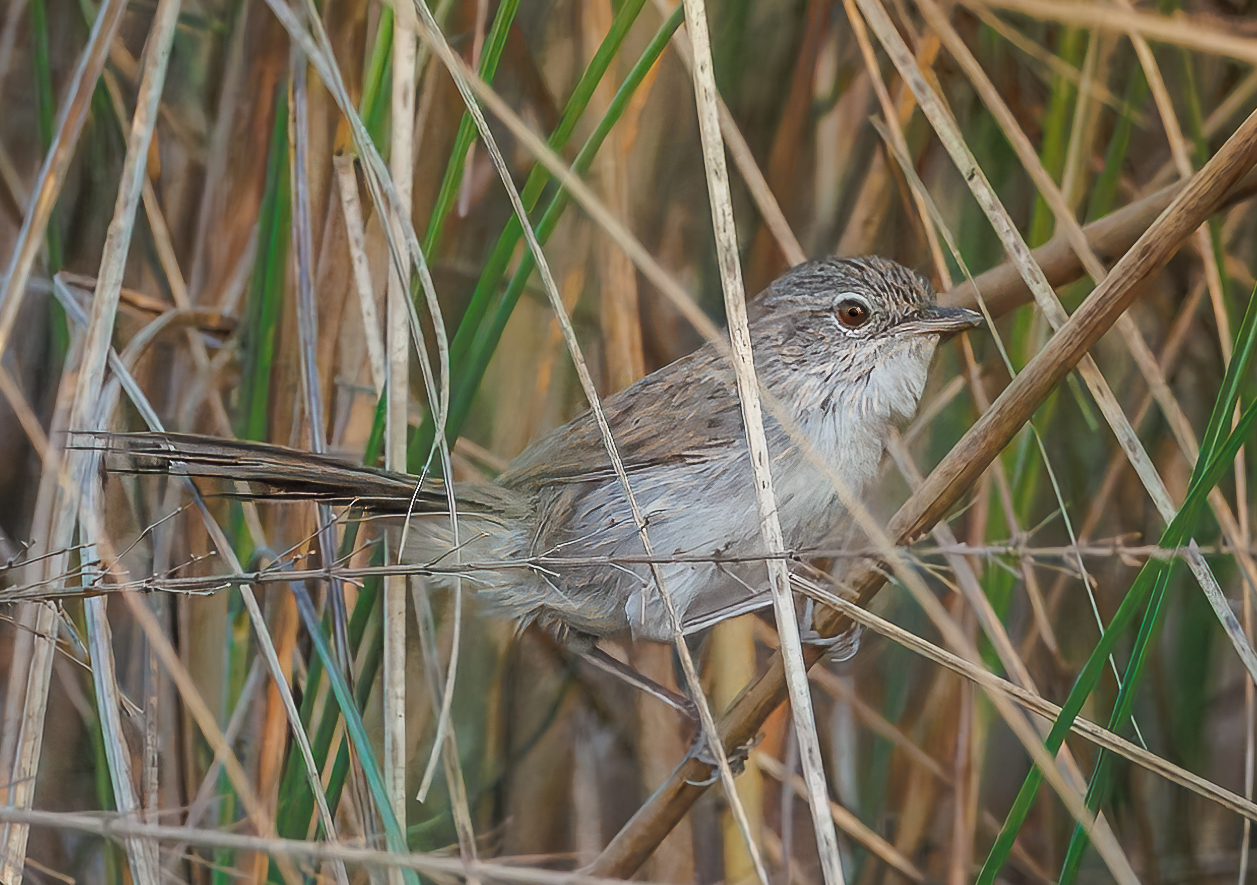

Conservation status
- Endangered (IUCN 3.1)

Scientific classification
- Kingdom: Animalia
- Phylum: Chordata
- Class: Aves
- Order: Passeriformes
- Family: Pellorneidae
- Genus: Laticilla
- Species: L. cinerascens

Binomial name
- Laticilla cinerascens (Walden, 1874)

= Swamp grass babbler =

Species of bird

The swamp grass babbler or swamp prinia (Laticilla cinerascens) is a small bird of the Indian subcontinent. Some authorities consider it a subspecies of the rufous-vented grass babbler.

== Range, habitat, and status ==
The swamp grass babbler occurs in the plains of the Brahmaputra and the Cachar district in the state of Assam, India, and in nearby parts of northern Bangladesh. It lives in a variety of habitats with tall grasses or brushes, notably plains of sarkhan (Saccharum) with or without scattered acacias and tamarisks, but also plains of elephant grass and ekra grass, and even deserts with scattered patches of tall grass, and reedbeds. It prefers areas near large rivers or swamps.

== Description ==
Swamp grass babblers average 17 cm (6.7 in) long (big for a prinia). Adults are olive-grey above, slightly warmer on the back of the neck and upper back, but less distinctly collared than the rufous-vented grass babbler. Bold dark streaking starts at the forehead and fades on the back. The underparts are greyish white, greyer on the flanks, which may be slightly streaked. There is a faint buff tint to the undertail coverts (but not the distinctive colouring for which the rufous-vented prinia is named). The upper surface of the wings has barring formed by the covert feathers and their paler fringes. The wing linings are a faintly tawny off-white. The flight feathers of the wings are greyish brown; when the wing is folded, the primaries barely extend beyond the tertials. Those of the tail may be greyish or olive-brown and have tawny tips. The tail is long and strongly graduated, that is, the outermost pair of feathers is only one-third as long as the central pair. The head shows a conspicuous white eye-ring, whitish lores, and dark-streaked whitish cheeks.

The upper mandible is horn-brown; the lower, straw-brown or flesh-brown. The eyes are brown, varying a little in lightness. The legs are flesh-colored or pale brown.

From July to September the plumage is worn, especially the tail, which may be much shorter than in fresh plumage and missing the tawny tips. The moult is usually complete by October.

Juveniles are similar but have loose, fluffy plumage. They have little or no streaking on the back and their tail tips are rufous, not tawny. They molt into adult head and body plumage, retaining their flight feathers, about 4 to 6 weeks after fledging.

Calls include "a wheezy feez, and a quiet, very rapid nasal rattle." The song is described as a warble about 4 seconds long, liquid and loud, comparable to that of a dunnock.

== Behavior ==
Like the rufous-vented grass babbler, this species skulks low in grass tussocks, hopping and threading its way through, often in small groups, feeding on insects. It usually holds its tail slightly cocked. When it flies, something that is hard to cause, it goes only to a nearby tussock. It is easiest to find in the breeding season, when it sings in the mornings and evenings.

== Classification ==
Some authorities lump it as a subspecies, L. burnesii cinerascens, of the rufous-vented grass babbler. Here it is treated as a separate species following the Handbook of the Birds of the World and Clements.
