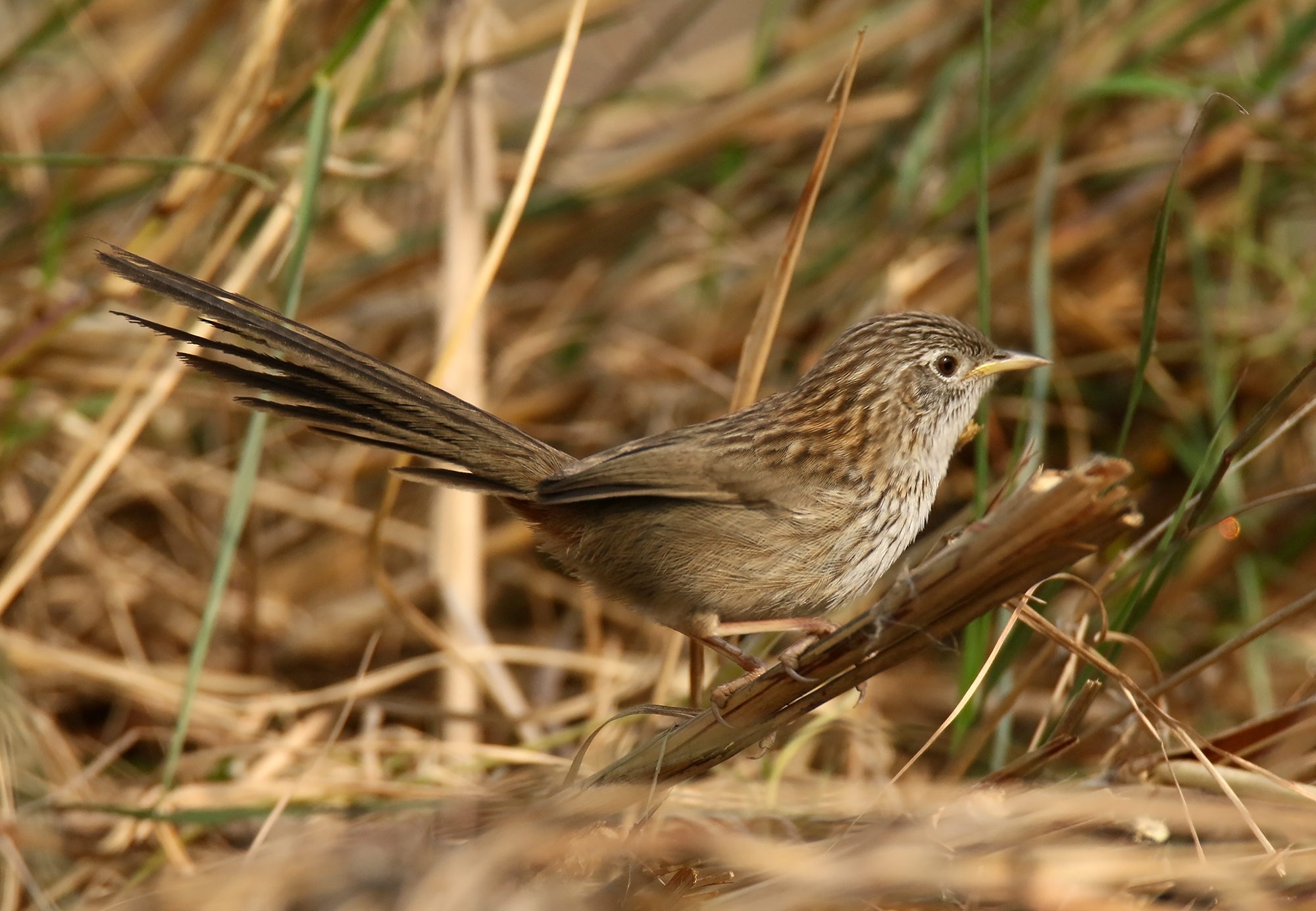

Conservation status
- Near Threatened (IUCN 3.1)

Scientific classification
- Kingdom: Animalia
- Phylum: Chordata
- Class: Aves
- Order: Passeriformes
- Family: Pellorneidae
- Genus: Laticilla
- Species: L. burnesii

Binomial name
- Laticilla burnesii (Blyth, 1844)

= Rufous-vented grass babbler =

Species of bird

The rufous-vented grass babbler or rufous-vented prinia (Laticilla burnesii) is a small warbler in the family Pellorneidae that occurs in Pakistan, northwestern India and Nepal.

== Taxonomy ==
The rufous-vented grass babbler was described by the English zoologist Edward Blyth in 1844 under the binomial name Eurycercus burnesii. It is named after Alexander Burnes.

Two subspecies are recognised:

- L. b. burnesii (Blyth, 1844) - Pakistan and northwest India
- L. b. nepalicola (Baral, Basnet, Chaudhary, B, Chaudhary, H, Giri & Som, 2008) - Nepal

== Description ==
Rufous-vented grass babblers average 17 cm (6.7 in) long with a wing length from the bend to the tip of 5.3 cm (2.1 in) (females) or 5.5 cm (2.2 in) (males) to 5.9 cm (2.3 in). Adults are a cool brown colour above except that a buffy region on the back of the neck and upper back forms a distinct collar. Bold dark streaking starts at the forehead and fades on the back. The underparts are whitish with a tawny hue and dark streaking on the flanks. The undertail coverts are bright rufous or chestnut. The upper surface of the wings has barring formed by the covert feathers and their paler fringes. The wing linings are a faintly tawny off-white. The flight feathers of the wings are greyish brown; when the wing is folded, the primaries barely extend beyond the tertials. Those of the tail may be greyish or olive-brown and have rufous tips. The tail is long 8.7 to 11.5 cm (3.4 to 4.5 in) and strongly graduated, that is, the outermost pair of feathers is only one-third as long as the central pair. The head shows a conspicuous white eye-ring, whitish lores, and dark-streaked whitish cheeks.

The upper mandible is horn-brown; the lower, straw-brown or flesh-brown. The eyes are brown, varying a little in lightness. The legs are flesh-colored or pale brown.

From July to September the plumage is worn, especially the tail, which may be much shorter than in fresh plumage and missing the rufous tips. The moult is usually complete by October.

Juveniles are similar but have loose, fluffy plumage. They have little or no streaking on the back and their tail tips are rufous, not tawny. They molt into adult head and body plumage, retaining their flight feathers, about 4 to 6 weeks after fledging.

Calls include "a wheezy feez, and a quiet, very rapid nasal rattle." The song is described as a warble about 4 seconds long, liquid and loud, comparable to that of a dunnock.

== Range and habitat ==
As treated here, this bird is found only in the plains of the Indus in Pakistan and adjacent in Punjab (India). (However, the swamp grass babbler of Assam and Bangladesh is often combined with this species.) It inhabits a variety of long grasslands, notably plains of sarkhan (Saccharum) but also plains of elephant grass and ekra grass, sometimes where mixed with acacias and tamarisks. It can even occur in deserts with scattered patches of tall grass, and reedbeds. It prefers the vicinity of large rivers and their tributaries or swamps.

== Behaviour ==
This species skulks low in grass tussocks, hopping and threading its way through, often in small groups, feeding on insects. It usually holds its tail slightly cocked. When it flies, something that is hard to cause, it goes only to a nearby tussock. It is easiest to find in the breeding season, when it sings in the mornings and evenings.

== Status ==
The conservation status of the rufous-vented grass babbler is rated at near threatened by the International Union for Conservation of Nature. It is locally common or abundant in the Punjab and northern Sindh but much rarer in southern Sindh.
