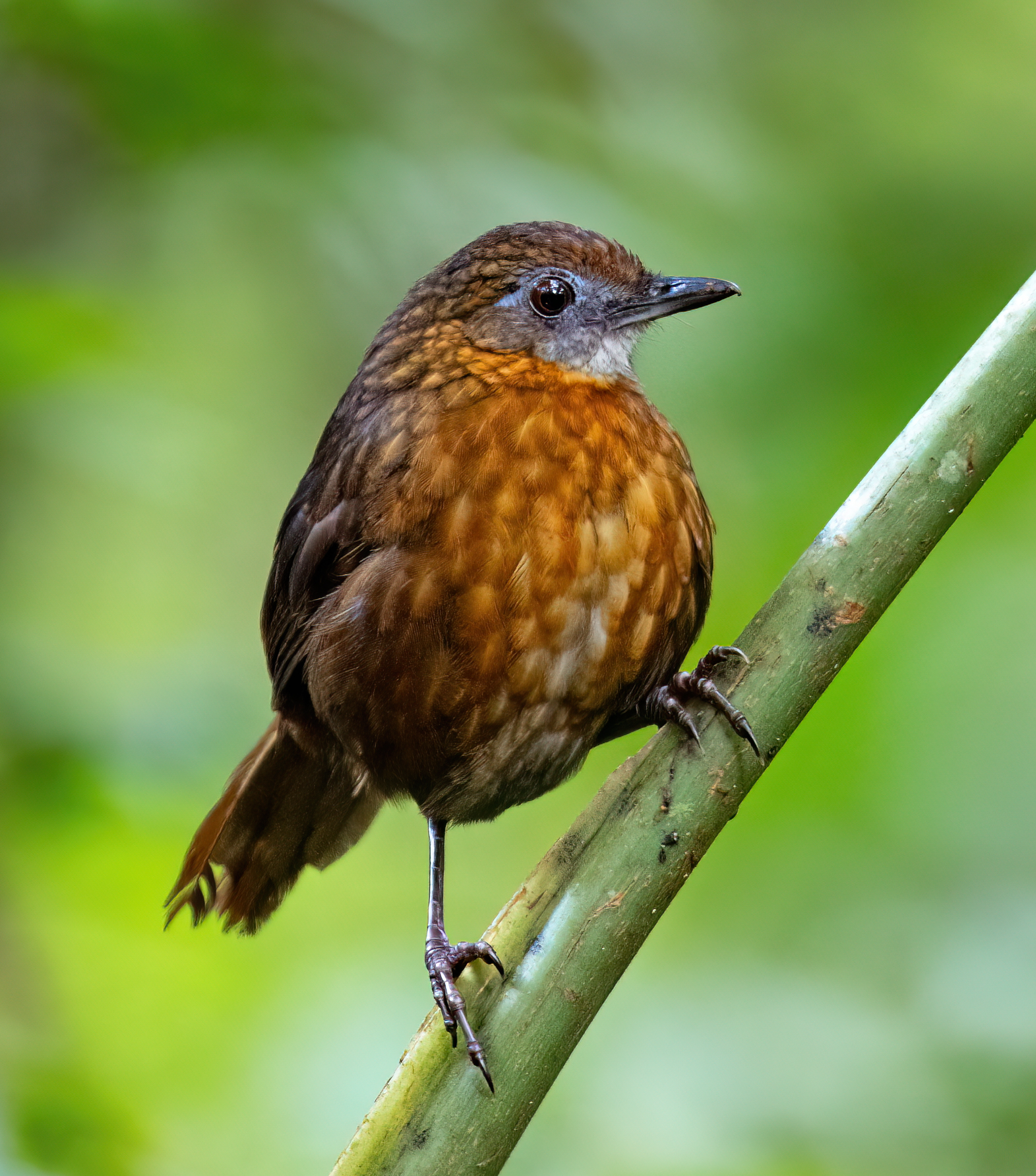

Conservation status
- Least Concern (IUCN 3.1)

Scientific classification
- Kingdom: Animalia
- Phylum: Chordata
- Class: Aves
- Order: Passeriformes
- Family: Pellorneidae
- Genus: Gypsophila
- Species: G. rufipectus

Binomial name
- Gypsophila rufipectus (Salvadori, 1879)

Synonyms
- Gypsophila rufipecta; Napothera rufipectus; Turdinus rufipectus

= Rusty-breasted wren-babbler =

Species of bird

The rusty-breasted wren-babbler (Gypsophila rufipectus) is a species of bird in the family Pellorneidae. It is endemic to western Sumatra in Indonesia.

Its natural habitats are subtropical or tropical moist lowland forest and subtropical or tropical moist montane forest.
