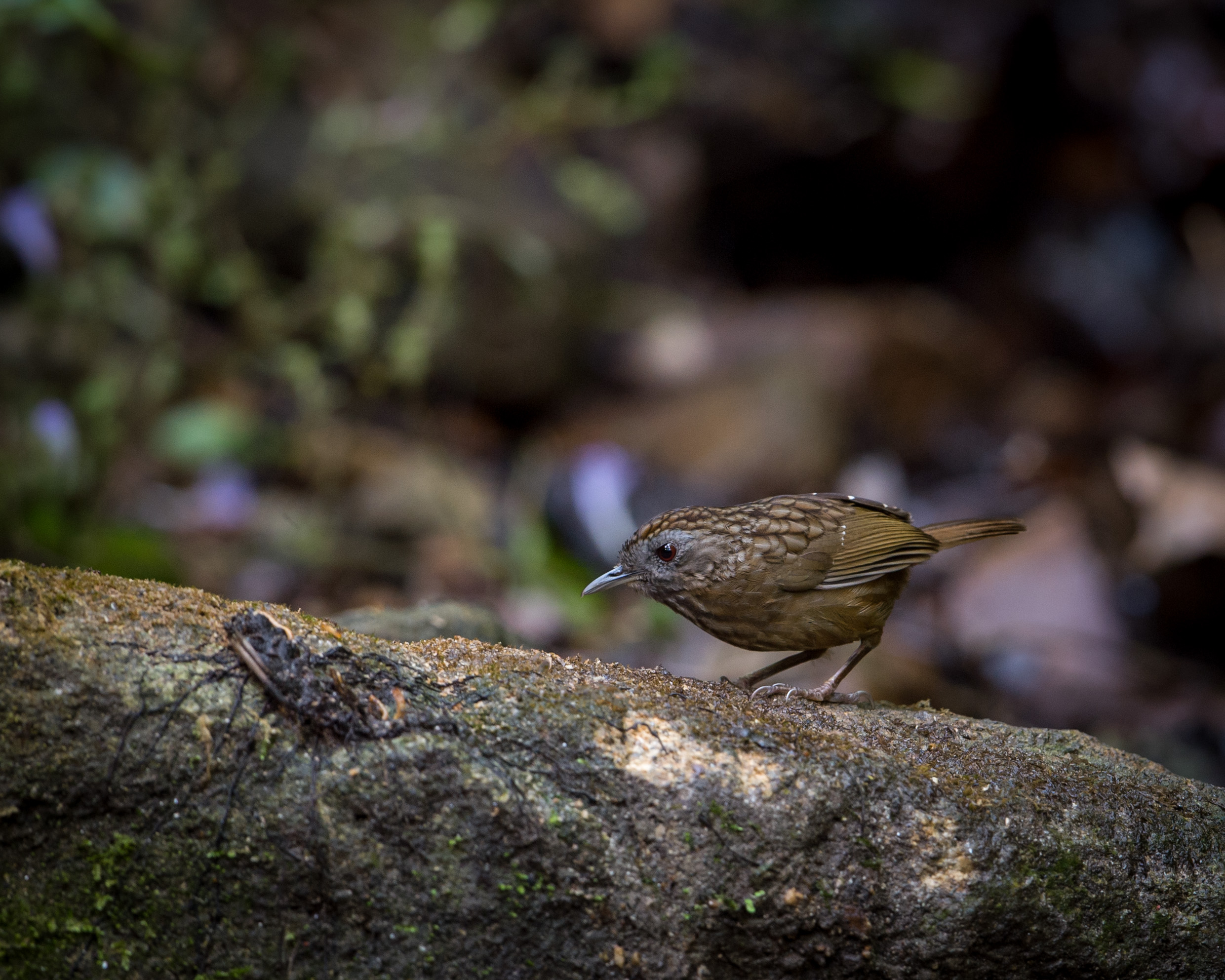
- Streaked wren-babbler (Gypsophila brevicaudata)

Scientific classification
- Kingdom: Animalia
- Phylum: Chordata
- Class: Aves
- Order: Passeriformes
- Family: Pellorneidae
- Genus: Gypsophila; Oates, 1883

= Gypsophila (bird) =

Genus of birds

Gypsophila is a genus of birds in the family Pellorneidae.

== Species ==
The genus contains the following 6 species:

Image	Common name	Scientific name	Distribution
	Rusty-breasted wren-babbler	Gypsophila rufipectus	western Sumatra in Indonesia.
	Variable limestone babbler	Gypsophila crispifrons	Thailand northwest to southern Myanmar.
	Streaked wren-babbler	Gypsophila brevicaudata	Bangladesh, Cambodia, China, India, Laos, Malaysia, Myanmar, Thailand and Vietnam.
	Annam limestone babbler	Gypsophila annamensis	northern Laos, Vietnam and southern China
	Rufous limestone babbler	Gypsophila calcicola	central Thailand.
	Mountain wren-babbler	Gypsophila crassa	northeastern Borneo
