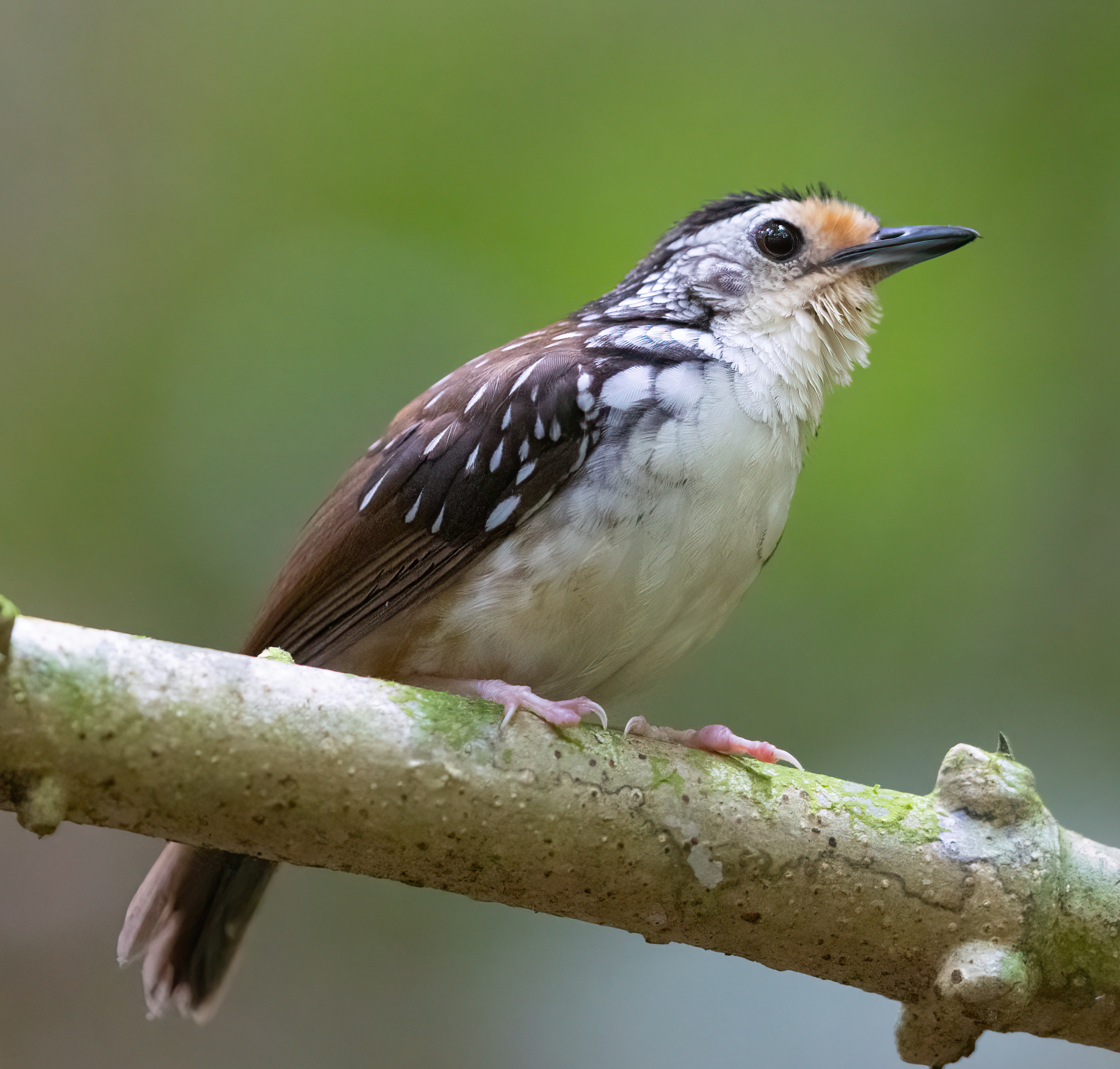

Conservation status
- Near Threatened (IUCN 3.1)

Scientific classification
- Kingdom: Animalia
- Phylum: Chordata
- Class: Aves
- Order: Passeriformes
- Family: Pellorneidae
- Genus: Kenopia; G.R. Gray, 1869
- Species: K. striata

Binomial name
- Kenopia striata (Blyth, 1842)

= Striped wren-babbler =

Species of bird

The striped wren-babbler (Kenopia striata) is a species of bird in the family Pellorneidae. It is monotypic within the genus Kenopia. It is found in Brunei, Indonesia, Malaysia, and Thailand. Its natural habitats are subtropical or tropical moist lowland forest and subtropical or tropical swampland. It is threatened by habitat loss.
