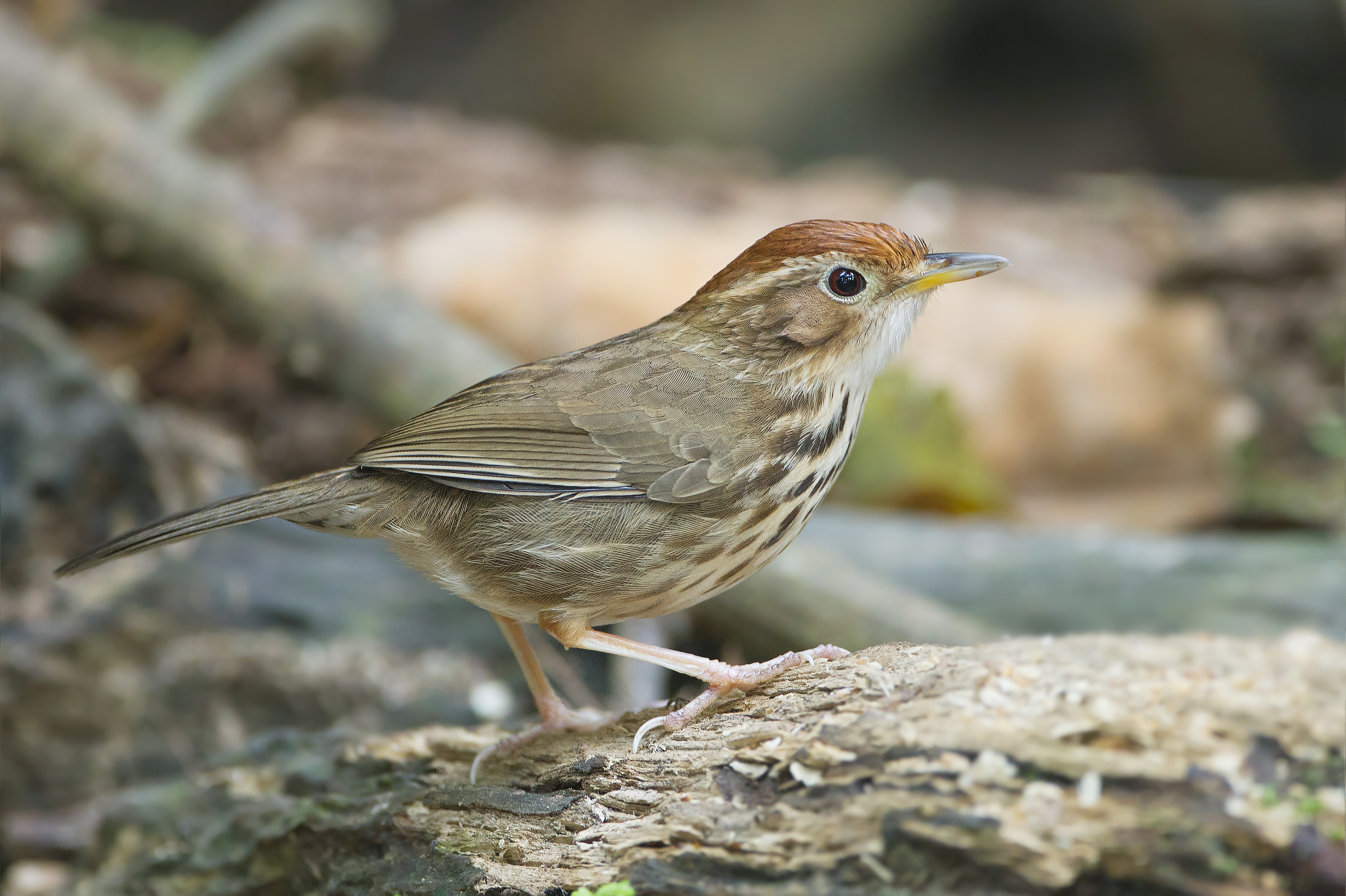
- Puff-throated babbler (Pellorneum ruficeps)

Scientific classification
- Kingdom: Animalia
- Phylum: Chordata
- Class: Aves
- Order: Passeriformes
- Superfamily: Sylvioidea
- Family: Pellorneidae; Delacour, 1946

Genera
- Laticilla; Schoeniparus; Ptilocichla; Napothera; Gypsophila; Turdinus; Gampsorhynchus; Illadopsis; Malacocincla; Malacopteron; Kenopia; Graminicola; Pellorneum

= Pellorneidae =

Family of birds

The ground babblers are a family, Pellorneidae, of mostly Old World passerine birds belonging to the superfamily Sylvioidea. They are quite diverse in size and coloration, and usually characterised by soft, fluffy plumage and a tail on average the length of their body, or longer. These birds are found in tropical zones, with the greatest biodiversity in Southeast Asia and the Indian subcontinent.

Morphological diversity is rather high; most species resemble warblers, jays or thrushes, making field identification difficult.

The family Pellorneidae was first introduced by the French-American ornithologist Jean Théodore Delacour in 1946. Pellorneidae used to be one of four subfamilies of Timaliidae (tree- and scimitar-babblers), but was then elevated to its own family rank in 2011 based on molecular markers.

== Description ==
Jungle babblers are small to medium-sized birds, averaging 14 cm in length and around 30 g in mass, ranging from 10–26 cm and 12–36 g, respectively.

Divided between being terrestrial and arboreal, Pellorneidae have strong legs. They usually have generalised bills, similar to those of a thrush or warbler, with the exception of the long-billed wren-babbler (Napothera malacoptila) and both species of scimitar babbler from the Jabouilleia genus which have long, curved bills. Most jungle babblers have predominantly brown plumage with little sexual dimorphism, but brightly coloured species of this family also exist. Many jungle babblers have distinctive 'eyebrows' and 'caps' which may help to differentiate them from similarly-sized and coloured species.

This group is not strongly migratory, and most species have short rounded wings, and weak flight. They live in lightly wooded, scrubland, or jungle environments, ranging from swamp to near-desert. They are primarily insectivorous, although many will also take berries, and the larger, omnivorous species will even eat small lizards and other vertebrates.

== Behaviour ==
Jungle babblers are generally non-migratory, social birds, defined by their lack of seasonal plumage and unspotted juvenile plumage. These birds tend to be shy, but a few species are highly territorial and respond to playbacks of their vocalisations. Breeding behaviour is not well known for all species of jungle babbler, but some birds, such as the Streaked wren-babbler (Napothera brevicaudata) have adapted to their habitat by nesting in holes or shallow cavities in the limestone cliffs and boulders of their region. Others nest on the ground or in trees or shrubs. Care of nestlings by both parents is common, and cooperative breeding is prevalent among babblers

== Distribution and habitat ==
Pellorneidae are found throughout the tropics of Asia and Africa. Preferring sheltered places, these birds tend to stick to the undergrowth or forest edge.

== Taxonomy and systematics ==
Originally placed within Timaliidae as a subfamily, Pellorneidae was elevated into family status following a closer analysis of the superfamily Sylvioidea. Sylvioidea was initially considered too complex to differentiate using morphology due to multiple instances of convergent evolution, and it wasn't until molecular analysis was conducted that the superfamily was recognised to be non-monophyletic - hence Pellorneidae being recognised as a family. Pellorneidae is a sister to a clade containing the families Leiothrichidae and Alcippeidae.

Another taxonomy revision was the renaming of the rufous-vented grass babbler (Laticilla burnesii) and swamp grass babbler (Laticilla cinerascens) from Prinia (in the family Cisticolidae) to Laticilla. Data sequencing using mitochondrial and nuclear markers revealed that P. burnesii and P. cinerascens belonged in a different family to the other members of Cisticolidae, with the results supported by Bayesian inference

The cladogram below showing the phylogenetic relationships between the families is based on a study of the babblers by Tianlong Cai and colleagues published in 2019. The species numbers are from AviList.

- - - Pycnonotidae – bulbuls (161 species)
    - - - Sylviidae – sylviid warblers (32 species)
        - Paradoxornithidae – parrotbills and myzornis (38 species)
      - - Zosteropidae – white-eyes (147 species)
        - - Timaliidae – tree babblers (58 species)
          - - Pellorneidae – ground babblers (65 species)
            - Leiothrichidae – laughingthrushes and allies (143 species)

The cladogram below shows the relationships between the genera.

- Pellorneidae
  - Graminicola – grassbirds (2 species)
  - - Turdinus – wren-babblers (3 species)
    - - - Malacopteron – babblers (6 species)
        - - Gampsorhynchus – babblers (2 species)
          - Schoeniparus – fulvettas (7 species)
      - - Pellorneum – babblers (18 species)
        - - - Laticilla – grass babblers (2 species)
            - Illadopsis – illadopsis (9 species)
          - - Kenopia – striped wren-babbler
            - - - Malacocincla – babblers (3 species)
                - Gypsophila – wren-babblers and limestone babblers (6 species)
              - - Ptilocichla – wren-babblers (3 species)
                - Napothera – wren-babblers and scimitar babblers (6 species)

The family includes 68 species divided into 13 genera:

Graminicola

- Indian grassbird (Graminicola bengalensis)
- Chinese grassbird (Graminicola striatus)

Turdinus

- Black-throated wren-babbler (Turdinus atrigularis)
- Large wren-babbler (Turdinus macrodactylus)
- Marbled wren-babbler (Turdinus marmoratus)

Malacopteron

- Moustached babbler (Malacopteron magnirostre)
- Sooty-capped babbler (Malacopteron affine)
- Scaly-crowned babbler (Malacopteron cinereum)
- Rufous-crowned babbler (Malacopteron magnum)
- Melodious babbler (Malacopteron palawanense)
- Grey-breasted babbler (Malacopteron albogulare)

Gampsorhynchus

- White-hooded babbler (Gampsorhynchus rufulus)
- Collared babbler (Gampsorhynchus torquatus)

Schoeniparus

- Yellow-throated fulvetta (Schoeniparus cinereus)
- Rufous-winged fulvetta (Schoeniparus castaneceps)
- Black-crowned fulvetta (Schoeniparus klossi)
- Golden-fronted fulvetta (Schoeniparus variegaticeps)
- Rufous-throated fulvetta (Schoeniparus rufogularis)
- Rusty-capped fulvetta (Schoeniparus dubius)
- Dusky fulvetta (Schoeniparus brunneus)

Pellorneum

- Puff-throated babbler (Pellorneum ruficeps)
- Brown-capped babbler (Pellorneum fuscocapillus)
- Marsh babbler (Pellorneum palustre)
- Malayan black-capped babbler (Pellorneum nigrocapitatum)
- Javan black-capped babbler (Pellorneum capistratum)
- Bornean black-capped babbler (Pellorneum capistratoides)
- Mourning babbler (Pellorneum malaccense)
- Glissando babbler (Pellorneum saturatum)
- Leaflitter babbler (Pellorneum poliogene)
- Ashy-headed babbler (Pellorneum cinereiceps)
- Spot-throated babbler (Pellorneum albiventre)
- Buff-breasted babbler (Pellorneum tickelli)
- Sumatran babbler (Pellorneum buettikoferi)
- Temminck's babbler (Pellorneum pyrrogenys)
- Malayan swamp babbler (Pellorneum rostratum)
- Bornean swamp babbler (Pellorneum macropterum)
- Ferruginous babbler (Pellorneum bicolor)
- Sulawesi babbler (Pellorneum celebense)

Laticilla (species moved here from Prinia in the Cisticolidae)

- Rufous-vented grass babbler (Laticilla burnesii)
- Swamp grass babbler (Laticilla cinerascens)

Illadopsis

- Brown illadopsis (Illadopsis fulvescens)
- Pale-breasted illadopsis (Illadopsis rufipennis)
- Tanzanian illadopsis (Illadopsis distans)
- Mountain illadopsis (Illadopsis pyrrhoptera)
- Blackcap illadopsis (Illadopsis cleaveri)
- Scaly-breasted illadopsis (Illadopsis albipectus)
- Spotted thrush-babbler (Illadopsis turdina)
- Puvel's illadopsis (Illadopsis puveli)
- Rufous-winged illadopsis (Illadopsis rufescens)

Kenopia - monotypic

- Striped wren-babbler (Kenopia striata)

Malacocincla

- Abbott's babbler (Malacocincla abbotti)
- Horsfield's babbler (Malacocincla sepiaria)
- Black-browed babbler (Malacocincla perspicillata)

Gypsophila

- Rusty-breasted wren-babbler (Gypsophila rufipectus)
- Variable limestone babbler (Gypsophila crispifrons)
- Streaked wren-babbler (Gypsophila brevicaudata)
- Mountain wren-babbler (Gypsophila crassa)
- Annam limestone babbler (Gypsophila annamensis)
- Rufous limestone babbler (Gypsophila calcicola)

Ptilocichla

- Falcated wren-babbler (Ptilocichla falcata)
- Bornean wren-babbler (Ptilocichla leucogrammica)
- Striated wren-babbler (Ptilocichla mindanensis)

Napothera

- Eyebrowed wren-babbler (Napothera epilepidota)
- Long-billed wren-babbler (Napothera malacoptila)
- Sumatran wren-babbler (Napothera albostriata)
- White-throated wren-babbler (Napothera pasquieri)
- Short-tailed scimitar babbler (Napothera danjoui)
- Naung Mung scimitar babbler (Napothera naungmungensis)
