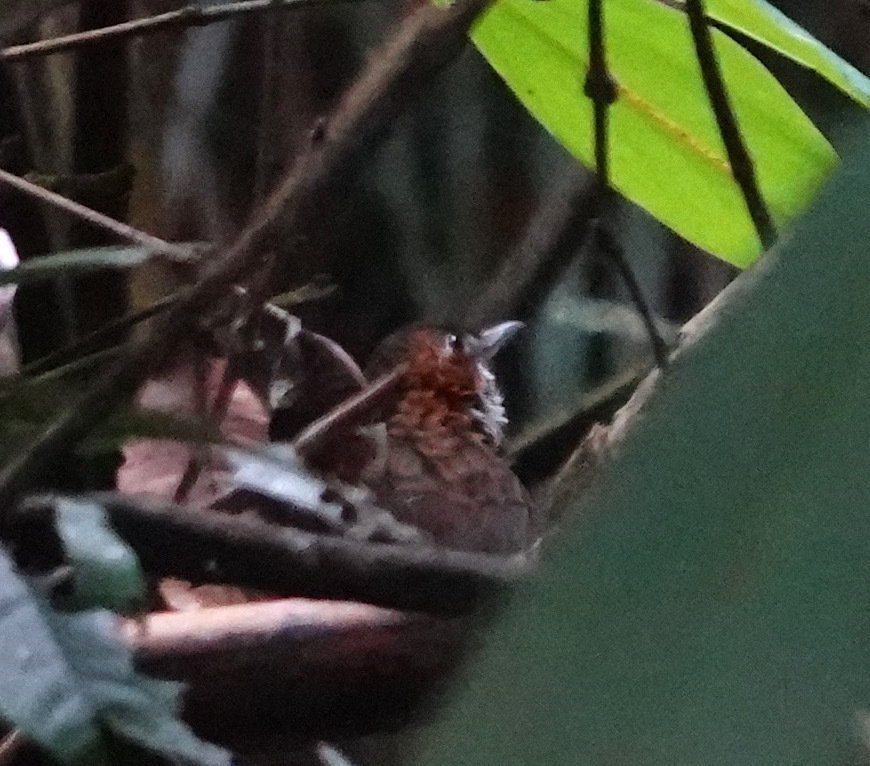

Conservation status
- Least Concern (IUCN 3.1)

Scientific classification
- Kingdom: Animalia
- Phylum: Chordata
- Class: Aves
- Order: Passeriformes
- Family: Pellorneidae
- Genus: Turdinus
- Species: T. marmoratus

Binomial name
- Turdinus marmoratus Wardlaw-Ramsay, RG, 1880

Synonyms
- Napothera marmorata

= Marbled wren-babbler =

Species of bird

The marbled wren-babbler (Turdinus marmoratus) is a species of bird in the family Pellorneidae. It is found in the Malay Peninsula and the Barisan Mountains of Sumatra. Its natural habitats are subtropical or tropical moist lowland forest and subtropical or tropical moist montane forest.
