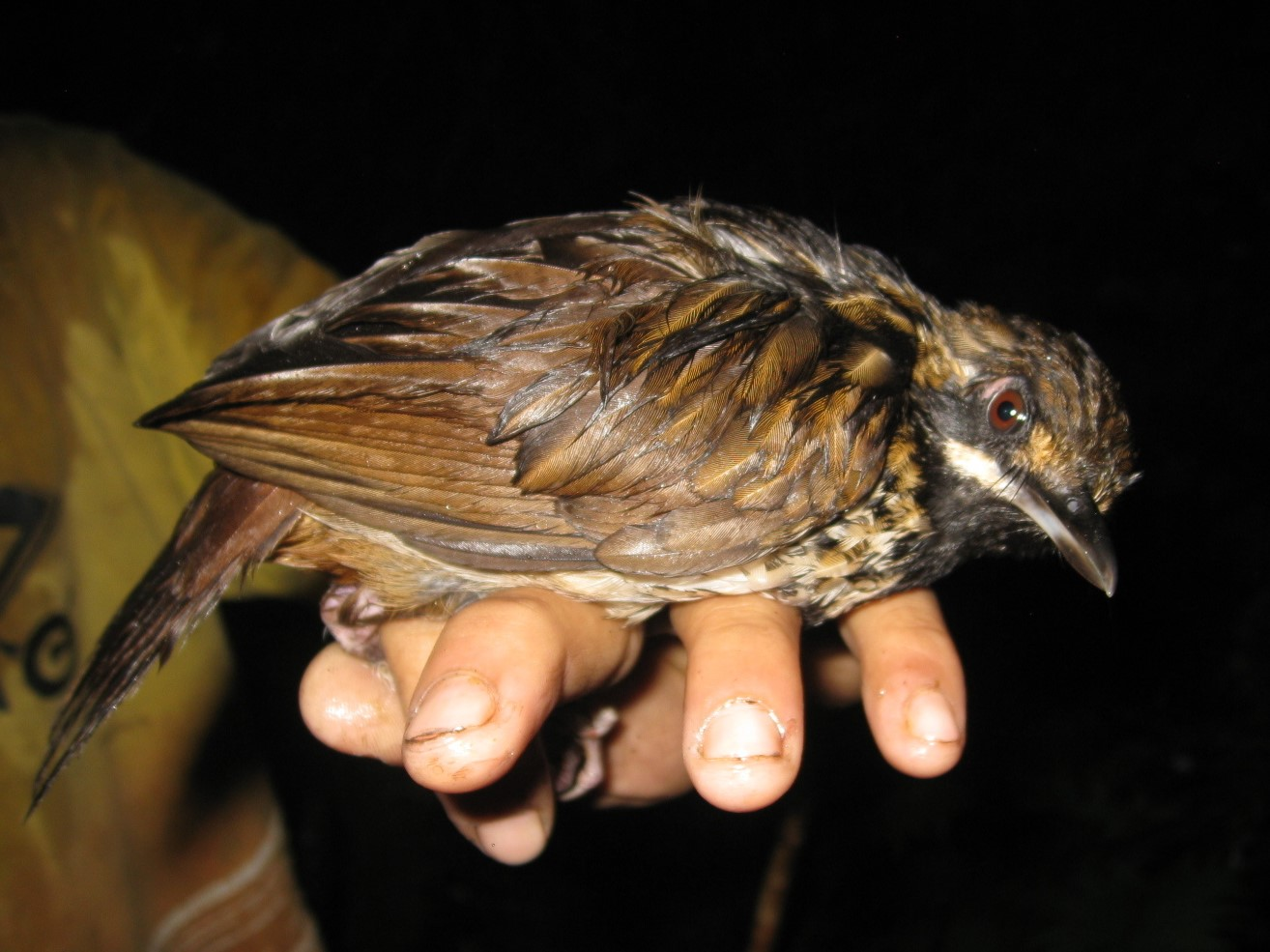

Conservation status
- Near Threatened (IUCN 3.1)

Scientific classification
- Kingdom: Animalia
- Phylum: Chordata
- Class: Aves
- Order: Passeriformes
- Family: Pellorneidae
- Genus: Turdinus
- Species: T. atrigularis

Binomial name
- Turdinus atrigularis (Bonaparte, 1850)

Synonyms
- Cacopitta atrigularis; Napothera atrigularis; Napothera atrigularus

= Black-throated wren-babbler =

Species of bird

The black-throated wren-babbler (Turdinus atrigularis) is a species of bird in the family Pellorneidae. It is endemic to the island of Borneo (mainly southern Brunei and East Malaysia).

Its natural habitats are subtropical or tropical moist lowland forest and subtropical or tropical moist montane forest. It resides primarily in the understory. It is threatened by habitat loss.

It is insectivorous.
