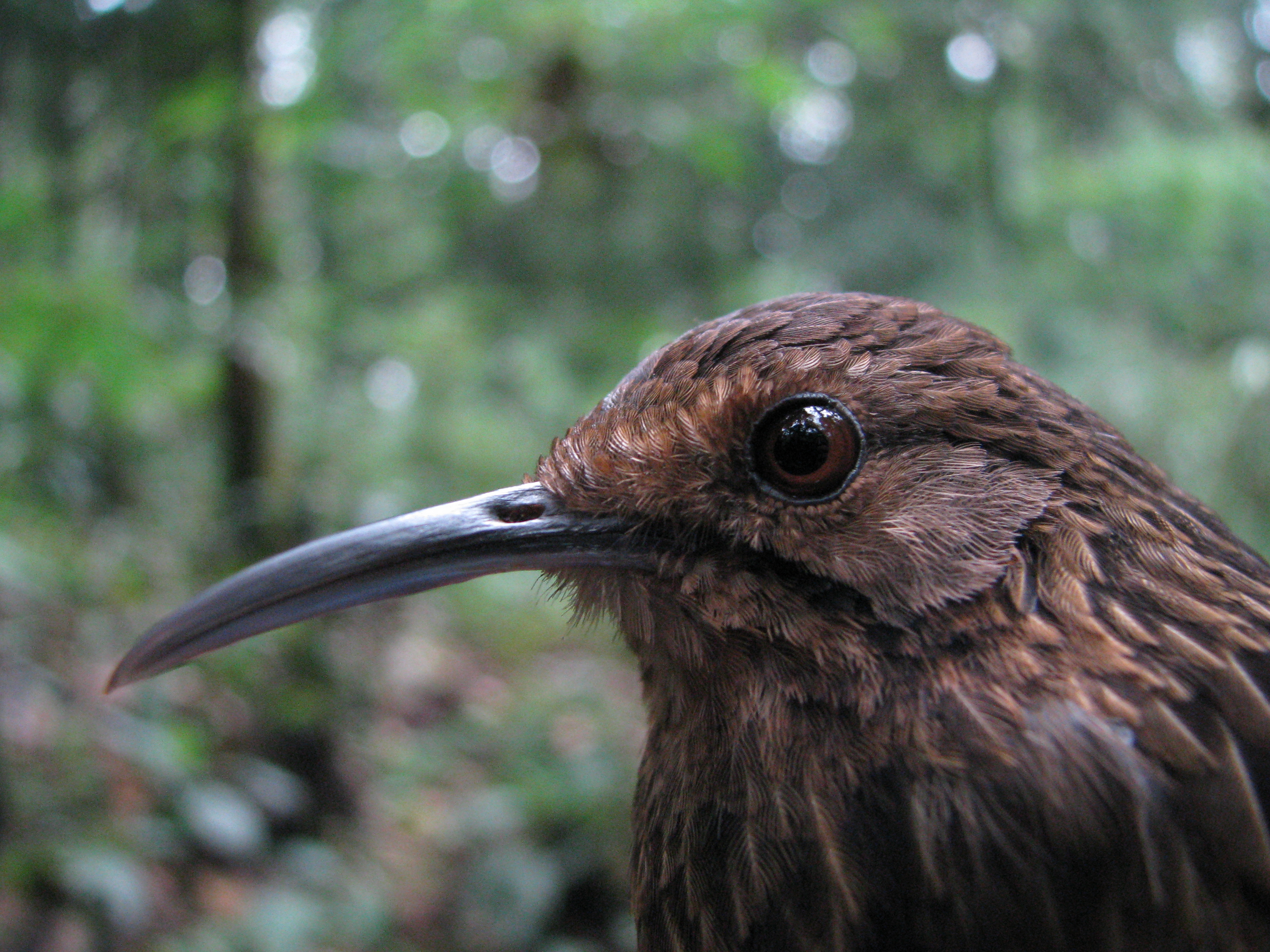

Conservation status
- Least Concern (IUCN 3.1)

Scientific classification
- Kingdom: Animalia
- Phylum: Chordata
- Class: Aves
- Order: Passeriformes
- Family: Pellorneidae
- Genus: Napothera
- Species: N. malacoptila

Binomial name
- Napothera malacoptila (Blyth, 1847)

Synonyms
- Rimator malacoptilus

= Long-billed wren-babbler =

Species of bird

The long-billed wren-babbler (Napothera malacoptila) is a species of bird in the family Pellorneidae.

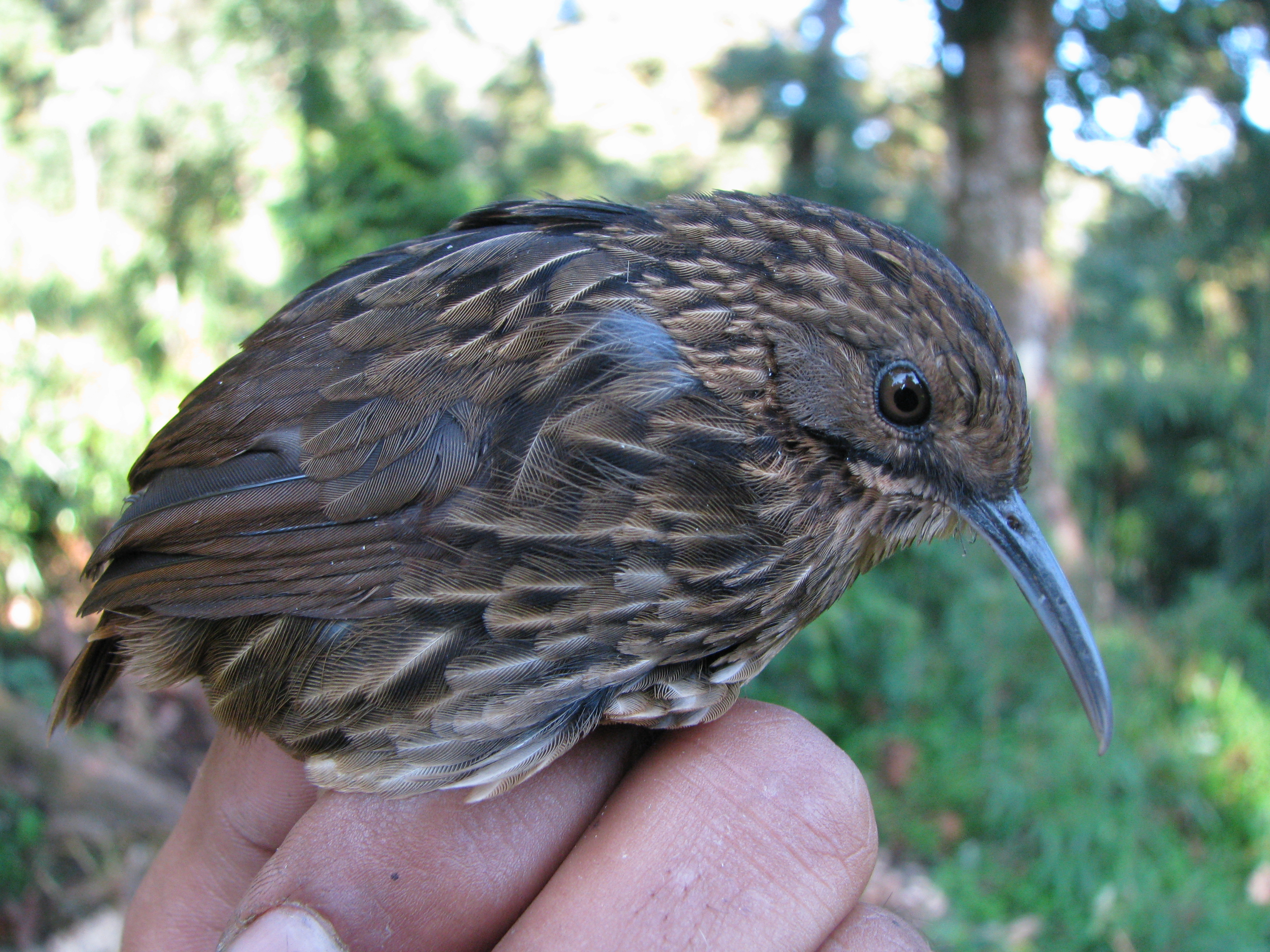
A bird from Arunachal Pradesh, Zangnan, India

It is found in the Himalayas from north-eastern India to southern China. Its natural habitat is subtropical or tropical moist montane forests.
