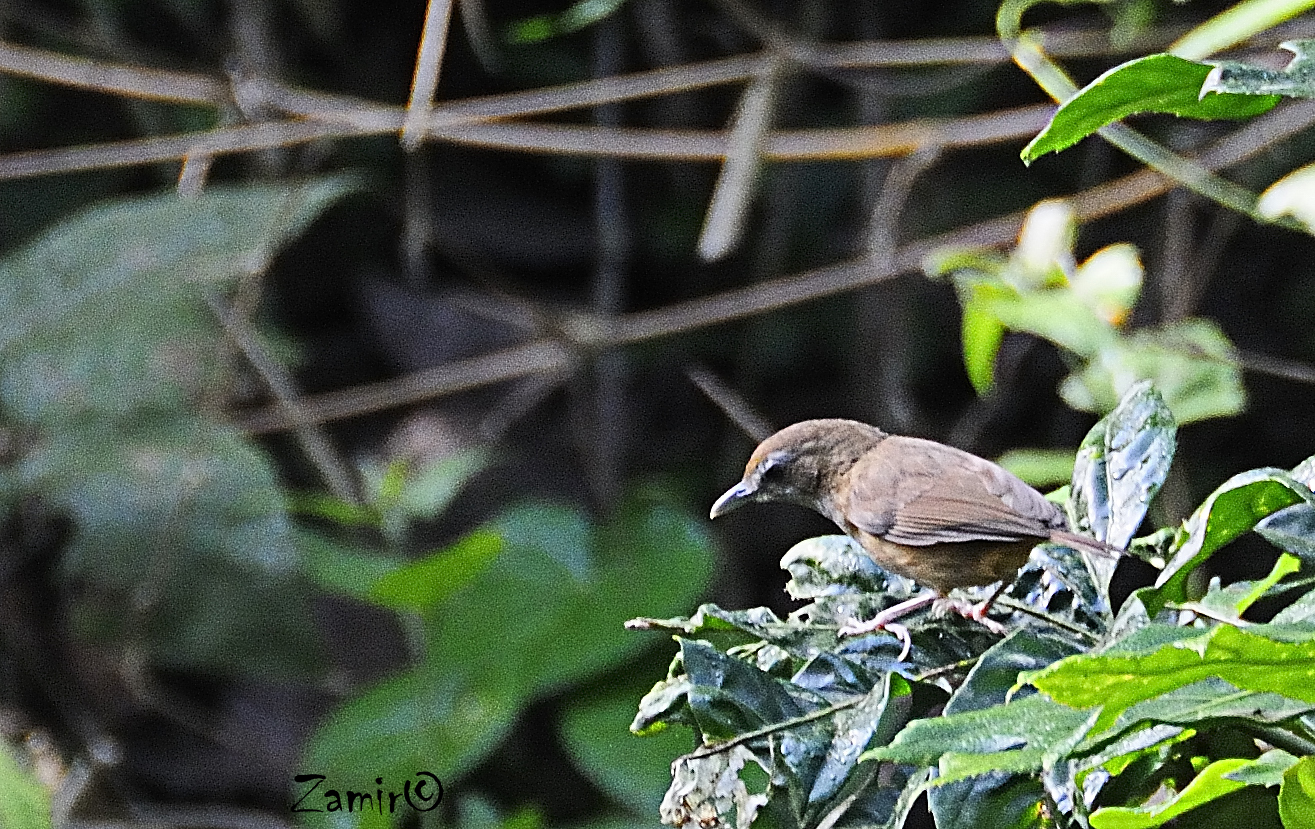
- Abbott's babbler, Malacocincla abbotti

Scientific classification
- Kingdom: Animalia
- Phylum: Chordata
- Class: Aves
- Order: Passeriformes
- Family: Pellorneidae
- Genus: Malacocincla; Blyth, 1845

Type species
- Malacocincla abbotti Blyth, 1845

= Malacocincla =

Genus of birds

Malacocincla is a genus of passerine birds in the family Pellorneidae. The type species for this genus is M. abbotti, and a 2012 study shows that members of the genus Malacocincla as defined earlier fall into multiple clades and are therefore polyphyletic. M. abbotti and M. sepiaria remain within a common clade and could be retained in the genus if generic reassignments occur. This clade is a sister of the genus Napothera. M. cinereiceps and M. malaccensis fall into a different clade and are a sister to the genus Trichastoma and nested within several species of Pellorneum. The position of M. perspicillata has not been resolved.

== Species ==
The genus contains the following three species:

Image	Common name	Scientific name	Distribution
	Abbott's babbler	Malacocincla abbotti	Southeast Asia.
	Horsfield's babbler	Malacocincla sepiaria	Brunei, Indonesia, Malaysia, and Thailand
	Black-browed babbler	Malacocincla perspicillata	Borneo
