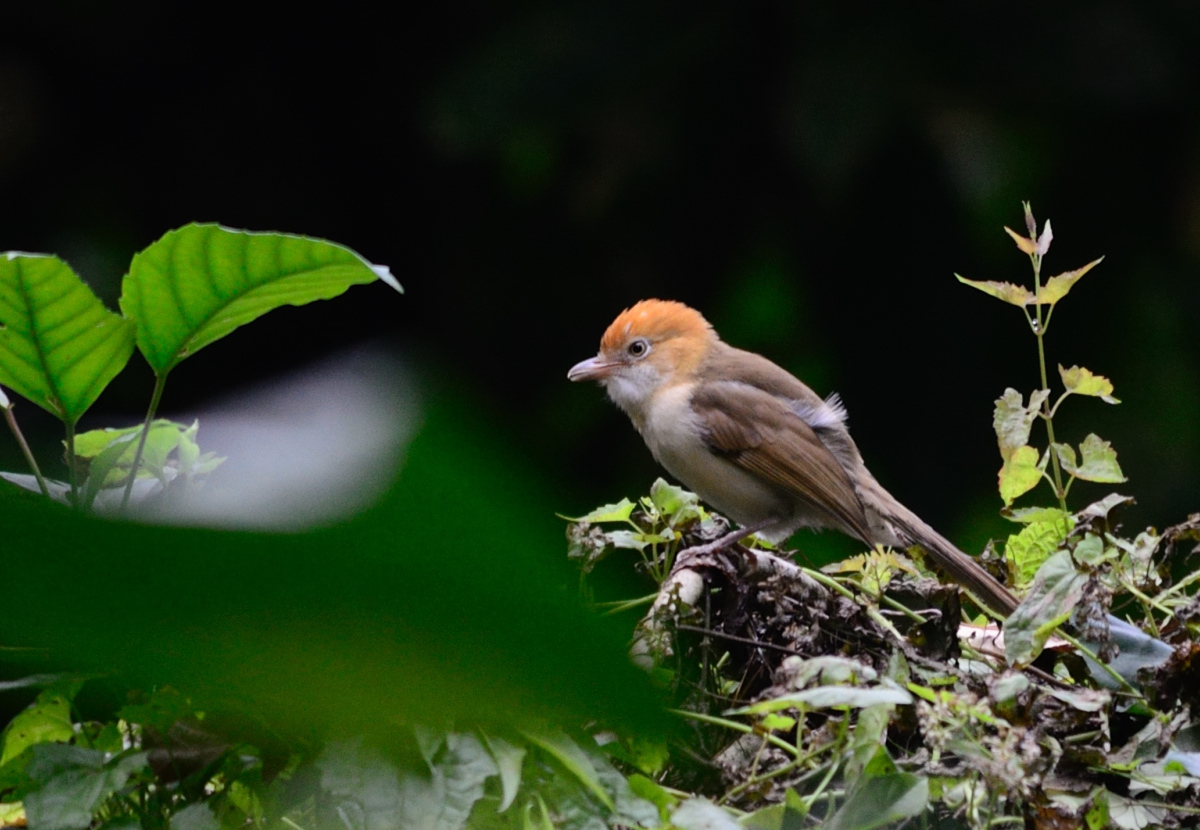
- White-hooded babbler (Gampsorhynchus rufulus)

Scientific classification
- Kingdom: Animalia
- Phylum: Chordata
- Class: Aves
- Order: Passeriformes
- Family: Pellorneidae
- Genus: Gampsorhynchus; Blyth, 1844

Type species
- Gampsorhynchus rufulus Blyth, 1844

= Gampsorhynchus =

Genus of birds

Gampsorhynchus is a genus of birds in the family Pellorneidae.

== Species ==
It contains the following species:

Image	Common name	Scientific name	Distribution
	White-hooded babbler	Gampsorhynchus rufulus	Central Myanmar and Southwest China
	Collared babbler	Gampsorhynchus torquatus	Laos, Malaysia, Myanmar, Thailand, and Vietnam.
