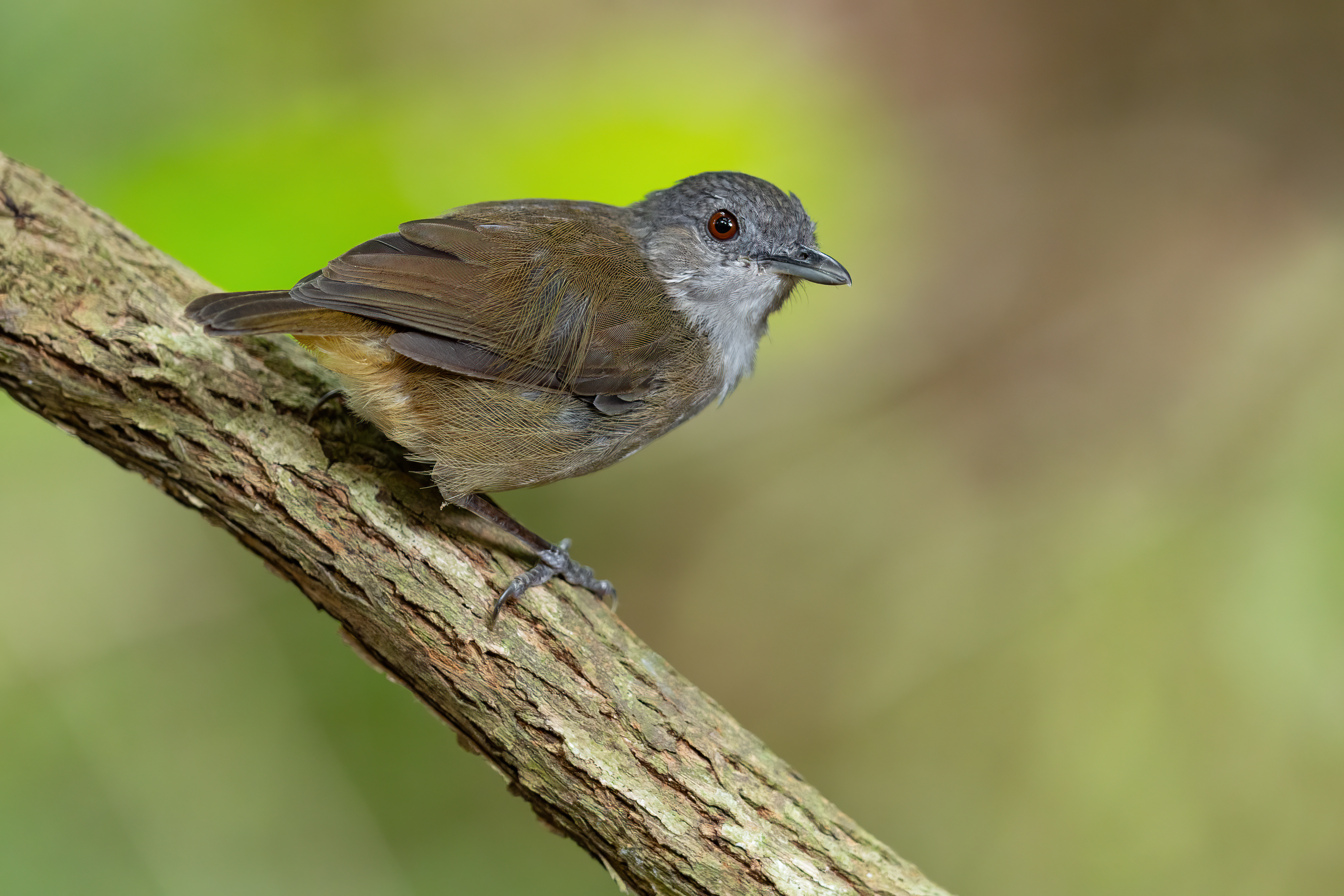

Conservation status
- Least Concern (IUCN 3.1)

Scientific classification
- Kingdom: Animalia
- Phylum: Chordata
- Class: Aves
- Order: Passeriformes
- Family: Pellorneidae
- Genus: Malacocincla
- Species: M. sepiaria

Binomial name
- Malacocincla sepiaria (Horsfield, 1821)

= Horsfield's babbler =

Species of bird

Horsfield's babbler (Malacocincla sepiaria) is a species of bird in the family Pellorneidae. It is found in Brunei, Indonesia, Malaysia, and Thailand. Its natural habitats are subtropical or tropical moist lowland forest and subtropical or tropical moist montane forest.

The common name commemorates the American naturalist Thomas Horsfield.
