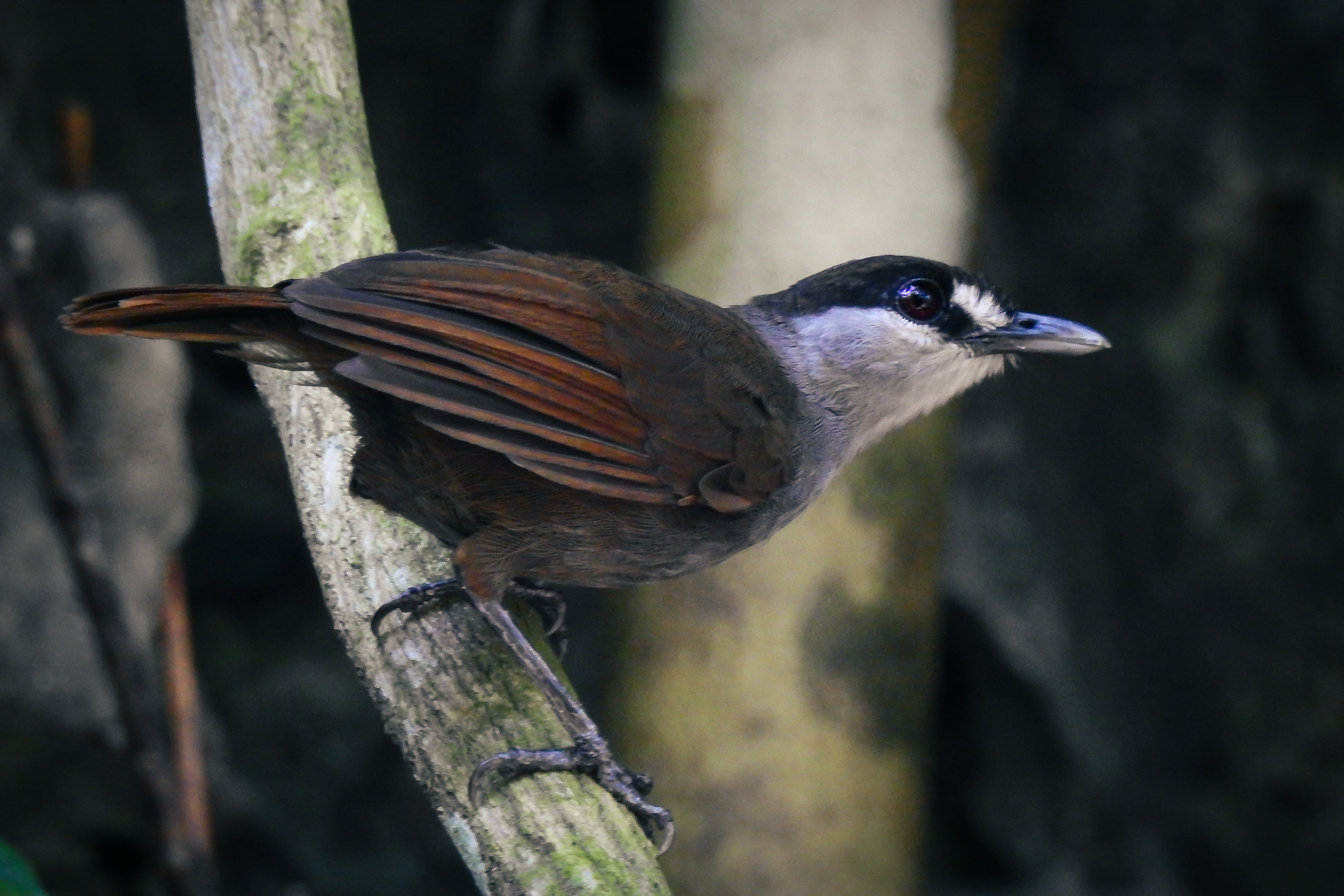

Conservation status
- Near Threatened (IUCN 3.1)

Scientific classification
- Kingdom: Animalia
- Phylum: Chordata
- Class: Aves
- Order: Passeriformes
- Family: Pellorneidae
- Genus: Malacocincla
- Species: M. perspicillata

Binomial name
- Malacocincla perspicillata (Bonaparte, 1850)

Synonyms
- Cacopitta (Myiothera) perspicillata Bonaparte, 1850; Trichastoma perspicillatum — Collar & Andrew, 1988

= Black-browed babbler =

Species of bird

The black-browed babbler (Malacocincla perspicillata) is a songbird species in the family Pellorneidae. The species is endemic to Borneo. Only a single specimen collected in the nineteenth century was known, until the species was rediscovered in Borneo in 2020.

== Habitat ==
The natural habitat of M. perspicillata is subtropical or tropical moist lowland forests, at altitudes of 200–1,170 m (660–3,840 ft).

Its rediscovery in 2020 confirmed that the bird is from southeast Borneo.

== Conservation status ==
M. perspicillata was formerly classified as Vulnerable by the IUCN, but due to the lack of information surrounding the species, its status was changed to Data Deficient in 2008. As of 2024, the species is listed as Near Threatened. The songbird is threatened by agriculture, logging allowed within protected areas, plantations for rubber and palm oil, and drought fires. Within the next few years, there is risk of near complete loss of dryland lowland forest in Kalimantan.

=== Rediscovery ===
In October 2020, M. perspicillata was rediscovered in South Kalimantan by two local men, Muhammad Suranto and Muhammad Rizky Fauzan, 170 years after the last confirmed sighting.

The rediscovered bird next to a 5.000 rupiah note.

Interest in the rediscovery has drawn birdwatchers to the area and added to knowledge of the bird's behaviour, such as: "moving in and out of the limestone caves and crevices, clambering about in the rugged environment to hunt insects and other invertebrates", and its song: "a unique, loud and melodious vocalisation, often sounded in a duet."

== Sources ==
- BirdLife International (BLI) (2008): 2008 IUCN Redlist status changes. Retrieved 23 May 2008
- Collar, N.J.; Robson, C. (2007): Family Timaliidae (Babblers). In: del Hoyo, Josep; Elliott, Andrew; Christie, D.A. (eds.): Handbook of Birds of the World, Volume 12 (Picathartes to Tits and Chickadees): 70–291. Barcelona: Lynx Edicions.
