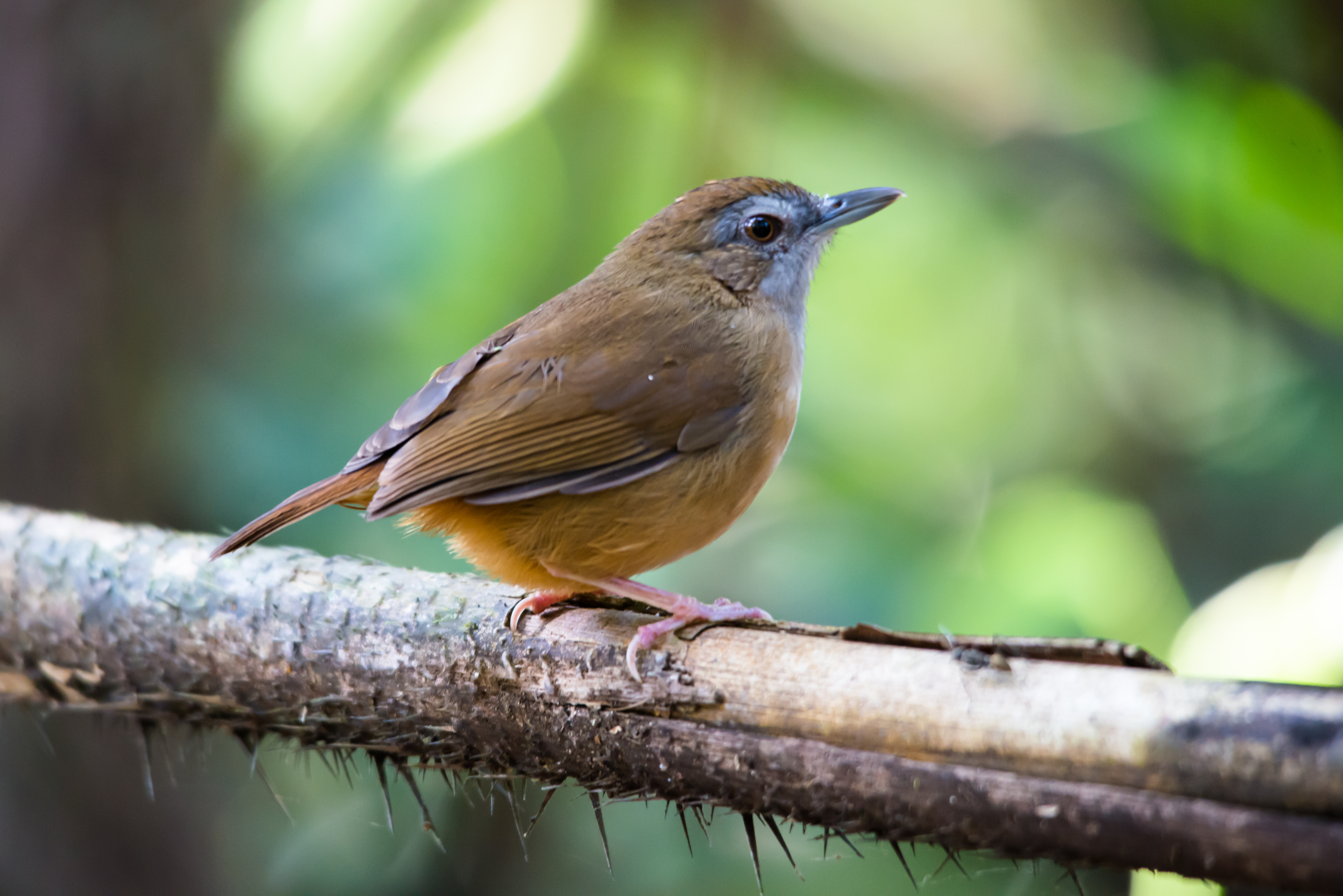
- Khao Yai National Park, Thailand
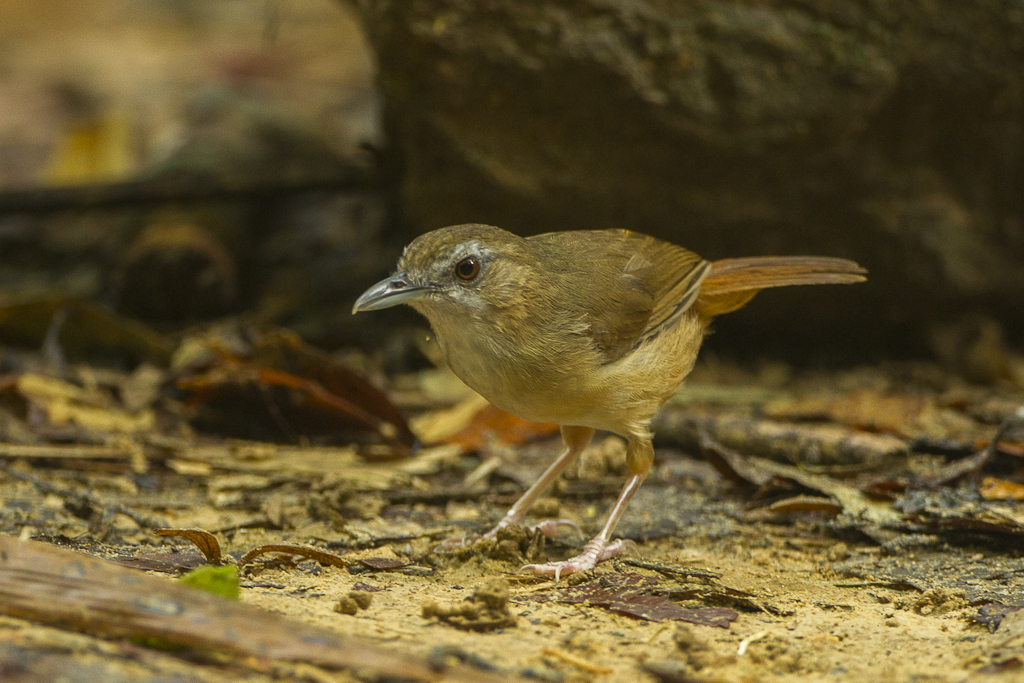

Conservation status
- Least Concern (IUCN 3.1)

Scientific classification
- Kingdom: Animalia
- Phylum: Chordata
- Class: Aves
- Order: Passeriformes
- Family: Pellorneidae
- Genus: Malacocincla
- Species: M. abbotti

Binomial name
- Malacocincla abbotti Blyth, 1845

Synonyms
- Trichastoma abbotti; Turdinus abbotti

= Abbott's babbler =

Species of bird

Abbott's babbler (Malacocincla abbotti) is a species of bird in the family Pellorneidae. It is widely distributed along the Himalayas in South Asia and extending into the forests of Southeast Asia. They are short-tailed and stout birds which forage in pairs in dense undergrowth close to the ground and their presence is indicated by their distinctive calls.

== Taxonomy ==
Abbott's babbler was described by the English zoologist Edward Blyth in 1845 and given the binomial name Malacocincla abbotti. The genus name Malacocincla combines the Ancient Greek malakos meaning "soft" with modern Latin cinclus, meaning "thrush"; referring to the birds' full and drooping plumage. The specific name abbotti was chosen by Blyth to honour the specimen collector, Lieutenant Colonel J. R. Abbott (1811–1888), who served in British India as Assistant Commissioner of the Arakan from 1837 to 1845. Blyth erected the new genus Malacocincla for this species, but subsequent workers placed the species in Turdinus and Trichastoma. A revision reinstated its placement in Malacocincla in 1985. A 2001 study confirmed the cohesiveness of the Trichastoma group but a 2012 study shows that M. abbotti and M. sepiaria are in a clade along with Napothera, while M. cinereiceps and M. malaccensis fall into a different clade along with the genus Trichastoma and several species of Pellorneum. An isolated population occurs in the Visakhapatnam Ghats, well separated from the nearest main distribution along the Himalayas and was named after Indian ornithologist K.S.R. Krishna Raju by Dillon Ripley and Bruce Beehler in 1985. The nominate population is from southern Myanmar and extends to southern Tenasserim and northwestern Malaya including the Langkawi Islands. Several other populations of this widespread species have been named as subspecies and not all are recognized. The population in the eastern Himalayas from eastern Nepal to Sikkim and Assam was named as amabile, but is now considered within the nominate subspecies. Others include altera (central Laos and Annam), williamsoni (eastern Thailand and northwestern Cambodia), obscurior (coastal southeastern Thailand), olivaceum (Peninsular Thailand and Malaya), sirense (Borneo, Pulau Mata Siri), and baweanum (Bawean Island).

Eight subspecies are recognized:

- M. a. abbotti Blyth, 1845 – east Himalayas to central Malay Peninsula
- M. a. krishnarajui Ripley & Beehler, 1985 – east India
- M. a. williamsoni Deignan, 1948 – east Thailand to south Vietnam
- M. a. obscurior Deignan, 1948 – east Thailand and southwest Cambodia
- M. a. altera Sims, 1957 – central Laos and central Vietnam
- M. a. olivacea Strickland, 1847 – south Malay Peninsula and Sumatra
- M. a. concreta Büttikofer, 1895 – Borneo and Belitung Island
- M. a. baweana Oberholser, 1917 – Bawean Island (north of Java)

== Description ==
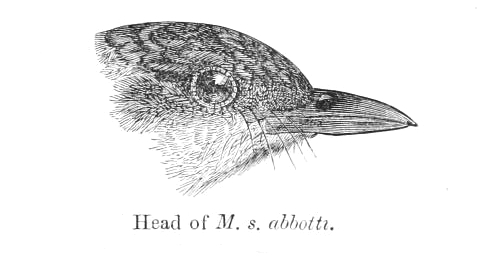
Head showing the strong bill

The adult Abbott's babbler is a nondescript, brown, short-tailed babbler that moves about in the low vegetation often near streams and in the vicinity of tree ferns and tangled vegetation. The throat is gray-white while the center of the belly is white, and the flanks are olive. The undertail coverts are rusty-colored. The sexes are alike. It has a short tail and heavy bill; it is drab olive-brown with bright rusty lower flanks and vent, a grayish-white throat and breast, and variable pale gray supercilium and lores. Juvenile birds have dark rufescent-brown crowns and upperparts. The calls are distinctive. The subspecies M. a. krishnarajui of the Eastern Ghats has a darker russet tail and rump than the Himalayan nominate subspecies. Specimens measure 12–13 cm (4.7–5.1 in) in length, with a head of 39–44 mm (1.5–1.7 in), and a tail of 55–61 mm (2.2–2.4 in).

== Distribution and habitat ==
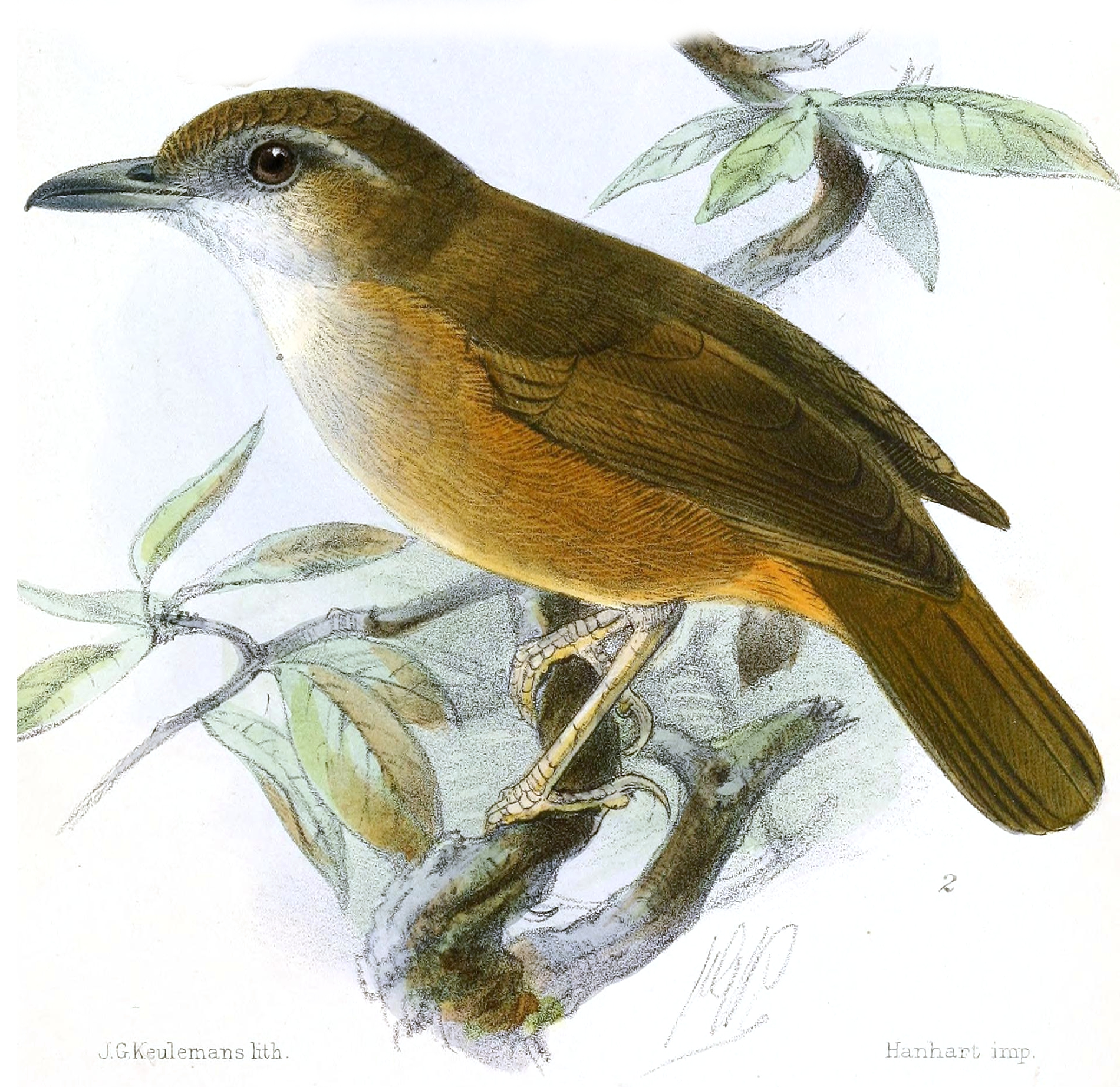
By John Gerrard Keulemans

In South Asia, Abbott's babbler is resident from Nepal to Arunachal Pradesh and the Assam Valley in India, south throughout the South Assam hills, including Meghalaya and south through the Lushai Hills. It is also resident in east and south Bangladesh (around Jessore and Khulna), and the Eastern Ghats in northeast Andhra Pradesh and Odisha. It occurs up to 600 m (2,000 ft), 275 m (902 ft) in Nepal. It is widely distributed across Southeast Asia.

It is common across much of its large range. It is seen in the understory of broadleaved evergreen forest, forest edge, secondary growth, and scrub. In Singapore, they have been noted as being tolerant to disturbance and adapting to secondary growth, and disturbed forest.

== Behavior and ecology ==
Abbott's babbler usually moves around in pairs close to the ground. They breed from April to July (summer monsoon), with the nest being a carefully placed but bulky cup low in palms or other undergrowth. A study in Thailand found that most nests are placed in spiny palms and rattans. The usual clutch is 3 to 5 eggs which are bright salmon with dark blotches and red lines. When disturbed at the nest, the birds slip over the edge and fly with labored wing beats and then hop out of sight. More than one brood may be raised in a season.

Their distinctive calls consists of three or four notes with the a drop on the middle note. The antiphonal duet of a male and female has the male leading with a "poor'ol bear", followed by the female's "dear dear". The tunes may however change over time. The birds tend to remain within a well marked area and do not wander widely. The song is a variable short series of around three to four notes of rich, fluty, liquid, slurred, short whistled notes; these are sometimes delivered haltingly and sometimes rapidly. The evening group song consists of a recurrent sputtering "churrr" sound, which is low and slurred; ending with a sharp "chreep". Calls include soft mewing notes, and a pulsing, purring trill when agitated.
