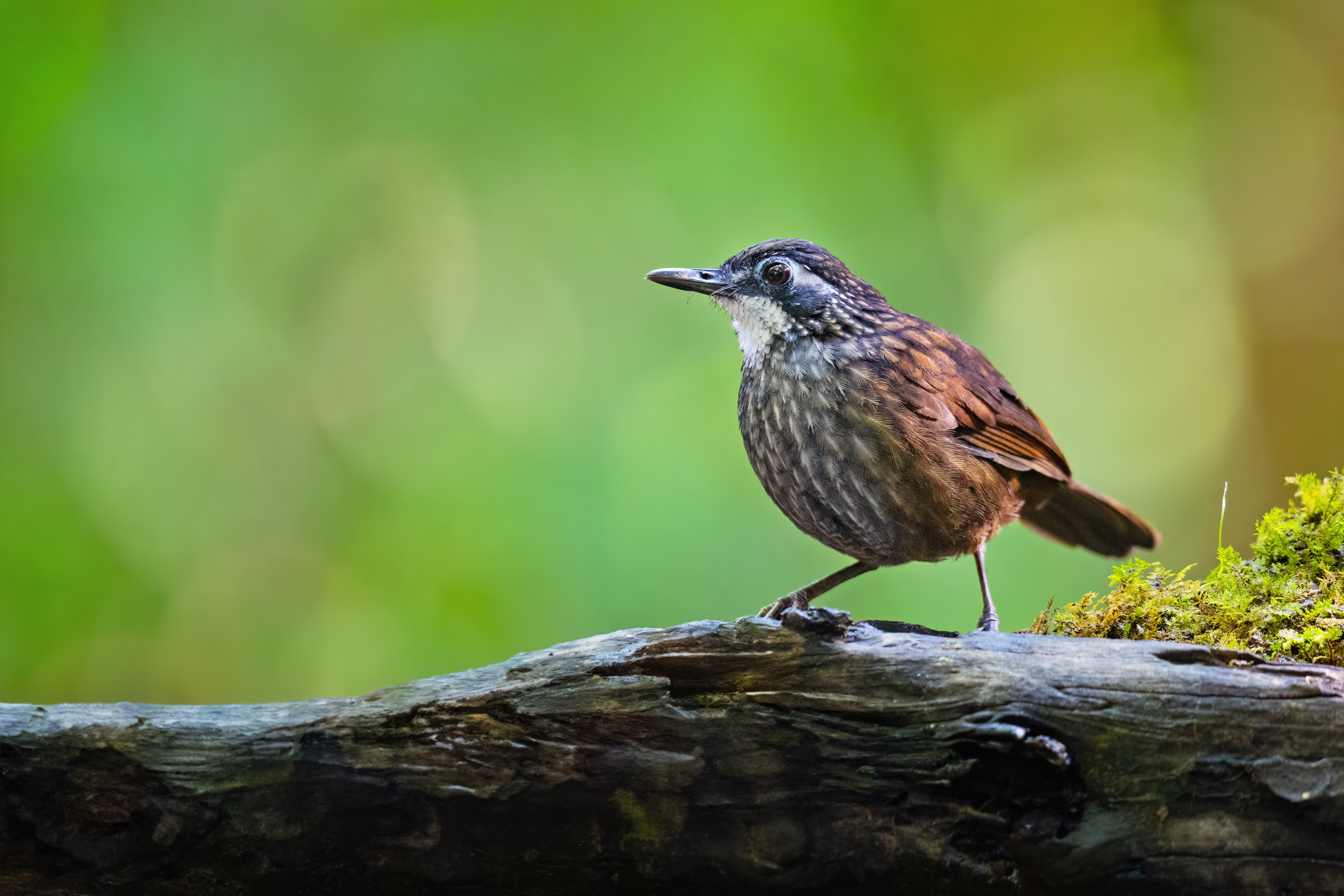

Conservation status
- Near Threatened (IUCN 3.1)

Scientific classification
- Kingdom: Animalia
- Phylum: Chordata
- Class: Aves
- Order: Passeriformes
- Family: Pellorneidae
- Genus: Turdinus
- Species: T. macrodactylus

Binomial name
- Turdinus macrodactylus (Strickland, 1844)

Synonyms
- Malacopteron macrodactylum; Napothera macrodactyla

= Large wren-babbler =

Species of bird

The large wren-babbler (Turdinus macrodactylus) is a species of bird in the family Pellorneidae. It is found in the Malay Peninsula, Sumatra and Java. Its natural habitat is subtropical or tropical moist lowland forest. It is threatened by habitat loss.
