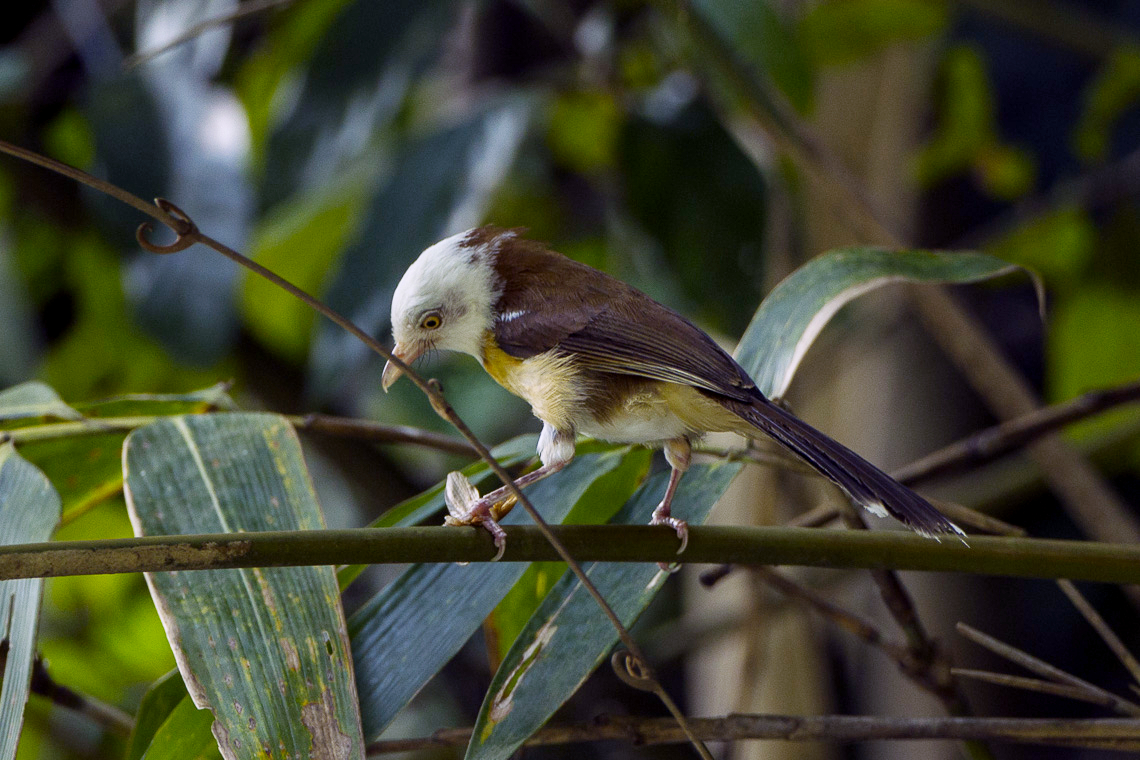

Conservation status
- Least Concern (IUCN 3.1)

Scientific classification
- Kingdom: Animalia
- Phylum: Chordata
- Class: Aves
- Order: Passeriformes
- Family: Pellorneidae
- Genus: Gampsorhynchus
- Species: G. rufulus

Binomial name
- Gampsorhynchus rufulus Blyth, 1844

= White-hooded babbler =

Species of bird

The white-hooded babbler (Gampsorhynchus rufulus) is a species of bird in the family Pellorneidae.

It is found from the eastern Himalayas to central Myanmar and southwestern China. Its natural habitats are subtropical or tropical moist lowland forest and subtropical or tropical moist montane forest.

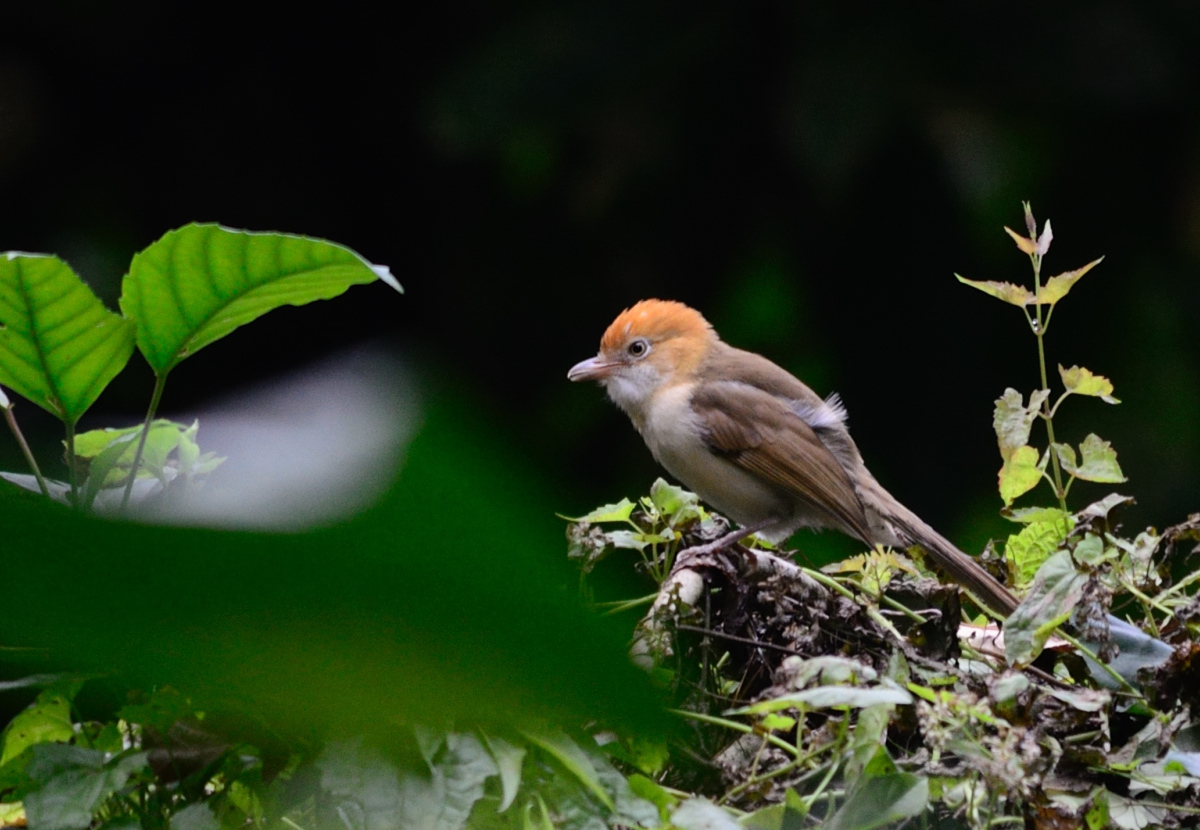
Juveniles show rufous head
