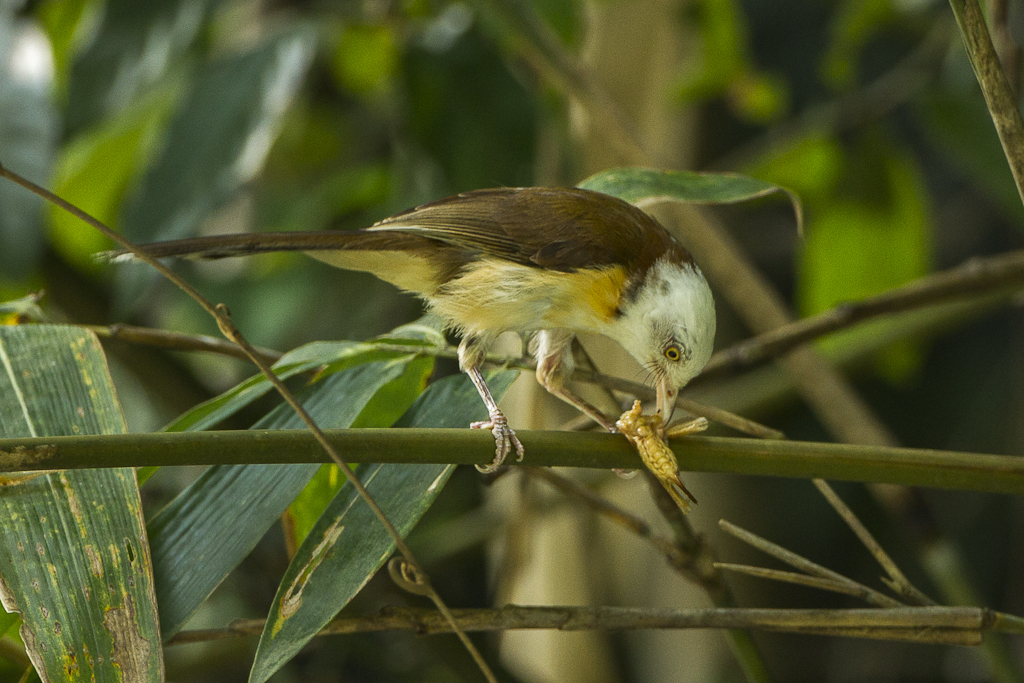

Conservation status
- Least Concern (IUCN 3.1)

Scientific classification
- Kingdom: Animalia
- Phylum: Chordata
- Class: Aves
- Order: Passeriformes
- Family: Pellorneidae
- Genus: Gampsorhynchus
- Species: G. torquatus

Binomial name
- Gampsorhynchus torquatus Hume, 1874

= Collared babbler =

Species of bird

The collared babbler (Gampsorhynchus torquatus) is a species of bird in the family Pellorneidae. It is found in Laos, Malaysia, Myanmar, Thailand, and Vietnam. Its natural habitats are subtropical or tropical moist lowland forest and subtropical or tropical moist montane forest.
