= Turdinus =

Scientific classification
- Kingdom: Animalia
- Phylum: Chordata
- Class: Aves
- Order: Passeriformes
- Family: Pellorneidae
- Genus: Turdinus; Blyth, 1844

Type species
- Malacopteron macrodactylum Strickland, 1844

Genus of birds

Turdinus is a genus of birds in the family Pellorneidae.

The genus contains the following three species:

Image	Common name	Scientific name
	Black-throated wren-babbler	Turdinus atrigularis
	Large wren-babbler	Turdinus macrodactylus
	Marbled wren-babbler	Turdinus marmoratus
