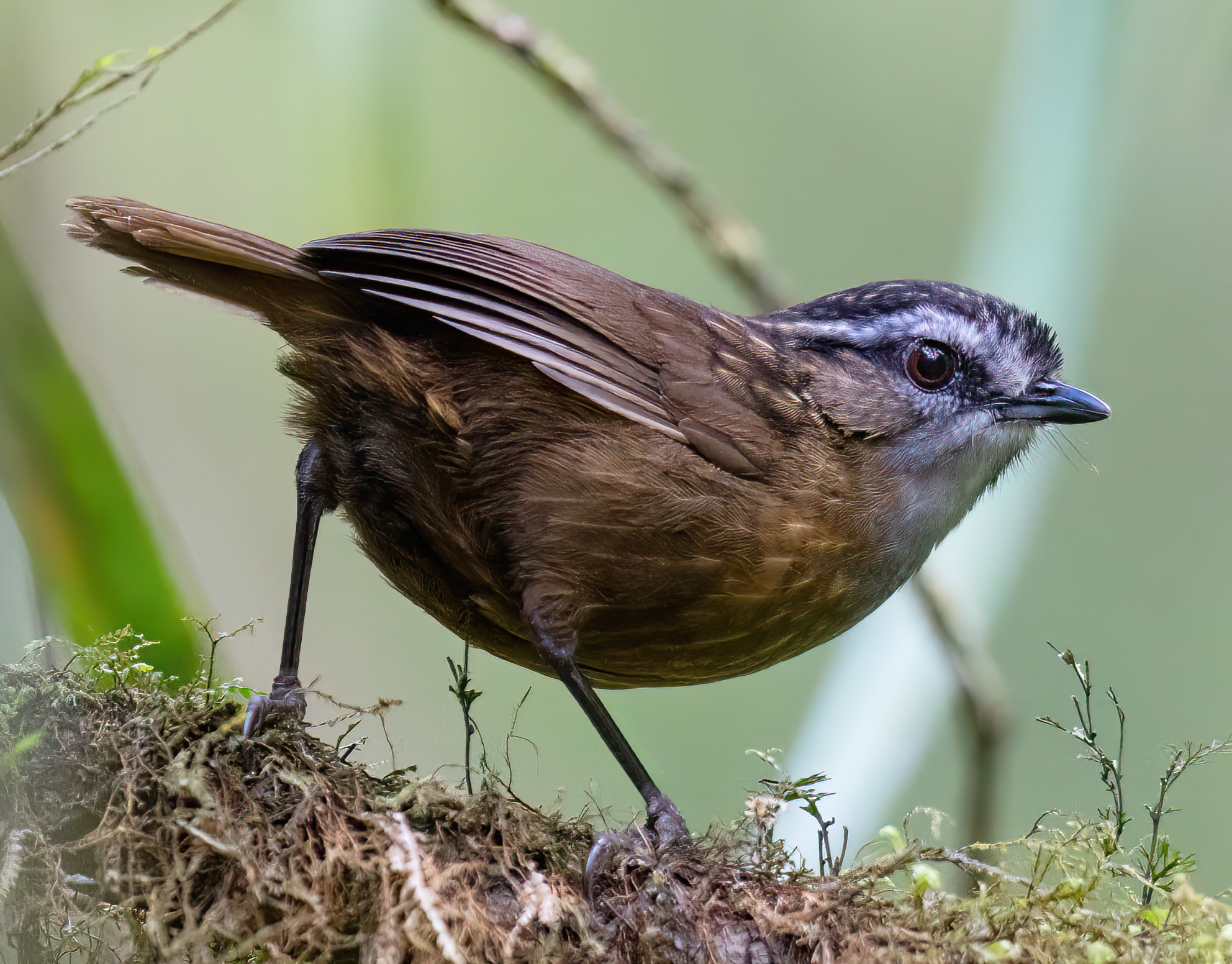

Conservation status
- Least Concern (IUCN 3.1)

Scientific classification
- Kingdom: Animalia
- Phylum: Chordata
- Class: Aves
- Order: Passeriformes
- Family: Pellorneidae
- Genus: Gypsophila
- Species: G. crassa

Binomial name
- Gypsophila crassa (Sharpe, 1888)

Synonyms
- Corythocichla crassa Sharpe, 1888; Napothera crassa (Sharpe, 1888); Turdinus crassus (Sharpe, 1888)

= Mountain wren-babbler =

Species of bird

The mountain wren-babbler (Gypsophila crassa) is a species of bird in the family Pellorneidae. It is native to the Iran Mountains of northeastern Borneo. Its natural habitats are subtropical or tropical moist lowland forest and subtropical or tropical moist montane forest.
