= Streaked wren-babbler =

Conservation status
- Least Concern (IUCN 3.1)

Scientific classification
- Kingdom: Animalia
- Phylum: Chordata
- Class: Aves
- Order: Passeriformes
- Family: Pellorneidae
- Genus: Gypsophila
- Species: G. brevicaudata

Binomial name
- Gypsophila brevicaudata (Blyth, 1855)

Synonyms
- Napothera brevicaudata; Turdinus brevicaudatus

Species of bird

The streaked wren-babbler (Gypsophila brevicaudata) is a species of bird in the family Pellorneidae. It is found in Bangladesh, Cambodia, China, India, Laos, Malaysia, Myanmar, Thailand and Vietnam. Its natural habitats are subtropical or tropical moist lowland forest and subtropical or tropical moist montane forest.

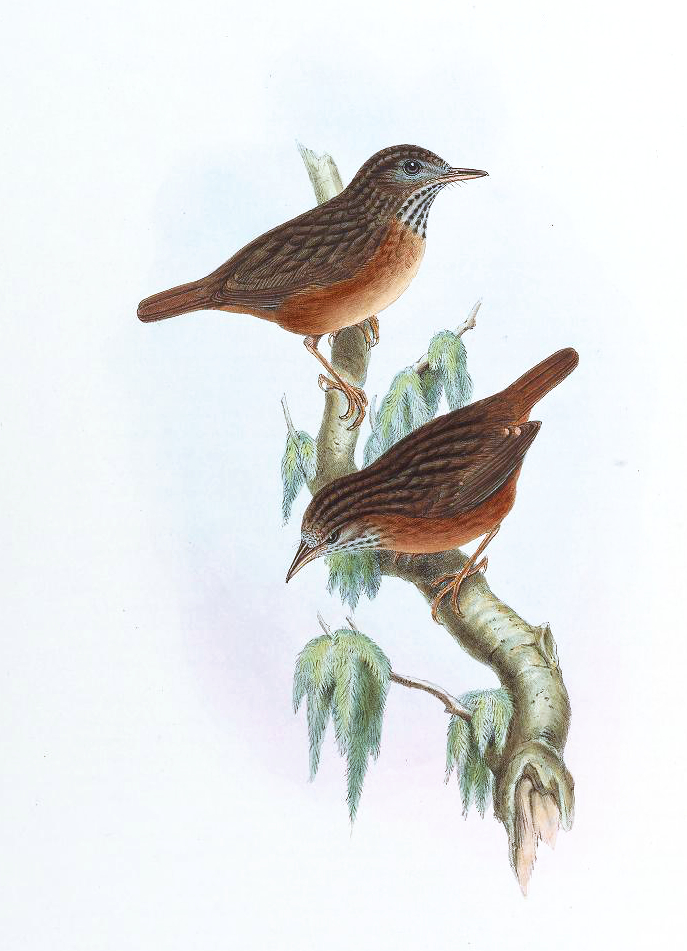

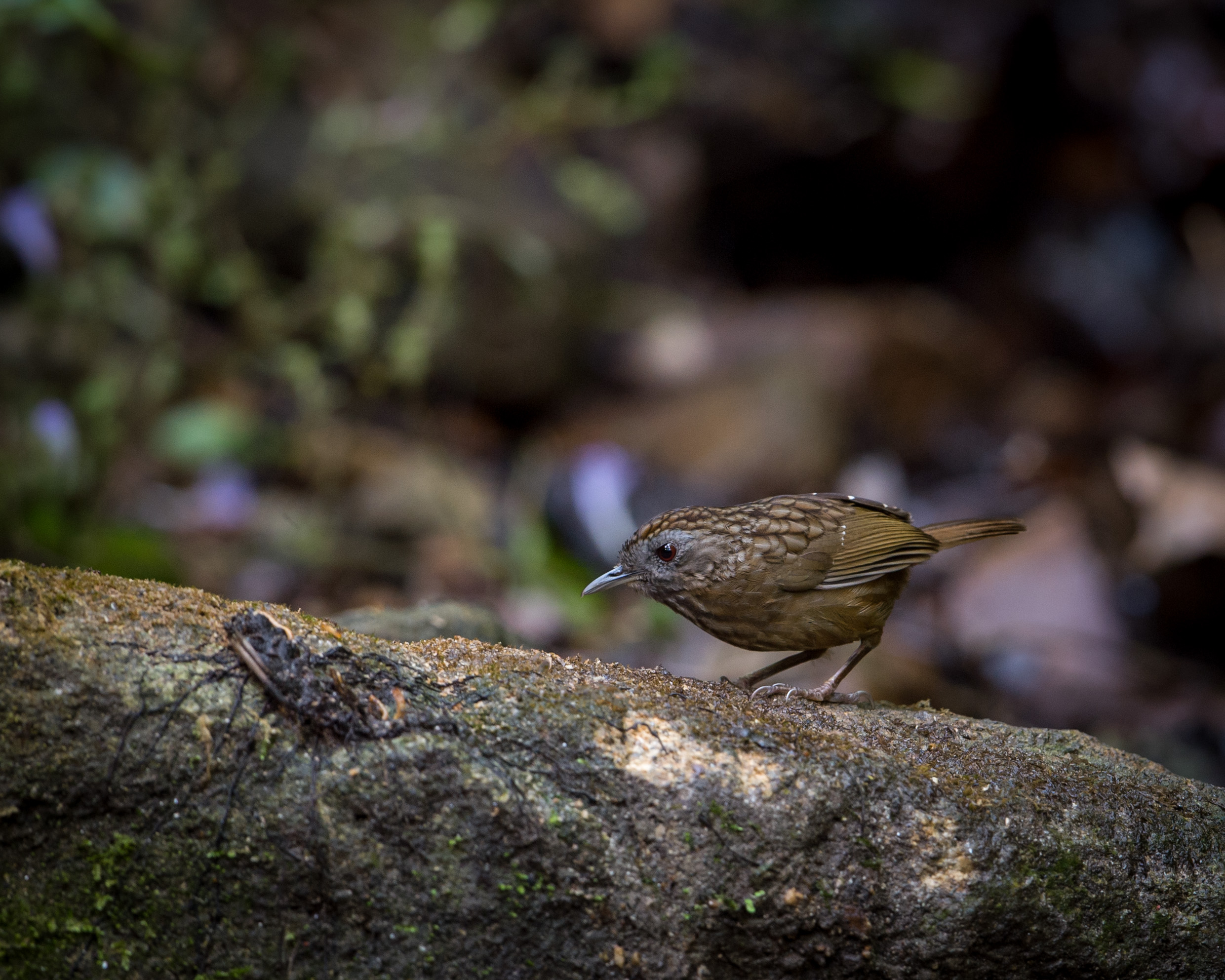
grey-chested variant
