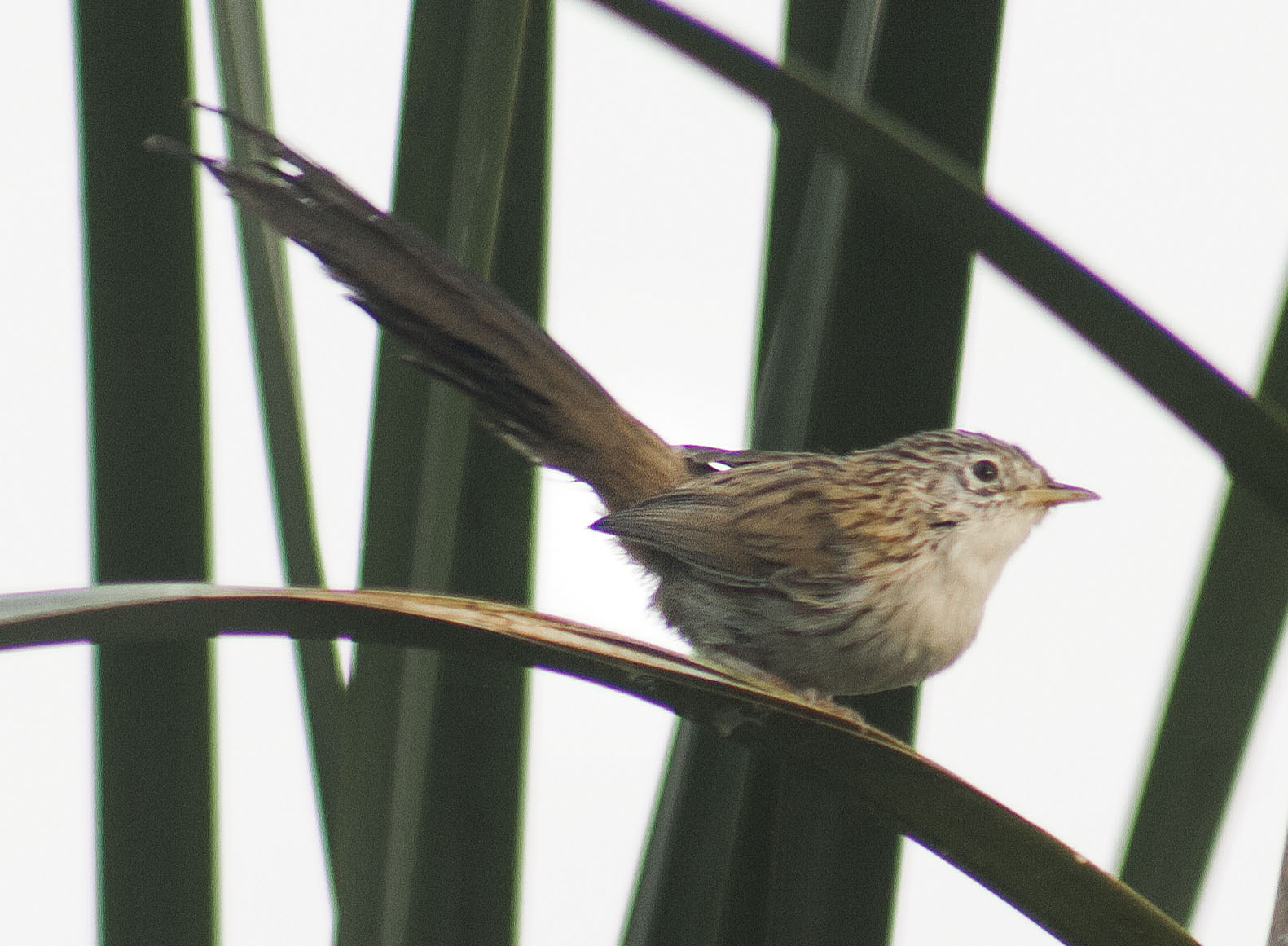
- Rufous-vented grass babbler, Laticilla burnesii

Scientific classification
- Kingdom: Animalia
- Phylum: Chordata
- Class: Aves
- Order: Passeriformes
- Family: Pellorneidae
- Genus: Laticilla; Blyth, 1845

Type species
- Eurycercus burnesii Blyth, 1844

= Laticilla =

Genus of birds

Laticilla is a genus of small passerine birds in the family Pellorneidae. Members of the genus are found in Pakistan, Nepal, India and Bangladesh.

A molecular phylogenetic study of the Cisticolidae published in 2013 found that the rufous-vented grass babbler did not lie within the clade containing the other prinias but instead belonged to the Pellorneidae. To create monophyletic genera, the rufous-vented prinia and the closely related swamp grass babbler were placed in the reintroduced genus Laticilla in the Pellorneidae. The genus Laticilla had been erected by the English zoologist Edward Blyth in 1845 with the rufous-vented prinia as the type species. The genus replaced Eurycercus that Blyth had introduced in 1844 only to subsequently discover that the name was preoccupied. The name Laticilla comes from the Latin latus for "wide" or "broad" and cilla for "tail".

== Species ==
The genus contains the following two species:

Image	Common name	Scientific name	Distribution
	Rufous-vented grass babbler	Laticilla burnesii	Pakistan, northwestern India and Nepal.
	Swamp grass babbler	Laticilla cinerascens	state of Assam, India, and in nearby parts of northern Bangladesh
