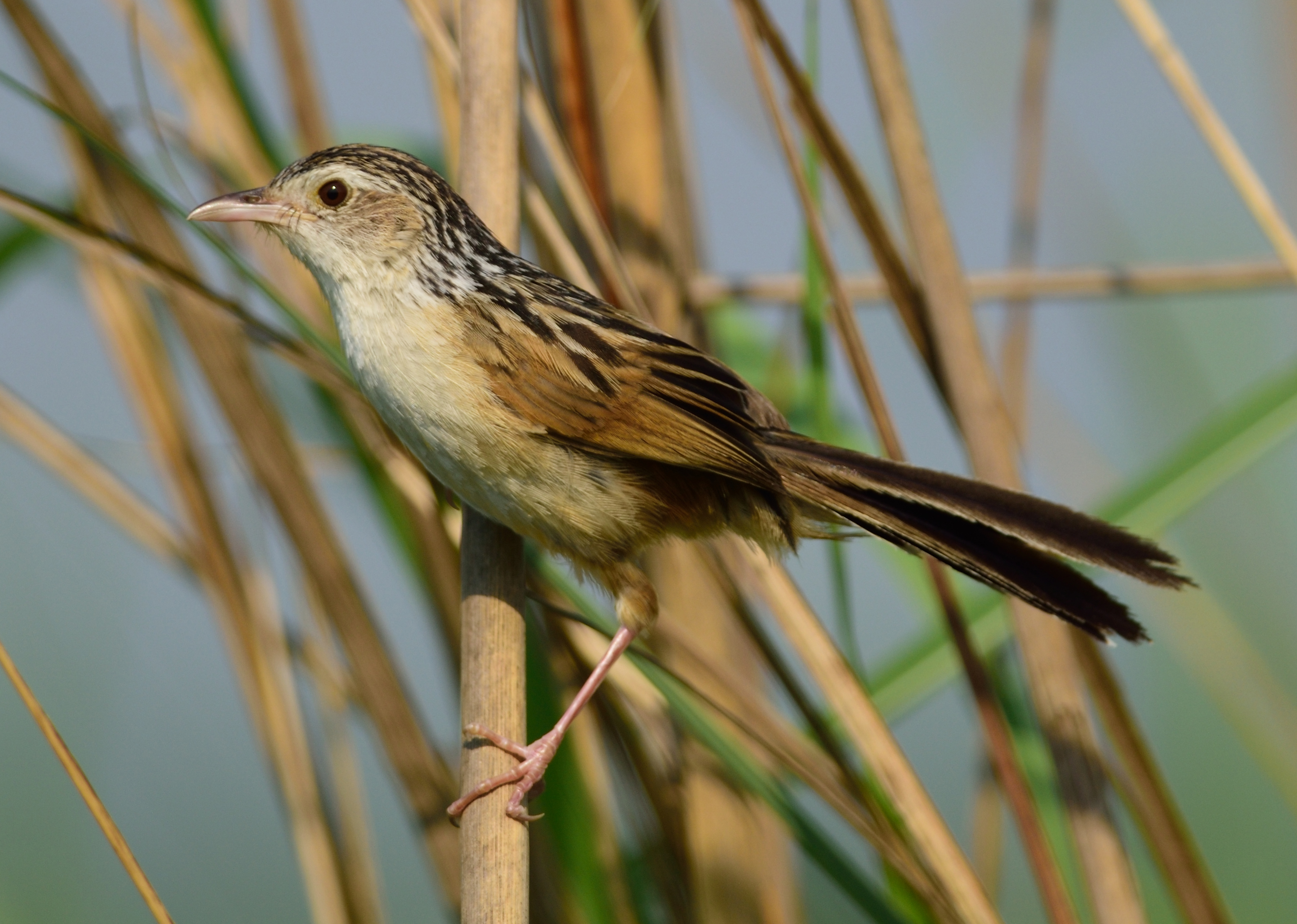

Scientific classification
- Kingdom: Animalia
- Phylum: Chordata
- Class: Aves
- Order: Passeriformes
- Family: Pellorneidae
- Genus: Graminicola; Jerdon, 1863

Type species
- Graminicola bengalensis

= Graminicola =

Genus of birds

Graminicola is a genus of passerine birds in the family Pellorneidae.

== Species ==
The genus contains the following two species:

Image	Common name	Scientific name	Distribution
	Indian grassbird	Graminicola bengalensis	Bangladesh, northern India, Bhutan and the Nepal
	Chinese grassbird	Graminicola striatus	southeastern China, Bangladesh, southeastern Myanmar, south-central Thailand, Cambodia, northeastern Vietnam, and Hainan Island
