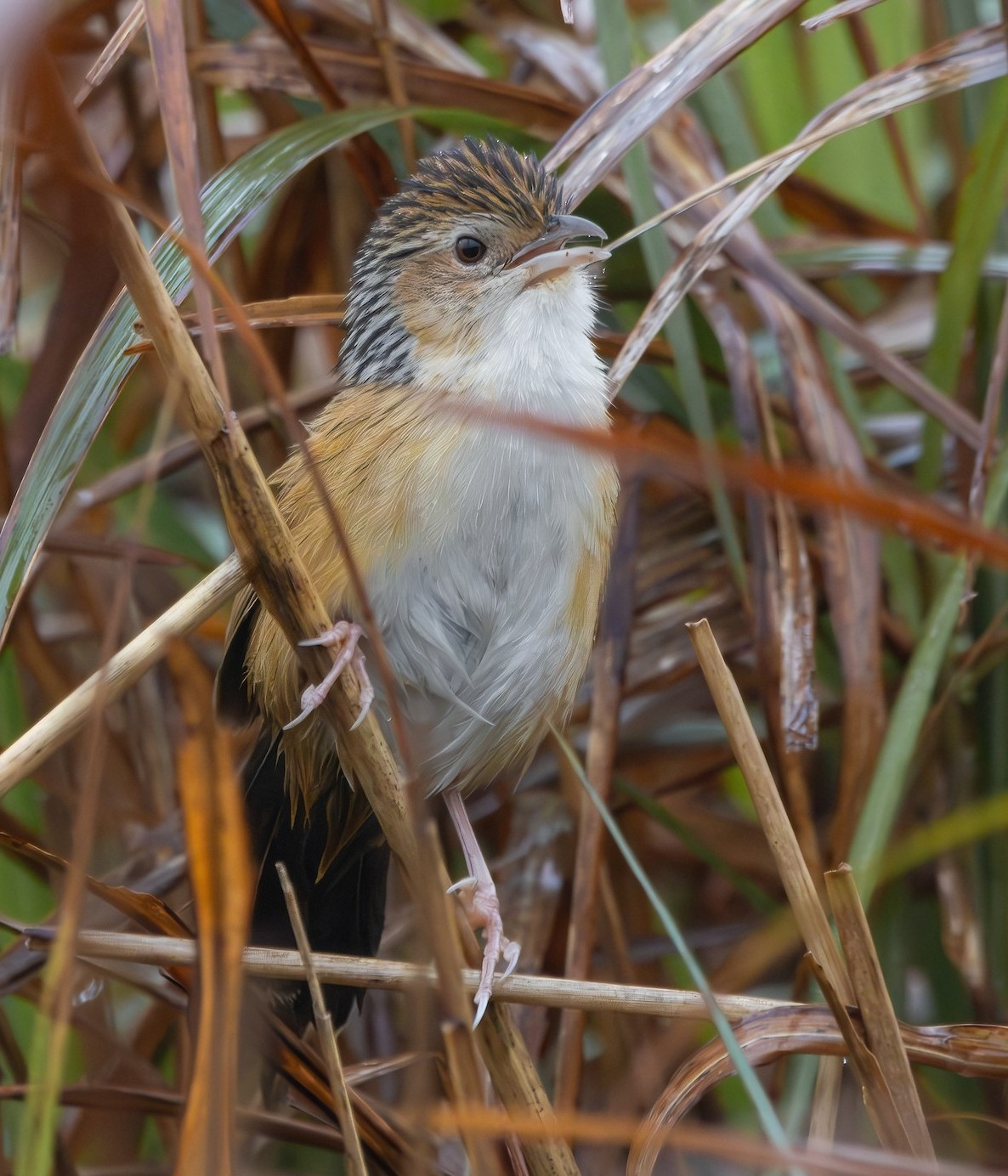

Conservation status
- Near Threatened (IUCN 3.1)

Scientific classification
- Kingdom: Animalia
- Phylum: Chordata
- Class: Aves
- Order: Passeriformes
- Family: Pellorneidae
- Genus: Graminicola
- Species: G. striatus

Binomial name
- Graminicola striatus Styan, 1892

= Chinese grassbird =

Species of bird

The Chinese grassbird (Graminicola striatus) is a bird species in the family Pellorneidae. It was formerly placed in the Old World warbler family Sylviidae and the babbler family Timaliidae.

== Distribution and habitat ==
It occurs in tall emergent vegetation in or bordering freshwater swamps or along banks of rivers in the lowlands of southeastern China, Bangladesh, southeastern Myanmar, Cambodia, northeastern Vietnam, and Hainan Island. It is threatened by habitat loss.
