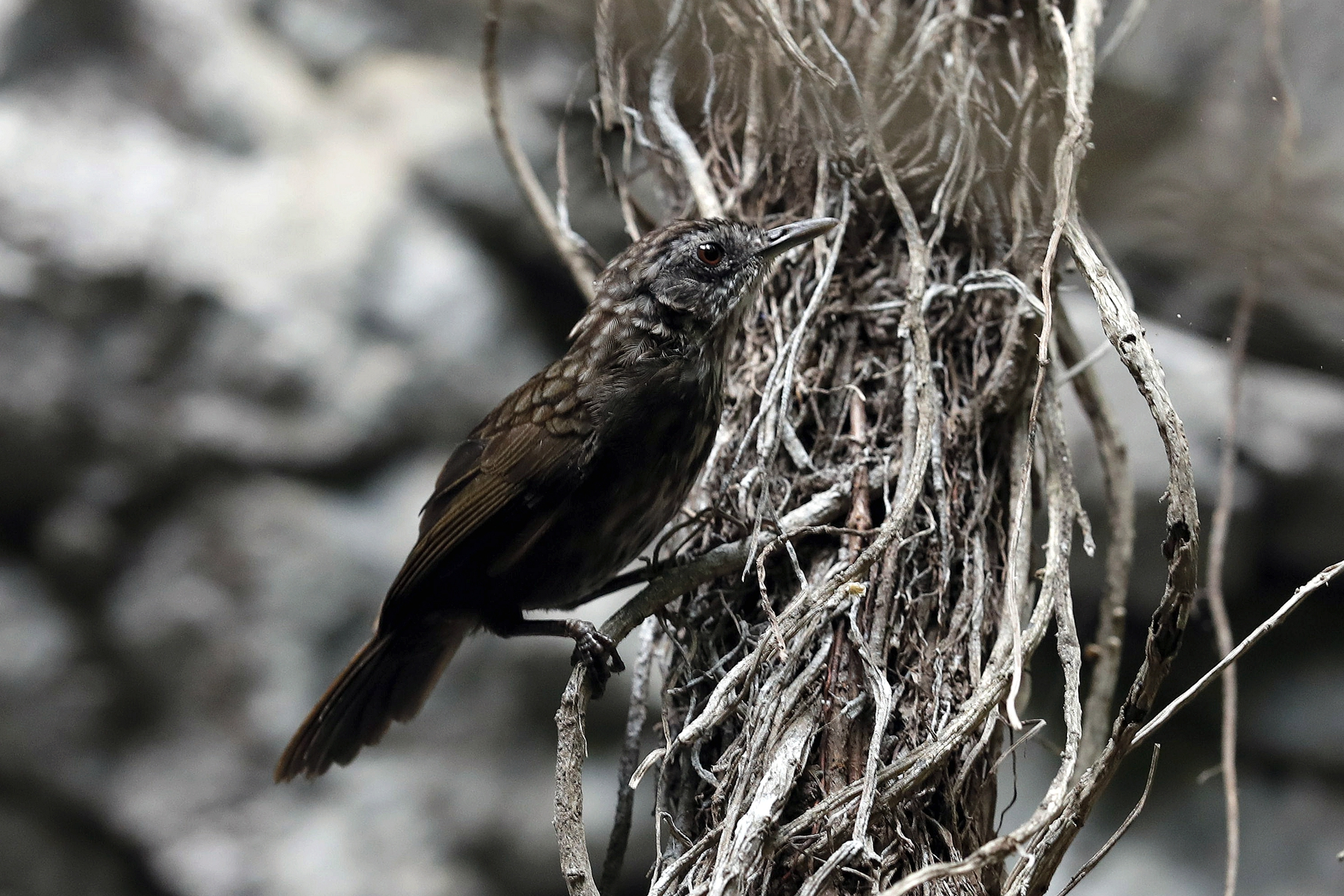

Conservation status
- Least Concern (IUCN 3.1)

Scientific classification
- Kingdom: Animalia
- Phylum: Chordata
- Class: Aves
- Order: Passeriformes
- Family: Pellorneidae
- Genus: Gypsophila
- Species: G. crispifrons

Binomial name
- Gypsophila crispifrons (Blyth, 1855)

= Variable limestone babbler =

Species of bird

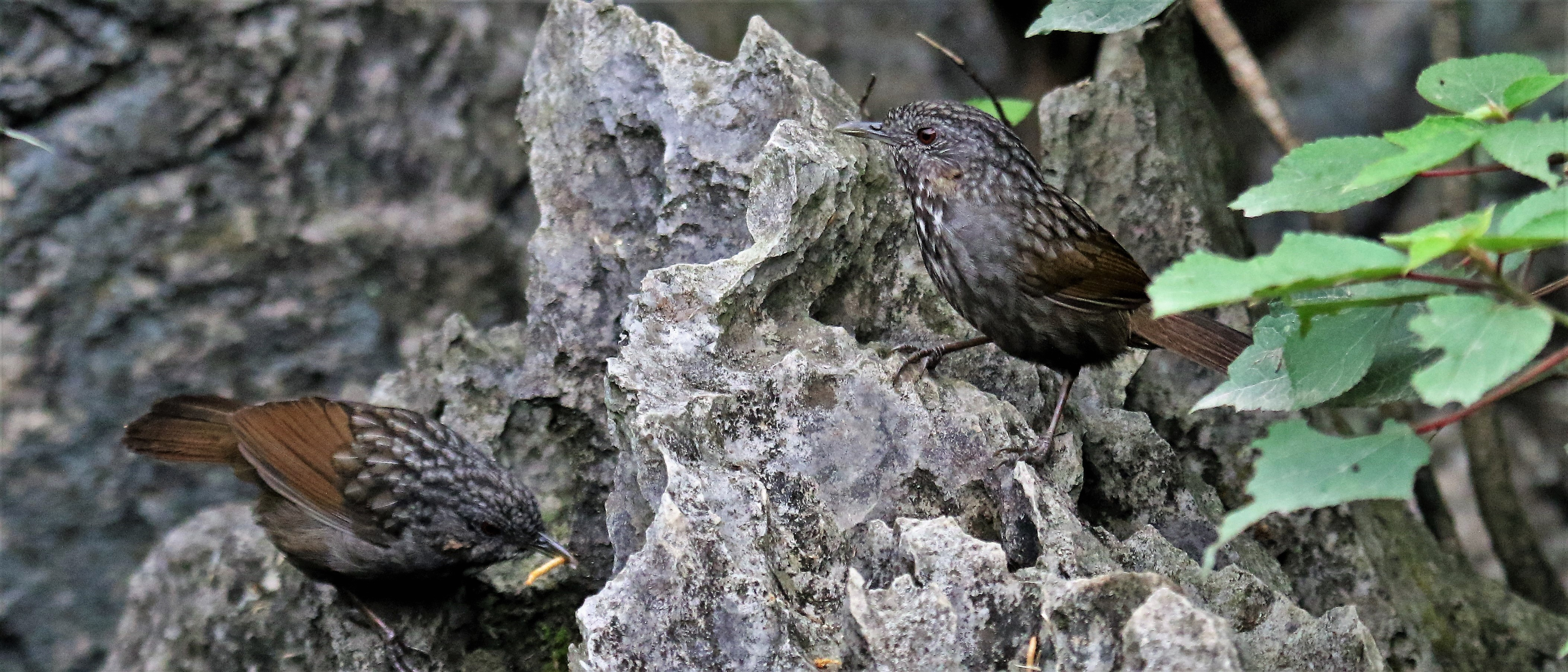
In Hà Nam Province, Vietnam

The variable limestone babbler (Gypsophila crispifrons) is a species of bird in the family Pellorneidae. It is found in the limestone hills of northern and eastern Thailand northwest to southern Myanmar. Two other Gypsophila species, the Annam limestone babbler (G. annamensis) and the rufous limestone babbler (G. calcicola) were previously considered subspecies of G. crispifrons, but a 2020 study found them to be distinct species.
