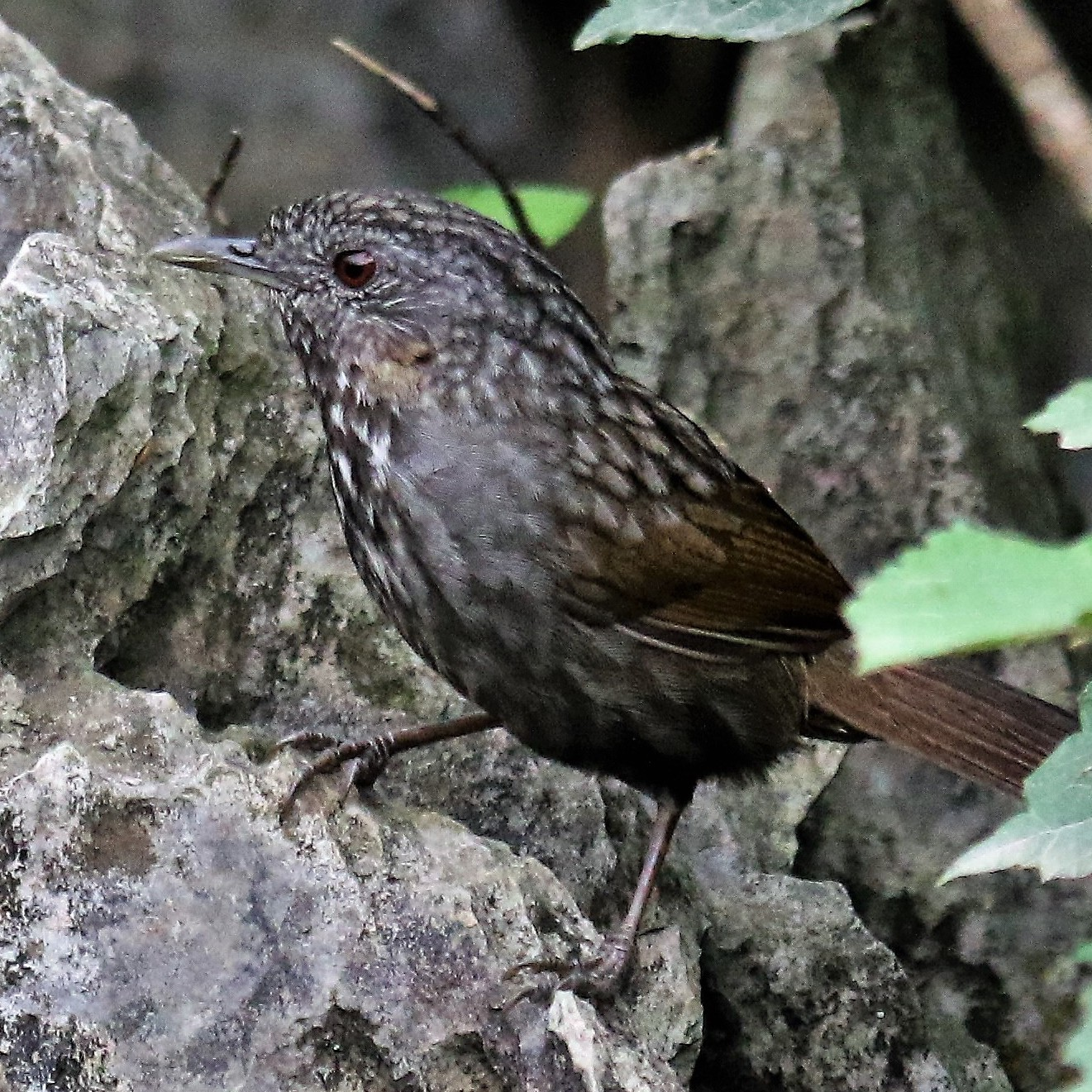
- From Hà Nam, Vietnam

Scientific classification
- Kingdom: Animalia
- Phylum: Chordata
- Class: Aves
- Order: Passeriformes
- Family: Pellorneidae
- Genus: Gypsophila
- Species: G. annamensis

Binomial name
- Gypsophila annamensis (Delacour & Jabouille, 1928)

= Annam limestone babbler =

Species of bird

The Annam limestone babbler (Gypsophila annamensis), also known as the khướu đá hoa in Vietnamese, is a species of bird in the family Pellorneidae. It is native to the limestone hills of northern Indochina. It was formerly considered a subspecies of the variable limestone babbler (G. crispifrons) but a 2020 study recovered it as a distinct species.

Its natural habitats are subtropical or tropical moist lowland forest and subtropical or tropical moist montane forest.
