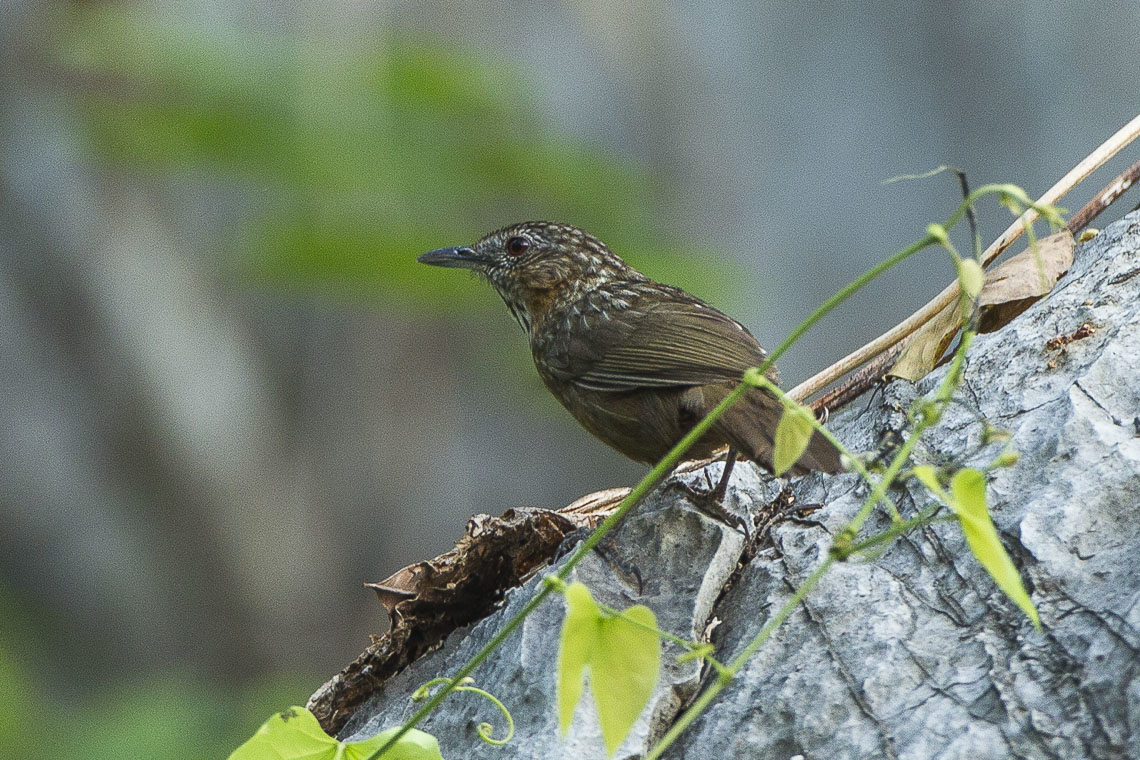

Scientific classification
- Domain: Eukaryota
- Kingdom: Animalia
- Phylum: Chordata
- Class: Aves
- Order: Passeriformes
- Family: Pellorneidae
- Genus: Gypsophila
- Species: G. calcicola

Binomial name
- Gypsophila calcicola (Deignan, 1939)

= Rufous limestone babbler =

Species of bird

The rufous limestone babbler (Gypsophila calcicola) is a species of bird in the family Pellorneidae. It is endemic to the limestone hills of central Thailand. It was formerly considered a subspecies of the variable limestone babbler (G. crispifrons) but a 2020 study recovered it as a distinct species.

Its natural habitats are subtropical or tropical moist lowland forest and subtropical or tropical moist montane forest.
