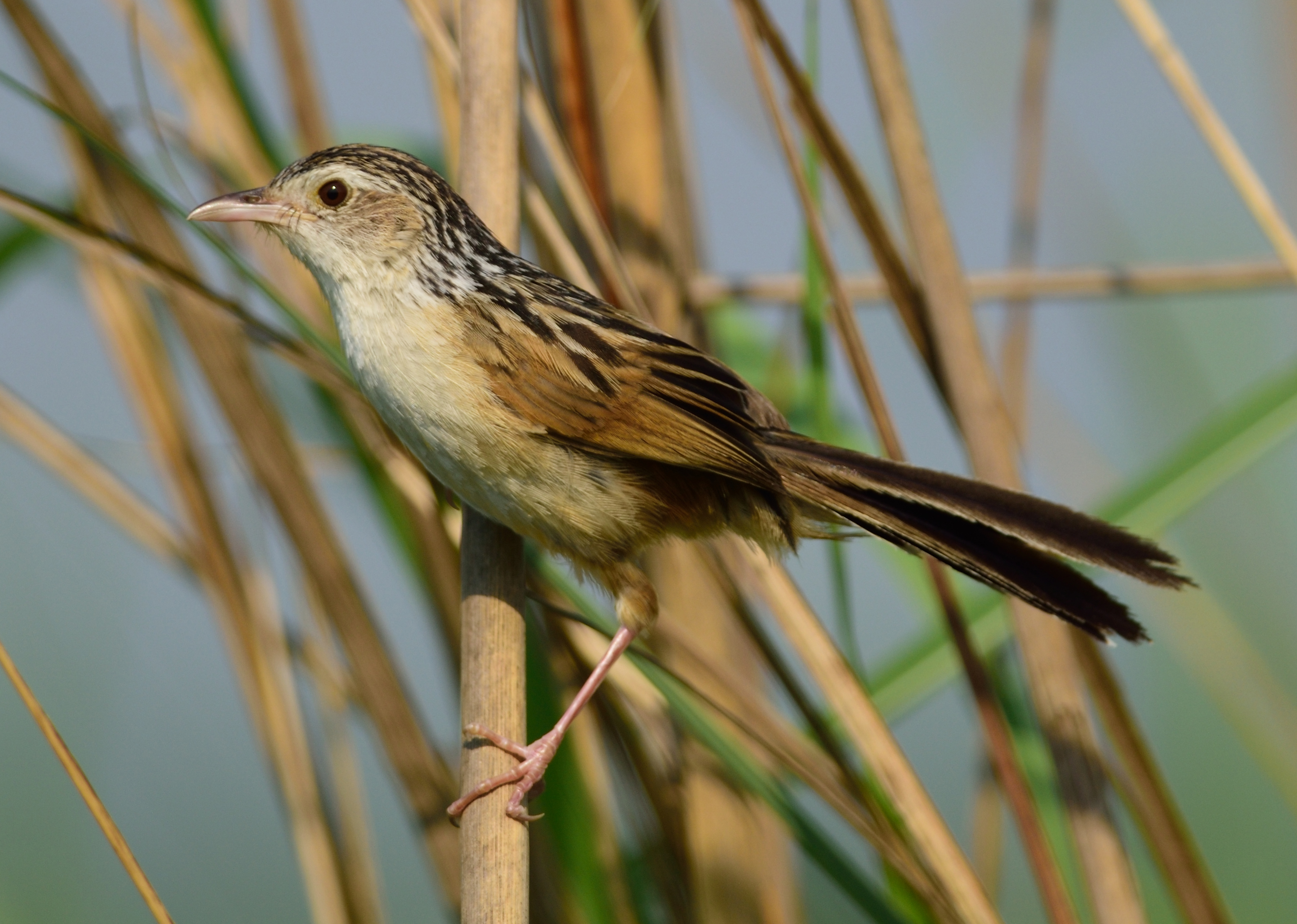
- in Chitwan National Park, Nepal

Conservation status
- Near Threatened (IUCN 3.1)

Scientific classification
- Kingdom: Animalia
- Phylum: Chordata
- Class: Aves
- Order: Passeriformes
- Family: Pellorneidae
- Genus: Graminicola
- Species: G. bengalensis

Binomial name
- Graminicola bengalensis Jerdon, 1863

= Indian grassbird =

Species of bird

The Indian grassbird (Graminicola bengalensis) is a passerine bird in the family Pellorneidae. It was formerly placed in the Old World warbler family, Sylviidae, and the Old World babbler family, Timaliidae. The species is also known as the rufous-rumped grassbird.

== Distribution and habitat ==
It occurs in tall emergent vegetation in or bordering freshwater swamps or along banks of rivers in the lowlands of Bangladesh, northern India, Bhutan and the Chitwan National Park of Nepal. It is threatened by habitat loss.

The Sukla Phanta Wildlife Reserve in Nepal represents the western limit of its distribution.
