= Elephant grass =

The term Elephant grass may refer to the following grass species:

- The Asian Miscanthus giganteus, also known as giant miscanthus, commonly used as a biomass crop
- The African Cenchrus purpureus, also known as Napier grass, Uganda grass or giant king grass
- The Asian Arundo donax, also known as giant cane, giant reed
- The Eurasian Saccharum ravennae, also known as ravennagrass or ekra
