= List of birds of Brunei =

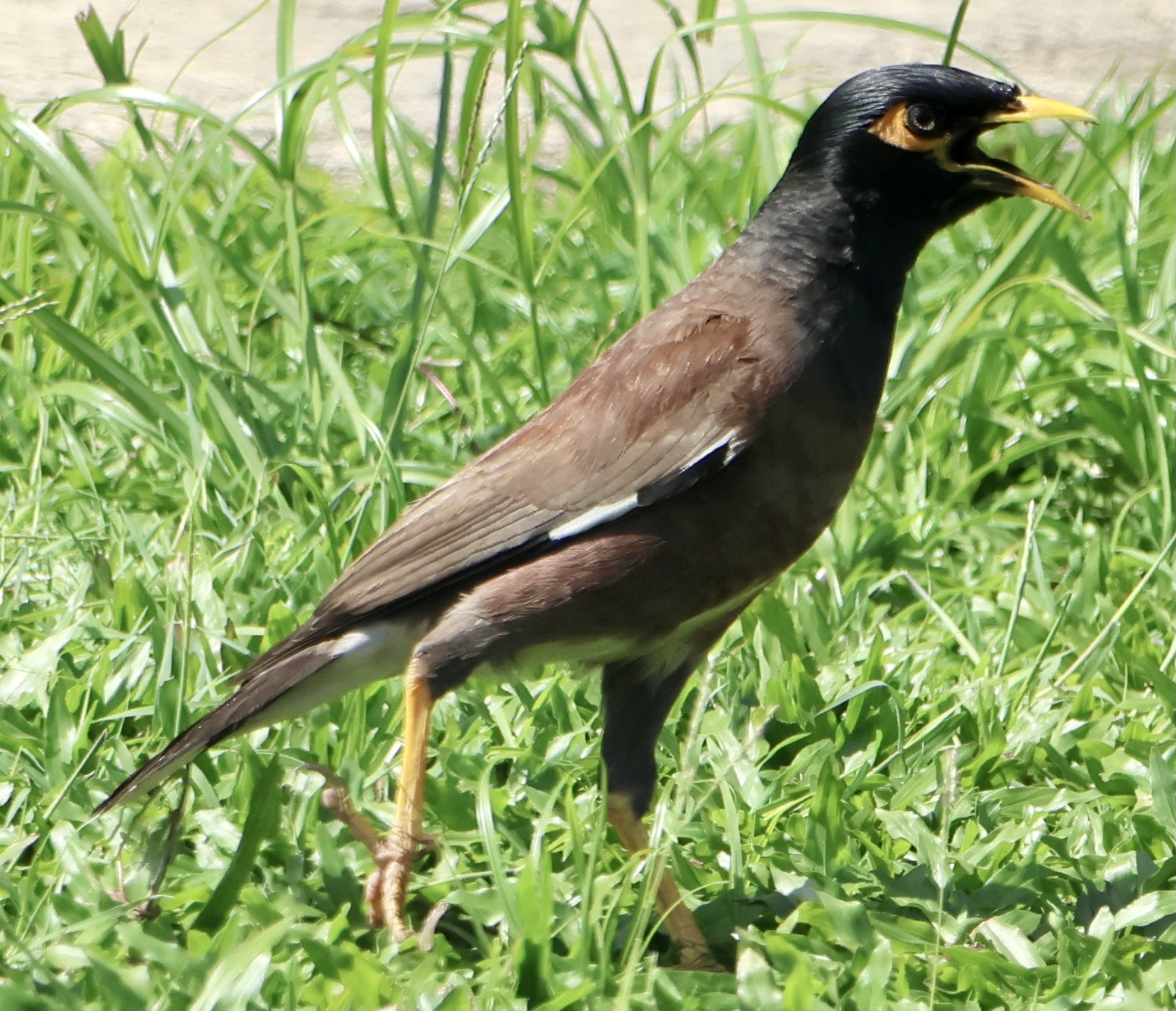
Common myna

This is a list of the bird species recorded in Brunei. The avifauna of Brunei include a total of 507 species, of which 5 have been introduced by humans.

This list's taxonomic treatment (designation and sequence of orders, families and species) and nomenclature (common and scientific names) follow the conventions of The Clements Checklist of the Birds of the World, 2022 edition. The family accounts at the beginning of each heading reflect this taxonomy, as do the species counts found in each family account. Introduced and accidental species are included in the total counts for Brunei.

The following tags have been used to highlight several categories, but not all species fall into one of these categories. Those that do not are commonly occurring native species.

- (A) Accidental - a species that rarely or accidentally occurs in Brunei
- (E) Endemic - a species endemic to Brunei
- (I) Introduced - a species introduced to Brunei as a consequence, direct or indirect, of human actions

== Ducks, geese, and waterfowl ==
Order: Anseriformes Family: Anatidae

Anatidae includes the ducks and most duck-like waterfowl, such as geese and swans. These birds are adapted to an aquatic existence with webbed feet, flattened bills, and feathers that are excellent at shedding water due to an oily coating.

- Wandering whistling-duck, Dendrocygna arcuata
- Lesser whistling-duck, Dendrocygna javanica
- Garganey, Spatula querquedula
- Northern shoveler, Spatula clypeata
- Mallard, Anas platyrhynchos
- Northern pintail, Anas acuta
- Green-winged teal, Anas crecca
- Tufted duck, Aythya fuligula

== Megapodes ==
Order: Galliformes Family: Megapodiidae

The Megapodiidae are stocky, medium-large chicken-like birds with small heads and large feet. All but the malleefowl occupy jungle habitats and most have brown or black coloring.

- Tabon scrubfowl, Megapodius cumingii

== Pheasants, grouse, and allies ==
Order: Galliformes Family: Phasianidae

The Phasianidae are a family of terrestrial birds which consists of quails, partridges, snowcocks, francolins, spurfowls, tragopans, monals, pheasants, peafowls and jungle fowls. In general, they are plump (although they vary in size) and have broad, relatively short wings.

- Crested partridge, Rollulus rouloul
- Black partridge, Melanoperdix nigra
- Bulwer's pheasant, Lophura bulweri
- Bornean crestless fireback, Lophura pyronota
- Bornean crested fireback, Lophura ignita
- Great argus, Argusianus argus
- Blue-breasted quail, Synoicus chinensis

== Pigeons and doves ==
Order: Columbiformes Family: Columbidae

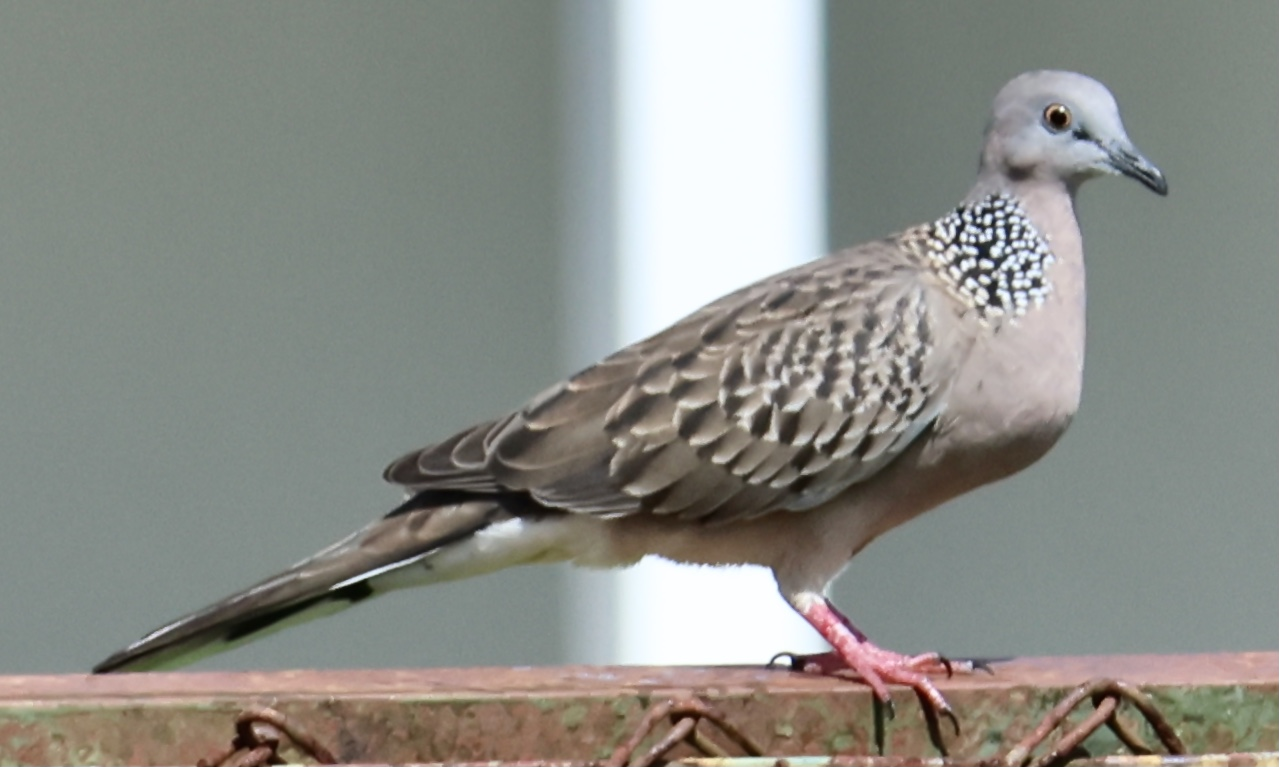
Spotted dove

Pigeons and doves are stout-bodied birds with short necks and short slender bills with a fleshy cere.

- Rock pigeon, Columba livia (I)
- Metallic pigeon, Columba vitiensis
- Philippine collared-dove, Streptopelia dusumieri (A)
- Spotted dove, Streptopelia chinensis
- Philippine cuckoo-dove, Macropygia tenuirostris
- Little cuckoo-dove, Macropygia ruficeps
- Asian emerald dove, Chalcophaps indica
- Zebra dove, Geopelia striata
- Nicobar pigeon, Caloenas nicobarica
- Little green-pigeon, Treron olax
- Pink-necked green-pigeon, Treron vernans
- Cinnamon-headed green-pigeon, Treron fulvicollis
- Thick-billed green-pigeon, Treron curvirostra
- Large green-pigeon, Treron capellei
- Jambu fruit-dove, Ptilinopus jambu
- Green imperial-pigeon, Ducula aenea
- Mountain imperial-pigeon, Ducula badia
- Pied imperial-pigeon, Ducula bicolor

== Cuckoos ==
Order: Cuculiformes Family: Cuculidae

The family Cuculidae includes cuckoos, roadrunners and anis. These birds are of variable size with slender bodies, long tails and strong legs.

- Bornean ground-cuckoo, Carpococcyx radiatus
- Short-toed coucal, Centropus rectunguis
- Greater coucal, Centropus sinensis
- Lesser coucal, Centropus bengalensis
- Raffles's malkoha, Rhinortha chlorophaea
- Red-billed malkoha, Zanclostomus javanicus
- Chestnut-breasted malkoha, Phaenicophaeus curvirostris
- Chestnut-bellied malkoha, Phaenicophaeus sumatranus
- Black-bellied malkoha, Phaenicophaeus diardi
- Asian koel, Eudynamys scolopacea
- Violet cuckoo, Chrysococcyx xanthorhynchus
- Horsfield's bronze-cuckoo, Chrysococcyx basalis
- Little bronze-cuckoo, Chrysococcyx minutillus
- Banded bay cuckoo, Cacomantis sonneratii
- Plaintive cuckoo, Cacomantis merulinus
- Brush cuckoo, Cacomantis variolosus
- Square-tailed drongo-cuckoo, Surniculus lugubris
- Moustached hawk-cuckoo, Hierococcyx vagans
- Dark hawk-cuckoo, Hierococcyx bocki
- Malaysian hawk-cuckoo, Hierococcyx fugax
- Indian cuckoo, Cuculus micropterus
- Himalayan cuckoo, Cuculus saturatus

== Frogmouths ==
Order: Caprimulgiformes Family: Podargidae

The frogmouths are a group of nocturnal birds related to the nightjars. They are named for their large flattened hooked bill and huge frog-like gape, which they use to take insects.

- Large frogmouth, Batrachostomus auritus
- Gould's frogmouth, Batrachostomus stellatus
- Bornean frogmouth, Batrachostomus mixtus
- Blyth's frogmouth, Batrachostomus affinis
- Sunda frogmouth, Batrachostomus cornutus

== Nightjars and allies ==
Order: Caprimulgiformes Family: Caprimulgidae

Nightjars are medium-sized nocturnal birds which usually nest on the ground. They have long wings, short legs and very short bills. Most have small feet, of little use for walking, and long pointed wings. Their soft plumage is camouflaged to resemble bark or leaves.

- Malaysian eared-nightjar, Lyncornis temminckii
- Gray nightjar, Caprimulgus jotaka
- Large-tailed nightjar, Caprimulgus macrurus
- Savanna nightjar, Caprimulgus affinis
- Bonaparte's nightjar, Caprimulgus concretus

== Swifts ==
Order: Caprimulgiformes Family: Apodidae

Swifts are small birds which spend the majority of their lives flying. These birds have very short legs and never settle voluntarily on the ground, perching instead only on vertical surfaces. Many swifts have long swept-back wings which resemble a crescent or boomerang.

- Silver-rumped needletail, Rhaphidura leucopygialis
- White-throated needletail, Hirundapus caudacutus
- Brown-backed needletail, Hirundapus giganteus
- Waterfall swift, Hydrochous gigas (A)
- Plume-toed swiftlet, Collocalia affinis
- Ameline swiftlet, Aerodramus amelis
- Mossy-nest swiftlet, Aerodramus salangana
- Black-nest swiftlet, Aerodramus maximus
- White-nest swiftlet, Aerodramus fuciphagus
- Pacific swift, Apus pacificus
- House swift, Apus nipalensis
- Asian palm-swift, Cypsiurus balasiensis

== Treeswifts ==
Order: Caprimulgiformes Family: Hemiprocnidae

The treeswifts, also called crested swifts, are closely related to the true swifts. They differ from the other swifts in that they have crests, long forked tails and softer plumage.

- Gray-rumped treeswift, Hemiprocne longipennis
- Whiskered treeswift, Hemiprocne comata

== Rails, gallinules, and coots ==
Order: Gruiformes Family: Rallidae

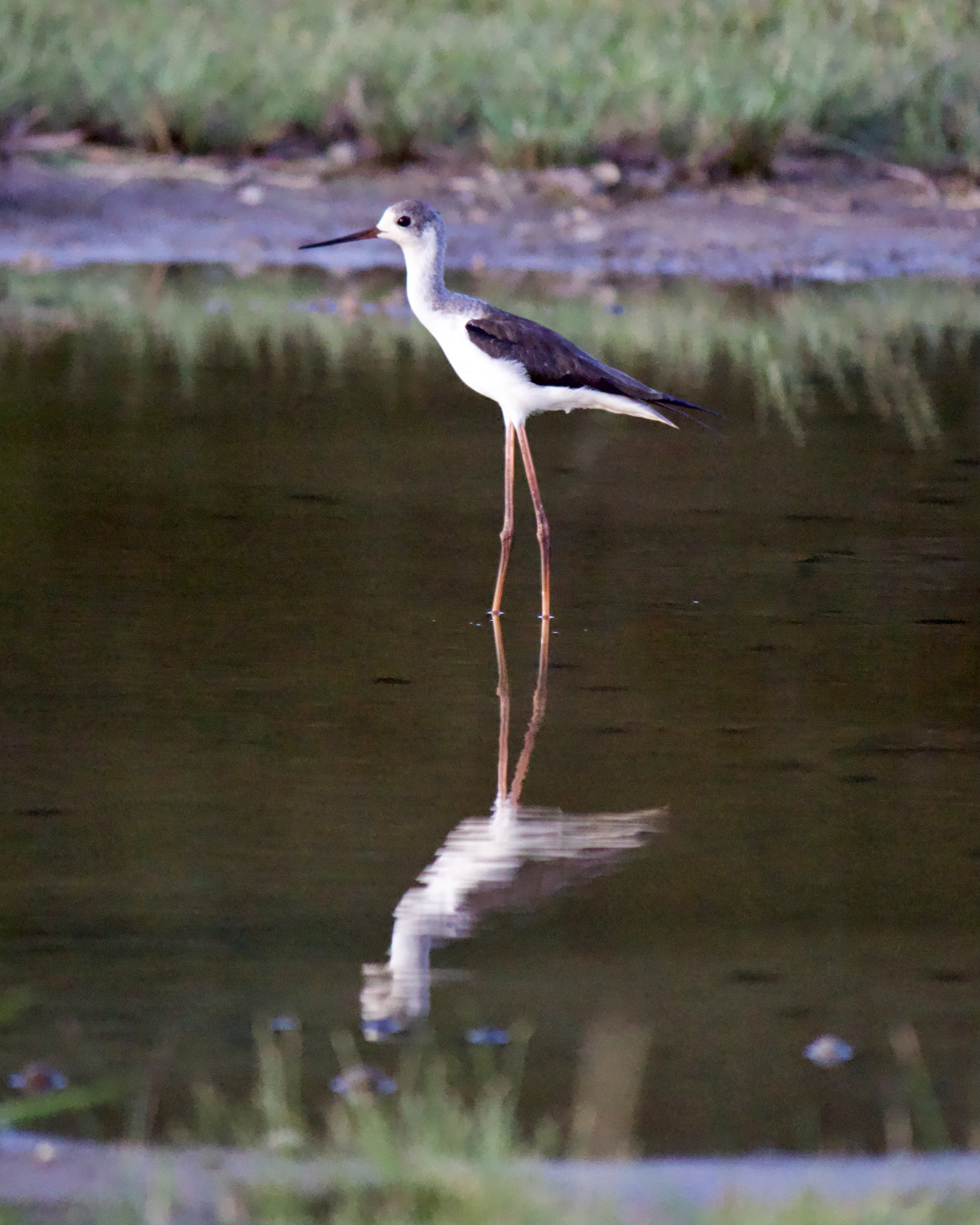
White-breasted waterhen

Rallidae is a large family of small to medium-sized birds which includes the rails, crakes, coots and gallinules. Typically they inhabit dense vegetation in damp environments near lakes, swamps or rivers. In general they are shy and secretive birds, making them difficult to observe. Most species have strong legs and long toes which are well adapted to soft uneven surfaces. They tend to have short, rounded wings and to be weak fliers.

- Brown-cheeked rail, Rallus indicus (A)
- Slaty-breasted rail, Lewinia striata
- Eurasian moorhen, Gallinula chloropus
- Eurasian coot, Fulica atra
- White-browed crake, Poliolimnas cinereus
- Watercock, Gallicrex cinerea
- White-breasted waterhen, Amaurornis phoenicurus
- Red-legged crake, Rallina fasciata
- Slaty-legged crake, Rallina eurizonoides (A)
- Baillon's crake, Zapornia pusilla

== Cranes ==
Order: Gruiformes Family: Gruidae

Cranes are large, long-legged and long-necked birds. Unlike the similar-looking but unrelated herons, cranes fly with necks outstretched, not pulled back. Most have elaborate and noisy courting displays or "dances".

- Sarus crane, Antigone antigone

== Thick-knees ==
Order: Charadriiformes Family: Burhinidae

The thick-knees are a group of largely tropical waders in the family Burhinidae. They are found worldwide within the tropical zone, with some species also breeding in the temperate zones Europe and Australia. They are medium to large waders with strong black or yellow-black bills, large yellow eyes and cryptic plumage. Despite being classed as waders, most species have a preference for arid or semi-arid habitats.

- Beach thick-knee, Esacus magnirostris

== Stilts and avocets ==
Order: Charadriiformes Family: Recurvirostridae

Recurvirostridae is a family of large wading birds, which includes the avocets and stilts. The avocets have long legs and long up-curved bills. The stilts have extremely long legs and long, thin, straight bills.

- Black-winged stilt, Himantopus himantopus (A)
- Pied stilt, Himantopus leucocephalus

== Plovers and lapwings ==
Order: Charadriiformes Family: Charadriidae

The family Charadriidae includes the plovers, dotterels and lapwings. They are small to medium-sized birds with compact bodies, short, thick necks and long, usually pointed, wings. They are found in open country worldwide, mostly in habitats near water.

- Black-bellied plover, Pluvialis squatarola
- Pacific golden-plover, Pluvialis fulva
- Northern lapwing, Vanellus vanellus
- Gray-headed lapwing, Vanellus cinereus
- Lesser sand-plover, Charadrius mongolus
- Greater sand-plover, Charadrius leschenaultii
- Malaysian plover, Charadrius peronii
- Kentish plover, Charadrius alexandrinus
- White-faced plover, Charadrius dealbatus
- Common ringed plover, Charadrius hiaticula
- Long-billed plover, Charadrius placidus
- Little ringed plover, Charadrius dubius
- Oriental plover, Charadrius veredus

== Painted-snipes ==
Order: Charadriiformes Family: Rostratulidae

Painted-snipes are short-legged, long-billed birds similar in shape to the true snipes, but more brightly colored.

- Greater painted-snipe, Rostratula benghalensis

== Sandpipers and allies ==
Order: Charadriiformes Family: Scolopacidae

Scolopacidae is a large diverse family of small to medium-sized shorebirds including the sandpipers, curlews, godwits, shanks, tattlers, woodcocks, snipes, dowitchers and phalaropes. The majority of these species eat small invertebrates picked out of the mud or soil. Variation in length of legs and bills enables multiple species to feed in the same habitat, particularly on the coast, without direct competition for food.

- Whimbrel, Numenius phaeopus
- Little curlew, Numenius minutus
- Far Eastern curlew, Numenius madagascariensis
- Eurasian curlew, Numenius arquata
- Bar-tailed godwit, Limosa lapponica
- Black-tailed godwit, Limosa limosa
- Ruddy turnstone, Arenaria interpres
- Great knot, Calidris tenuirostris
- Red knot, Calidris canutus
- Ruff, Calidris pugnax
- Broad-billed sandpiper, Calidris falcinellus
- Sharp-tailed sandpiper, Calidris acuminata
- Curlew sandpiper, Calidris ferruginea
- Temminck's stint, Calidris temminckii
- Long-toed stint, Calidris subminuta
- Red-necked stint, Calidris ruficollis
- Sanderling, Calidris alba
- Dunlin, Calidris alpina (A)
- Little stint, Calidris minuta
- Asian dowitcher, Limnodromus semipalmatus
- Long-billed dowitcher, Limnodromus scolopaceus (A)
- Eurasian woodcock, Scolopax rusticola
- Common snipe, Gallinago gallinago
- Pin-tailed snipe, Gallinago stenura
- Swinhoe's snipe, Gallinago megala
- Terek sandpiper, Xenus cinereus
- Red-necked phalarope, Phalaropus lobatus (A)
- Common sandpiper, Actitis hypoleucos
- Green sandpiper, Tringa ochropus
- Gray-tailed tattler, Tringa brevipes
- Spotted redshank, Tringa erythropus (A)
- Common greenshank, Tringa nebularia
- Marsh sandpiper, Tringa stagnatilis
- Wood sandpiper, Tringa glareola
- Common redshank, Tringa totanus

== Pratincoles and coursers ==
Order: Charadriiformes Family: Glareolidae

Glareolidae is a family of wading birds comprising the pratincoles, which have short legs, long pointed wings and long forked tails, and the coursers, which have long legs, short wings and long, pointed bills which curve downwards.

- Oriental pratincole, Glareola maldivarum

== Skuas and jaegers ==
Order: Charadriiformes Family: Stercorariidae

The family Stercorariidae are, in general, medium to large birds, typically with gray or brown plumage, often with white markings on the wings. They nest on the ground in temperate and arctic regions and are long-distance migrants.

- Pomarine jaeger, Stercorarius pomarinus

== Gulls, terns, and skimmers ==
Order: Charadriiformes Family: Laridae

Laridae is a family of medium to large seabirds, the gulls, terns and skimmers. Gulls are typically gray or white, often with black markings on the head or wings. They have stout, longish bills and webbed feet. Terns are a group of generally medium to large seabirds typically with gray or white plumage, often with black markings on the head. Most terns hunt fish by diving but some pick insects off the surface of fresh water. Terns are generally long-lived birds, with several species known to live in excess of 30 years.

- Black-headed gull, Chroicocephalus ridibundus
- Brown noddy, Anous stolidus
- Bridled tern, Onychoprion anaethetus
- Little tern, Sternula albifrons
- Gull-billed tern, Gelochelidon nilotica
- Caspian tern, Hydroprogne caspia
- White-winged tern, Chlidonias leucopterus
- Whiskered tern, Chlidonias hybrida
- Roseate tern, Sterna dougallii
- Black-naped tern, Sterna sumatrana
- Common tern, Sterna hirundo
- Great crested tern, Thalasseus bergii
- Lesser crested tern, Thalasseus bengalensis

== Shearwaters and petrels ==
Order: Procellariiformes Family: Procellariidae

The procellariids are the main group of medium-sized "true petrels", characterized by united nostrils with medium septum and a long outer functional primary.

- Streaked shearwater, Calonectris leucomelas (A)

== Storks ==
Order: Ciconiiformes Family: Ciconiidae

Storks are large, long-legged, long-necked, wading birds with long, stout bills. Storks are mute, but bill-clattering is an important mode of communication at the nest. Their nests can be large and may be reused for many years. Many species are migratory.

- Storm's stork, Ciconia stormi
- Lesser adjutant, Leptoptilos javanicus

== Frigatebirds ==
Order: Suliformes Family: Fregatidae

Frigatebirds are large seabirds usually found over tropical oceans. They are large, black-and-white or completely black, with long wings and deeply forked tails. The males have colored inflatable throat pouches. They do not swim or walk and cannot take off from a flat surface. Having the largest wingspan-to-body-weight ratio of any bird, they are essentially aerial, able to stay aloft for more than a week.

- Lesser frigatebird, Fregata ariel
- Christmas Island frigatebird, Fregata andrewsi
- Great frigatebird, Fregata minor

== Boobies and gannets ==
Order: Suliformes Family: Sulidae

The sulids comprise the gannets and boobies. Both groups are medium to large coastal seabirds that plunge-dive for fish.

- Brown booby, Sula leucogaster
- Red-footed booby, Sula sula

== Anhingas ==
Order: Suliformes Family: Anhingidae

Anhingas or darters are often called "snake-birds" because of their long thin neck, which gives a snake-like appearance when they swim with their bodies submerged. The males have black and dark-brown plumage, an erectile crest on the nape and a larger bill than the female. The females have much paler plumage especially on the neck and underparts. The darters have completely webbed feet and their legs are short and set far back on the body. Their plumage is somewhat permeable, like that of cormorants, and they spread their wings to dry after diving.

- Oriental darter, Anhinga melanogaster

== Cormorants and shags ==
Order: Suliformes Family: Phalacrocoracidae

Phalacrocoracidae is a family of medium to large coastal, fish-eating seabirds that includes cormorants and shags. Plumage coloration varies, with the majority having mainly dark plumage, some species being black-and-white and a few being colorful.

- Great cormorant, Phalacrocorax carbo

== Herons, egrets, and bitterns ==
Order: Pelecaniformes Family: Ardeidae

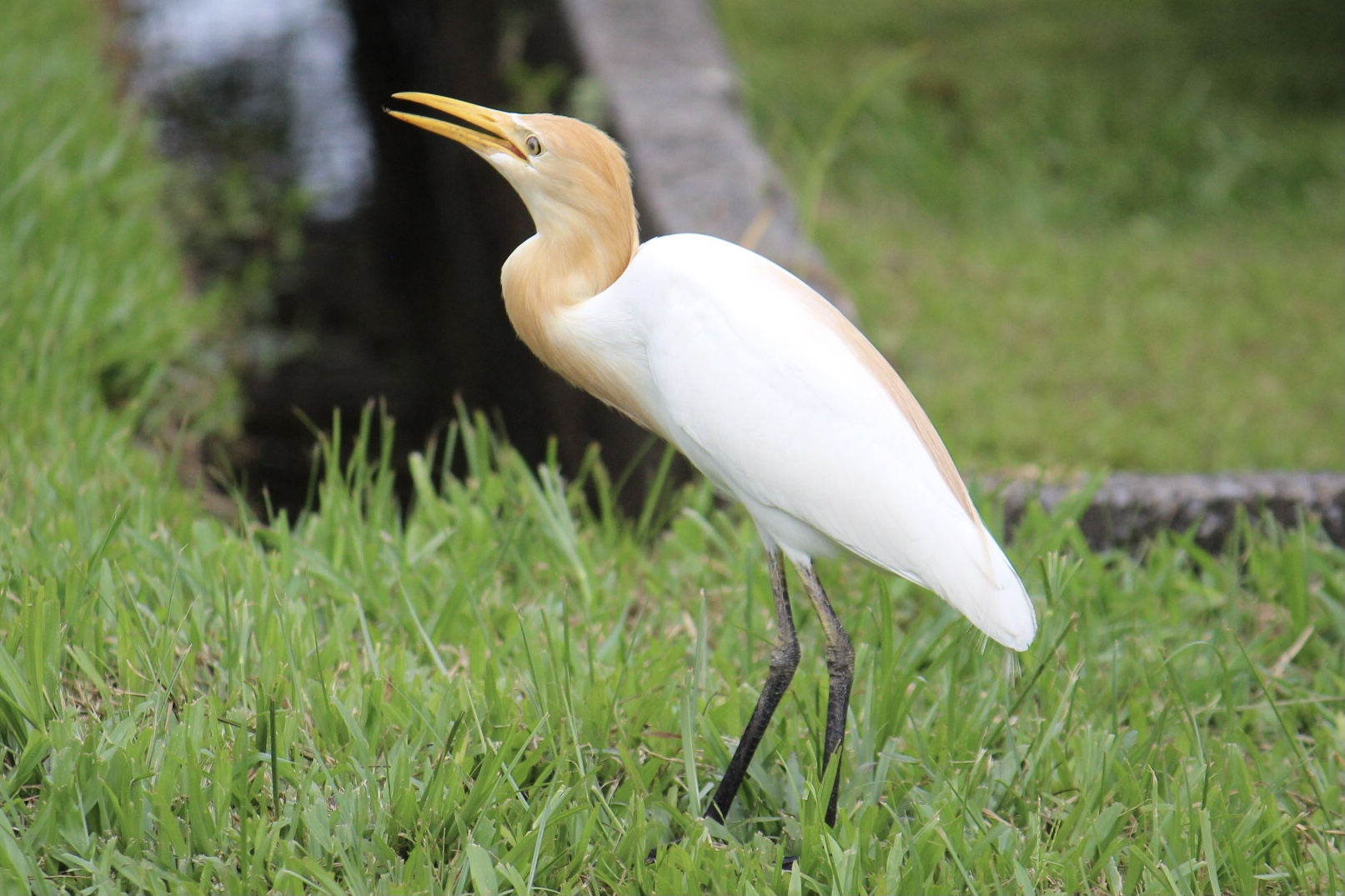
Cattle egret

The family Ardeidae contains the bitterns, heron, and egrets. Herons and egrets are medium to large wading birds with long necks and legs. Bitterns tend to be shorter necked and more wary. Members of Ardeidae fly with their necks retracted, unlike other long-necked birds such as storks, ibises and spoonbills.

- Great bittern, Botaurus stellaris
- Yellow bittern, Ixobrychus sinensis
- Schrenck's bittern, Ixobrychus eurhythmus
- Cinnamon bittern, Ixobrychus cinnamomeus
- Black bittern, Ixobrychus flavicollis
- Gray heron, Ardea cinerea
- Great-billed heron, Ardea sumatrana
- Purple heron, Ardea purpurea
- Great egret, Ardea alba
- Intermediate egret, Ardea intermedia
- Chinese egret, Egretta eulophotes
- Little egret, Egretta garzetta
- Pacific reef-heron, Egretta sacra
- Eastern cattle egret, Ardea coromanda
- Chinese pond-heron, Ardeola bacchus
- Striated heron, Butorides striata
- Black-crowned night-heron, Nycticorax nycticorax
- Nankeen night-heron, Nycticorax caledonicus (A)
- Japanese night-heron, Gorsachius goisagi
- Malayan night-heron, Gorsachius melanolophus

== Ibises and spoonbills ==
Order: Pelecaniformes Family: Threskiornithidae

Threskiornithidae is a family of large terrestrial and wading birds which includes the ibises and spoonbills. They have long, broad wings with 11 primary and about 20 secondary feathers. They are strong fliers and despite their size and weight, very capable soarers.

- Black-faced spoonbill, Platalea minor

== Osprey ==
Order: Accipitriformes Family: Pandionidae

The family Pandionidae contains only one species, the osprey. The osprey is a medium-large raptor which is a specialist fish-eater with a worldwide distribution.

- Osprey, Pandion haliaetus

== Hawks, eagles, and kites ==
Order: Accipitriformes Family: Accipitridae

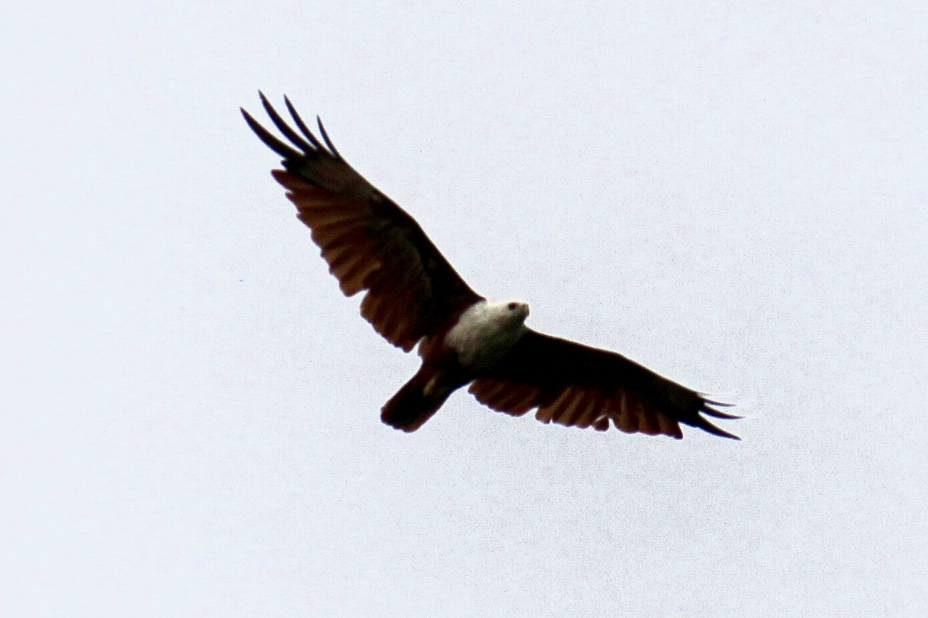
Brahminy kite

Accipitridae is a family of birds of prey, which includes hawks, eagles, kites, harriers, and Old World vultures. These birds have powerful hooked beaks for tearing flesh from their prey, strong legs, powerful talons and keen eyesight.

- Black-winged kite, Elanus caeruleus
- Oriental honey-buzzard, Pernis ptilorhynchus
- Jerdon's baza, Aviceda jerdoni
- White-rumped vulture, Gyps bengalensis
- Mountain serpent-eagle, Spilornis kinabaluensis
- Crested serpent-eagle, Spilornis cheela
- Bat hawk, Macheiramphus alcinus
- Changeable hawk-eagle, Nisaetus cirrhatus
- Blyth's hawk-eagle, Nisaetus alboniger
- Wallace's hawk-eagle, Nisaetus nanus
- Rufous-bellied eagle, Lophotriorchis kienerii
- Black eagle, Ictinaetus malaiensis
- Gray-faced buzzard, Butastur indicus
- Eastern marsh-harrier, Circus spilonotus
- Hen harrier, Circus cyaneus
- Pied harrier, Circus melanoleucos
- Crested goshawk, Accipiter trivirgatus
- Chinese sparrowhawk, Accipiter soloensis
- Japanese sparrowhawk, Accipiter gularis
- Besra, Accipiter virgatus
- Eurasian sparrowhawk, Accipiter nisus (A)
- Black kite, Milvus migrans
- Brahminy kite, Haliastur indus
- White-bellied sea-eagle, Haliaeetus leucogaster
- Lesser fish-eagle, Haliaeetus humilis
- Gray-headed fish-eagle, Haliaeetus ichthyaetus

== Barn-owls ==
Order: Strigiformes Family: Tytonidae

Barn-owls are medium to large owls with large heads and characteristic heart-shaped faces. They have long strong legs with powerful talons. T

- Oriental bay-owl, Phodilus badius

== Owls ==
Order: Strigiformes Family: Strigidae

The typical owls are small to large solitary nocturnal birds of prey. They have large forward-facing eyes and ears, a hawk-like beak and a conspicuous circle of feathers around each eye called a facial disk.

- Reddish scops-owl, Otus rufescens
- Mountain scops-owl, Otus spilocephalus
- Collared scops-owl, Otus lettia
- Sunda scops-owl, Otus lempiji
- Barred eagle-owl, Bubo sumatranus
- Buffy fish-owl, Ketupa ketupu
- Sunda owlet, Taenioptynx sylvaticus
- Brown wood-owl, Strix leptogrammica
- Short-eared owl, Asio flammeus
- Brown boobook, Ninox scutulata

== Trogons ==
Order: Trogoniformes Family: Trogonidae

The family Trogonidae includes trogons and quetzals. Found in tropical woodlands worldwide, they feed on insects and fruit, and their broad bills and weak legs reflect their diet and arboreal habits. Although their flight is fast, they are reluctant to fly any distance. Trogons have soft, often colorful, feathers with distinctive male and female plumage.

- Red-naped trogon, Harpactes kasumba
- Diard's trogon, Harpactes diardii
- Cinnamon-rumped trogon, Harpactes orrhophaeus
- Scarlet-rumped trogon, Harpactes duvaucelii
- Orange-breasted trogon, Harpactes oreskios

== Hoopoes ==
Order: Bucerotiformes Family: Upupidae

Hoopoes have black, white and orangey-pink coloring with a large erectile crest on their head.

- Eurasian hoopoe, Upupa epops (A)

== Hornbills ==
Order: Bucerotiformes Family: Bucerotidae

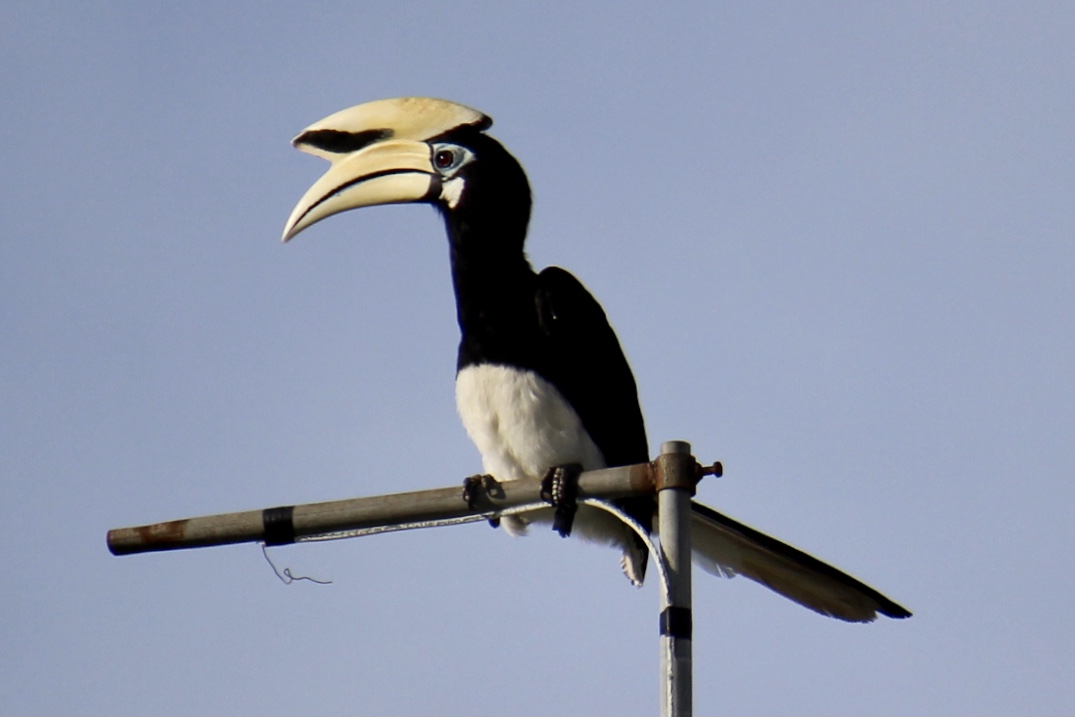
Oriental pied hornbill

Hornbills are a group of birds whose bill is shaped like a cow's horn, but without a twist, sometimes with a casque on the upper mandible. Frequently, the bill is brightly colored.

- White-crowned hornbill, Berenicornis comatus
- Helmeted hornbill, Buceros vigil
- Rhinoceros hornbill, Buceros rhinoceros
- Bushy-crested hornbill, Anorrhinus galeritus
- Black hornbill, Anthracoceros malayanus
- Oriental pied-hornbill, Anthracoceros albirostris
- Wreathed hornbill, Rhyticeros undulatus
- Wrinkled hornbill, Rhabdotorrhinus corrugatus

== Kingfishers ==
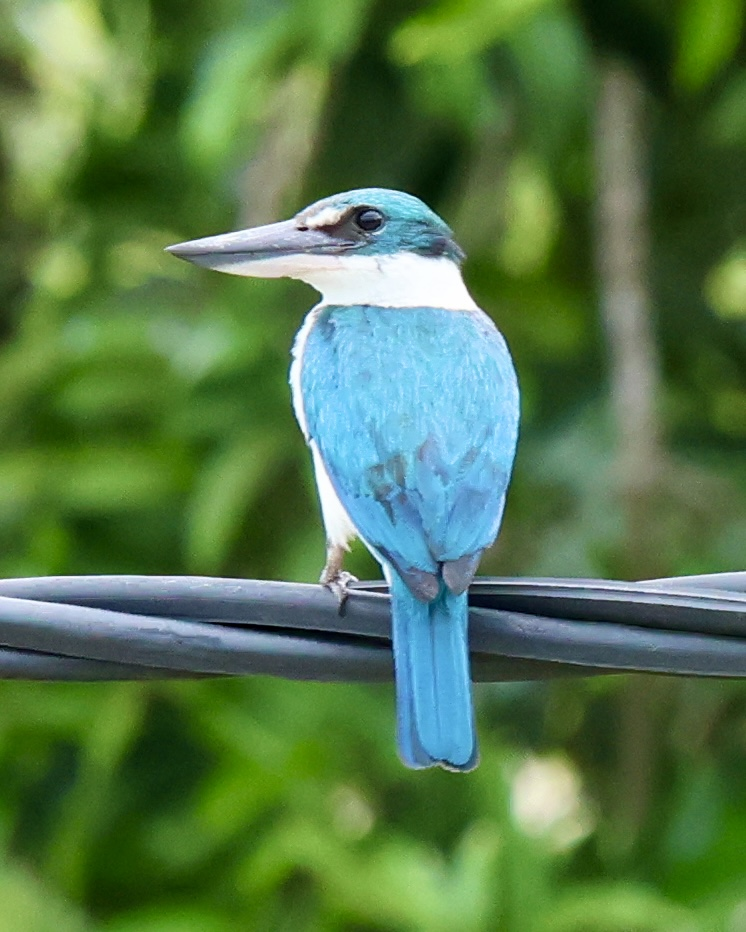
Collared kingfisher

Order: Coraciiformes Family: Alcedinidae Kingfishers are medium-sized birds with large heads, long, pointed bills, short legs and stubby tails.

- Common kingfisher, Alcedo atthis
- Blue-eared kingfisher, Alcedo meninting
- Malaysian blue-banded kingfisher, Alcedo peninsulae
- Black-backed kingfisher, Ceyx erithacus
- Rufous-backed dwarf-kingfisher, Ceyx rufidorsa
- Banded kingfisher, Lacedo pulchella
- Stork-billed kingfisher, Pelargopsis capensis
- Ruddy kingfisher, Halcyon coromanda
- Black-capped kingfisher, Halcyon pileata
- Sacred kingfisher, Todirhamphus sanctus
- Collared kingfisher, Todirhamphus chloris
- Rufous-collared kingfisher, Actenoides concretus

== Bee-eaters ==
Order: Coraciiformes Family: Meropidae

The bee-eaters are a group of near passerine birds in the family Meropidae. Most species are found in Africa but others occur in southern Europe, Madagascar, Australia and New Guinea. They are characterized by richly colored plumage, slender bodies, and usually elongated central tail feathers. All are colorful and have long downturned bills and pointed wings, which give them a swallow-like appearance when seen from afar.

- Red-bearded bee-eater, Nyctyornis amictus
- Blue-throated bee-eater, Merops viridis
- Blue-tailed bee-eater, Merops philippinus
- Rainbow bee-eater, Merops ornatus (A)

== Rollers ==
Order: Coraciiformes Family: Coraciidae

Rollers resemble crows in size and build, but are more closely related to the kingfishers and bee-eaters. They share the colorful appearance of those groups with blues and browns predominating. The two inner front toes are connected, but the outer toe is not.

- Dollarbird, Eurystomus orientalis

== Asian barbets ==
Order: Piciformes Family: Megalaimidae

The Asian barbets are plump birds, with short necks and large heads. They get their name from the bristles which fringe their heavy bills. Most species are brightly colored.

- Brown barbet, Caloramphus fuliginosus
- Blue-eared barbet, Psilopogon duvaucelii
- Red-crowned barbet, Psilopogon rafflesii
- Red-throated barbet, Psilopogon mystacophanos
- Yellow-crowned barbet, Psilopogon henricii
- Gold-whiskered barbet, Psilopogon chrysopogon

== Honeyguides ==
Order: Piciformes Family: Indicatoridae

Honeyguides are among the few birds that feed on wax. They are named for the greater honeyguide which leads traditional honey-hunters to bees' nests and, after the hunters have harvested the honey, feeds on the remaining contents of the hive.

- Malaysian honeyguide, Indicator archipelagicus

== Woodpeckers ==
Order: Piciformes Family: Picidae

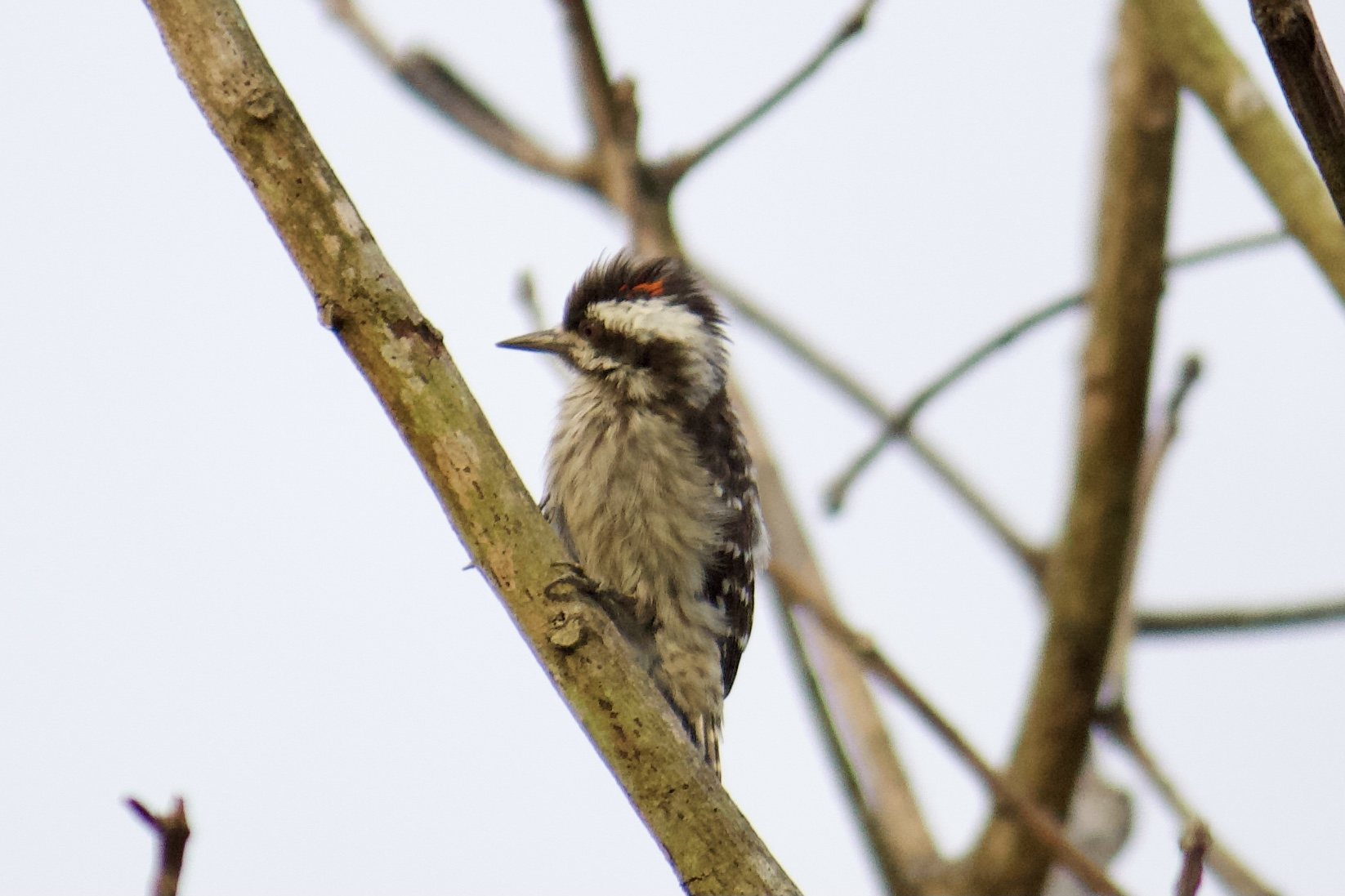
Brown-capped pygmy woodpecker

Woodpeckers are small to medium-sized birds with chisel-like beaks, short legs, stiff tails and long tongues used for capturing insects. Some species have feet with two toes pointing forward and two backward, while several species have only three toes. Many woodpeckers have the habit of tapping noisily on tree trunks with their beaks.

- Rufous piculet, Sasia abnormis
- Gray-and-buff woodpecker, Hemicircus concretus
- Sunda pygmy woodpecker, Yungipicus moluccensis
- Gray-capped pygmy woodpecker, Yungipicus canicapillus (A)
- Maroon woodpecker, Blythipicus rubiginosus
- Orange-backed woodpecker, Reinwardtipicus validus
- Rufous woodpecker, Micropternus brachyurus
- Buff-necked woodpecker, Meiglyptes tukki
- Buff-rumped woodpecker, Meiglyptes tristis
- Olive-backed woodpecker, Dinopium rafflesii
- Common flameback, Dinopium javanense
- Crimson-winged woodpecker, Picus puniceus
- Banded woodpecker, Chrysophlegma mineaceum
- Checker-throated woodpecker, Chrysophlegma mentale
- Great slaty woodpecker, Mulleripicus pulverulentus
- White-bellied woodpecker, Dryocopus javensis

== Falcons and caracaras ==
Order: Falconiformes Family: Falconidae

Falconidae is a family of diurnal birds of prey. They differ from hawks, eagles and kites in that they kill with their beaks instead of their talons. T

- Black-thighed falconet, Microhierax fringillarius
- Eurasian kestrel, Falco tinnunculus
- Oriental hobby, Falco severus
- Peregrine falcon, Falco peregrinus

== Old world parrots ==
Order: Psittaciformes Family: Psittaculidae

Characteristic features of parrots include a strong curved bill, an upright stance, strong legs, and clawed zygodactyl feet. Many parrots are vividly colored, and some are multi-colored. In size they range from 8 cm (3.1 in) to 1 m (3.3 ft) in length. Old World parrots are found from Africa east across south and southeast Asia and Oceania to Australia and New Zealand.

- Blue-rumped parrot, Psittinus cyanurus
- Long-tailed parakeet, Psittacula longicauda
- Blue-crowned hanging-parrot, Loriculus galgulus

== African and green broadbills ==
Order: Passeriformes Family: Calyptomenidae

The broadbills are small, brightly colored birds which feed on fruit and also take insects in flycatcher fashion, snapping their broad bills. Their habitat is canopies of wet forests.

- Green broadbill, Calyptomena viridis

== Asian and Grauer's broadbills ==
Order: Passeriformes Family: Eurylaimidae

The broadbills are small, brightly colored birds, which feed on fruit and also take insects in flycatcher fashion, snapping their broad bills. Their habitat is canopies of wet forests.

- Long-tailed broadbill, Psarisomus dalhousiae
- Dusky broadbill, Corydon sumatranus
- Black-and-red broadbill, Cymbirhynchus macrorhynchos
- Banded broadbill, Eurylaimus javanicus
- Black-and-yellow broadbill, Eurylaimus ochromalus

== Pittas ==
Order: Passeriformes Family: Pittidae

Pittas are medium-sized by passerine standards and are stocky, with fairly long, strong legs, short tails and stout bills. Many, but not all, are brightly colored. They spend the majority of their time on wet forest floors, eating snails, insects and similar invertebrates.

- Blue-banded pitta, Erythropitta arquata
- Garnet pitta, Erythropitta granatina
- Giant pitta, Hydrornis caerulea
- Bornean banded-pitta, Hydrornis schwaneri
- Blue-headed pitta, Hydrornis baudii
- Blue-winged pitta, Pitta moluccensis
- Fairy pitta, Pitta nympha
- Hooded pitta, Pitta sordida

== Thornbills and allies ==
Order: Passeriformes Family: Acanthizidae

Thornbills are small passerine birds, similar in habits to the tits.

- Golden-bellied gerygone, Gerygone sulphurea

== Cuckooshrikes ==
Order: Passeriformes Family: Campephagidae

The cuckooshrikes are small to medium-sized passerine birds. They are predominantly grayish with white and black, although some species are brightly colored.

- Fiery minivet, Pericrocotus igneus
- Gray-chinned minivet, Pericrocotus solaris
- Scarlet minivet, Pericrocotus flammeus
- Bar-bellied cuckooshrike, Coracina striata
- Pied triller, Lalage nigra
- Lesser cuckooshrike, Lalage fimbriata

== Vireos, shrike-babblers, and erpornis ==
Order: Passeriformes Family: Vireonidae

Most of the members of this family are found in the New World. However, the shrike-babblers and erpornis, which only slightly resemble the "true" vireos and greenlets, are found in South East Asia.

- White-browed shrike-babbler, Pteruthius flaviscapis
- White-bellied erpornis, Erpornis zantholeuca

== Whistlers and allies ==
Order: Passeriformes Family: Pachycephalidae

The family Pachycephalidae includes the whistlers, shrikethrushes, and some of the pitohuis.

- Bornean whistler, Pachycephala hypoxantha
- Mangrove whistler, Pachycephala cinerea

== Old World orioles ==
Order: Passeriformes Family: Oriolidae

The Old World orioles are colorful passerine birds. They are not related to the New World orioles.

- Dark-throated oriole, Oriolus xanthonotus
- Black-naped oriole, Oriolus chinensis
- Black-and-crimson oriole, Oriolus cruentus

== Woodswallows, bellmagpies, and allies ==
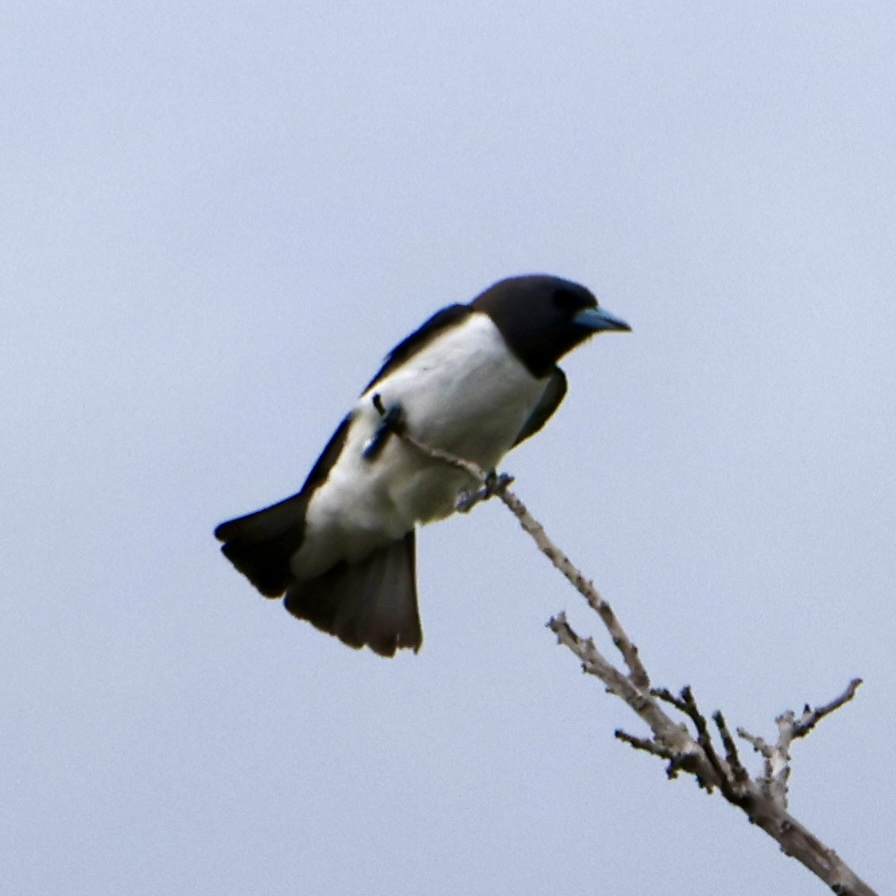
White-breasted woodswallow

Order: Passeriformes Family: Artamidae The woodswallows are soft-plumaged, somber-colored passerine birds. They are smooth, agile flyers with moderately large, semi-triangular wings.

- White-breasted woodswallow, Artamus leucorynchus

== Vangas, helmetshrikes, and allies ==
Order: Passeriformes Family: Vangidae

The family Vangidae is highly variable, though most members of it resemble true shrikes to some degree.

- Large woodshrike, Tephrodornis virgatus
- Bar-winged flycatcher-shrike, Hemipus picatus
- Black-winged flycatcher-shrike, Hemipus hirundinaceus
- Rufous-winged philentoma, Philentoma pyrhopterum
- Maroon-breasted philentoma, Philentoma velatum

== Bristlehead ==
Order: Passeriformes Family: Pityriasidae

The Bornean bristlehead is large black bird with a red and yellow head. Females also have some red in the wings. It has a massive heavy black hooked bill and a short tail. The crown of the head has short, colored projections like bare feather shaft, hence the name "bristlehead".

- Bornean bristlehead, Pityriasis gymnocephala

== Ioras ==
Order: Passeriformes Family: Aegithinidae

The ioras are bulbul-like birds of open forest or thorn scrub, but whereas that group tends to be drab in coloration, ioras are sexually dimorphic, with the males being brightly plumaged in yellows and greens.

- Common iora, Aegithina tiphia
- Green iora, Aegithina viridissima

== Fantails ==
Order: Passeriformes Family: Rhipiduridae

The fantails are small insectivorous birds which are specialist aerial feeders.

- Spotted fantail, Rhipidura perlata
- Malaysian pied-fantail, Rhipidura javanica
- White-throated fantail, Rhipidura albicollis

== Drongos ==
Order: Passeriformes Family: Dicruridae

The drongos are mostly black or dark gray in color, sometimes with metallic tints. They have long forked tails, and some Asian species have elaborate tail decorations. They have short legs and sit very upright while perched, like a shrike. They flycatch or take prey from the ground.

- Ashy drongo, Dicrurus leucophaeus
- Crow-billed drongo, Dicrurus annectens
- Bronzed drongo, Dicrurus aeneus
- Hair-crested drongo, Dicrurus hottentottus
- Greater racket-tailed drongo, Dicrurus paradiseus

== Monarch flycatchers ==
Order: Passeriformes Family: Monarchidae

The monarch flycatchers are small to medium-sized insectivorous passerines which hunt by flycatching.

- Black-naped monarch, Hypothymis azurea
- Blyth's paradise-flycatcher, Terpsiphone affinis

== Crested shrikejay ==
Order: Passeriformes Family: Platylophidae

Until 2018 this species was included in family Corvidae, but genetic and morphological evidence place it in its own family.

- Crested shrikejay, Platylophus galericulatus

== Shrikes ==
Order: Passeriformes Family: Laniidae

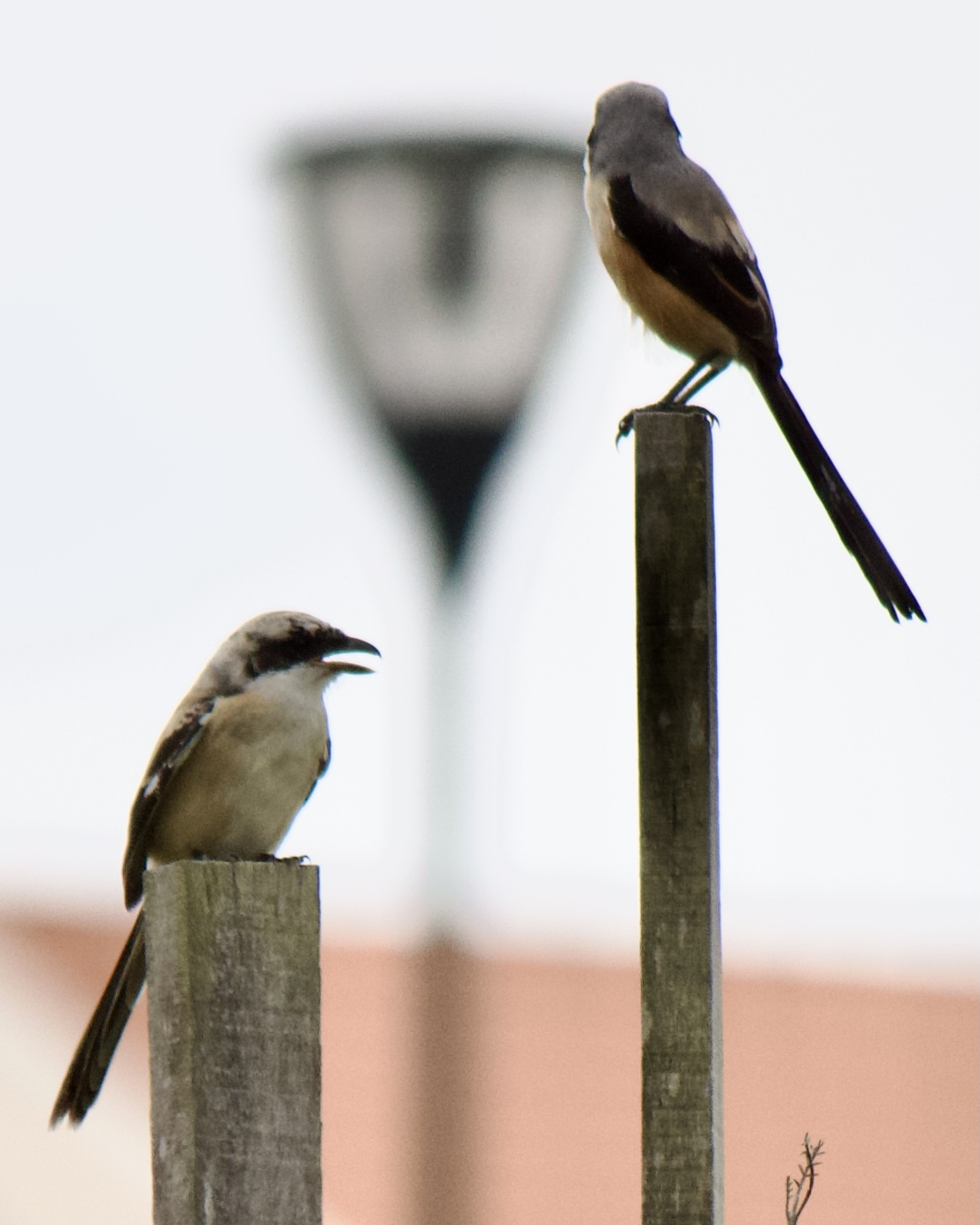
Brown shrike

Shrikes are passerine birds known for their habit of catching other birds and small animals and impaling the uneaten portions of their bodies on thorns. A typical shrike's beak is hooked, like a bird of prey.

- Tiger shrike, Lanius tigrinus
- Brown shrike, Lanius cristatus

== Crows, jays, and magpies ==
Order: Passeriformes Family: Corvidae

The family Corvidae includes crows, ravens, jays, choughs, magpies, treepies, nutcrackers and ground jays. Corvids are above average in size among the Passeriformes, and some of the larger species show high levels of intelligence.

- Black magpie, Platysmurus leucopterus
- Common green-magpie, Cissa chinensis
- Bornean green-magpie, Cissa jefferyi
- Slender-billed crow, Corvus enca

== Rail-babbler ==
Order: Passeriformes Family: Eupetidae

Eupetidae is a monotypic family; its sole species occurs in Brunei.

- Malaysian rail-babbler, Eupetes macrocerus

== Fairy flycatchers ==
Order: Passeriformes Family: Stenostiridae

Most of the species of this small family are found in Africa, though a few inhabit tropical Asia. They are not closely related to other birds called "flycatchers".

- Gray-headed canary-flycatcher, Culicicapa ceylonensis

== Tits, chickadees, and titmice ==
Order: Passeriformes Family: Paridae

The Paridae are mainly small stocky woodland species with short stout bills. Some have crests. They are adaptable birds, with a mixed diet including seeds and insects.

- Cinereous tit, Parus cinereus

== Cisticolas and allies ==
Order: Passeriformes Family: Cisticolidae

The Cisticolidae are warblers found mainly in warmer southern regions of the Old World. They are generally very small birds of drab brown or gray appearance found in open country such as grassland or scrub.

- Dark-necked tailorbird, Orthotomus atrogularis
- Ashy tailorbird, Orthotomus ruficeps
- Rufous-tailed tailorbird, Orthotomus sericeus
- Yellow-bellied prinia, Prinia flaviventris

== Reed warblers and allies ==
Order: Passeriformes Family: Acrocephalidae

The members of this family are usually rather large for "warblers". Most are rather plain olivaceous brown above with much yellow to beige below. They are usually found in open woodland, reedbeds, or tall grass. The family occurs mostly in southern to western Eurasia and surroundings, but it also ranges far into the Pacific, with some species in Africa.

- Oriental reed warbler, Acrocephalus orientalis
- Clamorous reed warbler, Acrocephalus stentoreus

== Grassbirds and allies ==
Order: Passeriformes Family: Locustellidae

Locustellidae are a family of small insectivorous songbirds found mainly in Eurasia, Africa, and the Australian region. They are smallish birds with tails that are usually long and pointed, and tend to be drab brownish or buffy all over.

- Pallas's grasshopper warbler, Helopsaltes certhiola
- Middendorff's grasshopper warbler, Helopsaltes ochotensis
- Lanceolated warbler, Locustella lanceolata
- Striated grassbird, Megalurus palustris

== Swallows ==
Order: Passeriformes Family: Hirundinidae

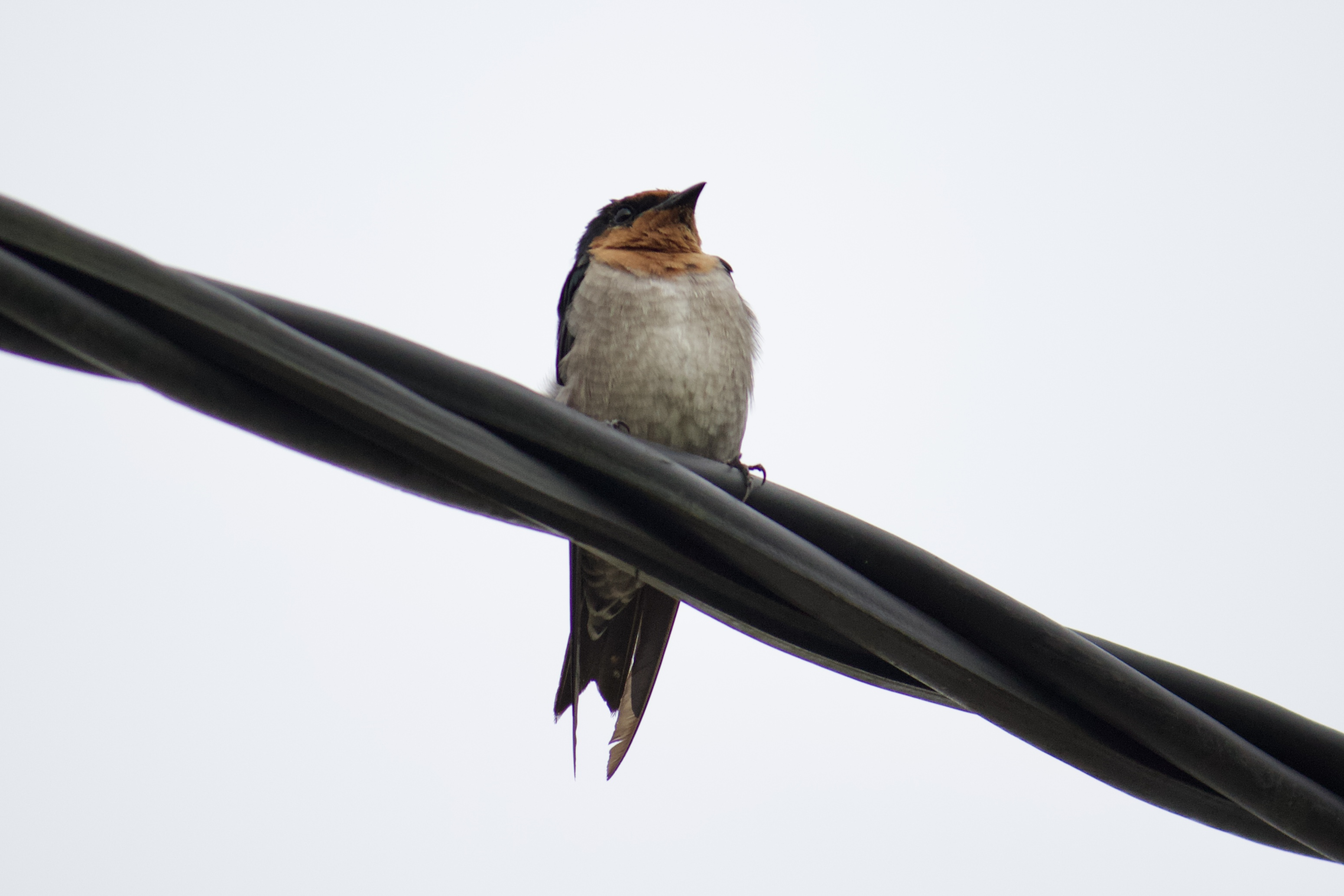
Pacific swallow

The family Hirundinidae is adapted to aerial feeding. They have a slender streamlined body, long pointed wings and a short bill with a wide gape. The feet are adapted to perching rather than walking, and the front toes are partially joined at the base.

- Bank swallow, Riparia riparia
- Barn swallow, Hirundo rustica
- Pacific swallow, Hirundo tahitica
- Red-rumped swallow, Cecropis daurica
- Striated swallow, Cecropis striolata

== Bulbuls ==
Order: Passeriformes Family: Pycnonotidae

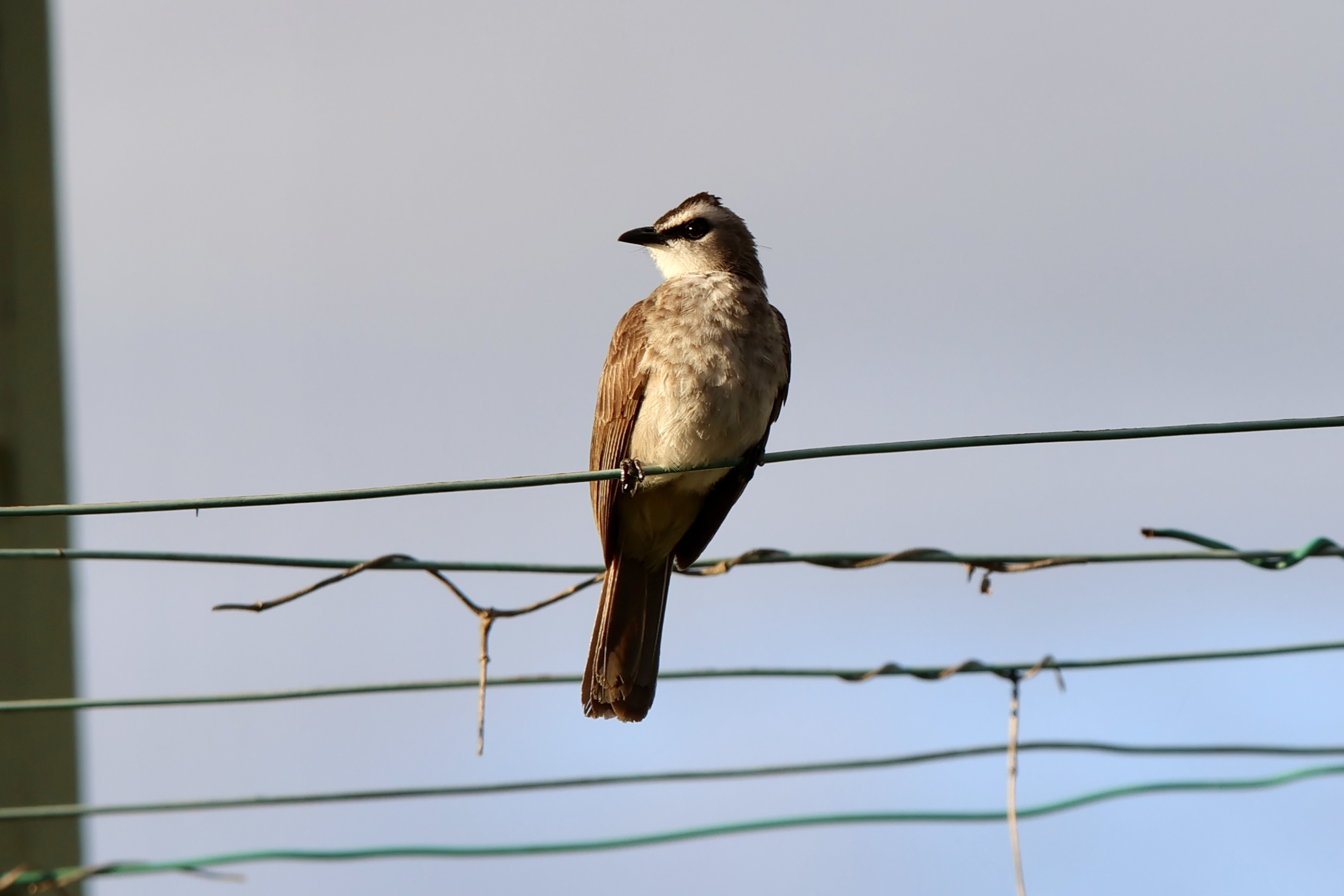
Yellow-vented bulbul

Bulbuls are medium-sized songbirds. Some are colorful with yellow, red or orange vents, cheeks, throats or supercilia, but most are drab, with uniform olive-brown to black plumage. Some species have distinct crests.

- Black-and-white bulbul, Brachypodius melanoleucus
- Puff-backed bulbul, Brachypodius eutilotus
- Black-headed bulbul, Brachypodius melanocephalos
- Spectacled bulbul, Rubigula erythropthalmos
- Gray-bellied bulbul, Rubigula cyaniventris
- Scaly-breasted bulbul, Rubigula squamatus
- Bornean bulbul, Rubigula montis
- Straw-headed bulbul, Pycnonotus zeylanicus
- Yellow-vented bulbul, Pycnonotus goiavier
- Olive-winged bulbul, Pycnonotus plumosus
- Cream-eyed bulbul, Pycnonotus pseudosimplex
- Cream-vented bulbul, Pycnonotus simplex
- Red-eyed bulbul, Pycnonotus brunneus
- Hairy-backed bulbul, Tricholestes criniger
- Hook-billed bulbul, Setornis criniger
- Finsch's bulbul, Alophoixus finschii
- Yellow-bellied bulbul, Alophoixus phaeocephalus
- Gray-cheeked bulbul, Alophoixus tephrogenys
- Penan bulbul, Alophoixus ruficrissus
- Charlotte's bulbul, Iole charlottae
- Streaked bulbul, Ixos malaccensis

== Leaf warblers ==
Order: Passeriformes Family: Phylloscopidae

Leaf warblers are a family of small insectivorous birds found mostly in Eurasia and ranging into Wallacea and Africa. The species are of various sizes, often green-plumaged above and yellow below, or more subdued with greyish-green to greyish-brown colors.

- Japanese leaf warbler, Phylloscopus xanthodryas
- Arctic warbler, Phylloscopus borealis
- Kamchatka leaf warbler, Phylloscopus examinandus
- Yellow-breasted warbler, Phylloscopus montis
- Mountain leaf warbler, Phylloscopus trivirgatus

== Bush warblers and allies ==
Order: Passeriformes Family: Scotocercidae

The members of this family are found throughout Africa, Asia, and Polynesia. Their taxonomy is in flux, and some authorities place some genera in other families.

- Yellow-bellied warbler, Abroscopus superciliaris
- Mountain tailorbird, Phyllergates cuculatus
- Aberrant bush warbler, Horornis flavolivaceus

== White-eyes, yuhinas, and allies ==
Order: Passeriformes Family: Zosteropidae

The white-eyes are small and mostly undistinguished, their plumage above being generally some dull color like greenish-olive, but some species have a white or bright yellow throat, breast or lower parts, and several have buff flanks. As their name suggests, many species have a white ring around each eye.

- Hume's white-eye, Zosterops auriventer

== Tree-babblers, scimitar-babblers, and allies ==
Order: Passeriformes Family: Timaliidae

The babblers, or timaliids, are somewhat diverse in size and coloration, but are characterized by soft fluffy plumage.

- Bold-striped tit-babbler, Mixornis bornensis
- Fluffy-backed tit-babbler, Macronus ptilosus
- Gray-hooded babbler, Cyanoderma bicolor
- Rufous-fronted babbler, Cyanoderma rufifrons
- Sunda scimitar-babbler, Pomatorhinus bornensis
- Black-throated babbler, Stachyris nigricollis
- Chestnut-rumped babbler, Stachyris maculata
- Gray-throated babbler, Stachyris nigriceps
- Gray-headed babbler, Stachyris poliocephala

== Ground babblers and allies ==
Order: Passeriformes Family: Pellorneidae

These small to medium-sized songbirds have soft fluffy plumage but are otherwise rather diverse. Members of the genus Illadopsis are found in forests, but some other genera are birds of scrublands.

- Sooty-capped babbler, Malacopteron affine
- Gray-breasted babbler, Malacopteron albogulare
- Scaly-crowned babbler, Malacopteron cinereum
- Rufous-crowned babbler, Malacopteron magnum
- Moustached babbler, Malacopteron magnirostre
- Black-capped babbler, Pellorneum capistratum
- Short-tailed babbler, Pellorneum malaccense
- Temminck's babbler, Pellorneum pyrrogenys
- White-chested babbler, Pellorneum rostratum
- Ferruginous babbler, Pellorneum bicolor
- Abbott's babbler, Malacocincla abbotti
- Horsfield's babbler, Malacocincla sepiaria
- Bornean wren-babbler, Ptilocichla leucogrammica

== Laughingthrushes and allies ==
Order: Passeriformes Family: Leiothrichidae

The members of this family are diverse in size and colouration, though those of genus Turdoides tend to be brown or greyish. The family is found in Africa, India, and southeast Asia.

- Brown fulvetta, Alcippe brunneicauda

== Nuthatches ==
Order: Passeriformes Family: Sittidae

Nuthatches are small woodland birds. They have the unusual ability to climb down trees head first, unlike other birds which can only go upwards. Nuthatches have big heads, short tails and powerful bills and feet.

- Velvet-fronted nuthatch, Sitta frontalis

== Starlings ==
Order: Passeriformes Family: Sturnidae

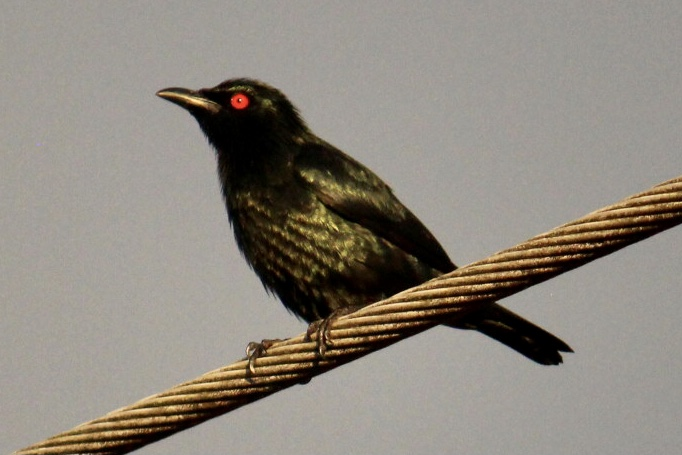
Asian glossy starling

Starlings are small to medium-sized passerine birds. Their flight is strong and direct and they are very gregarious. Their preferred habitat is fairly open country. They eat insects and fruit. Plumage is typically dark with a metallic sheen.

- Asian glossy starling, Aplonis panayensis
- Common hill myna, Gracula religiosa
- Chestnut-cheeked starling, Agropsar philippensis
- Black-collared starling, Gracupica nigricollis (I)
- Common myna, Acridotheres tristis (I)
- Javan myna, Acridotheres javanicus (I)
- Crested myna, Acridotheres cristatellus

== Thrushes and allies ==
Order: Passeriformes Family: Turdidae

The thrushes are a group of passerine birds that occur mainly in the Old World. They are plump, soft plumaged, small to medium-sized insectivores or sometimes omnivores, often feeding on the ground. Many have attractive songs.

- Fruit-hunter, Chlamydochaera jefferyi
- Chestnut-capped thrush, Geokichla interpres
- Orange-headed thrush, Geokichla citrina
- Eyebrowed thrush, Turdus obscurus
- Pale thrush, Turdus pallidus
- Island thrush, Turdus poliocephalus

== Old World flycatchers ==
Order: Passeriformes Family: Muscicapidae

Old World flycatchers are a large group of small passerine birds native to the Old World. They are mainly small arboreal insectivores. The appearance of these birds is highly varied, but they mostly have weak songs and harsh calls.

- Dark-sided flycatcher, Muscicapa sibirica
- Asian brown flycatcher, Muscicapa dauurica
- Oriental magpie-robin, Copsychus saularis
- Rufous-tailed shama, Copsychus pyrropygus
- White-crowned shama, Copsychus stricklandii
- Pale blue flycatcher, Cyornis unicolor
- Dayak blue flycatcher, Cyornis montanus
- Sunda blue flycatcher, Cyornis caerulatus
- Malaysian blue flycatcher, Cyornis turcosus
- Bornean blue flycatcher, Cyornis superbus
- Mangrove blue flycatcher, Cyornis rufigastra
- Brown-chested jungle-flycatcher, Cyornis brunneatus (A)
- Gray-chested jungle-flycatcher, Cyornis umbratilis
- Fulvous-chested jungle-flycatcher, Cyornis olivaceus
- Chestnut-tailed jungle-flycatcher, Cyornis ruficauda
- Blue-and-white flycatcher, Cyanoptila cyanomelana
- Verditer flycatcher, Eumyias thalassina
- Eyebrowed jungle-flycatcher, Vauriella gularis
- Bornean shortwing, Brachypteryx erythrogyna
- Bornean whistling-thrush, Myophonus borneensis
- Bornean forktail, Enicurus borneensis
- Siberian rubythroat, Calliope calliope
- Mugimaki flycatcher, Ficedula mugimaki
- Snowy-browed flycatcher, Ficedula hyperythra
- Taiga flycatcher, Ficedula albicilla
- Rufous-chested flycatcher, Ficedula dumetoria
- Blue rock-thrush, Monticola solitarius
- Siberian stonechat, Saxicola maurus
- Amur stonechat, Saxicola stejnegeri

== Flowerpeckers ==
Order: Passeriformes Family: Dicaeidae

The flowerpeckers are very small, stout, often brightly colored birds, with short tails, short thick curved bills and tubular tongues.

- Yellow-breasted flowerpecker, Prionochilus maculatus
- Crimson-breasted flowerpecker, Prionochilus percussus
- Yellow-rumped flowerpecker, Prionochilus xanthopygius
- Scarlet-breasted flowerpecker, Prionochilus thoracicus
- Spectacled flowerpecker, Dicaeum dayakorum (A)
- Brown-backed flowerpecker, Dicaeum everetti
- Yellow-vented flowerpecker, Dicaeum chrysorrheum
- Orange-bellied flowerpecker, Dicaeum trigonostigma
- Plain flowerpecker, Dicaeum minullum
- Scarlet-backed flowerpecker, Dicaeum cruentatum

== Sunbirds and spiderhunters ==
Order: Passeriformes Family: Nectariniidae

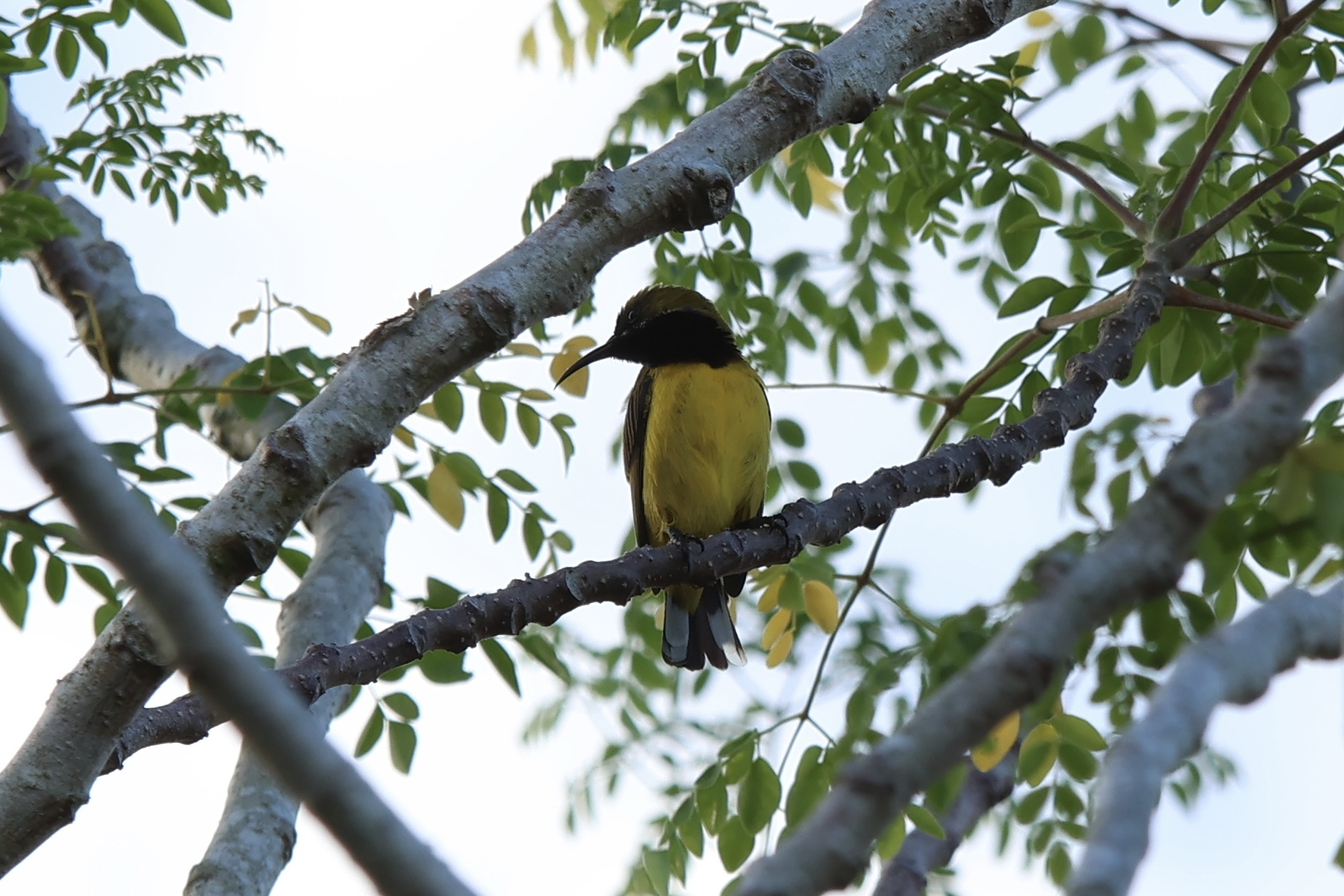
Olive-backed sunbird

The sunbirds and spiderhunters are very small passerine birds which feed largely on nectar, although they will also take insects, especially when feeding young. Flight is fast and direct on their short wings. Most species can take nectar by hovering like a hummingbird, but usually perch to feed.

- Ruby-cheeked sunbird, Chalcoparia singalensis
- Plain sunbird, Anthreptes simplex
- Brown-throated sunbird, Anthreptes malacensis
- Red-throated sunbird, Anthreptes rhodolaema
- Van Hasselt's sunbird, Leptocoma brasiliana
- Copper-throated sunbird, Leptocoma calcostetha
- Olive-backed sunbird, Cinnyris jugularis
- Temminck's sunbird, Aethopyga temminckii
- Crimson sunbird, Aethopyga siparaja
- Purple-naped sunbird, Hypogramma hypogrammicum
- Thick-billed spiderhunter, Arachnothera crassirostris
- Long-billed spiderhunter, Arachnothera robusta
- Little spiderhunter, Arachnothera longirostra
- Yellow-eared spiderhunter, Arachnothera chrysogenys
- Spectacled spiderhunter, Arachnothera flavigaster
- Gray-breasted spiderhunter, Arachnothera modesta
- Bornean spiderhunter, Arachnothera everetti

== Fairy-bluebirds ==
Order: Passeriformes Family: Irenidae

The fairy-bluebirds are bulbul-like birds of open forest or thorn scrub. The males are dark-blue and the females a duller green.

- Asian fairy-bluebird, Irena puella

== Leafbirds ==
Order: Passeriformes Family: Chloropseidae

The leafbirds are small, bulbul-like birds. The males are brightly plumaged, usually in greens and yellows.

- Greater green leafbird, Chloropsis sonnerati
- Lesser green leafbird, Chloropsis cyanopogon
- Blue-winged leafbird, Chloropsis cochinchinensis
- Bornean leafbird, Chloropsis kinabaluensis

== Waxbills and allies ==
Order: Passeriformes Family: Estrildidae

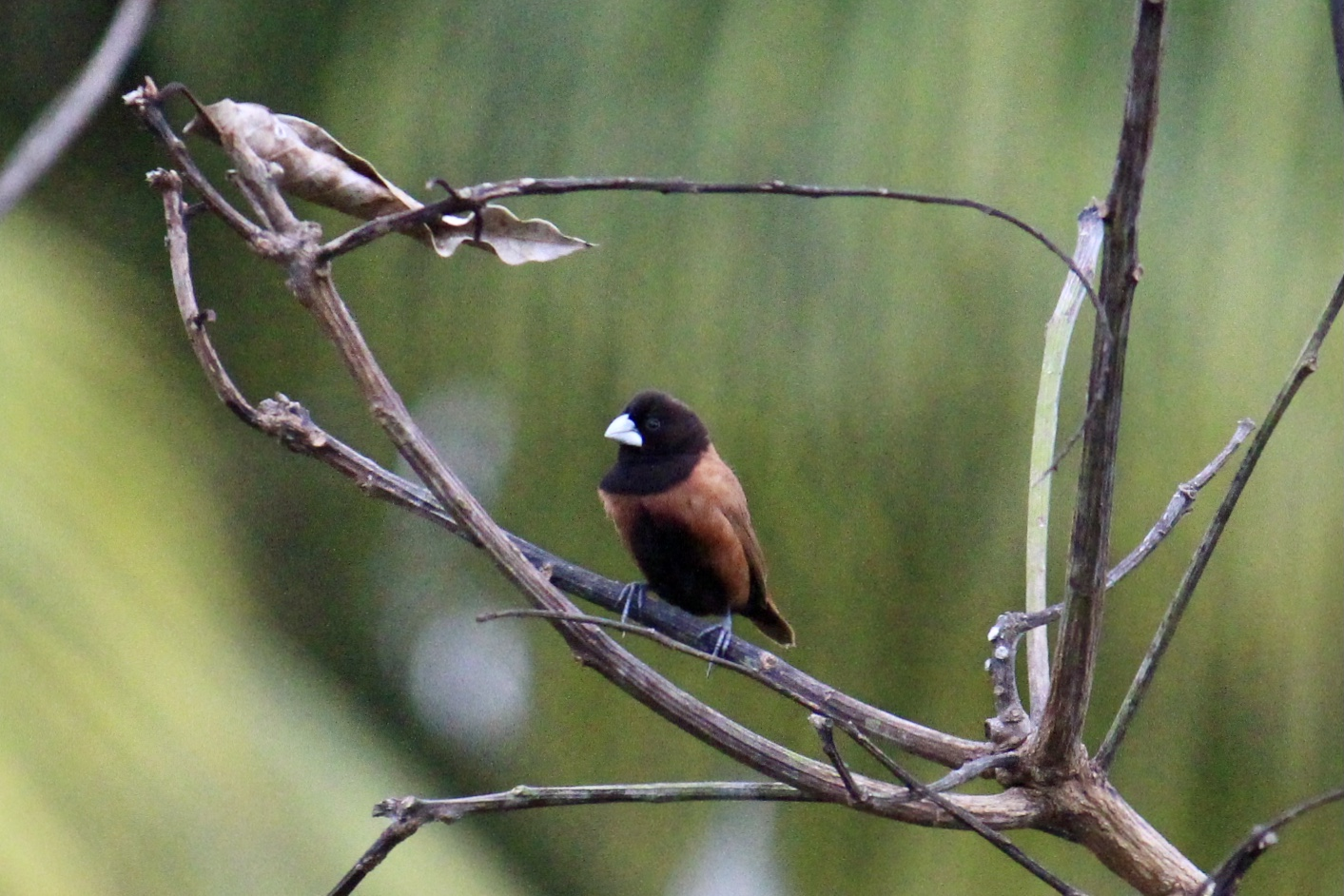
Chestnut munia

The estrildid finches are small passerine birds of the Old World tropics and Australasia. They are gregarious and often colonial seed eaters with short thick but pointed bills. They are all similar in structure and habits, but have a wide variation in plumage colors and patterns.

- Java sparrow, Padda oryzivora (I)
- Scaly-breasted munia, Lonchura punctulata
- Dusky munia, Lonchura fuscans
- White-bellied munia, Lonchura leucogastra
- Chestnut munia, Lonchura atricapilla
- Pin-tailed parrotfinch, Erythrura prasina
- Tawny-breasted parrotfinch, Erythrura hyperythra

== Old World sparrows ==
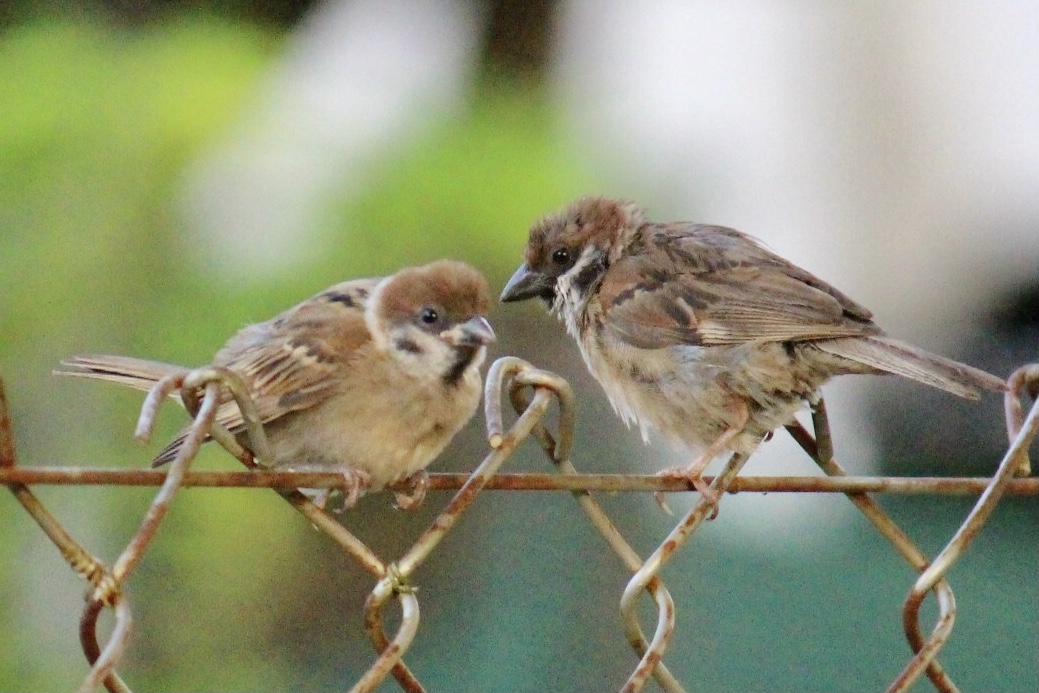
Eurasian tree sparrow

Order: Passeriformes Family: Passeridae

Old World sparrows are small passerine birds. In general, sparrows tend to be small, plump, brown or gray birds with short tails and short powerful beaks. Sparrows are seed eaters, but they also consume small insects.

- Eurasian tree sparrow, Passer montanus

== Wagtails and pipits ==
Order: Passeriformes Family: Motacillidae

Motacillidae is a family of small passerine birds with medium to long tails. They include the wagtails, longclaws and pipits. They are slender, ground feeding insectivores of open country.

- Gray wagtail, Motacilla cinerea
- Western yellow wagtail, Motacilla flava
- Eastern yellow wagtail, Motacilla tschutschensis
- White wagtail, Motacilla alba
- Paddyfield pipit, Anthus rufulus
- Olive-backed pipit, Anthus hodgsoni
- Pechora pipit, Anthus gustavi
- Red-throated pipit, Anthus cervinus

== Old World buntings ==
Order: Passeriformes Family: Emberizidae

The emberizids are a large family of passerine birds. They are seed-eating birds with distinctively shaped bills. Many emberizid species have distinctive head patterns.

- Black-headed bunting, Emberiza melanocephala (A)
- Yellow-breasted bunting, Emberiza aureola

== See also ==
- List of birds
- Lists of birds by region
