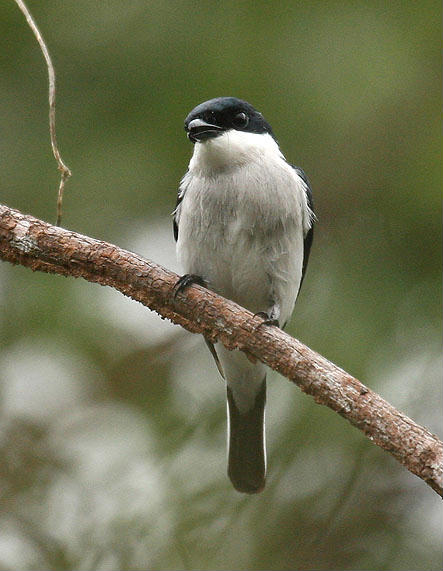
- Black-winged flycatcher-shrike (H. hirundinaceus)

Scientific classification
- Kingdom: Animalia
- Phylum: Chordata
- Class: Aves
- Order: Passeriformes
- Family: Vangidae
- Genus: Hemipus; Hodgson, 1844

Type species
- Hemipus picaecolor Hodgson, 1844

Species
- H. hirundinaceus; H. picatus

= Flycatcher-shrike =

Genus of birds

The flycatcher-shrikes are two species of small Asian passerine bird belonging to the genus Hemipus. They are now usually placed in the Vangidae.

== Description ==
They are 12.5 to 14.5 cm (4.9 to 5.7 in) in length. They are slender birds with fairly long wings and tails. The bill and feet are black. The plumage is dark above and pale below with white on the rump. The bar-winged flycatcher-shrike has a large white patch on the wing which the black-winged flycatcher-shrike lacks.

== Distribution and range ==
They are found in broad-leaved forest, forest edge and secondary forest in southern Asia. Both species have large ranges and are not considered to be threatened. The bar-winged flycatcher-shrike occurs in the Indian subcontinent, south-west China, mainland South-east Asia and on the islands of Sumatra and Borneo. The black-winged flycatcher-shrike is found in the Malay Peninsula and on Sumatra, Borneo, Java and Bali.

== Behaviour ==
They forage actively in the forest canopy for insects. They are often found in groups and frequently join mixed-species foraging flocks. They will also catch insects in flight.

The nest is cup-shaped and built on a tree branch. Two or three eggs are laid; they are greenish or pinkish with darker markings. Both parents are involved in building the nest, incubating the eggs and rearing the young.

== Species list ==
Image	Scientific name	Common name	Distribution
	Hemipus hirundinaceus	Black-winged flycatcher-shrike	Malay Peninsula to Sumatra, Borneo, Java and Bali.
	Hemipus picatus	Bar-winged flycatcher-shrike	Indomalaya

== See also ==
The two shrike-flycatcher species of Africa are also occasionally known as flycatcher-shrikes:

- Crested flycatcher-shrike: see black-and-white shrike-flycatcher (Bias musicus)
- Red-eyed flycatcher-shrike: see African shrike-flycatcher (Megabyas flammulatus)
