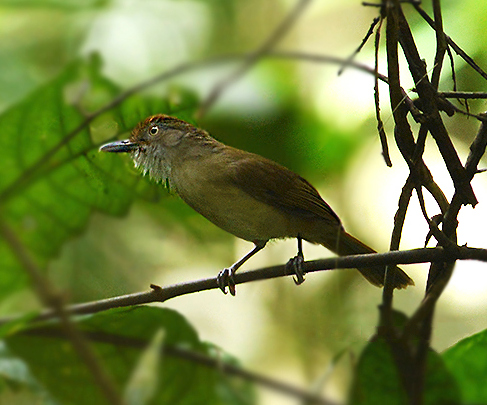
- Melodious babbler (Malacopteron palawanense)

Scientific classification
- Kingdom: Animalia
- Phylum: Chordata
- Class: Aves
- Order: Passeriformes
- Family: Pellorneidae
- Genus: Malacopteron; Eyton, 1839

Type species
- Malacopteron magnum Eyton, 1839

= Malacopteron =

Genus of birds

Malacopteron is a genus of passerine birds in the family Pellorneidae.

== Species ==
The genus contains the following species:

Image	Common name	Scientific name	Distribution
	Moustached babbler	Malacopteron magnirostre	Peninsular Malaysia and Sumatra
	Sooty-capped babbler	Malacopteron affine	Malaysia, Indonesia, Brunei, Thailand, and Singapore.
	Scaly-crowned babbler	Malacopteron cinereum	Brunei, Cambodia, Indonesia, Laos, Malaysia, Thailand, and Vietnam.
	Rufous-crowned babbler	Malacopteron magnum	Brunei, Indonesia, Malaysia, Myanmar, the Philippines, and Thailand.
	Melodious babbler	Malacopteron palawanense	Philippines.
	Grey-breasted babbler	Malacopteron albogulare	Brunei, Indonesia and Malaysia.
