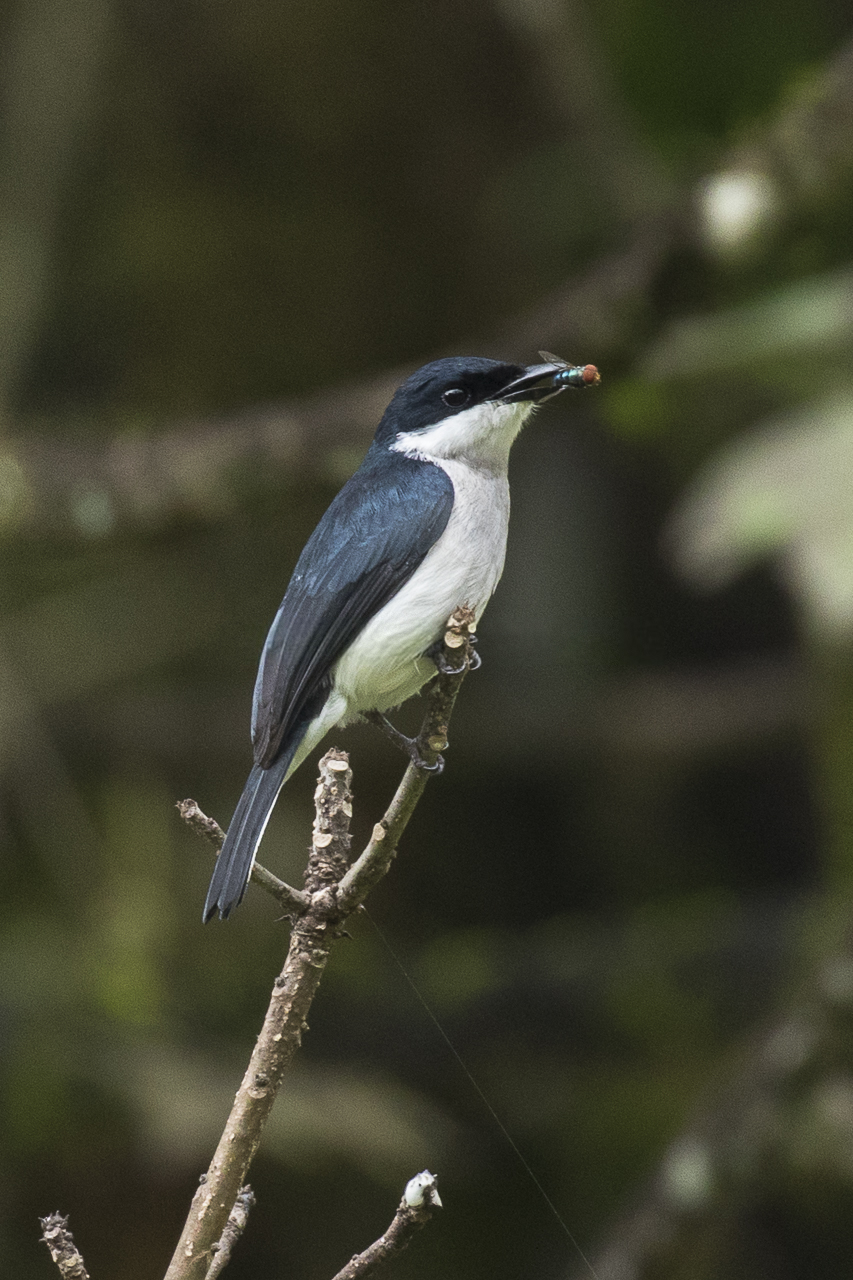

Conservation status
- Least Concern (IUCN 3.1)

Scientific classification
- Kingdom: Animalia
- Phylum: Chordata
- Class: Aves
- Order: Passeriformes
- Family: Vangidae
- Genus: Hemipus
- Species: H. hirundinaceus

Binomial name
- Hemipus hirundinaceus (Temminck, 1822)

Synonyms
- Hemipus obscurus Muscicapa hirundinacea

= Black-winged flycatcher-shrike =

Species of bird

The black-winged flycatcher-shrike (Hemipus hirundinaceus) is a species of bird in the flycatcher-shrike genus, Hemipus. It is usually placed in the Vangidae. It is found in the Malay Peninsula and the Greater Sunda Islands. Its natural habitats are lowland forests and sometimes swamps and mangroves. The International Union for Conservation of Nature (IUCN) has assessed it as being of least concern.

== Taxonomy ==
Thomas Horsfield described this species as Muscicapa obscura in 1821, and it was later transferred to the genus Hemipus, as Hemipus obscurus. Because Muscicapa obscura was an unavailable name, the name Muscicapa hirundinacea published by Coenraad Jacob Temminck in 1822 was used, making the name Hemipus hirundinaceus. The IOC World Bird List transferred the genus Hemipus from Campephagidae, the cuckooshrikes, to Tephrodornithidae, the woodshrikes, because it was found to be closely related to Tephrodornis in 2006. The Handbook of the Birds of the World places both genera in Vangidae.

== Description ==
The black-winged flycatcher-shrike is about 15 cm (5.9 in) long. The male's head and upperparts are black, having a green sheen. The rump has black and white bars, and the tail is black. The chin and upper throat are white, the lower throat and breast are gull grey, and the belly is white. The leg feathers are dark grey. The eyes are dark brown, and the beak and feet are black. The female's upperparts are sooty brown instead of black. The juvenile bird has a brownish black beak and sooty brown upperparts with buff fringes.

== Distribution and habitat ==
This species ranges from the Malay Peninsula to Sumatra, Borneo, Java and Bali. A record from southern Tenasserim is not supported by evidence. It is found below 800 m (2,600 ft) in elevation and is more common below 300 m (980 ft); this is usually lower than the bar-winged flycatcher-shrike (Hemipus picatus). The black-winged flycatcher-shrike lives in the canopy of lowland forests and forest edges and along forest roads and streams, and it sometimes occurs in swamps, mangroves and secondary forest.

== Behaviour ==
This flycatcher-shrike catches insects from the underside of leaves and in the air, often perching at an exposed location. It is most often found in pairs and also occurs singly, in small parties and in mixed-species foraging flocks. Its calls include a wirrawik and a sharp chisi-wik, and its song is a high-pitched twee wi-wi-wi-wi. Breeding has been inferred to occur from February to July. The cone-shaped nest is attached to a branch using cobweb. The male collects pieces of bark, lichen, fibres and cobweb, and the female shapes the nest by pressing its body against it. The bark camouflages the nest, making it hard to spot. The eggs are white, with dark brown spots. Moulting occurs from May to at least August. The primaries are replaced starting outwards from the innermost feathers.

== Status ==
The population is declining because of habitat loss, but not rapidly enough to make it vulnerable, so the IUCN has assessed it to be a least-concern species.
