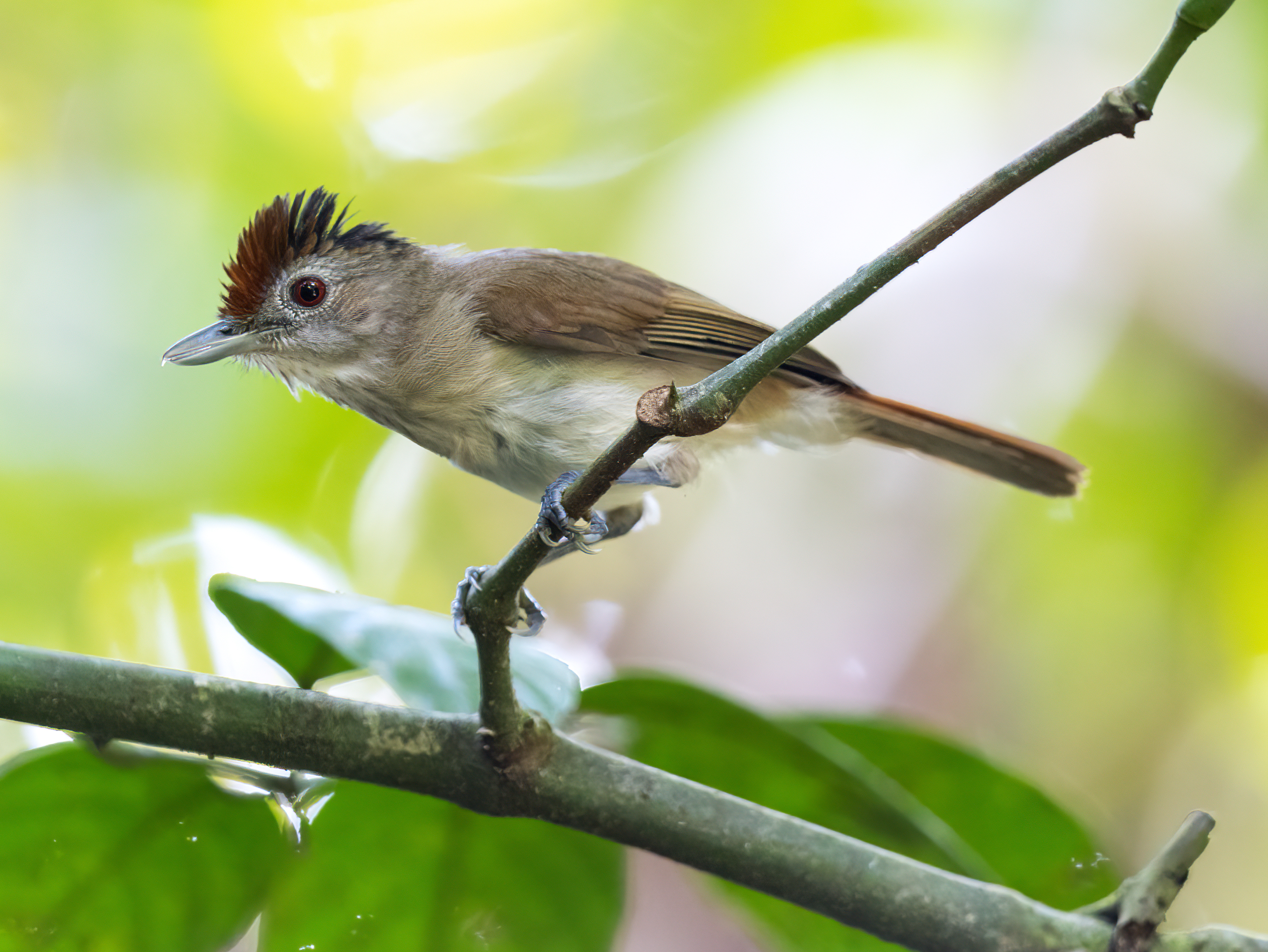

Conservation status
- Near Threatened (IUCN 3.1)

Scientific classification
- Kingdom: Animalia
- Phylum: Chordata
- Class: Aves
- Order: Passeriformes
- Family: Pellorneidae
- Genus: Malacopteron
- Species: M. magnum

Binomial name
- Malacopteron magnum Eyton, 1839

= Rufous-crowned babbler =

Species of bird

The rufous-crowned babbler (Malacopteron magnum) is a species of bird in the family Pellorneidae. It is found in Brunei, Indonesia, Malaysia, Myanmar, the Philippines, and Thailand. Its natural habitat is subtropical or tropical moist lowland forest. It is threatened by habitat loss.
