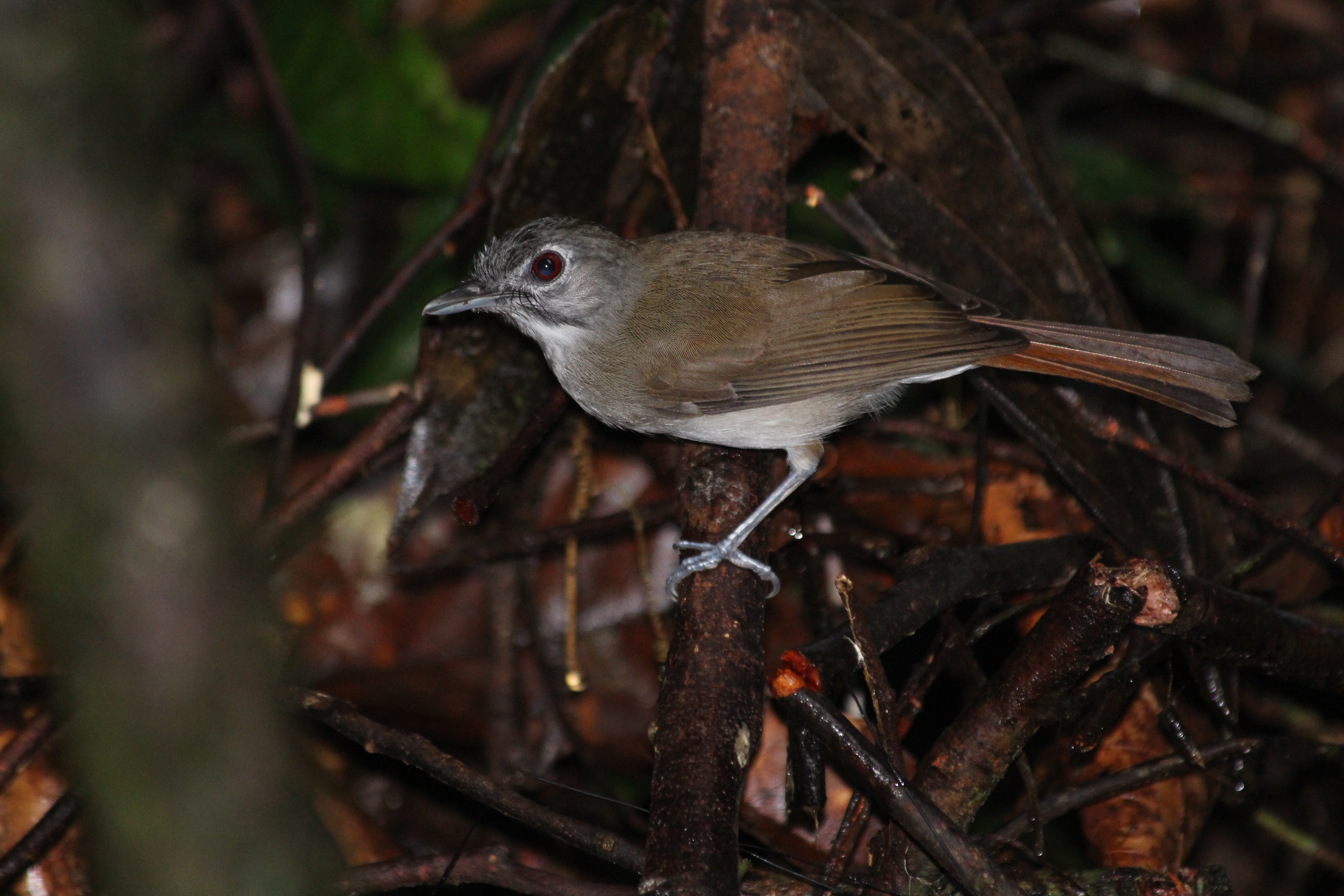
- M. m. cinereocapilla

Conservation status
- Least Concern (IUCN 3.1)

Scientific classification
- Kingdom: Animalia
- Phylum: Chordata
- Class: Aves
- Order: Passeriformes
- Family: Pellorneidae
- Genus: Malacopteron
- Species: M. magnirostre

Binomial name
- Malacopteron magnirostre (Moore, F, 1854)

= Moustached babbler =

Species of bird

The moustached babbler (Malacopteron magnirostre) is a species of bird in the ground babbler family Pellorneidae. The species is also known as the brown-headed babbler or brown-headed tree-babbler.

== Taxonomy and systematics ==
This species has two subspecies, the nominate race M. m. magnirostre and the subspecies M. m. cinereocapilla (Salvadori, 1868). A third subspecies, flavum, from the Anamba Islands, is sometimes recognised but is usually merged into the nominate race. The specific name magnirostre comes from the Latin magnus for big and rostris for billed. The name for the subspecies cinereocapilla comes from the Latin cinereus for ash/ashy and capillus for headed.

== Distribution and habitat ==
The moustached babbler is found in Sundaland. The nominate race is found in southern Myanmar and Thailand through Peninsular Malaysia and Sumatra, and the subspecies M. m. cinereocapilla is endemic to Borneo. Formerly, it could be found in the forests of Singapore, but it is now likely extinct there.

Its natural habitat is tropical moist primary lowland forests, peatswamp forest, secondary forest, logged forests and old rubber plantations, from 915 m (3,002 ft), rarely to 1,200 m (3,900 ft). It is suggested that this species, since it prefers logged forest to primary forest, could be used as a habitat indicator.

== Description ==
The moustached babbler is 18 cm (7.1 in) long and weighs between 16–25 g (0.56–0.88 oz). The plumage is dull brown above and whitish below. The crown is olive-brown in the nominate race, with a grey loral stripe and moustachial stripe.

== Behaviour ==
The moustached babbler feeds on insects, including on beetles and locusts. They feed in mid-story, from 4–6 m (13–20 ft) off the ground.
