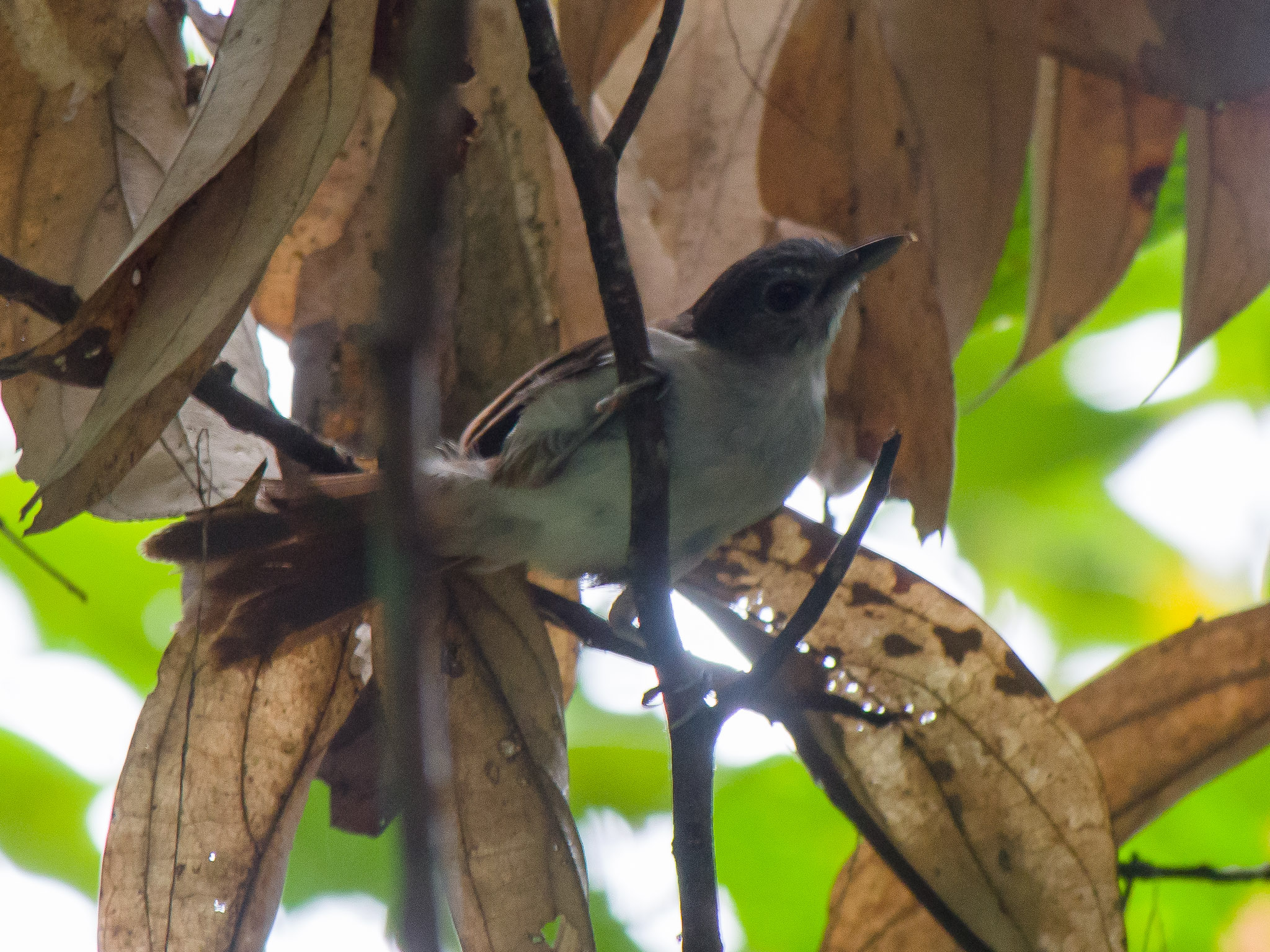

Conservation status
- Near Threatened (IUCN 3.1)

Scientific classification
- Kingdom: Animalia
- Phylum: Chordata
- Class: Aves
- Order: Passeriformes
- Family: Pellorneidae
- Genus: Malacopteron
- Species: M. affine

Binomial name
- Malacopteron affine (Blyth, 1842)

= Sooty-capped babbler =

Species of bird

The sooty-capped babbler (Malacopteron affine) is a member of the family Pellorneidae. It occurs in Malaysia, Indonesia, Brunei, Thailand, and Singapore.

The sooty-capped babbler is also known in Malay as rimba tinjau belukar. Its main diet is small insects.

It is threatened by habitat loss.

There are two subspecies:

- M. a. affine (Blyth, 1842) – Malay Peninsula, Sumatra, Banyak Islands, Bangka Islands
- M. a. phoeniceum Deignan, 1950 – Borneo
