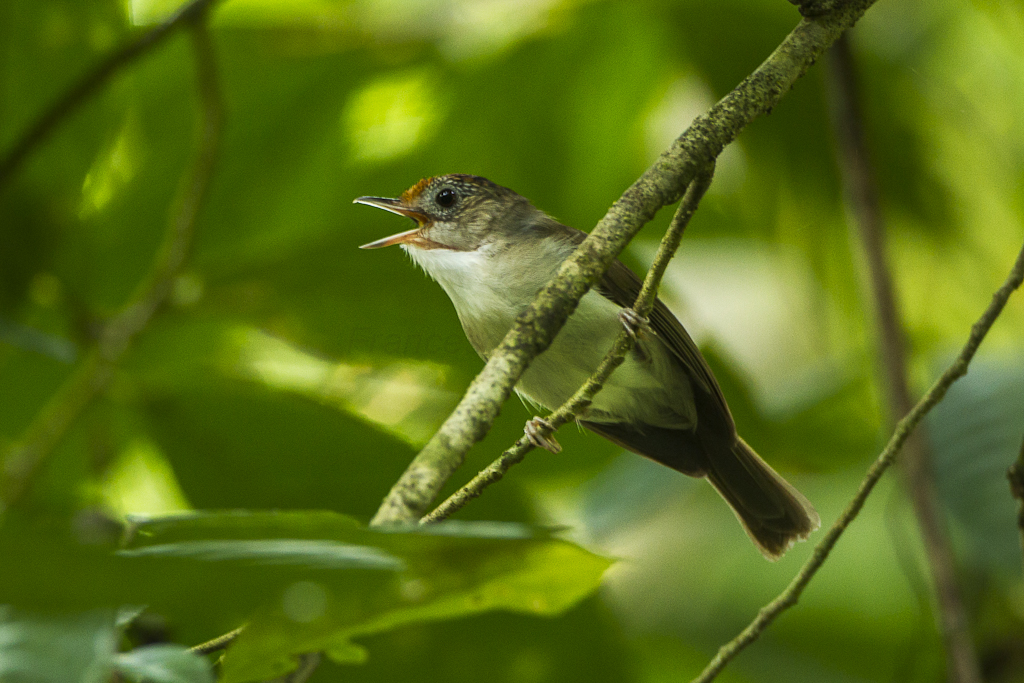

Conservation status
- Least Concern (IUCN 3.1)

Scientific classification
- Kingdom: Animalia
- Phylum: Chordata
- Class: Aves
- Order: Passeriformes
- Family: Pellorneidae
- Genus: Malacopteron
- Species: M. cinereum

Binomial name
- Malacopteron cinereum Eyton, 1839

= Scaly-crowned babbler =

Species of bird

The scaly-crowned babbler (Malacopteron cinereum) is a species of bird in the family Pellorneidae. It is found in Brunei, Cambodia, Indonesia, Laos, Malaysia, Thailand, and Vietnam. Its natural habitat is subtropical or tropical moist lowland forest.
