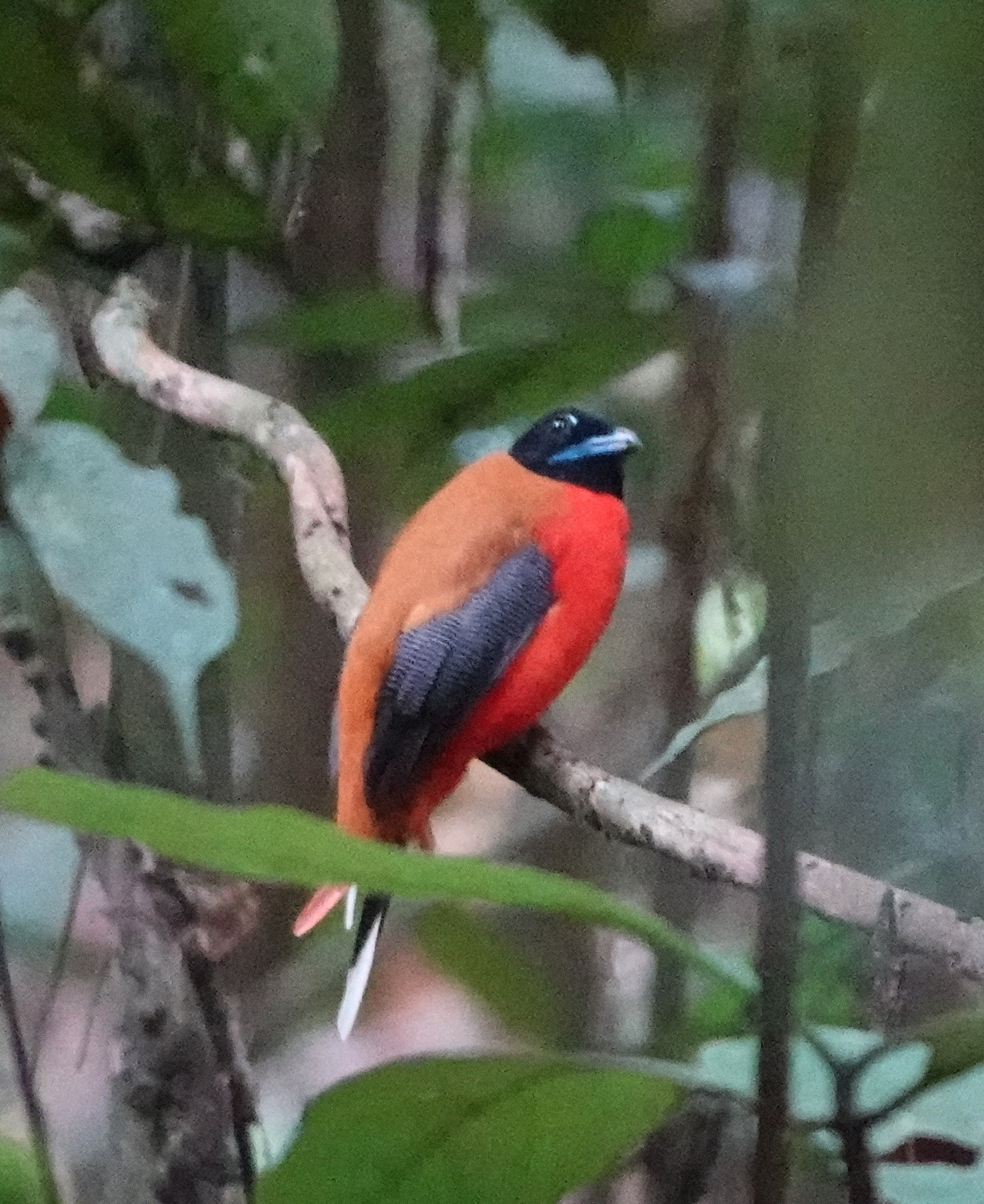

Conservation status
- Vulnerable (IUCN 3.1)

Scientific classification
- Kingdom: Animalia
- Phylum: Chordata
- Class: Aves
- Order: Trogoniformes
- Family: Trogonidae
- Genus: Harpactes
- Species: H. orrhophaeus

Binomial name
- Harpactes orrhophaeus (Cabanis & Heine, 1863)

= Cinnamon-rumped trogon =

Species of bird

The cinnamon-rumped trogon (Harpactes orrhophaeus) is a species of bird in the family Trogonidae, known for their colorful plumage.

== Taxonomy ==
The cinnamon-rumped trogon is a part of the family Trogonidae, which is monotypic within their order, Trogoniformes.

== Description ==
The cinnamon-rumped trogon is a close relative of the scarlet-rumped trogon, which also resides in the Malay peninsula and Indonesia. These two birds have similar appearances, but the cinnamon trogon is slightly larger, and the birds can be distinguished by the eponymous coloration of the plumage on their backs and tails.

This species contains two subspecies, the nominal H. o. orrhophaeus of Thailand and Malaysia, and H. o. vidua of Indonesia. Both subspecies exhibit distinct sexual dimorphism.

The nominal subspecies (H. o. orrhophaeus) ranges from 45 – 61g and it is about 25 cm in length. Males of the subspecies have a black hood, distinct blue bill, and a narrow head. Their backs and tail plumage are a pale brown (cinnamon), and the plumage under the tail is white, bordered by black. Males have pink underbellies, which can be used to differentiate them from females, along with the female's dark brown hood. Juvenile birds resemble females of the species. H. o. vidua appears quite similar, though females of the subspecies tend to exhibit darker coloration in their plumage.

== Habitat and distribution ==
The cinnamon-rumped trogon is found in Southeast Asia, specifically in Peninsular Malaysia, Thailand and Borneo. The species requires undisturbed forest habitat, though across its range, it may be found at highly variable elevations, from sea level on the Thai-Malay peninsula up to 1,500 meters on Borneo. Its habitat preference appears to be moist, tropical lowlands, though it also resides in piedmont areas of Borneo and Sumatra.

The cinnamon-rumped trogon is non-migratory.

== Behaviour ==
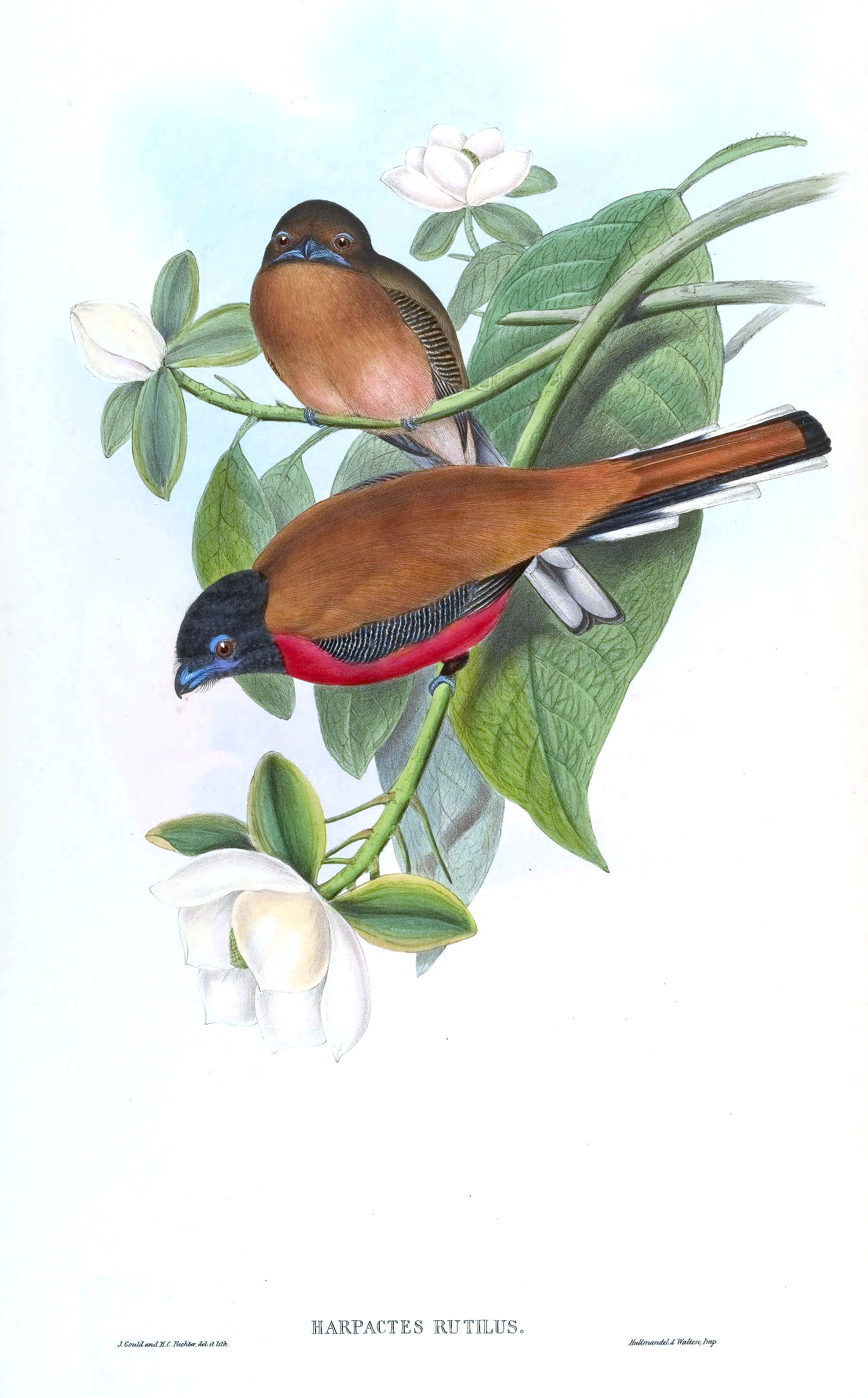
Illustration

=== Vocalization ===
The cinnamon-rumped trogon has a short, sharp cry that is normally repeated 4–5 times during a call. This repeated cry is phonetically approximated as "ta-y-aup-ta-y-aup". There is normally a pause of about 10–15 seconds between these calls. They additionally have a second "purring" call. These different vocalizations may be used in different scenarios, though this has not been confirmed.

=== Diet ===
Cinnamon-rumped trogons have a diet that consists mostly of insects. They mostly enjoy cicadas and many phasmids, and will also sometimes eat stick and leaf insects. This species typically hunts alone, but has also been noted to sometimes forage in smaller groups.

=== Reproduction ===
The cinnamon-rumped trogon breeds during the months of March, April and June in Malaysia, although in Borneo this mainly occurs during the month of March. This species of trogon will normally have its nests in the lower parts of rotten trees at about 1–1.5 m high. Here they will create their own holes/cavities to be used as a nesting site. They will normally produce 2 eggs per nesting attempt, these would then be incubated by the parents.

== Status and conservation ==
The cinnamon-rumped trogon is currently threatened by rapid deforestation across its range for oil palm plantations. Its population is believed to be decreasing quickly, and is thus categorized as Vulnerable by the IUCN. In Thailand, their habitats are being threatened and they only have 3 protected regions in which to survive. In Malaysia, the cinnamon-rumped trogon has begun to appear more often in its normal environment. Seeing as these environments are becoming more of a rarity it is assumed that habitat loss will also threaten those found in Malaysia.
