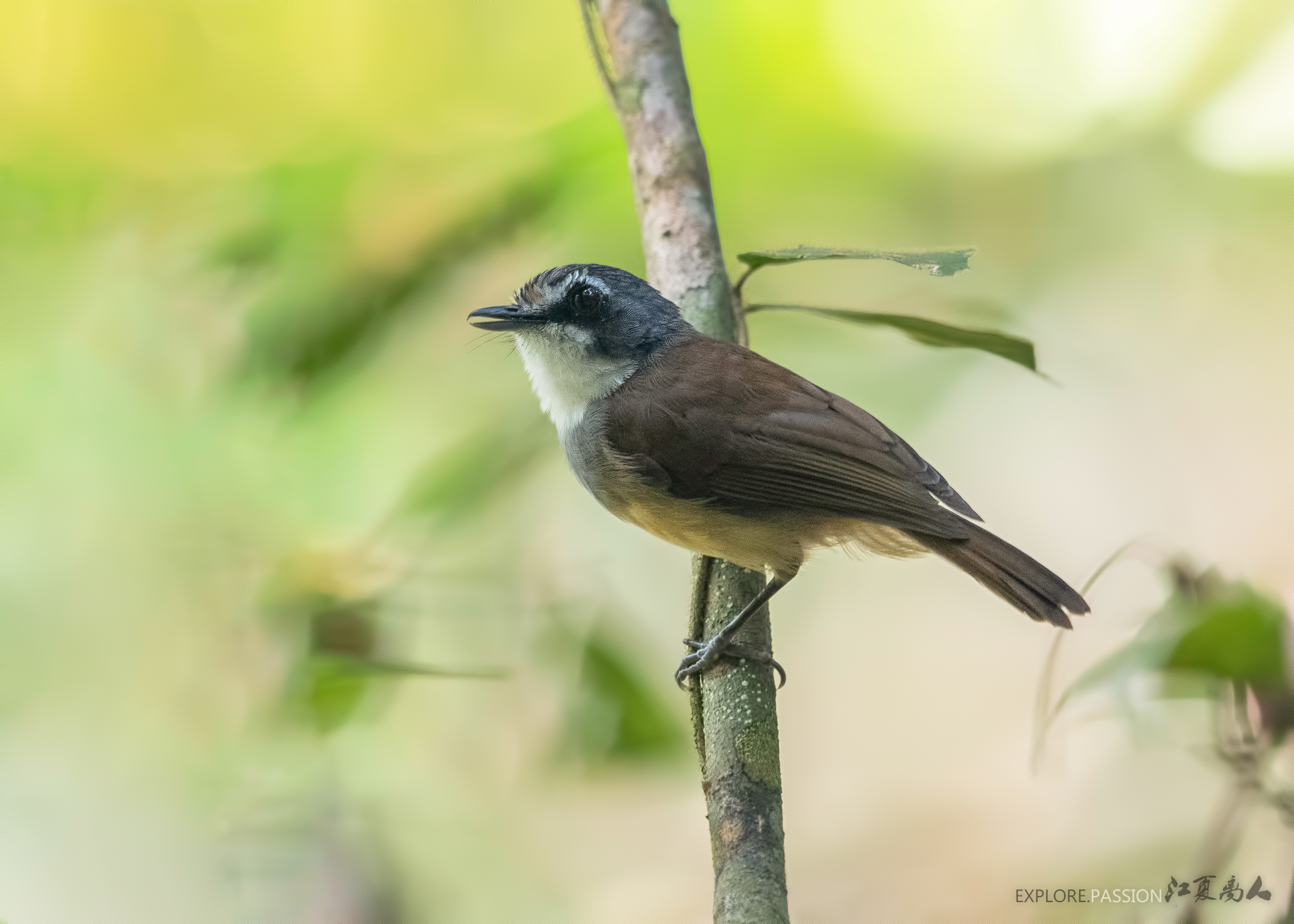

Conservation status
- Near Threatened (IUCN 3.1)

Scientific classification
- Kingdom: Animalia
- Phylum: Chordata
- Class: Aves
- Order: Passeriformes
- Family: Pellorneidae
- Genus: Malacopteron
- Species: M. albogulare

Binomial name
- Malacopteron albogulare (Blyth, 1844)

= Grey-breasted babbler =

Species of bird

The grey-breasted babbler (Malacopteron albogulare) is a species of bird in the family Pellorneidae. It is found in Brunei, Indonesia and Malaysia. Its natural habitats are subtropical or tropical moist lowland forest and subtropical or tropical swampland. It is threatened by habitat loss.
