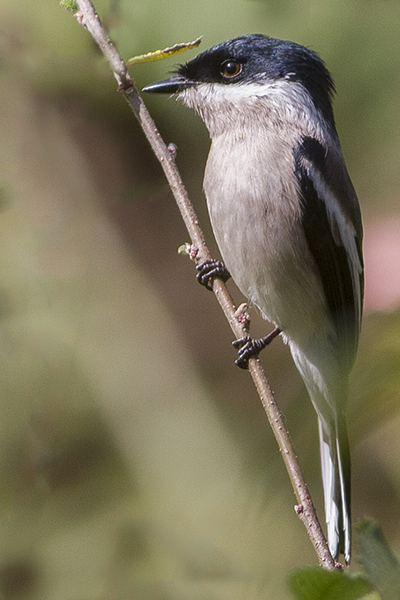
- Hemipus picatus capitalis from Uttarakhand, India Calls of H. p. picatus (South India)

Conservation status
- Least Concern (IUCN 3.1)

Scientific classification
- Kingdom: Animalia
- Phylum: Chordata
- Class: Aves
- Order: Passeriformes
- Family: Vangidae
- Genus: Hemipus
- Species: H. picatus

Binomial name
- Hemipus picatus (Sykes, 1832)

Subspecies
- H. p. picatus (Sykes, 1832); H. p. capitalis (Horsfield, 1840); H. p. leggei Whistler, 1939; H. p. intermedius Salvadori, 1879

Synonyms
- Muscicapa picata Hemipus picaecolor

= Bar-winged flycatcher-shrike =

Species of bird

The bar-winged flycatcher-shrike (Hemipus picatus) is a small passerine bird usually placed in the Vangidae. It is found in the forests of tropical southern Asia from the Himalayas and hills of southern India to Indonesia. Mainly insectivorous it is found hunting in the mid-canopy of forests, often joining mixed-species foraging flocks. They perch upright and have a distinctive pattern of black and white, males being more shiny black than the females. In some populations the colour of the back is brownish while others have a dark wash on the underside.

== Description ==
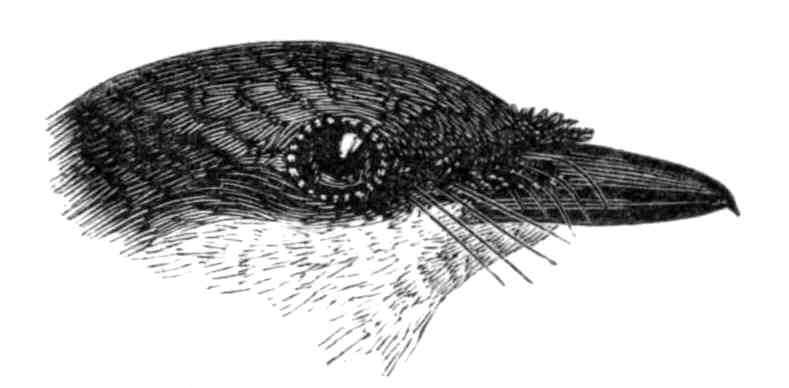
Head showing hook-tipped beak and rictal bristles

The bar-winged flycatcher-shrike is black capped with black wings that contrast with the white of the body. A white slash across the wing and a white rump stand out in contrast. They sit upright on branches, flying around to glean insects. The nostril is hidden by hairs and the upper mandible of the beak has a curved tip. Males are velvety black while females tend to be greyish brown but the pattern varies across the geographic populations. Both males and females of the Himalayan H. p. capitalis have a brown back but the males have a black head. The Sri Lankan population leggei lacks sexual dimorphism in plumage. H. p. intermedius has only the females with a brownish back. The tail is black but the outer tail feathers are white while the non-central tail feathers are tipped with white.

The call is a rapid and high tsit-it-it-it or a whriri-whirriri-whirriri and sometimes a sharp chip. Male-female pairs of the subspecies leggei of Sri Lanka have been reported to duet with precision.

Young birds are said to have a broken pattern of white and grey giving the appearance of lichens.

The exact systematic family position is unclear but the genus Hemipus has been found to be closely related to the genus Tephrodornis and show affinities to the Malaconotidae of Africa.

== Distribution ==
Subspecies

The nominate race is found mainly in the Western Ghats of India but becoming very rare towards the Surat Dangs. They are also found in some parts of central and eastern India, extending into Bangladesh. The subspecies capitalis is found along the Himalayas from Simla, east to Manipur and Chittagong in India and extending into northern Thailand, Myanmar and Laos.

Subspecies leggei of Sri Lanka (southern Western Ghats populations included in older works) has the sexes indistinguishable. It is found in the hill forests of Sri Lanka.

Subspecies intermedius is found in Southeast Asia in Sumatra, Borneo, and parts of the Malay Peninsula. The brownish grey wash on the breast of females is darker, contrasting with the white of the abdomens. The back is darker brown than in other subspecies. The males also have darker breasts.

Other subspecies that have been described such as Walter Koelz's pileatus (described from the Lushai Hills) and insulae (from Sri Lanka) are not considered valid.

== Behaviour and ecology ==
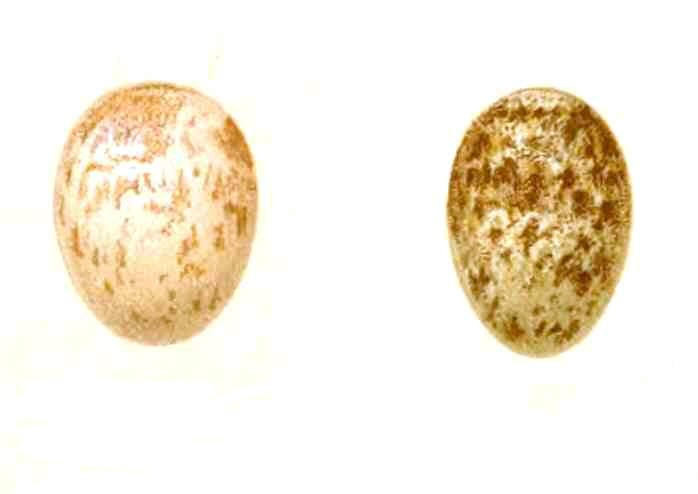
Eggs of H. p. capitalis (left) and H. p. picatus (right)

This bird catches insects by gleaning foliage and making aerial sallies for flushed insects. It will associate with other small birds such as babblers, velvet-fronted nuthatch and white-eyes in feeding flocks. They move through the forest and rarely stick to a particular location.

The nesting season in Sri Lanka is mainly from February to August, March to May in India. The nest is a neat cup with rim held stiff by cobwebs binding it and the inside is lined with fine grass and fibre. Lichens cover the surface of the nest cup which is placed on the horizontal surface of a dry branch, often close to the tip of a dead branch or on a leafless tree making it appear like a knot in the wood. The usual clutch is 2 or 3 eggs which are pale greenish white and blotched with black and grey. The bird sitting at the nest appears as if it is casually perched. Both males and females incubate. The chicks at nest stay still with eyes closed and face the center of the nest while holding their bills high giving the appearance of a broken branch.

They have been said to be sensitive to forest degradation but some studies note that they are less sensitive and capable of persisting even in considerably disturbed forests.
