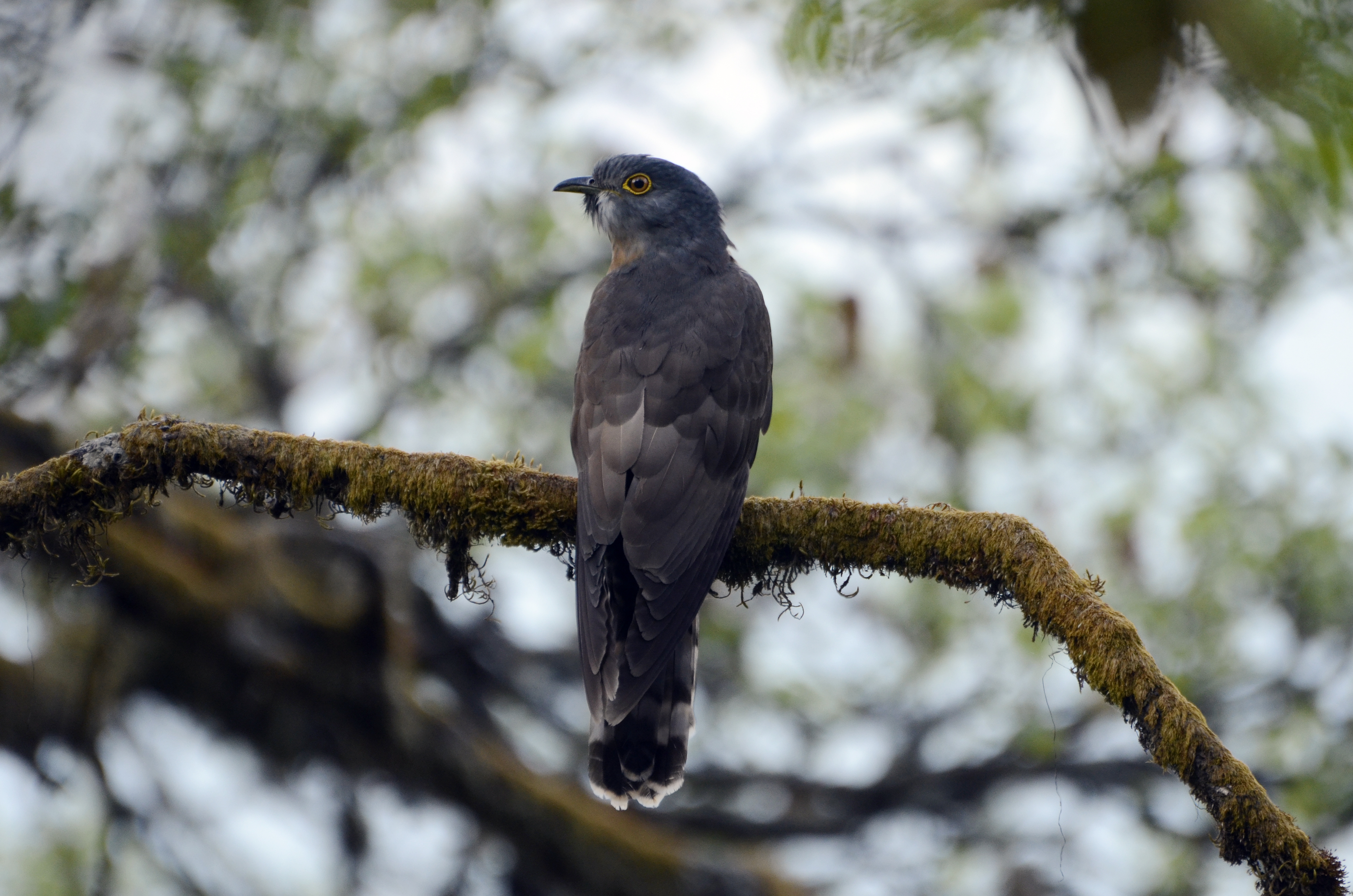

Conservation status
- Least Concern (IUCN 3.1)

Scientific classification
- Kingdom: Animalia
- Phylum: Chordata
- Class: Aves
- Order: Cuculiformes
- Family: Cuculidae
- Genus: Hierococcyx
- Species: H. sparverioides

Binomial name
- Hierococcyx sparverioides (Vigors, 1832)

Synonyms
- Cuculus sparverioides

Audio
- Calls

= Large hawk-cuckoo =

Species of bird

The large hawk-cuckoo (Hierococcyx sparverioides) is a species of cuckoo in the family Cuculidae. It has a wide breeding distribution from temperate Asia along the Himalayas extending to East Asia. Many populations winter further south. They are known for their loud and repetitive calls which are similar to that of the common hawk-cuckoo but do not rise in crescendo. They are also somewhat larger and adults can be readily told apart from the smaller common hawk-cuckoo by the black patch on the chin. They are brood-parasites of babblers and laughing-thrushes.

== Distribution ==
It is found in Bangladesh, Bhutan, Cambodia, China, India, Indonesia, Laos, Malaysia, Myanmar, Nepal, Pakistan, the Philippines, Singapore, Taiwan, Thailand, and Vietnam. Found as a vagrant on Christmas Island. The subspecies H. s. bocki of the Malay Peninsula, Sumatra and Borneo is usually considered a separate species, the dark hawk-cuckoo.

== Habitats ==
Its natural habitats are temperate forest and subtropical or tropical mangrove forest.

== Behaviour ==
They call in summer and calling goes on well after dusk. In their winter grounds, they tend to be silent.

Like many other cuckoos, this species is a brood parasite. Many laughing-thrushes (example Pterorhinus sannio) are capable of detecting the eggs of the cuckoo and remove them. The cuckoos lay eggs that mimic those of their hosts.

List of the large hawk cuckoo's known nest-hosts
- Actinodura nipalensis
- Alcippe nipalensis
- Arachnothera longirostris
- Arachnothera magna
- Brachypteryx leucophris
- Brachypteryx nipalensis
- Cettia fortipes
- Liocichla phoenicea
- Ianthocincla cineracea
- Ianthocincla rufogularis
- Trochalopteron lineatum
- Trochalopteron erythrocephalum
- Garrulax monileger
- Pterorhinus pectoralis
- Pterorhinus caerulatus
- Pterorhinus mitratus
- Geokichla citrina
- Lanius cristatus
- Lanius nigriceps
- Leiothrix lutea
- Muscicapa hodgsoni
- Muscicapa macgregoriae
- Muscicapa parva
- Muscicapa rubeculoides
- Myophonus caeruleus
- Pellorneum ignotum
- Pellorneum ruficeps
- Pomatorhinus erythrogenys
- Pycnonotus cafer
- Stachyris nigriceps
- Stachyris ruficeps
- Stachyris rufifrons
- Suya khasiana
- Turdoides sp.
- Turdus dauma
- Yuhina flavicollis
- Yuhina occipitalis
