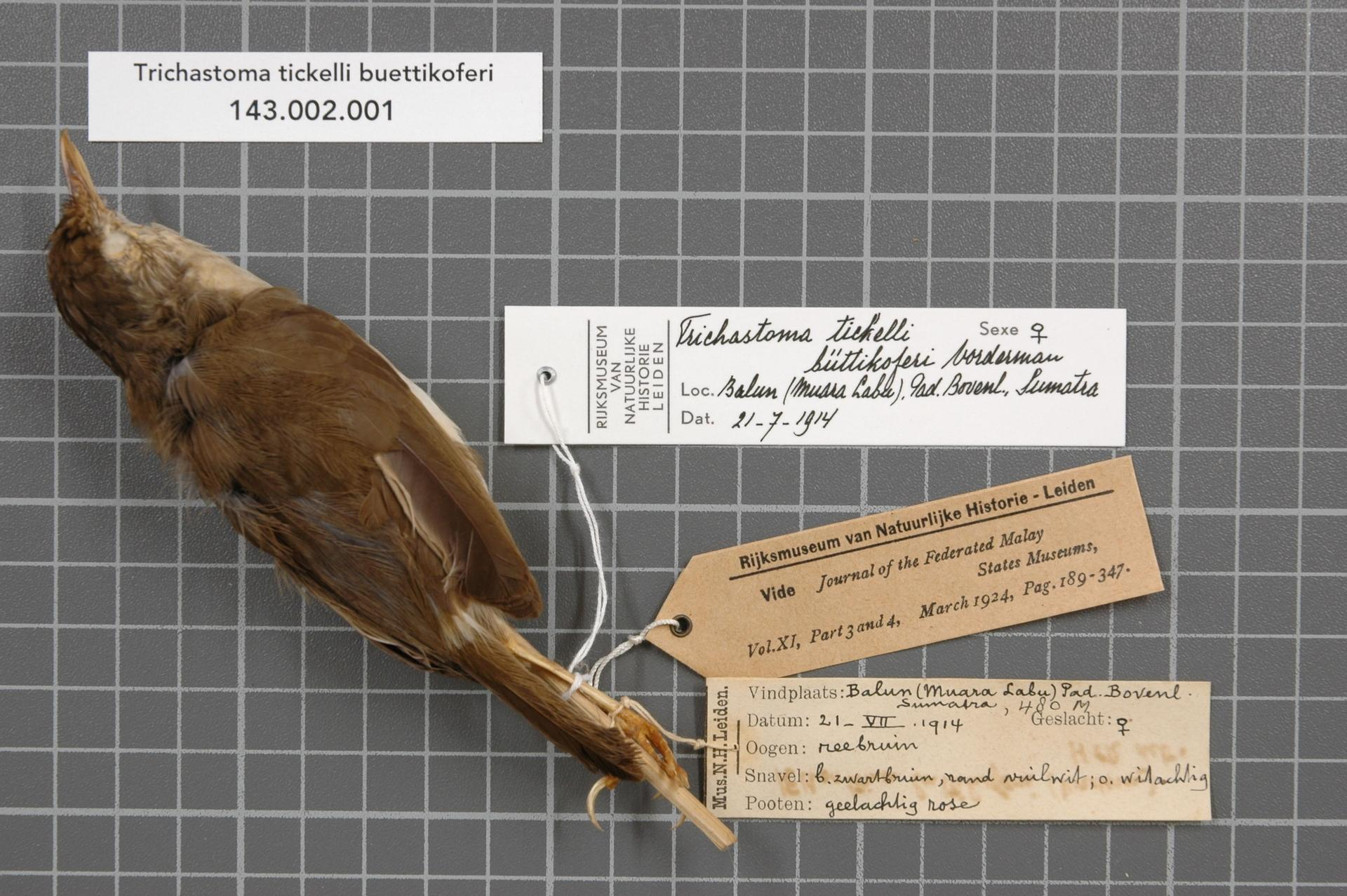

Conservation status
- Near Threatened (IUCN 3.1)

Scientific classification
- Kingdom: Animalia
- Phylum: Chordata
- Class: Aves
- Order: Passeriformes
- Family: Pellorneidae
- Genus: Pellorneum
- Species: P. buettikoferi

Binomial name
- Pellorneum buettikoferi (Vorderman, 1892)

Synonyms
- Trichastoma buettikoferi

= Sumatran babbler =

Species of bird

The Sumatran babbler (Pellorneum buettikoferi) is a species of bird in the family Pellorneidae.

== Distribution and habitat ==
It is endemic to Indonesia. Its natural habitats are subtropical or tropical moist lowland forest and subtropical or tropical moist montane forest. It is threatened by habitat loss. It used to be considered a subspecies of the buff-breasted babbler.
