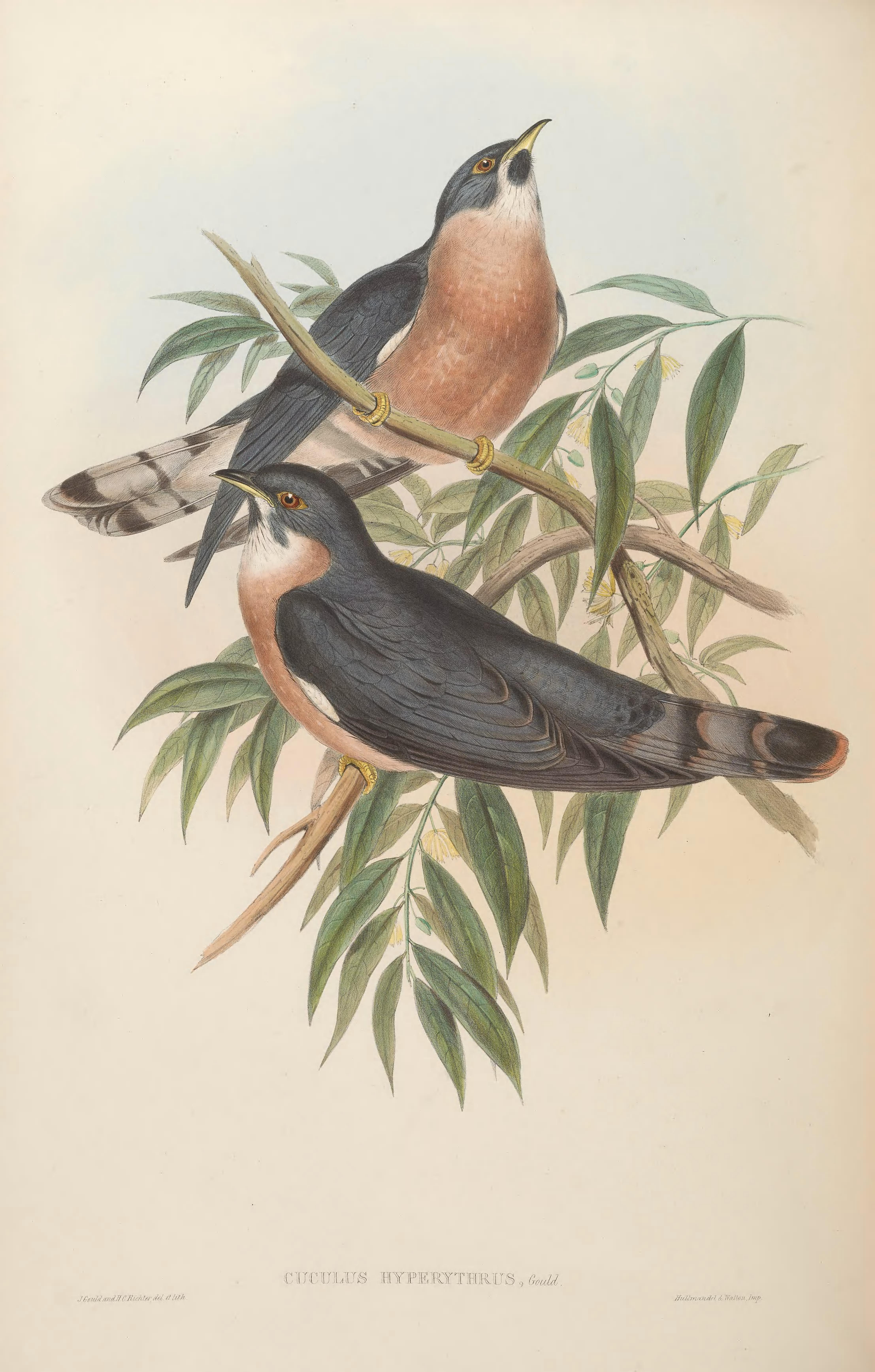

Conservation status
- Least Concern (IUCN 3.1)

Scientific classification
- Kingdom: Animalia
- Phylum: Chordata
- Class: Aves
- Order: Cuculiformes
- Family: Cuculidae
- Genus: Hierococcyx
- Species: H. hyperythrus

Binomial name
- Hierococcyx hyperythrus (Gould, 1856)
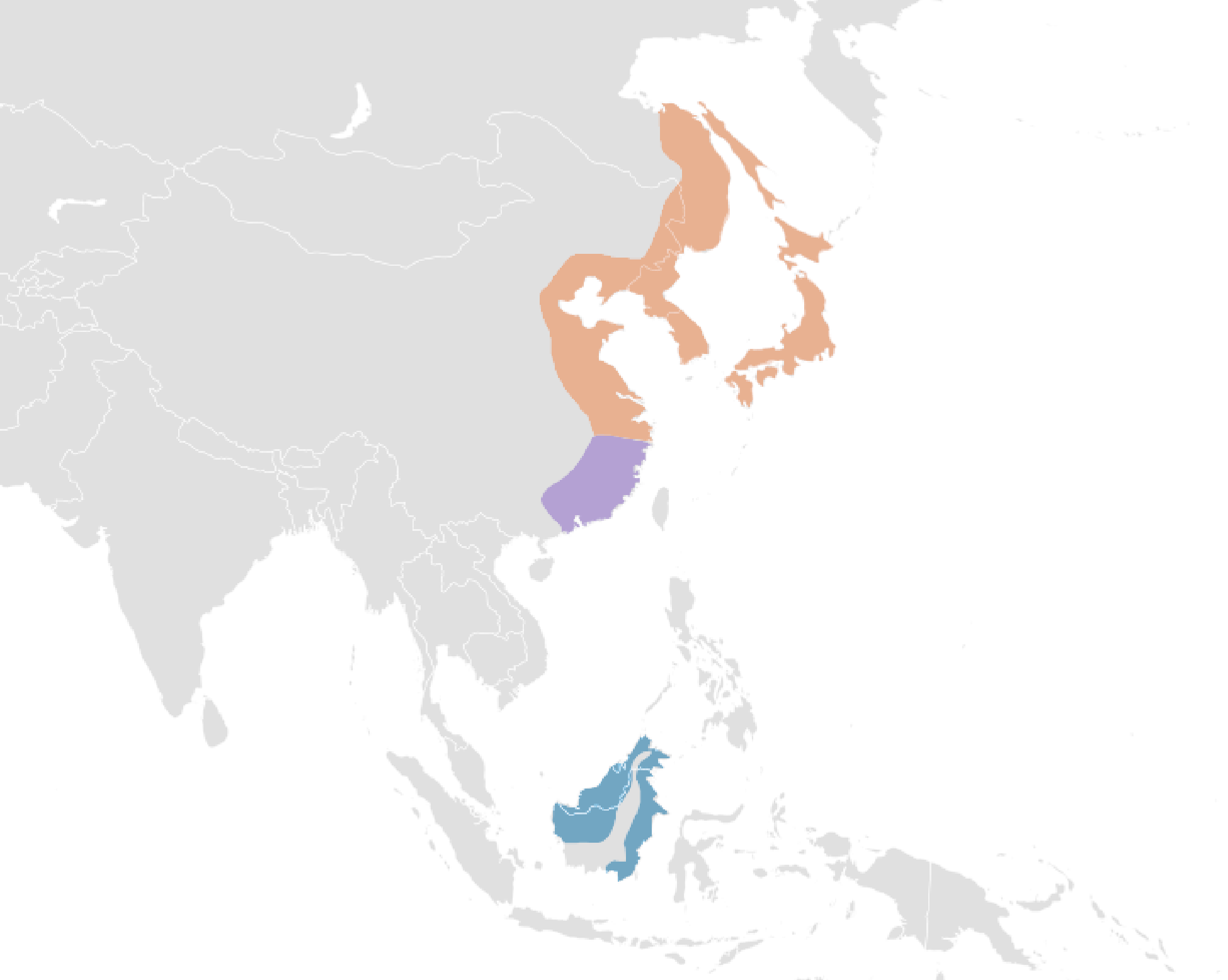
- Approximate distribution map Breeding range Year-round range Wintering range

= Northern hawk-cuckoo =

Species of bird

The northern hawk-cuckoo or rufous hawk-cuckoo (Hierococcyx hyperythrus) is a species of cuckoo found in eastern China, North and South Korea, far eastern Russia, and Japan. Northern populations migrate to overwinter in Borneo. This elusive species is considered rare over most of its range and many of its life history traits remain understudied. It is known to perch in the crowns of tall trees, making direct observation difficult.

The northern hawk-cuckoo, along with the Malaysian hawk-cuckoo (Hierococcyx fugax) and the Hodgson’s hawk-cuckoo (Hierococcyx nisicolor), were all once considered the same species, H. fugax. All three were recently split into their own monotypic species.

The genus Hierococcyx are called hawk-cuckoos due to their broad, rounded wings and plumage which lend them great resemblance to Japanese and Chinese sparrowhawks. They are similar enough that in the field hawk-cuckoos are often mistaken for an Accipiter.

== Description ==
The northern hawk-cuckoo is one of the smallest in the genus Hierococcyx at 28-30 cm in length, a weight between 99.0-147.8 g, and an average wing length of 20.2 cm, although measurements can vary slightly between sexes.

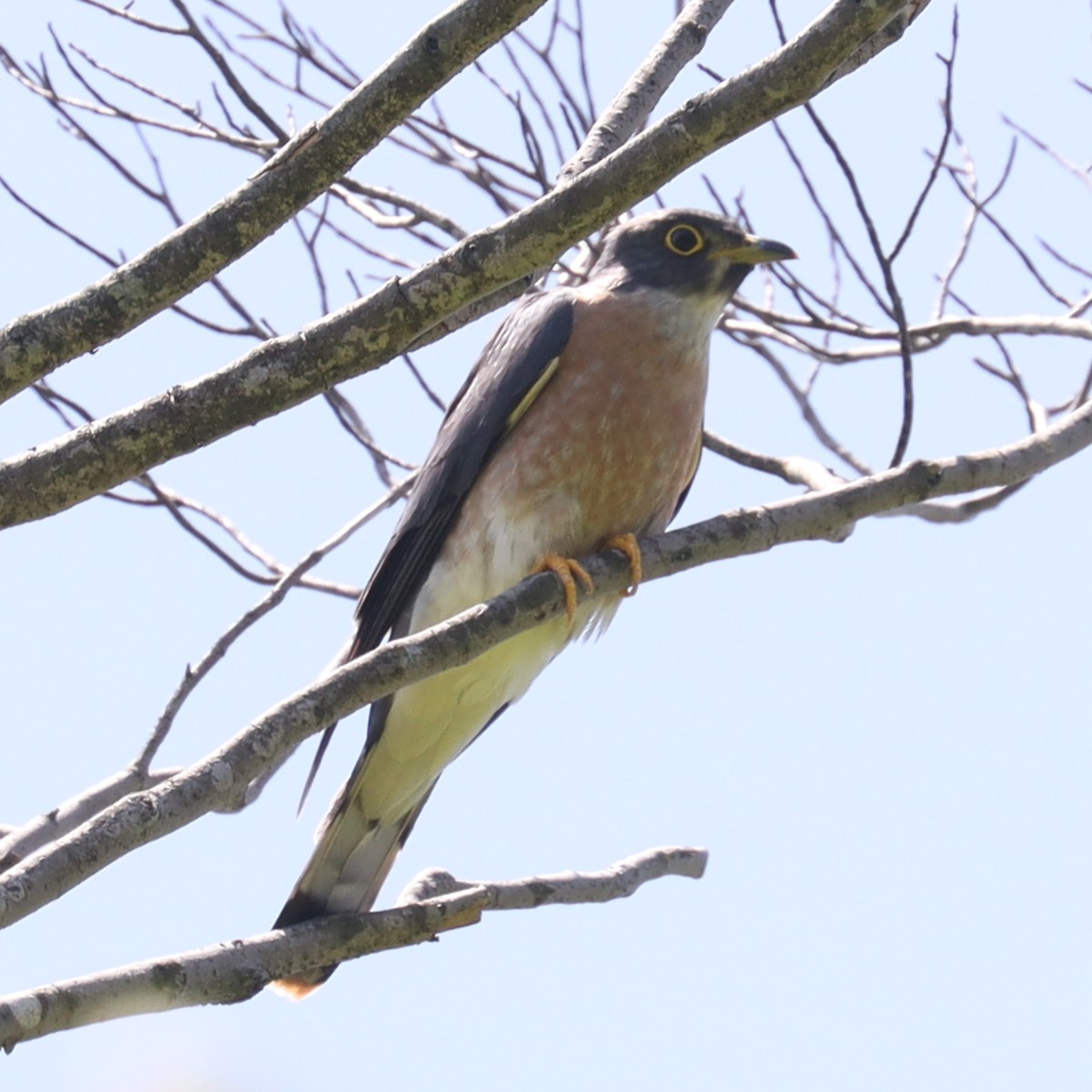
Northern hawk-cuckoo adult in tree

Both sexes sport similar colouring with rump, back, and wings slate grey and underparts rusty red. Inner flight feathers form a white patch on folded wings when perched. Some individuals sport white patch on nape from juvenile feathering. Head and upper cheeks slate grey with a white throat and grey chin, lower cheeks rusty red blending into rest of underparts. Yellow eyering with orange, brown or white iris. Beak basally yellow with black tip. Under tail coverts white. Tail is lined with 3-4 narrow black bands and wide light grey bands, ending with a large black subterminal band and a rufous tip.

Subadult similar to adult colouring except for rufous feathers on lower back and irregular black streaks and spot on flanks and breast.

Juvenile crown brown with white spotting on nape and irregular streaks of brown and rufous red on back. Rump and wings brown with white wing patch visible as in adult. Underparts white with black streaks and spots. Tail banded with both large bands and tip rufous red. Face and chin slate grey with yellow eyering, dark brown iris, and yellow feet.

Young nestling are naked with pinkish skin that blackens over time. Distal plate and gape edge yellow, interior of mouth pink with black lines. Underpart of wings sport yellow patches, similar in colour to gape and hypothesized to aid in begging for food from host parents.

== Taxonomy ==
The northern hawk-cuckoo is placed in the genus Hierococcyx (hawk cuckoos), which contains eight species of birds residing in southeastern Asia. Its genus name, hyperythrus, is derived from the ancient Greek words hupo meaning “beneath” and eruthros meaning “red”. This could be a reference to its rufous underparts.

The taxonomy of northern hawk-cuckoo, and the larger grouping named the Hierococcyx fugax species complex of which it resided in for a time, has long been disputed. Originally, the northern hawk-cuckoo, Malaysian hawk-cuckoo (H. fugax), Hodgson’s hawk-cuckoo (H. nisicolor), and the Philippine hawk-cuckoo (H. pectoralis) were each described as their own separate species. In 1940, James Lee Peters’ Check-list of the Birds of the World re-classified all four species under H. fugax, creating the Hierococcyx fugax species complex. Later, Sibley and Monroe’s 1993 classification synonymized nisicolor with fugax, leading to further confusion between the two then subspecies and their respective common names. This grouping was considered the standard taxonomy until 1997, when Robert B. Payne split H. pectoralis into its own species due to distinct differences in its song.

In 2002, the remaining subspecies were split into three monotypic species by Ben F. King in his research paper on the Hierococcyx fugax species complex. H. hyperythrus was split due to its differing song, its highly migratory nature, and its wings and tail being significantly longer than its conspecifics. H. nisicolor and H. fugax had identical songs, but were split due to differences in their adult plumage and several morphometric traits.

== Distribution ==
Located in northeastern Asia. Breeds from southern Amurland in southeastern Siberia, including Sakahlin island, to northeastern China and Japan. Overwinters in Borneo and the Philippines, rarely to Indonesia. Resident and winter populations can be found in southeastern provinces of Fujian and Guangdong in China. Winter range is difficult to ascertain due to previous taxonomic classification and low recorded sightings.

== Habitat ==
Have been recorded from lowlands to up to 2800m (2300 m in Japan). In Japan they prefer deciduous, semi-evergreen, or broadleaf evergreen forest. Also are known to occur in secondary forested areas, plantations, bamboo jungles, and deep ravines with rivers. Prefers spruce, fir, or larch forests in Japanese alps. Russian populations can be found in Siberian pine, silver fir, maple, ash, cedar, hornbeam, oak, and mixed taiga forests.

== Vocalization ==
Most vocal during overcast weather, at twilight, or during breeding season when calling is heard at all hours of the night and day. All hawk-cuckoos produce two vocalization types, a song and a “long call”. The northern hawk-cuckoo song is a two part buzzy whistle, “weeweepeeit" or “weeweepeeweit”. The first note is held for 0.3 s at 3kHz, then the second notes drops and rises at the end to 4kHz. It is often repeated several times in a row, with increasing pitch and speed.

Their long call is frantic in pace and near painful in its intensity. The 3 s long shrill whistle, “weeteetitditdiditdidittitititititititi,” rapidly crescendos in pitch, climaxes, then tails off. The long calls are sung much less frequently and vary more in structure than their songs. The long call’s function remains unknown.

Young fledglings make a repeated buzz when begging.

== Diet ==
Insectivore, prefers larvae of silkworms, hawk moths, sawflies, cicadas, and beetles. In Japan, ants are the second most consumed after larvae. Have been observed to eat fruit on occasion, little is known on their foraging behaviour.

== Reproduction ==
The northern hawk cuckoo is a brood parasite. Females lay from mid-May until August in Japan and are hypothesized to lay from May to July in South Korea. Known hosts in Japan are: the Japanese thrush (Turdus cardis), brown-headed thrush (Turdus chrysolaus), Japanese robin (Larvivora akahige), Siberian blue robin (Larvivora cyane), orange-flanked bush-robin (Tarsiger cyanurus), common stonechat (Saxicola torquatus), Asian brown flycatcher (Muscicapa dauurica), narcissus flycatcher (Ficedula narcissina), blue-and-white flycatcher (Cyanoptila cyanomelana), olive-backed pipit (Anthus hodgsoni), Japanese paradise-flycatcher (Terpsiphone atrocaudata)^{,} and rarely the Eurasian skylark (Alauda arvensis).

Eggs are light blue and unmarked, weighing 5.6 g and measuring 28x20 mm. Only one phenotype of eggs has been described, which is uncommon for a cuckoo with over 10 host species. Research has shown there is a clear linear relationship between the number of host species of a brood parasitic cuckoo and the number of egg phenotypes within a population. Lack of data on this rare and understudied species likely explains the northern hawk-cuckoo’s deviance from the normal trend. The incubation period of the eggs is unknown and the nestling period lasts from 19-20 days.

Most brood parasites nestlings beg for food the same way that the host’s chicks do—by calling, gaping their mouths, and shaking their wings when the host parent returns to the nest. However, loud begging calls can attract predators. To reduce this risk, it is hypothesized that the northern hawk-cuckoo nestling has evolved a new, quieter method of begging. Instead of calling, the young nestlings raise and shake one wing to display a gape coloured underwing patch. These patches (one is present under each wing) are the same bright yellow as their mouths and stimulate the host parents to increase their feeding rates. Their likeness to a gape is convincing enough that host parents have been observed trying to feed the patches themselves, although this happens rarely.
