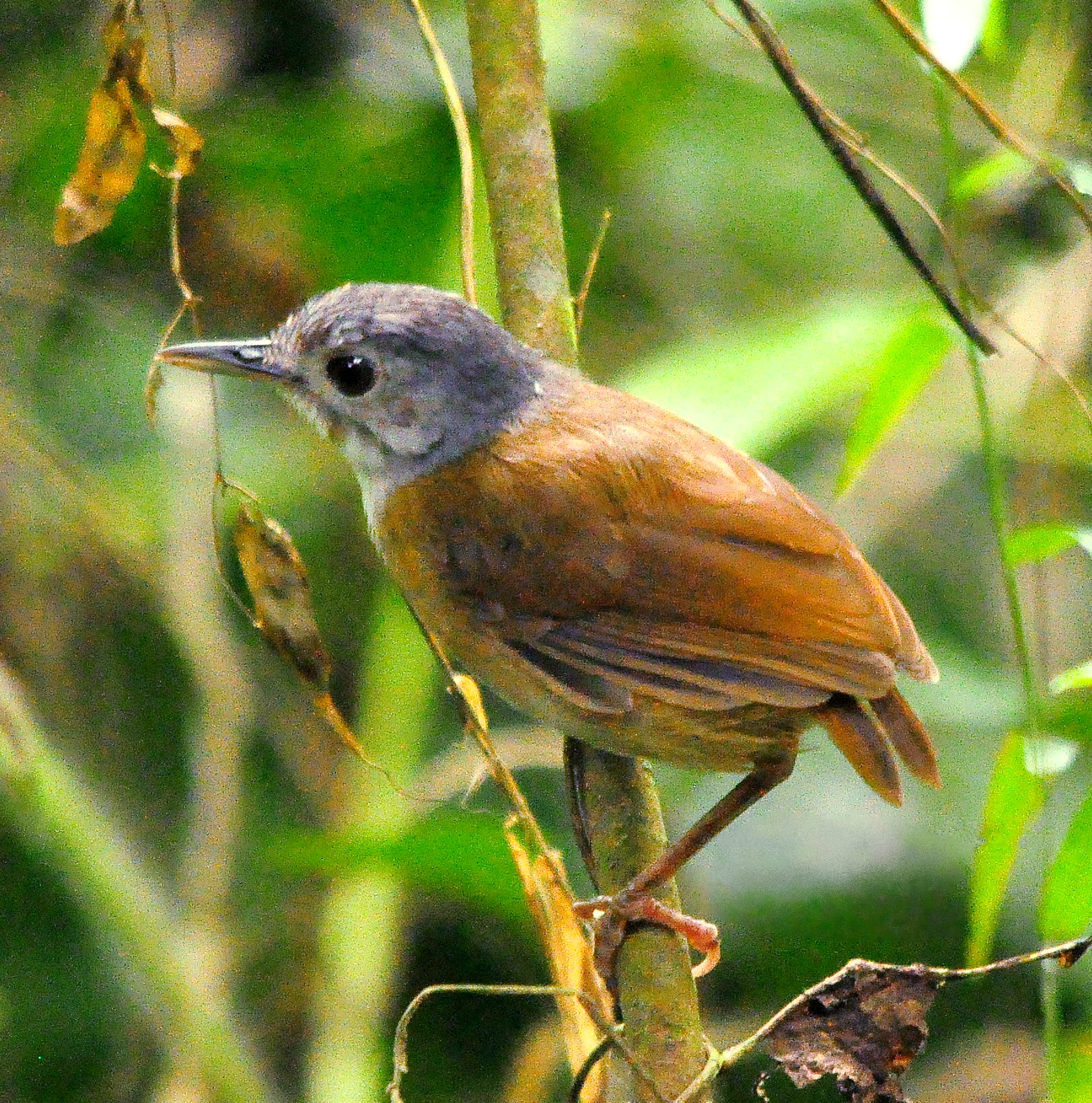

Conservation status
- Least Concern (IUCN 3.1)

Scientific classification
- Kingdom: Animalia
- Phylum: Chordata
- Class: Aves
- Order: Passeriformes
- Family: Pellorneidae
- Genus: Pellorneum
- Species: P. cinereiceps

Binomial name
- Pellorneum cinereiceps (Tweeddale, 1878)

Synonyms
- Drymocataphus cinereiceps Tweeddale, 1878; Malacocincla cinereiceps (Tweeddale, 1878); Trichastoma cinereiceps (Tweeddale, 1878)

= Ashy-headed babbler =

Species of bird

The ashy-headed babbler (Pellorneum cinereiceps) is a species of passerine bird in the ground babbler family Pellorneidae. The species is also known as the ashy-crowned babbler. The species is closely related to the short-tailed babbler. The two species are sometimes treated as the same species but differ in their calls. The species is monotypic, meaning it has no subspecies.

== Description and taxonomy ==
The ashy-headed babbler is 13 cm (5.1 in) long and weighs 22–26 g (0.78–0.92 oz). The crown and nape are grey, and the rest of the face is light grey except for a moustachial stripe. The upperparts, upperwing and tail are ochre-brown, the throat, breast and belly are white with a narrow ochre wash across the breast and along the flanks. The legs are pinkish and the bill is grey above and pink below. The sexes are the same. The calls include a nasal jhieu-jhieu-jhieu-jhieu.

It was formerly conspecific with the short-tailed babbler but is differentiated by its voice.

== Behaviour and ecology ==
The behaviour of this species is poorly known. Nothing is known about its diet, but it is assumed to eat small invertebrates. It feeds singly or in pairs and close to the ground, in a manner very similar to the short-tailed babbler. It is inquisitive and flicks its wings while foraging.

The breeding season of the ashy-headed babbler is between April and September. They nest on the ground at the base of rattan (a type of climbing palm); the nest is a cup of grasses, rattan fibres and bamboo leaves, lined with lichens and moss. Two eggs are laid, which can be white with red or brown spots or blue with dark brown speckles.

== Habitat and conservation status ==
It is endemic to Palawan in the Philippines. The species is found in primary forest and secondary forest as well as scrubland, from sea-level to 1,300 m (4,300 ft). The species is non-migratory.

It is assessed as least-concern species under the International Union for Conservation of Nature. Its population is said to be declining as Palawan's forests are under threat due to illegal logging, deforestation, land conversion and mining. The whole of Palawan was designated as a Biosphere Reserve; however, protection and enforcement of laws has been difficult and these threats still continue. It occurs in just one protected area in the Puerto Princesa Subterranean River National Park.
