= Badiar National Park =

National park in Guinea

- IUCN category II (national park)
- Location within Guinea
- Location: Guinea
- Nearest city: Koundara
- Coordinates: 12.5969944°N 13.346622°W
- Area: 1,228 km^{2} (474 sq mi)
- Established: 1985

Badiar National Park (French: Parc National du Badiar) is a national park in Guinea, on the border with Senegal and contiguous with Senegal's much larger Niokolo-Koba National Park. It was established on 30 May 1985 (by ordonnance N°124/PRG/85), partly in response to Senegal's concern about poaching in Niokolo-Koba National Park. Badiar is an International Union for Conservation of Nature Category II park.

== Geography ==
The park consists of two separate areas: the Mafou sector of 554 km^{2} (214 sq mi) and the Kouya sector of 674 km^{2} (260 sq mi). There is also a buffer sector of 5,916 km^{2} (2,284 sq mi) around the Mafou sector. The principal rivers are the Koulountou (one of the two main tributaries of the Gambia River) and the Mitji. The annual rainfall averages 1,000 to 1,500 mm (39 to 59 in), mostly during the rainy season of June–October.

=== Environment ===
The park is an important ecosystem, with a large variety of vertebrate species and vascular plants. It is one of the three core areas of the Badiar Biosphere Reserve, established in 2002 and covering 2,843 square kilometres (1,098 sq mi), that also includes the neighbouring forest of Southern Badiar and the Forest of Ndama. The terrain includes savanna, open woodlands and gallery forest. The eastern part of the park contains scrub woodland, while the western part is characterised by wooded savanna and open forest. Endangered plant species include Ceiba pentandra, Cassia sieberiana and Combretum micranthum.

Endangered animal species found within the park include the Western red colobus, western chimpanzee, white stork, African rock python and ball python. Other resident species include the African elephant, roan antelope, kob, giant eland, leopard, spotted hyena and Guinea baboon. The park has been designated an Important Bird Area (IBA) by BirdLife International because it supports significant populations of violet turacos, red-throated bee-eaters, blue-bellied rollers, Senegal parrots, piapiacs, black-capped babblers, purple starlings, white-crowned robin-chats, bar-breasted firefinches and Sahel bush sparrows.
