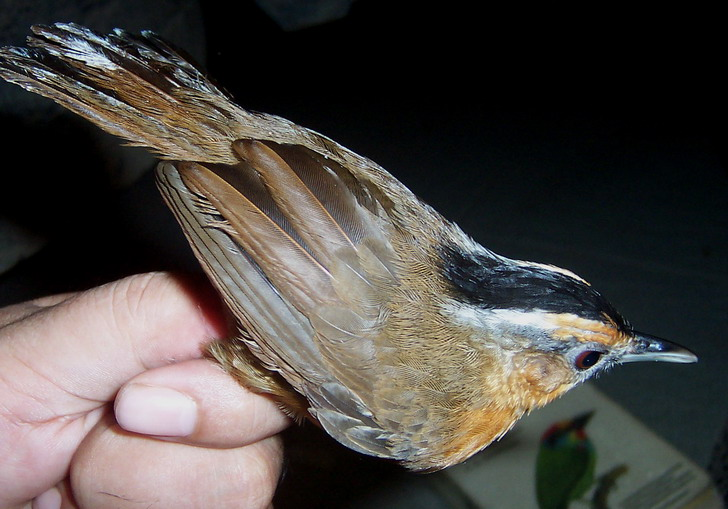
- Javan black-capped babbler Pellorneum capistratum

Scientific classification
- Kingdom: Animalia
- Phylum: Chordata
- Class: Aves
- Order: Passeriformes
- Parvorder: Sylviida
- Superfamily: Sylvioidea
- Family: Pellorneidae
- Genus: Pellorneum; Swainson, 1832

Type species
- Pellorneum ruficeps Swainson, 1832

Synonyms
- Trichastoma Blyth, 1842

= Pellorneum =

Genus of birds

Pellorneum is a genus of passerine birds in the family Pellorneidae. Some of its species were formerly placed in the genus Trichastoma.

The genus Pellorneum was introduced in 1832 by the English naturalist William Swainson with Pellorneum ruficeps, the puff-throated babbler, as the type species. The genus name combines the Ancient Greek pellos meaning "dark-coloured" with orneon meaning "bird".

The genus contains the following 18 species:

Image	Common name	Scientific name	Distribution
	Puff-throated babbler	Pellorneum ruficeps	South Asia, Yunna, and Indochina
	Brown-capped babbler	Pellorneum fuscocapillus	Sri Lanka
	Marsh babbler	Pellorneum palustre	Northeast India
	Malayan black-capped babbler	Pellorneum nigrocapitatum	western Malesia
	Javan black-capped babbler	Pellorneum capistratum	Java
	Bornean black-capped babbler	Pellorneum capistratoides	Borneo
	Mourning babbler	Pellorneum malaccense	Malesia
	Glissando babbler	Pellorneum saturatum	Bangka Belitung Islands
	Leaflitter babbler	Pellorneum poliogene	Borneo
	Ashy-headed babbler	Pellorneum cinereiceps	Palawan
	Spot-throated babbler	Pellorneum albiventre	Eastern Himalaya, Yunnan and Indochina
	Buff-breasted babbler	Pellorneum tickelli	Eastern Himalaya, Yunnan and Indochina
	Sumatran babbler	Pellorneum buettikoferi	Bukit Barisan foothills
	Temminck's babbler	Pellorneum pyrrogenys	montane Java and Borneo
	Malayan swamp babbler	Pellorneum rostratum	Malay Peninsula, Sumatra, Riau, Lingga and Belitung
	Bornean swamp babbler	Pellorneum macropterum	Borneo and Banggi Island
	Ferruginous babbler	Pellorneum bicolor	Malesia
	Sulawesi babbler	Pellorneum celebense	Sulawesi
