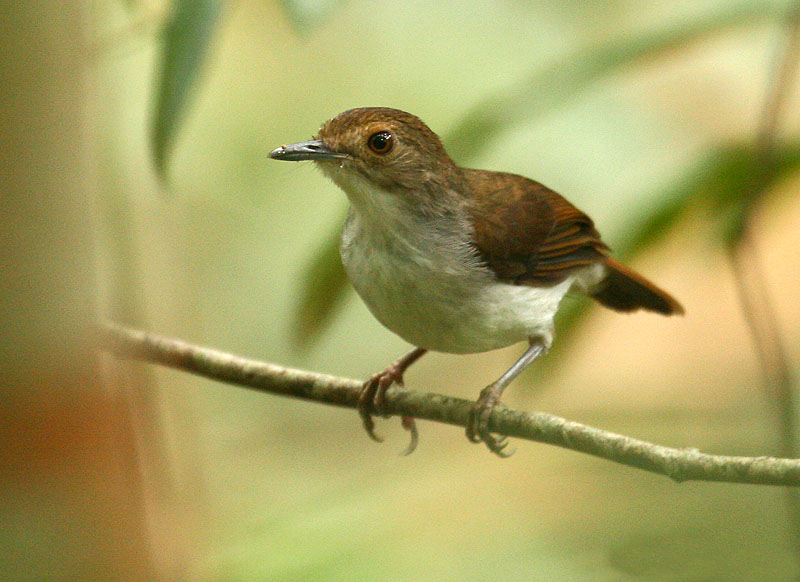

Scientific classification
- Domain: Eukaryota
- Kingdom: Animalia
- Phylum: Chordata
- Class: Aves
- Order: Passeriformes
- Family: Pellorneidae
- Genus: Pellorneum
- Species: P. macropterum

Binomial name
- Pellorneum macropterum (Salvadori, 1868)

= Bornean swamp babbler =

Species of bird

The Bornean swamp babbler (Pellorneum macropterum) is a species of bird in the ground babbler family Pellorneidae that is found in northern and central Borneo and Banggi Island. It was formerly considered to be a subspecies of the white-chested babbler, now renamed the Malayan swamp babbler (Pellorneum rostratum).

== Taxonomy ==
The Bornean swamp babbler was formally described in 1868 by the Italian zoologist Tommaso Salvadori based on a specimen collected in Borneo. He placed it with the shortwings in the genus Brachypteryx and coined the binomial name Brachypteryx macroptera. The specific epithet is from Ancient Greek makropteros meaning "long-winged" (from makros meaning "long" and pteron meaning "wing". The Bornean swamp babbler is now placed in the genus Pellorneum that was introduced in 1832 by the English naturalist William Swainson. It was formerly treated as a subspecies of the white-chested babbler (renamed the Malayan swamp babbler) (Pellorneum rostratum) but based on vocal and genetic differences it is now treated as a separate species and is considered to be monotypic: no subspecies are recognised.
