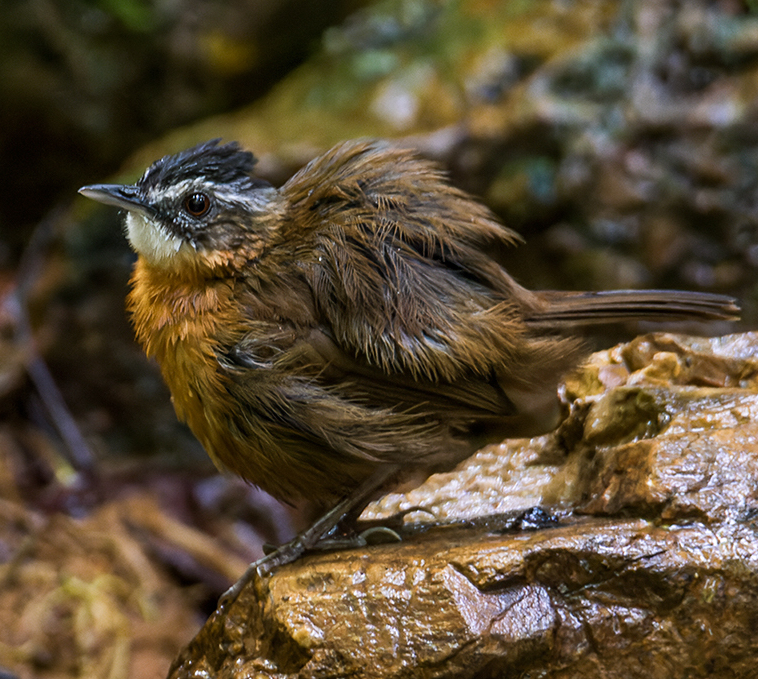

Scientific classification
- Domain: Eukaryota
- Kingdom: Animalia
- Phylum: Chordata
- Class: Aves
- Order: Passeriformes
- Family: Pellorneidae
- Genus: Pellorneum
- Species: P. nigrocapitatum

Binomial name
- Pellorneum nigrocapitatum (Eyton, 1839)

= Malayan black-capped babbler =

Species of bird

The Malayan black-capped babbler (Pellorneum nigrocapitatum) is a species of bird in the family Pellorneidae. It is found on the Malay Peninsula, Sumatra, Bangka Island, Belitung and North Natuna. This species, the Javan black-capped babbler (P. capistratum) and the Bornean black-capped babbler (P. capistratoides) were formerly considered conspecific, but were split from it in 2021. Together they were called the black-capped babbler. Its natural habitat is subtropical or tropical moist lowland forest.
