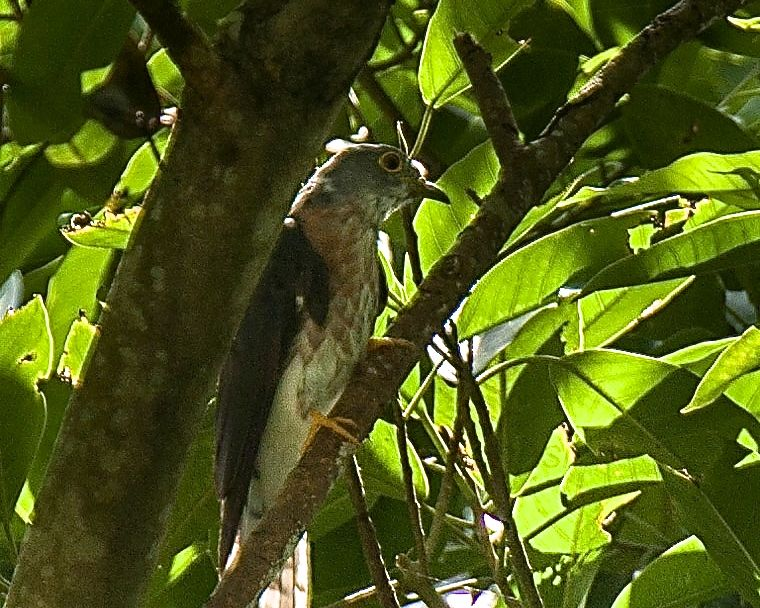
- Philippine hawk-cuckoo (Hierococcyx pectoralis)

Scientific classification
- Kingdom: Animalia
- Phylum: Chordata
- Class: Aves
- Order: Cuculiformes
- Family: Cuculidae
- Genus: Hierococcyx; Müller, 1845

Type species
- Cuculus fugax Horsfield, 1821

Species
- 8, see text

= Hierococcyx =

Genus of birds

Hierococcyx or hawk-cuckoos is a genus of birds in the cuckoo family Cuculidae. They are distributed in South, Southeast, and East Asia. The resemblance to hawks gives this group the generic name of hawk-cuckoos.

They are known to vocalize at their breeding grounds, making identification based on calls easy.

== Taxonomy ==
The genus Hierococcyx was introduced in 1845 by the German naturalists Salomon Müller to accommodate a single species, Cuculus fugax Horsfield, 1821, the Malaysian hawk-cuckoo. This species is the type by monotypy. The genus name combines the Ancient Greek ἱεραξ/hierax, ἱερακος/hierakos meaning "hawk" with κοκκυξ/kokkux, κοκκυγος/kokkugos meaning "cuckoo".

In the past the genus was sometimes included in the genus Cuculus.

== Mimicry ==
Hawk-cuckoos closely resemble accipiters in terms of appearance, an elongated body with long wings and tail, greyish or brownish upperparts with paler barred upperparts, as well as their swift direct flight.

Underpart barring, a form of Batesian mimicry, tends to alarm small birds targeted by hawk-cuckoos for brood parasitism beyond only shape and colour. The seemingly dangerous appearance of the cuckoo reduces host aggression or mobbing, resulting in more opportunities for the cuckoo to parasitise the host.

== Species ==
The genus contains nine species:

Image	Common name	Scientific name	Distribution
	Moustached hawk-cuckoo	Hierococcyx vagans	southern Myanmar including Mergui Archipelago, Malay Peninsula, Sumatra, and Borneo
	Large hawk-cuckoo	Hierococcyx sparverioides	breeds from Himalayas of northeastern Pakistan eastward to southern China, and southwards to hills south of the Brahmaputra River to Taiwan; winters from southern India (Eastern and Western Ghats) eastwards to lowlands of the Malay Peninsula
	Bock's hawk-cuckoo	Hierococcyx bocki	mountains of Malay Peninsula and Sumatra
	Penan hawk-cuckoo	Hierococcyx tiganada	Borneo
	Common hawk-cuckoo	Hierococcyx varius	India to Nepal, Bangladesh, and Myanmar; Sri Lanka
	Northern hawk-cuckoo	Hierococcyx hyperythrus	breeds southeastern Siberia, northeastern China, Korea Peninsula, and Japan; winters to southeastern Asia, northern Borneo, and northern Sulawesi
	Philippine hawk-cuckoo	Hierococcyx pectoralis	Philippines
	Hodgson's hawk-cuckoo	Hierococcyx nisicolor	breeds Himalayas from eastern Nepal and hills south of the Brahmaputra River eastwards to eastern China, from southern Sichuan northeast to Jiangsu and southeast to Hainan, and northern southeastern Asia; winters to Greater Sundas
	Malayan hawk-cuckoo	Hierococcyx fugax	southern Thailand, Malay Peninsula, and Greater Sundas
