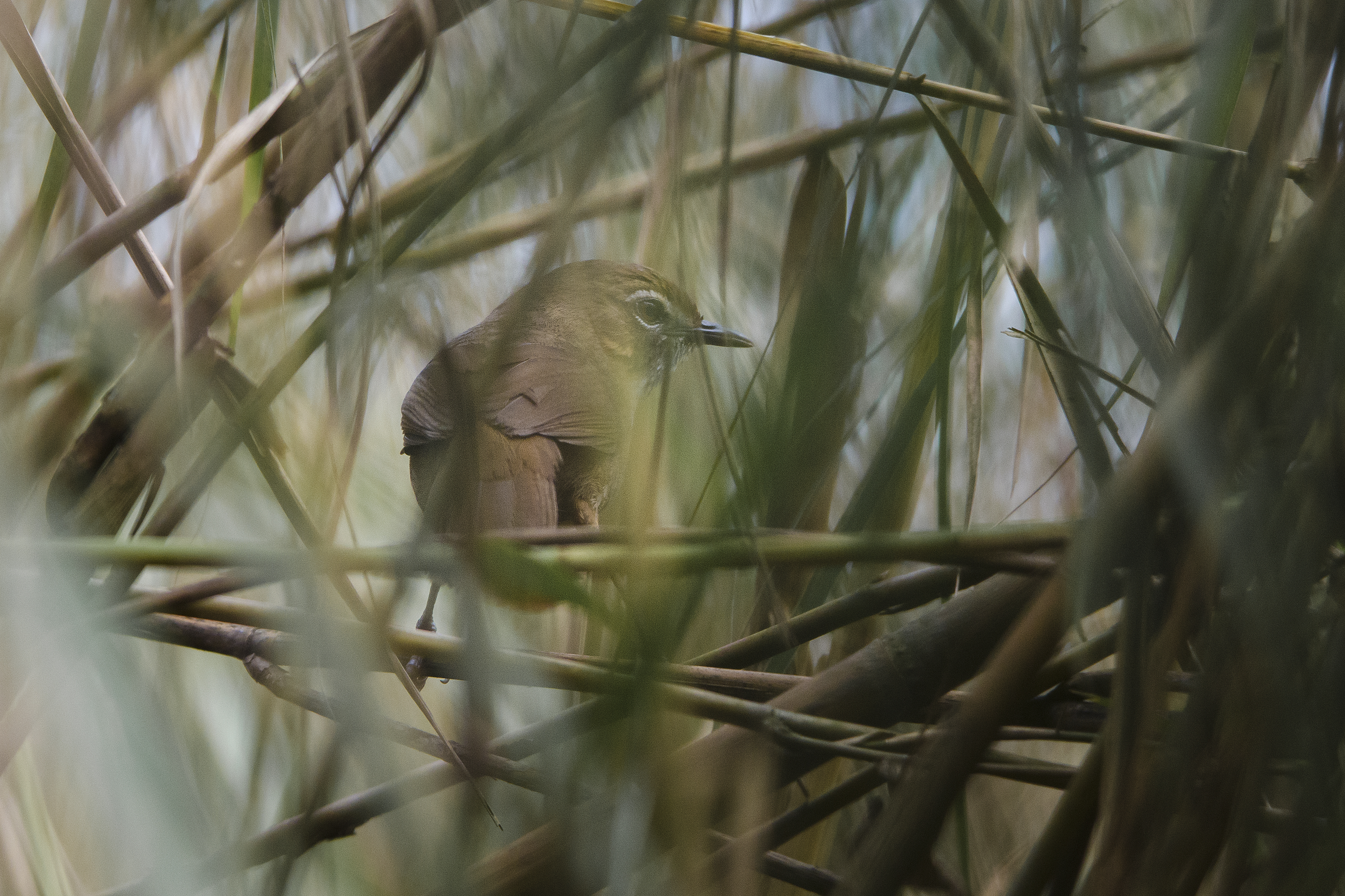

Conservation status
- Vulnerable (IUCN 3.1)

Scientific classification
- Kingdom: Animalia
- Phylum: Chordata
- Class: Aves
- Order: Passeriformes
- Family: Pellorneidae
- Genus: Pellorneum
- Species: P. palustre

Binomial name
- Pellorneum palustre Gould, 1872

= Marsh babbler =

Species of bird

The marsh babbler (Pellorneum palustre) is a member of the family Pellorneidae. The marsh babbler is endemic to the Brahmaputra floodplain, its associated tributaries and adjacent hill ranges in Assam, Arunachal Pradesh and Meghalaya in India and eastern Bangladesh.
