= Black-capped babbler =

Black-capped babbler has been split into the following species:

- Javan black-capped babbler, Pellorneum capistratum
- Malayan black-capped babbler, Pellorneum nigrocapitatum
- Bornean black-capped babbler, Pellorneum capistratoides
