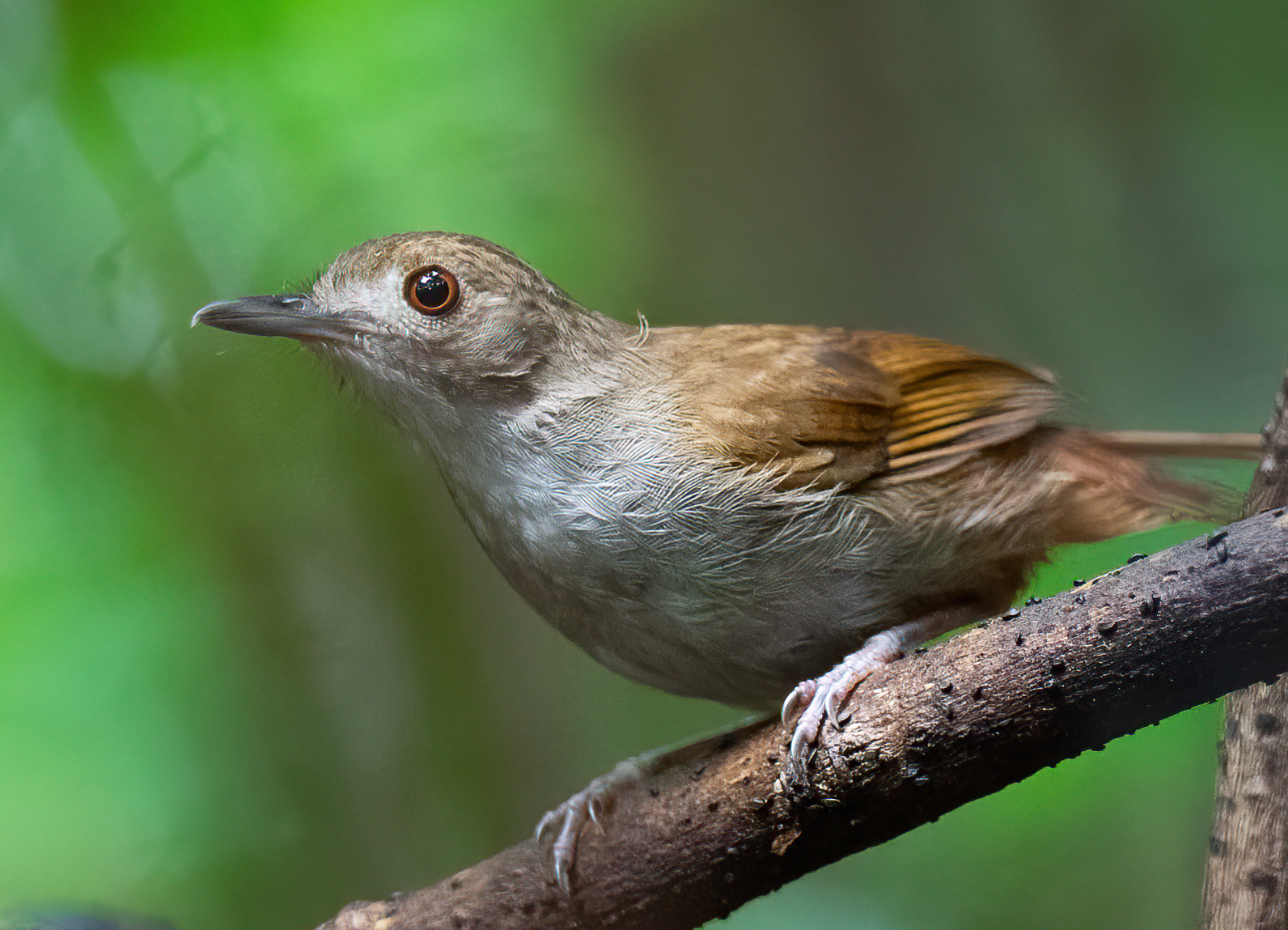

Conservation status
- Least Concern (IUCN 3.1)

Scientific classification
- Kingdom: Animalia
- Phylum: Chordata
- Class: Aves
- Order: Passeriformes
- Family: Pellorneidae
- Genus: Pellorneum
- Species: P. celebense

Binomial name
- Pellorneum celebense (Strickland, 1849)

Synonyms
- Trichastoma celebense

= Sulawesi babbler =

Species of bird

The Sulawesi babbler (Pellorneum celebense) is a species of bird in the family Pellorneidae. It is endemic to Indonesia.
