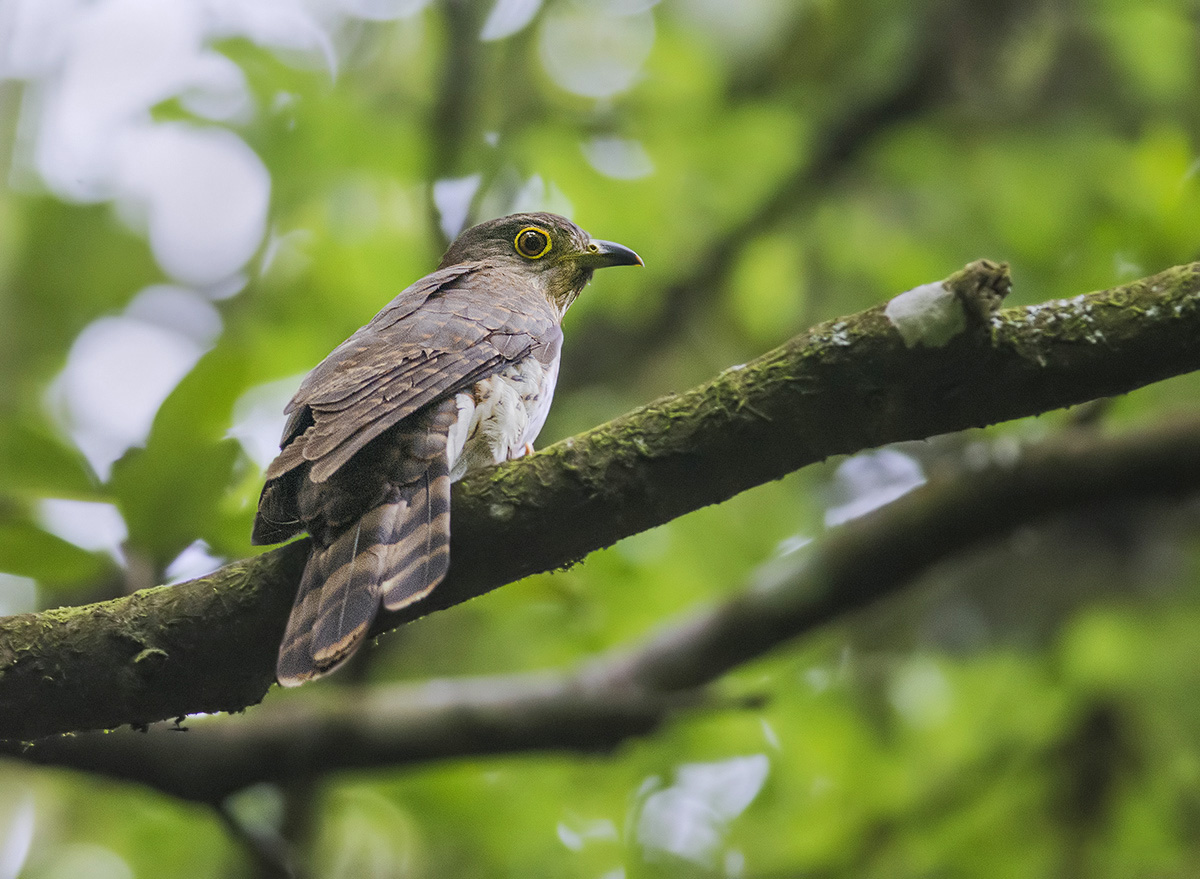
- At Cherrapunji, Meghalaya, India

Conservation status
- Least Concern (IUCN 3.1)

Scientific classification
- Kingdom: Animalia
- Phylum: Chordata
- Class: Aves
- Order: Cuculiformes
- Family: Cuculidae
- Genus: Hierococcyx
- Species: H. nisicolor

Binomial name
- Hierococcyx nisicolor (Blyth, 1843)

= Hodgson's hawk-cuckoo =

Species of bird

Hodgson's hawk-cuckoo (Hierococcyx nisicolor), also known as the whistling hawk-cuckoo, is a species of cuckoo found in north-eastern India, Myanmar, southern China and southeast Asia.

Hodgson's hawk-cuckoo is a brood parasite. The chick evicts bona fide residents of the parasitized nest, thus becoming the sole occupant. Under normal circumstances, this would reduce the provisioning rate as the foster parents see only one gape. To counteract this, the Hodgson's hawk-cuckoo displays gape-coloured patches of skin under its wing to simulate additional gapes; the strategy appears to increase the provisioning rate. This is in contrast to other species of cuckoo (such as the common cuckoo) which increase the rapidity of high pitched hunger calls to increase the provisioning rate.

Although the skin patch is not gape shaped, it is convincing: host parents occasionally place food into the patch.

Hodgson's hawk-cuckoo was formerly regarded as having four subspecies. The Philippine hawk-cuckoo is now commonly treated as a separate species, H. pectoralis. The remaining forms are also now split into three species: Malaysian hawk-cuckoo (H. fugax), Hodgson's hawk-cuckoo (H. nisicolor) and rufous hawk-cuckoo or northern hawk-cuckoo (H. hyperythrus).

The common name commemorates the British naturalist Brian Houghton Hodgson.
