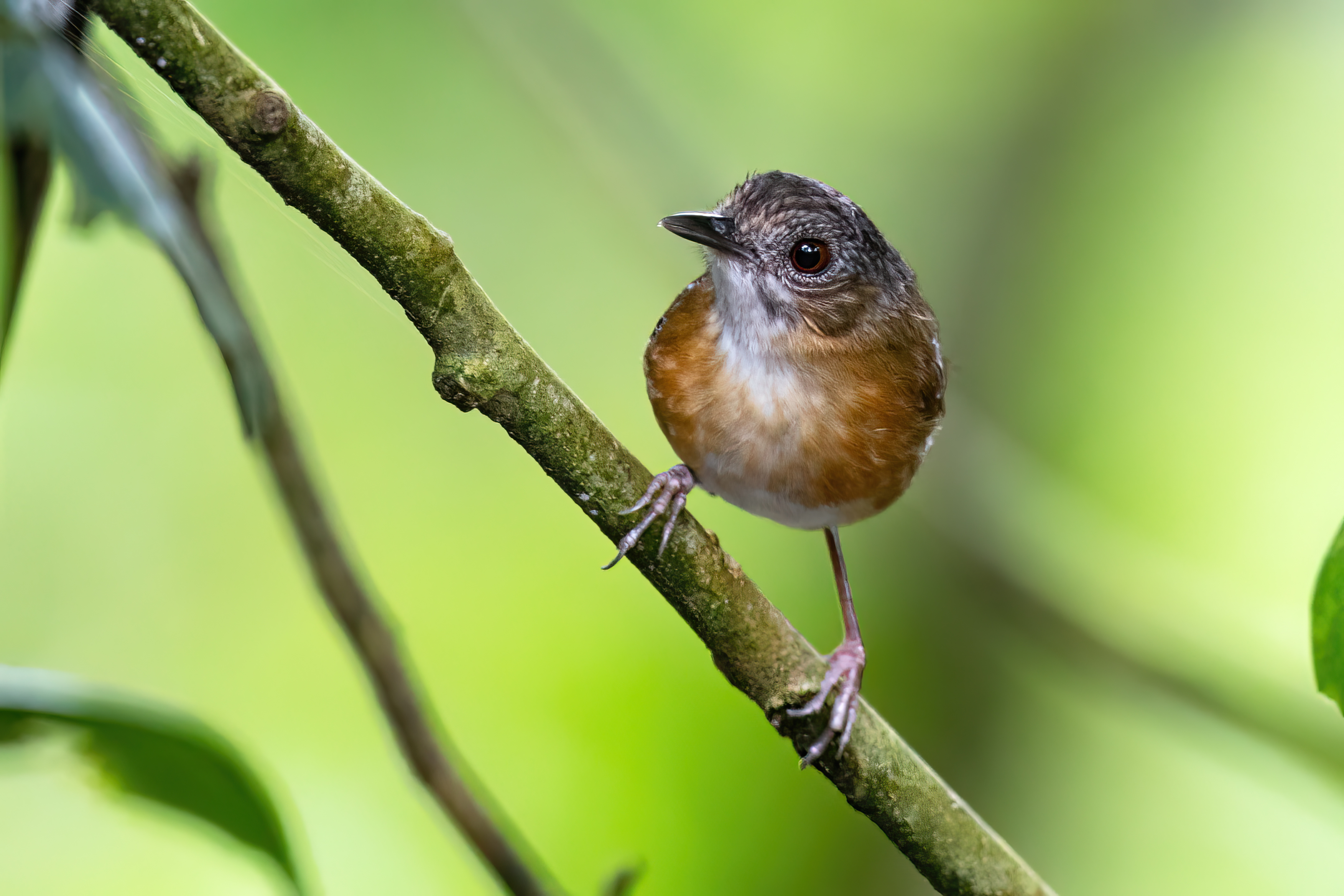
- Temminck's babbler (above)

Conservation status
- Least Concern (IUCN 3.1)

Scientific classification
- Kingdom: Animalia
- Phylum: Chordata
- Class: Aves
- Order: Passeriformes
- Family: Pellorneidae
- Genus: Pellorneum
- Species: P. pyrrogenys

Binomial name
- Pellorneum pyrrogenys (Temminck, 1827)

Synonyms
- Trichastoma pyrrogenys (Temminck, 1827); Malacopteron erythrote

= Temminck's babbler =

Species of bird

Temminck's babbler (Pellorneum pyrrogenys) is a species of bird in the family Pellorneidae. It is found in Borneo and Java. Its natural habitat is subtropical or tropical moist lowland forest.

This bird's common name commemorates the Dutch naturalist Coenraad Jacob Temminck.
