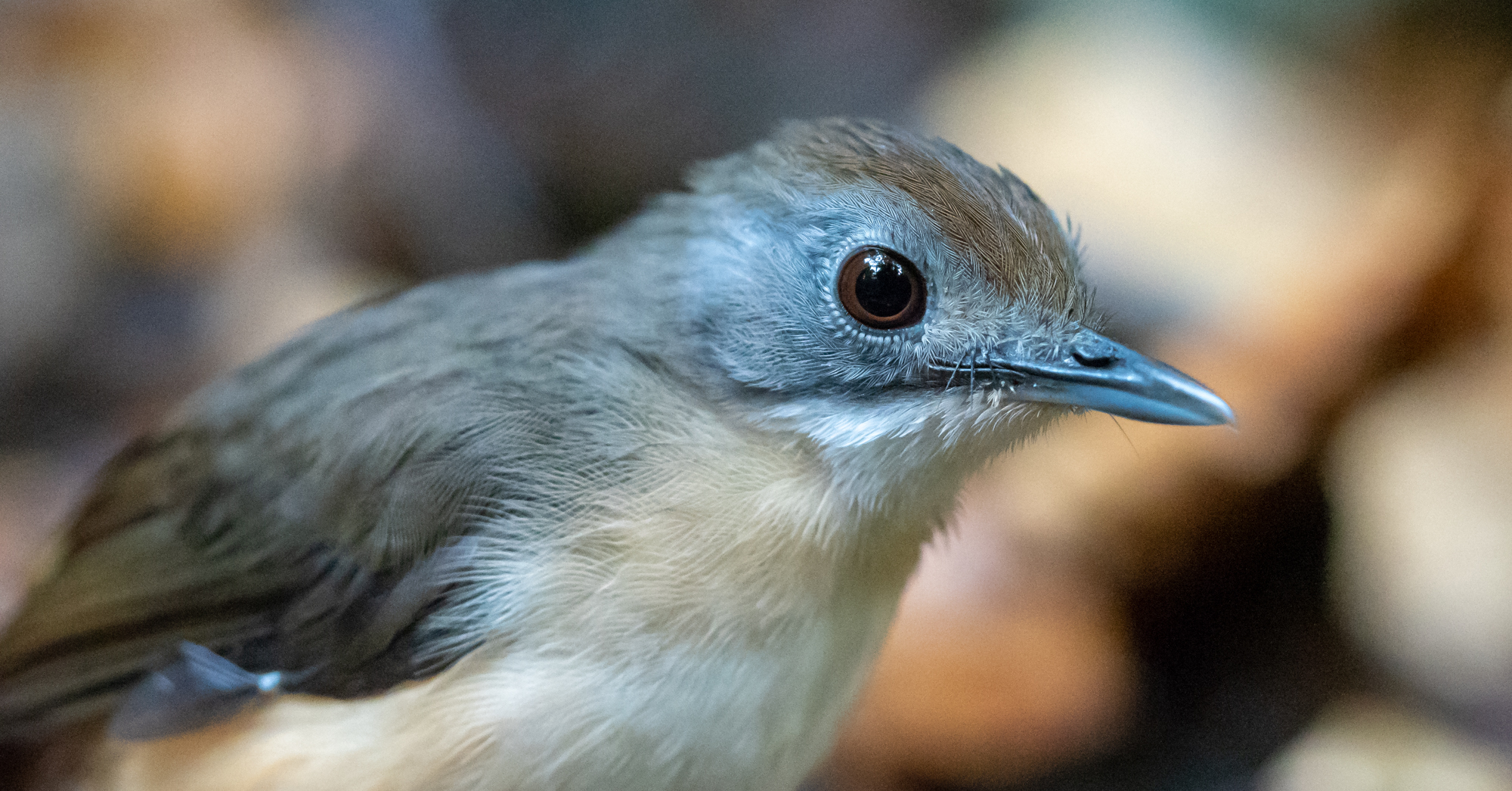

Scientific classification
- Kingdom: Animalia
- Phylum: Chordata
- Class: Aves
- Order: Passeriformes
- Family: Pellorneidae
- Genus: Pellorneum
- Species: P. poliogene

Binomial name
- Pellorneum poliogene (Strickland, 1849)

= Leaflitter babbler =

Species of bird

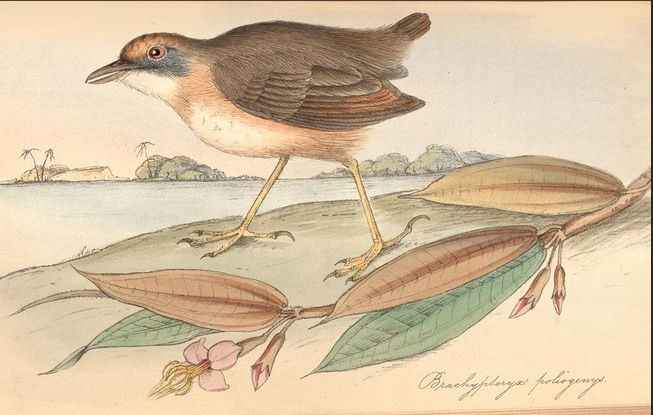
Illustration of the leaflitter babbler from: Strickland, H.E., 1849. Notes on several species of birds from Malacca. Contributions to Ornithology for 1848–1853. Edinburgh: W.H. Lizars. Plate 31

The leaflitter babbler (Pellorneum poliogene) is a species of bird in the ground babbler family Pellorneidae that is found in northern and central Borneo. It was formerly considered to be a subspecies of the short-tailed babbler, now renamed the mourning babbler (Pellorneum malaccense).

== Taxonomy ==
The leaflitter babbler was formally described in 1849 by the English naturalist Hugh Edwin Strickland based on a specimen collected in Borneo. He placed it with the shortwings in the genus Brachypteryx and coined the binomial name Brachypteryx poliogenis. The specific epithet combines the Ancient Greek polios meaning "grey" and genus meaning "cheek". The leaflitter babbler is now placed in the genus Pellorneum that was introduced in 1832 by the English naturalist William Swainson. It was formerly treated as a subspecies of the short-tailed babbler (renamed the mourning babbler) (Pellorneum malaccense) but based on vocal and genetic differences it is now treated as a separate species and is considered to be monotypic: no subspecies are recognised.
