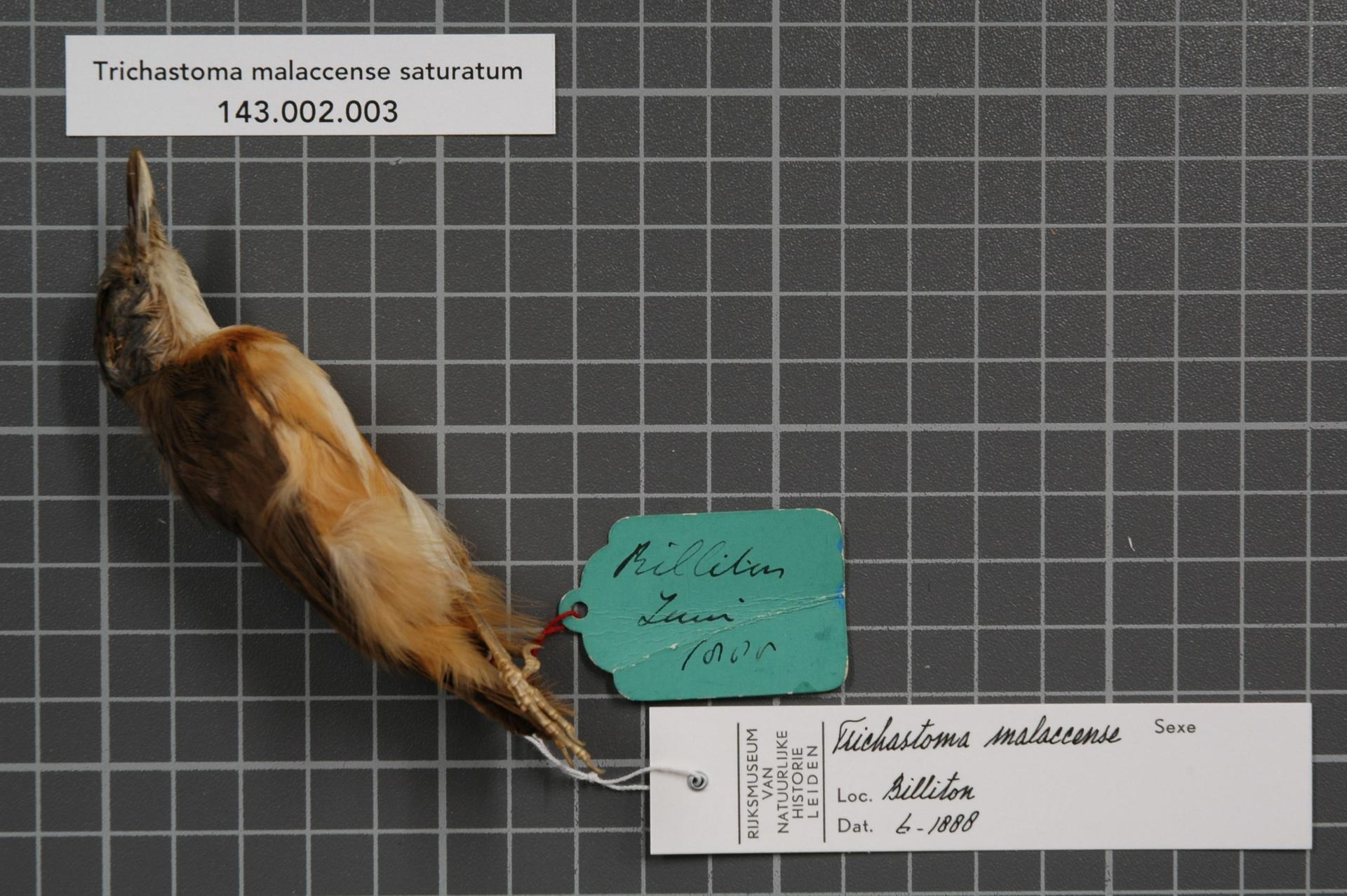

Scientific classification
- Kingdom: Animalia
- Phylum: Chordata
- Class: Aves
- Order: Passeriformes
- Family: Pellorneidae
- Genus: Pellorneum
- Species: P. saturatum

Binomial name
- Pellorneum saturatum (Robinson & Kloss, 1920)

= Glissando babbler =

Species of bird

The glissando babbler (Pellorneum saturatum) is a species of bird in the ground babbler family Pellorneidae. It is found on the Indonesian islands of Bangka and Belitung as well as west and southwest Borneo. It was formerly considered to be a subspecies of the short-tailed babbler, now renamed the mourning babbler (Pellorneum malaccense).

== Taxonomy ==
The glissando babbler was formally described in 1920 by the British zoologists Herbert C. Robinson and C. Boden Kloss based on specimens collected near the Tinjar River, a tributary of the Baram River, in northern Sarawak, Malaysia. They considered it as a subspecies of the short-tailed babbler, now renamed the mourning babbler, and coined the trinomial name Anuropsis malaccensis saturata. The specific epithet is from Latin saturatus meaning "richly coloured". The glissando babbler has been move to the genus Pellorneum that was introduced in 1832 by the English naturalist William Swainson. Based on the vocal and genetic differences it is now treated as a separate species. The species is considered to be monotypic: no subspecies are recognised.
