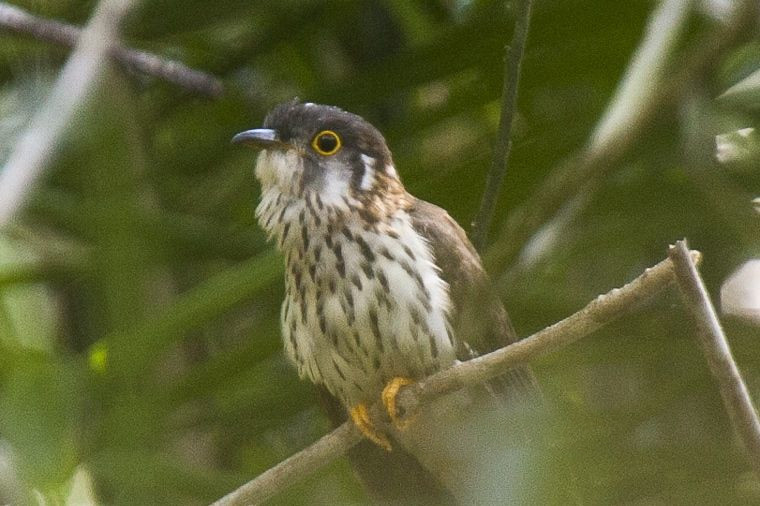

Conservation status
- Near Threatened (IUCN 3.1)

Scientific classification
- Kingdom: Animalia
- Phylum: Chordata
- Class: Aves
- Order: Cuculiformes
- Family: Cuculidae
- Genus: Hierococcyx
- Species: H. vagans

Binomial name
- Hierococcyx vagans (Müller, S, 1845)

Synonyms
- Cuculus vagans S. Müller, 1845

= Moustached hawk-cuckoo =

Species of bird

The moustached hawk-cuckoo (Hierococcyx vagans) is a species of cuckoo in the family Cuculidae. It is found in Brunei, Indonesia, Laos, Malaysia, Myanmar, and Thailand. Its natural habitat is evergreen and secondary forests. Threatened by habitat loss, it has been assessed as a near-threatened species.

== Taxonomy ==
Salomon Müller described the species in 1845, as Cuculus vagans. The species is monotypic.

== Distribution and habitat ==
The moustached hawk-cuckoo is found in southern Myanmar, Thailand, southern Laos, Malaysia, Singapore, Brunei, and Kalimantan, Sumatra and Java of Indonesia. Its habitat is evergreen and secondary forests and forest edges, especially on hills and in alluvial and bamboo forests. It occurs at elevations up to 915 m (3,002 ft).

== Description ==
The moustached hawk-cuckoo is 25–30 cm (9.8–11.8 in) long, and it weighs about 58–63 g (2.0–2.2 oz). The crown and nape are grey. The ear coverts are white, and there is a blackish moustache. The back is brown, and the tail has brown bands and a buffy or white tip. The flight feathers have buffy bars. The underparts are creamy-white, with blackish streaks. The eye is dark brown or grey, with a yellow eye-ring around it. The beak is black, and the feet are orange-yellow. The juvenile bird's back and wings are blackish, and it has black streaks on its breast. The fledgling also has a moustache.

== Behaviour ==
This cuckoo eats insects and small fruits. It has been seen in mixed-species foraging flocks. It is usually found in thick canopy. Males sing at fixed locations in the canopy, its call being chu-chu or kang-koh repeated every two seconds. It also gives a whistling peu peu that becomes hi-hi and then stops. It has been observed parasitising Abbott's babbler and the rufous-winged philentoma. In mainland Southeast Asia, the breeding season is June to August.

== Status ==
The species is threatened by rapid habitat loss caused by logging, land conversion and forest fires. The population is probably declining at a moderately rapid rate because it can live in secondary forests. The International Union for Conservation of Nature (IUCN) has assessed it as a near-threatened species.
