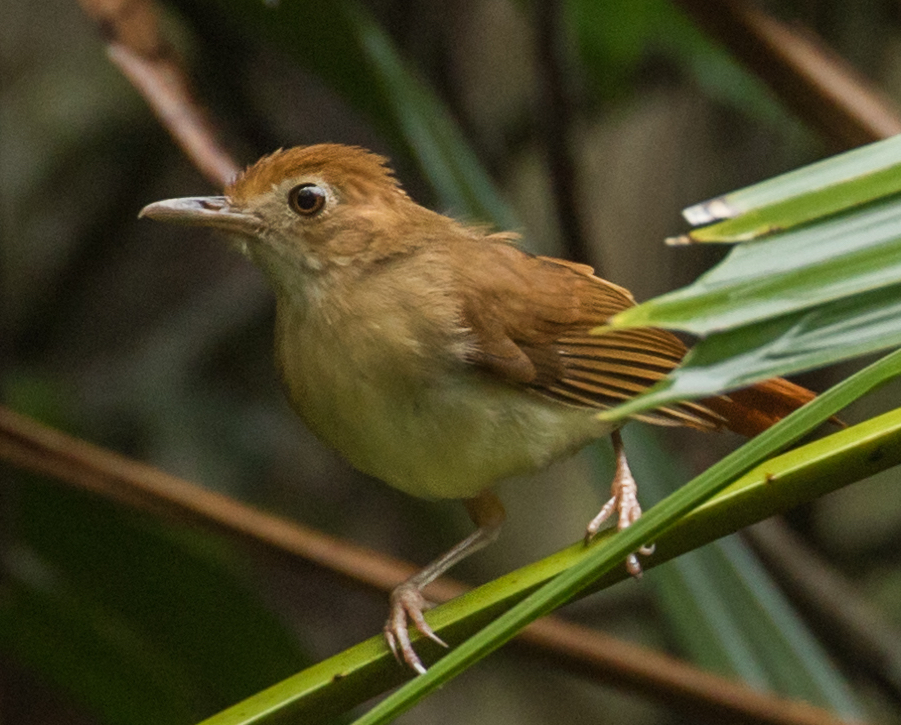

Conservation status
- Least Concern (IUCN 3.1)

Scientific classification
- Kingdom: Animalia
- Phylum: Chordata
- Class: Aves
- Order: Passeriformes
- Family: Pellorneidae
- Genus: Pellorneum
- Species: P. bicolor

Binomial name
- Pellorneum bicolor (Lesson, 1839)

Synonyms
- Trichastoma bicolor

= Ferruginous babbler =

Species of bird

The ferruginous babbler (Pellorneum bicolor) is a species of bird in the family Pellorneidae. It is found in Brunei, Indonesia, Malaysia, Myanmar, and Thailand. Its natural habitat is subtropical or tropical moist lowland forests.
