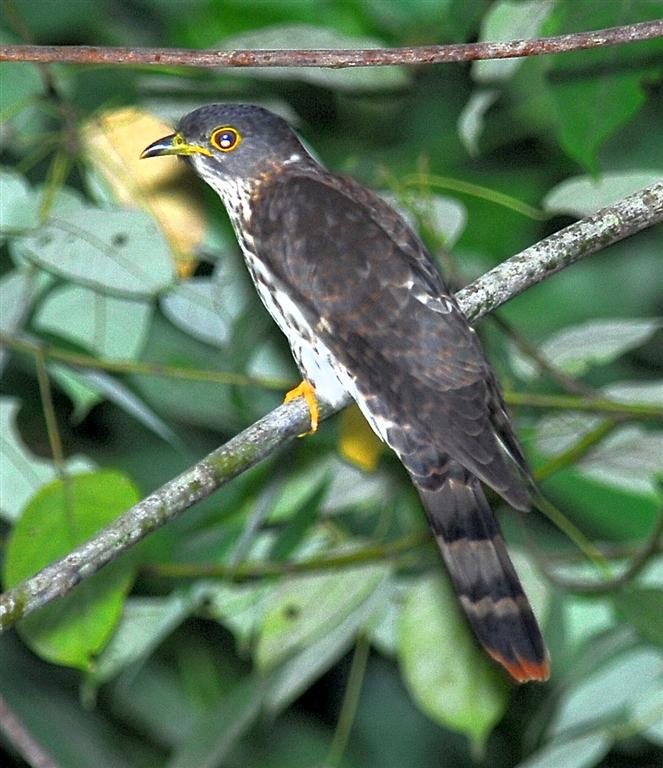

Conservation status
- Least Concern (IUCN 3.1)

Scientific classification
- Kingdom: Animalia
- Phylum: Chordata
- Class: Aves
- Order: Cuculiformes
- Family: Cuculidae
- Genus: Hierococcyx
- Species: H. fugax

Binomial name
- Hierococcyx fugax (Horsfield, 1821)

= Malayan hawk-cuckoo =

Species of bird

The Malayan hawk-cuckoo, Malaysian hawk-cuckoo or Malay hawk-cuckoo (Hierococcyx fugax) is a bird in the family Cuculidae formerly considered conspecific with Hodgson's hawk-cuckoo and the rufous hawk-cuckoo. All three species were previously assigned as Cuculus fugax.

== Geographic range ==
The Malayan hawk-cuckoo is found in far southern Burma, southern Thailand, Malaya, Singapore, Borneo, Sumatra and western Java.

== Habitat ==
The Malayan hawk-cuckoo occurs in a variety of forest types from plains level up to 1700 metres on Sumatra. It can also be found in cocoa and rubber plantations.

== Diet and foraging ==
Insects, mainly caterpillars, but also cicadas, beetles, small butterflies and locusts, in addition fruits and berries. Active in bushes and understorey, gleaning prey from foliage.

== Behaviour ==
Hawk-cuckoos are brood parasites and recorded hosts include the white-rumped shama and the grey-headed canary-flycatcher.
