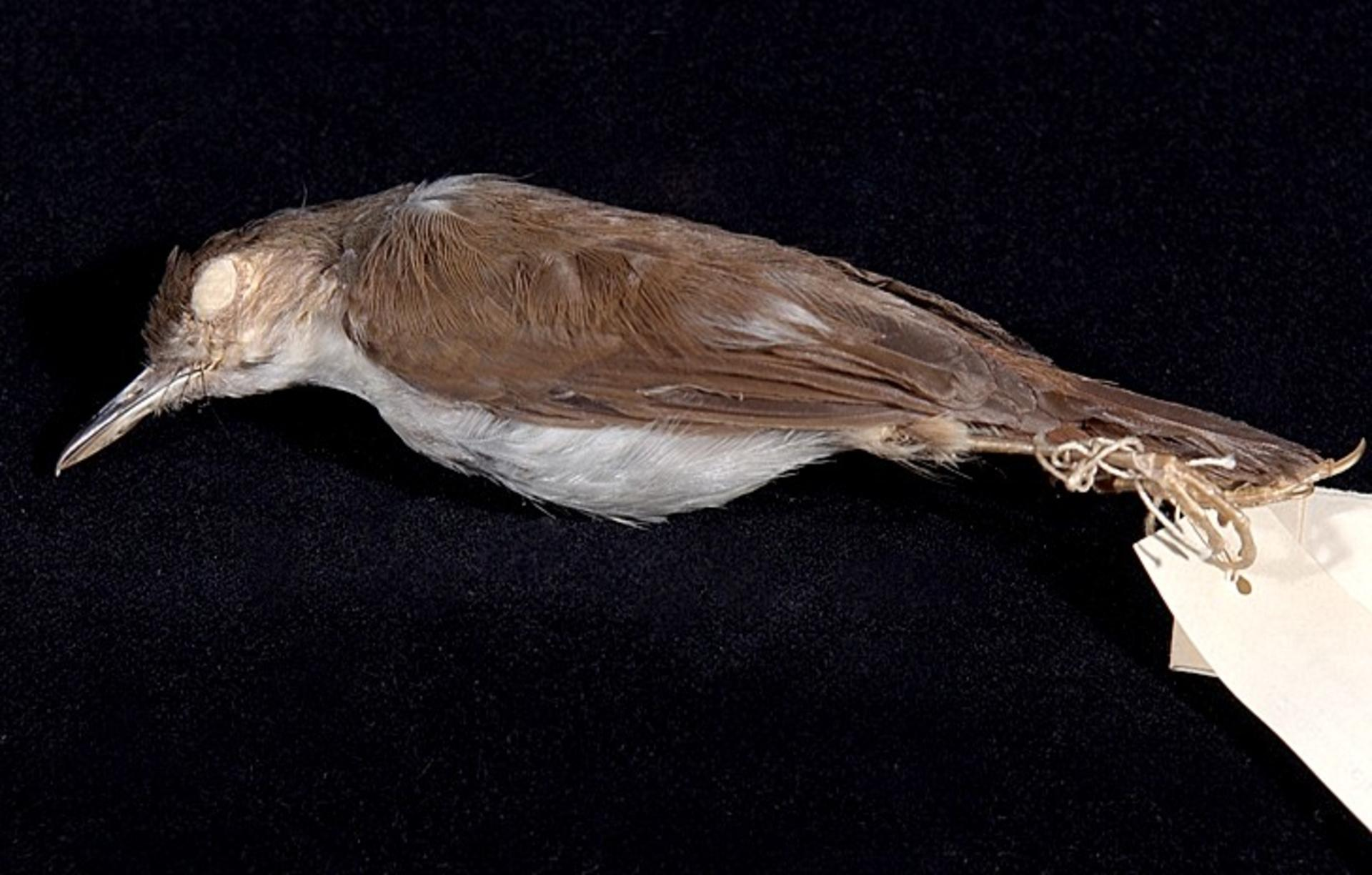

Conservation status
- Near Threatened (IUCN 3.1)

Scientific classification
- Kingdom: Animalia
- Phylum: Chordata
- Class: Aves
- Order: Passeriformes
- Family: Pellorneidae
- Genus: Pellorneum
- Species: P. rostratum

Binomial name
- Pellorneum rostratum (Blyth, 1842)

= Malayan swamp babbler =

Species of bird

The Malayan swamp babbler (Pellorneum rostratum), previously named the white-chested babbler, is a species of bird in the ground babbler family, Pellorneidae, that is found in the Malay Peninsula, Sumatra, the Riau Islands, the Lingga Islands and the island of Belitung. It was formerly considered to be conspecific with the Bornean swamp babbler (Pellorneum macropterum).

Its natural habitats are subtropical or tropical moist lowland forests and subtropical or tropical mangrove forests. It is threatened by habitat loss.
