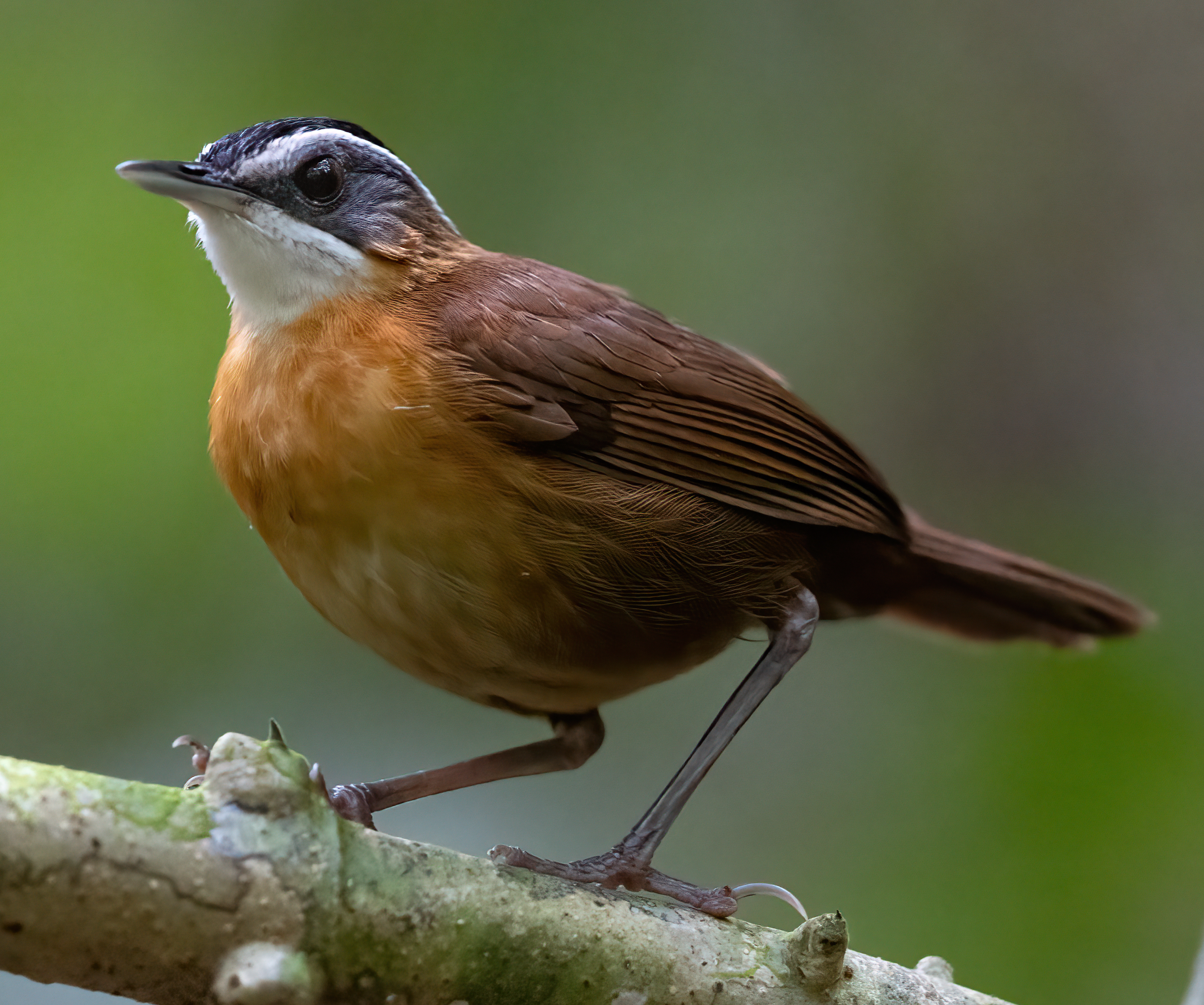

Scientific classification
- Domain: Eukaryota
- Kingdom: Animalia
- Phylum: Chordata
- Class: Aves
- Order: Passeriformes
- Family: Pellorneidae
- Genus: Pellorneum
- Species: P. capistratoides

Binomial name
- Pellorneum capistratoides (Strickland, 1849)

= Bornean black-capped babbler =

Species of bird

The Bornean black-capped babbler (Pellorneum capistratoides) is a species of bird in the family Pellorneidae. It is found on Borneo. This species, the Javan black-capped babbler (P. capistratum) and the Malayan black-capped babbler (P. nigrocapitatum ) were formerly considered conspecific, but were split from it in 2021. Together they were called the black-capped babbler. Its natural habitat is subtropical or tropical moist lowland forest.
