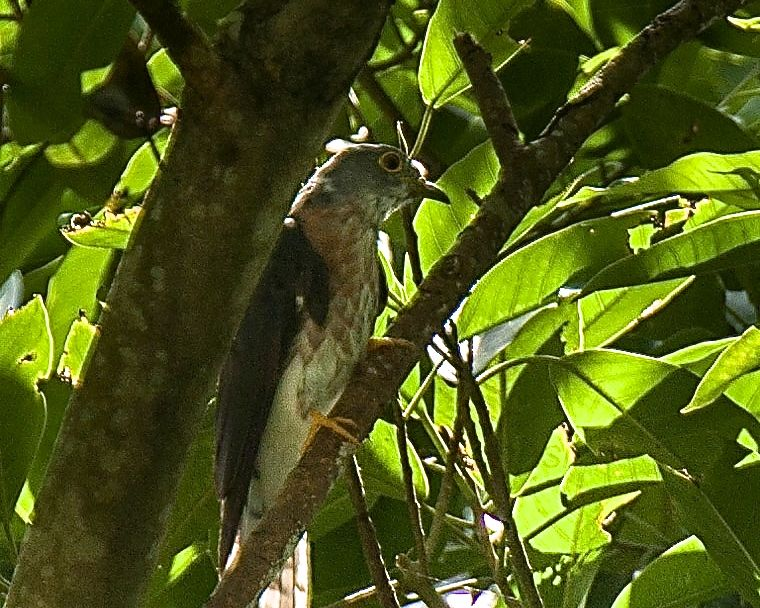

Conservation status
- Least Concern (IUCN 3.1)

Scientific classification
- Kingdom: Animalia
- Phylum: Chordata
- Class: Aves
- Order: Cuculiformes
- Family: Cuculidae
- Genus: Hierococcyx
- Species: H. pectoralis

Binomial name
- Hierococcyx pectoralis Cabanis & Heine, 1863

= Philippine hawk-cuckoo =

Species of bird

The Philippine hawk-cuckoo (Hierococcyx pectoralis) is a bird belonging to the cuckoo family. It is found only in the Philippines. It was formerly classified as a subspecies of Hodgson's hawk-cuckoo but is now its own species.

== Description and taxonomy ==
It is a medium-sized cuckoo, about 29 centimetres in length. The adult is dark-grey above and white below with a pale rufous breast and upper belly. The tail has three or four black and buff bars, a broad black band near the tip and a pale rufous tip. There is a bare yellow ring around the eye. The legs and feet are also yellow and the bill is black and olive. Immature birds have rufous barring above and brown streaks below.

The bird has a high-pitched call of five to seven notes. The call lasts for about 1.5 seconds and is repeated up to 10 times, becoming louder and faster.

It was formerly classified as a subspecies of Hodgson's hawk-cuckoo (H. fugax) but is now commonly treated as a separate species based on differences in vocalizations.

This species is monotypic.

== Ecology and behavior ==
It is an insectivore, primarily feeding on caterpillars but also feeds on fruits and berries.

There is not much information about its breeding habits and nesting. Its breeding season begins in April. Like most cuckoos, it is a brood parasite but host species are unknown.

== Habitat and conservation status ==
It is found on most of the larger islands of the Philippines, occurring up to 2,300 metres above sea-level. It inhabits forest and forest edge where it forages from near the ground up to the treetops. It is an uncommon bird and is usually shy and difficult to see.

The IUCN Red List has assessed this bird as Least-concern species with the population decreasing. Extensive lowland deforestation on all islands in its range is the main threat. Most remaining lowland forest that is not afforded protection leaving it vulnerable to both legal and Illegal logging, conversion into farmlands through Slash-and-burn and mining.

Occurs in a few protected areas in Northern Sierra Madre Natural Park and Bataan National Park on Luzon, Pasonanca Natural Park in Mindanao, Rajah Sikatuna Protected Landscape in Bohol and Samar Island Natural Park but actual protection and enforcement from illegal logging and hunting are lax.
