= Bock's hawk-cuckoo =

Conservation status
- Least Concern (IUCN 3.1)

Scientific classification
- Kingdom: Animalia
- Phylum: Chordata
- Class: Aves
- Order: Cuculiformes
- Family: Cuculidae
- Genus: Hierococcyx
- Species: H. bocki

Binomial name
- Hierococcyx bocki Wardlaw-Ramsay, 1886

Species of bird

Bock's hawk-cuckoo or the dark hawk-cuckoo (Hierococcyx bocki) is a bird in the family Cuculidae formerly considered conspecific with the large hawk-cuckoo (Hierococcyx sparverioides) and placed in the genus Cuculus.

== Geographic Range ==
In Malaysia it occurs in upper Malaya. In Indonesia it is found on Sumatra.
