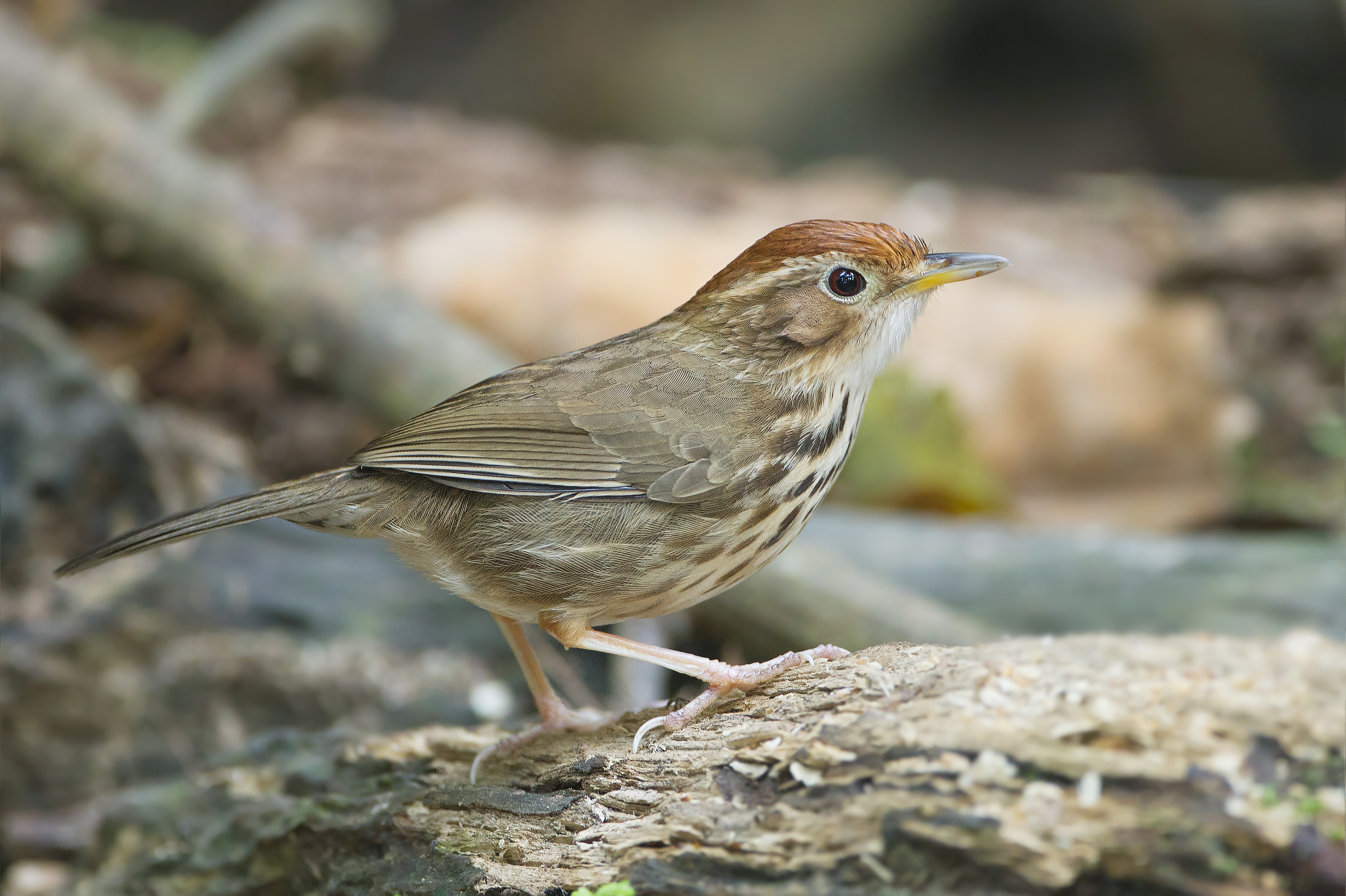
- Pellorneum ruficeps dusiti (Khao Yai National Park, Thailand)

Conservation status
- Least Concern (IUCN 3.1)

Scientific classification
- Kingdom: Animalia
- Phylum: Chordata
- Class: Aves
- Order: Passeriformes
- Family: Pellorneidae
- Genus: Pellorneum
- Species: P. ruficeps

Binomial name
- Pellorneum ruficeps Swainson, 1832

Audio
- Calls (nominate race from India)

= Puff-throated babbler =

Species of bird

The puff-throated babbler or spotted babbler (Pellorneum ruficeps) is a species of passerine bird found in Asia. They are found in scrub and moist forest mainly in hilly regions. They forage in small groups on the forest floor, turning around leaf litter to find their prey and usually staying low in the undergrowth where they can be hard to spot. However, they have loud and distinct calls, including a morning song, contact and alarm calls. It is the type species of the genus Pellorneum which may, however, currently include multiple lineages.

== Description ==
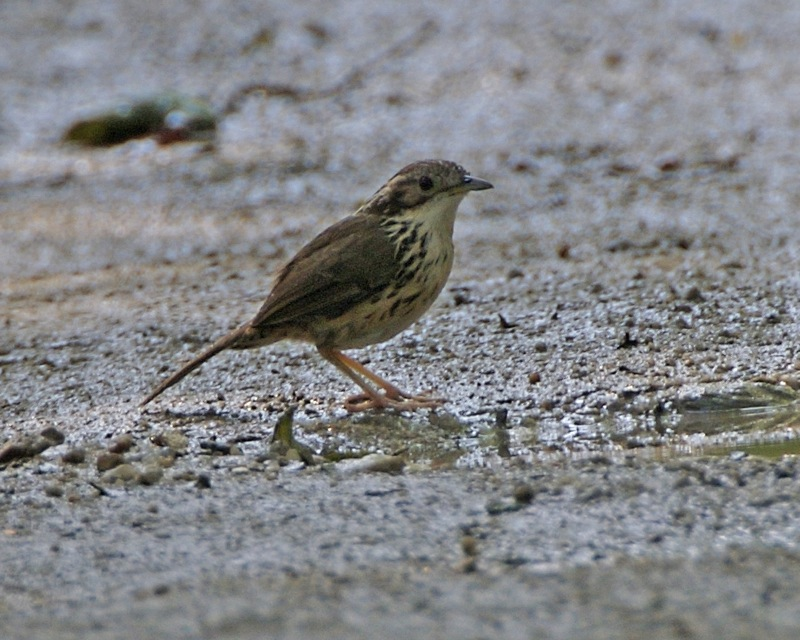
Adult in Kaziranga National Park, possibly of ssp. mandelli

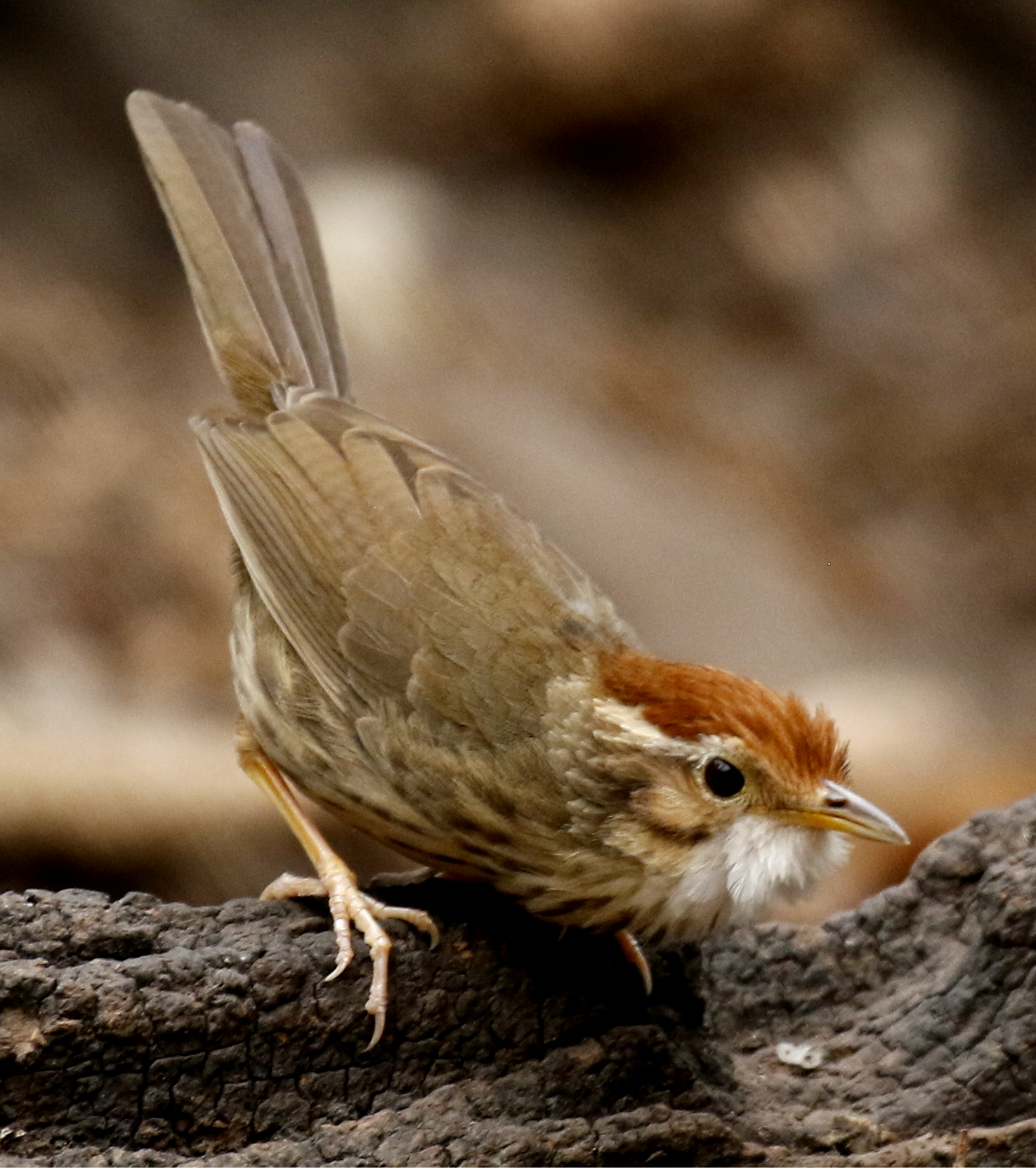
Near Kaeng Krachen Nat'l Park' - Thailand

Puff-throated babblers are brown above, and white below with heavily brown streaks towards the breast and belly. They have a chestnut crown, long buff supercilium and dusky cheeks. The throat is white, and is sometimes puffed out giving it the English name. Puff-throated babblers have strong legs, and spend a lot of time on the forest floor. They can often be seen creeping through undergrowth in search of their insect food, looking at first glance like a song thrush. Some subspecies have streaks on the mantle while others, especially in Peninsular India, are unstreaked.

The widespread distribution with population variations has led to nearly thirty subspecies being described. The nominate population is found in peninsular India (excluding the Western Ghats). The population in the northern Eastern Ghats is paler and has been called pallidum while a well-marked dark form occurs in the southern Western Ghats, which has been named granti (includes olivaceum). The western Himalayas population is punctatum (includes jonesi) and in the east is mandellii, which has streaking on the back and nape as well as having call differences. In the east of India, south of the Brahmaputra River occurs chamelum while ripley is found in a small region in eastern Assam (Margherita). Further east in Manipur is vocale and pectorale in Arunachal Pradesh and northern Burma with stageri further south, followed by hilarum, victoriae and minus. Further east are found shanense, subochraceum, insularum, indistinctum, chtonium, elbeli, acrum, oreum, dusiti, vividum, ubonense, euroum, deignani, dilloni and smithi. Several others have been described and many populations are difficult to assign to subspecies. This is the type species for the genus Pellorneum and its generic placement is assured, although other species currently included in the genus may be reassigned.

== Distribution and habitat ==
Calls recorded in Nagerhole

This bird is a common resident breeder in the Himalayas and the forests of Asia. Like most babblers, it is not migratory, and has short rounded wings and a weak flight. Its habitat is scrub and bamboo thickets and it forages by turning over leaves to find insects.

== Behaviour and ecology ==
Puff-throated babblers vocalize often. Their calls are a series of whistling notes ascending in scale. Some calls have been transcribed as he'll beat you, pret-ty-sweet. The calling can be persistent. The breeding season is mainly during the rainy season. They build a nest on the ground at the base of a bush. The nest is dome-shaped and constructed of leaves and twigs with an entrance on the side. The opening usually points downhill when the nest is on sloping ground. The clutch varies from 2 to 5 eggs, with northern populations tending towards larger clutches. Parent birds run rodent-like in the undergrowth as they move in and out of the nest. Young birds fledge and leave the nest about 12 to 13 days after hatching.
