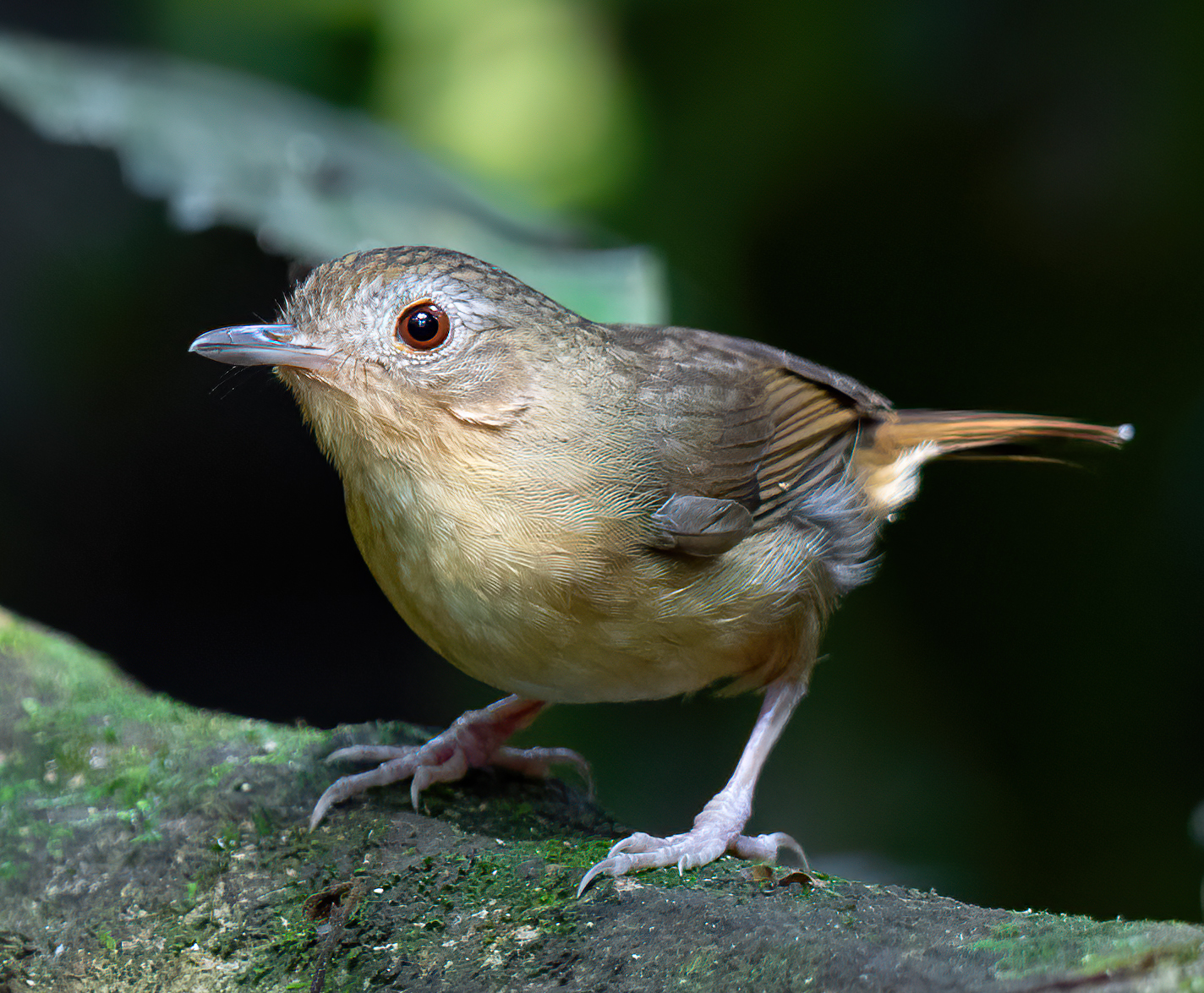

Conservation status
- Least Concern (IUCN 3.1)

Scientific classification
- Kingdom: Animalia
- Phylum: Chordata
- Class: Aves
- Order: Passeriformes
- Family: Pellorneidae
- Genus: Pellorneum
- Species: P. tickelli

Binomial name
- Pellorneum tickelli Blyth, 1859

Synonyms
- Trichastoma tickelli Blyth, 1859

= Buff-breasted babbler =

Species of bird

The buff-breasted babbler (Pellorneum tickelli) is a species of bird in the family Pellorneidae. It is found in Bangladesh, Cambodia, China, India, Laos, Malaysia, Myanmar, Thailand, and Vietnam. Its natural habitats are subtropical or tropical moist lowland forest and subtropical or tropical moist montane forest.
