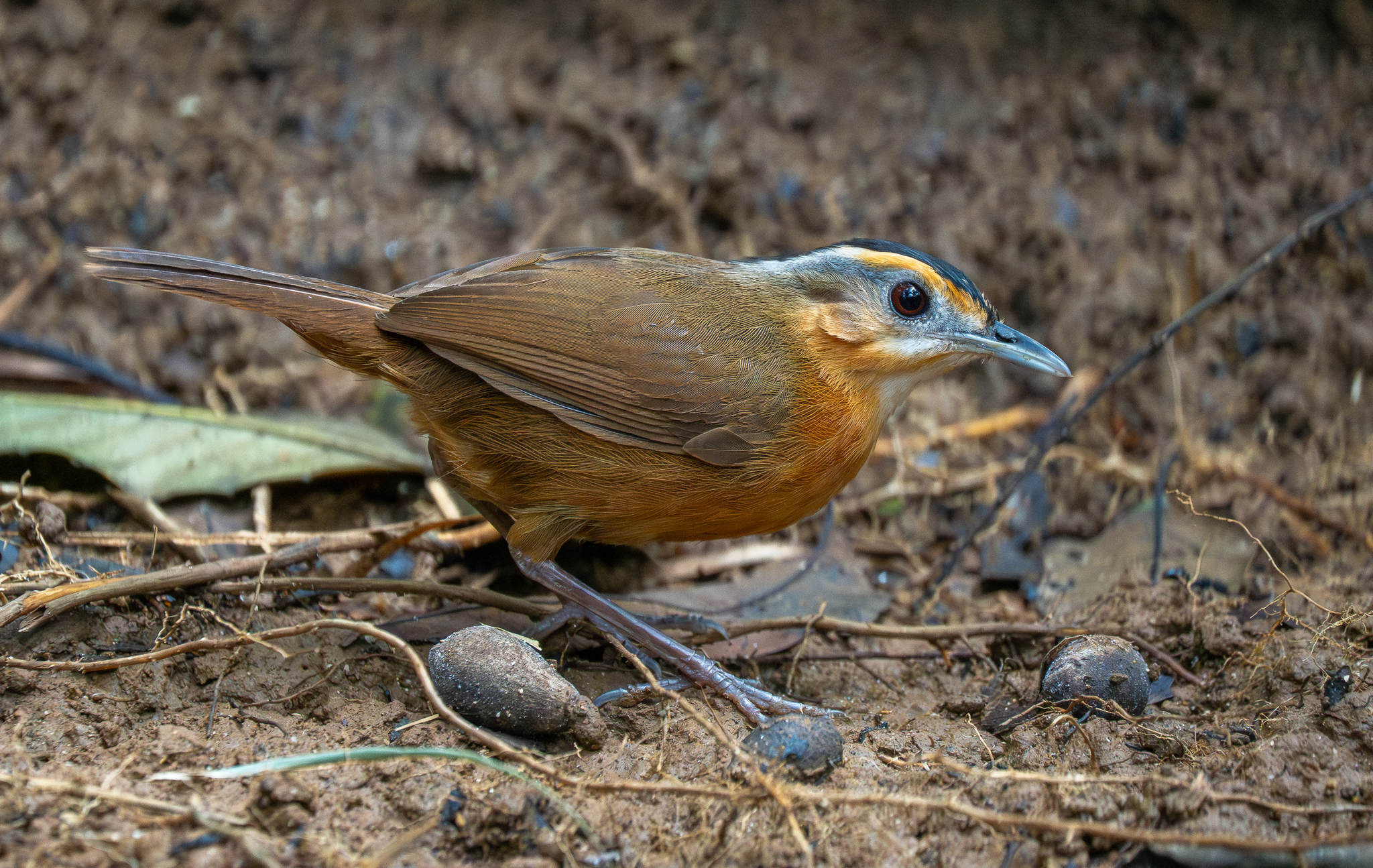

Conservation status
- Least Concern (IUCN 3.1)

Scientific classification
- Kingdom: Animalia
- Phylum: Chordata
- Class: Aves
- Order: Passeriformes
- Family: Pellorneidae
- Genus: Pellorneum
- Species: P. capistratum

Binomial name
- Pellorneum capistratum (Temminck, 1823)

= Javan black-capped babbler =

Species of bird

The Javan black-capped babbler (Pellorneum capistratum) is a species of bird in the family Pellorneidae. It is endemic to the island of Java in Indonesia. The Malayan black-capped babbler (P. nigrocapitatum) and the Bornean black-capped babbler (P. capistratoides) were both formerly considered conspecific, but were split from it in 2021. Its natural habitat is subtropical or tropical moist lowland forest.

== Diet ==
It forages in the understory of forests.

== Behavior ==
It is sedentary.

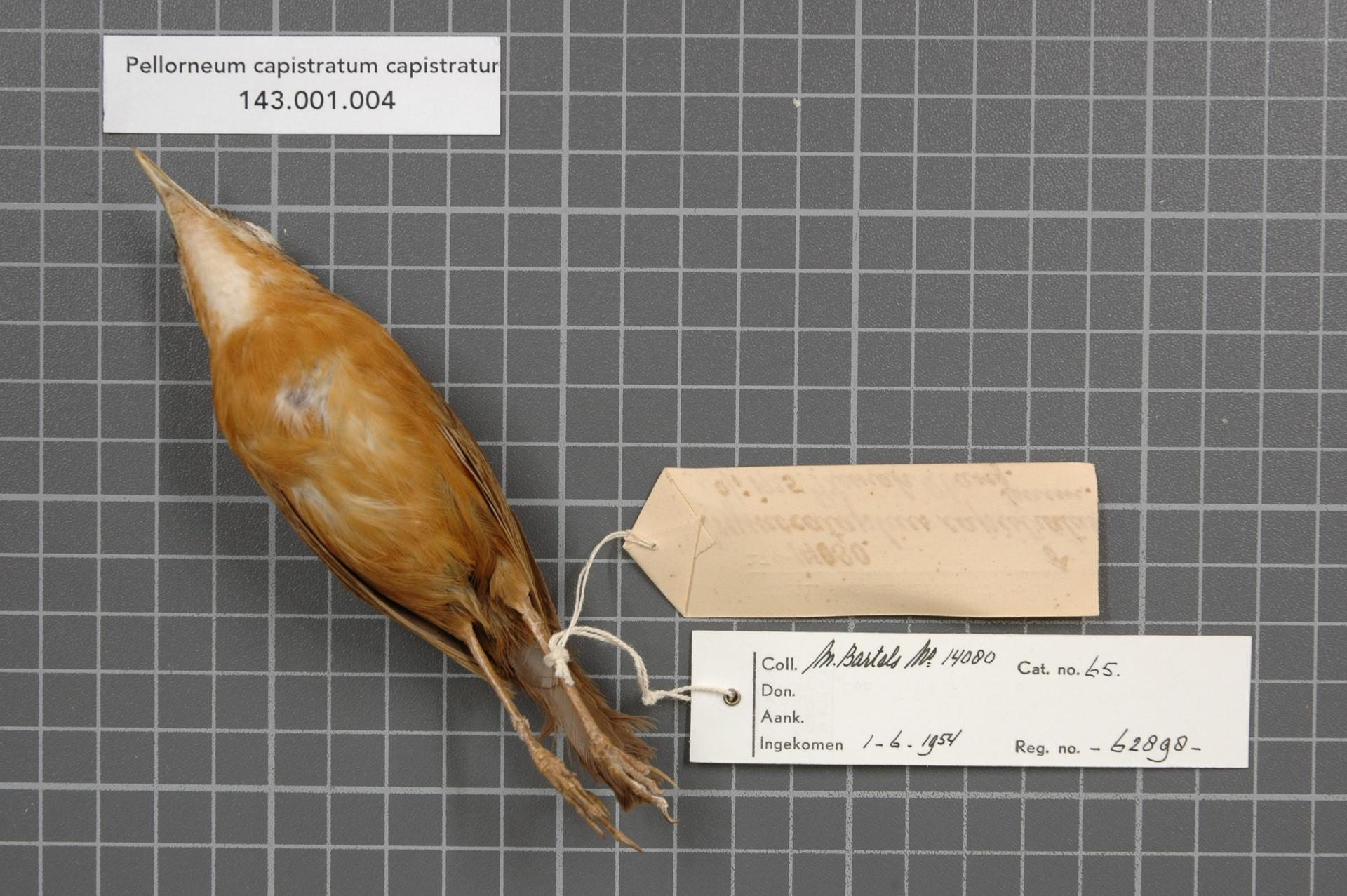
P. capistratum specimen, Collection Naturalis Biodiversity Center
