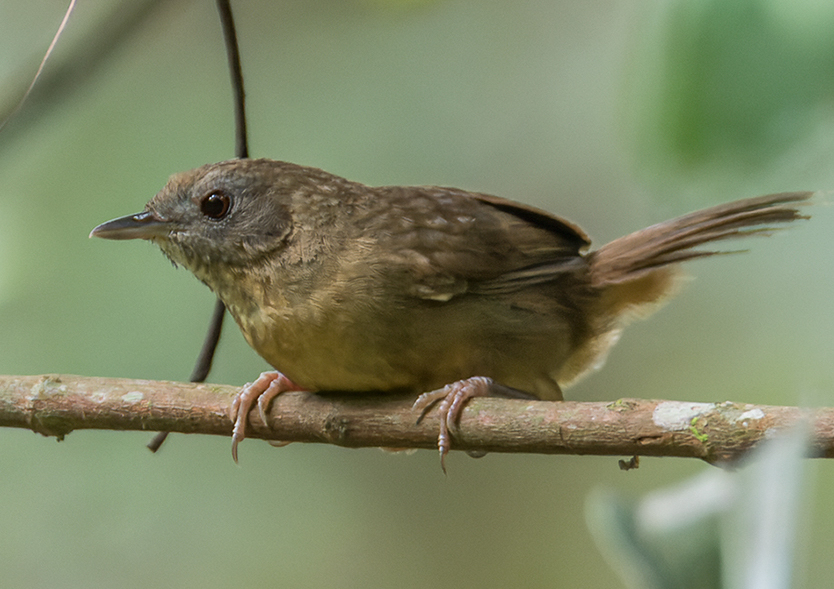
- ssp. cinnamomeum from Doi Inthanon National Park, Thailand

Conservation status
- Least Concern (IUCN 3.1)

Scientific classification
- Kingdom: Animalia
- Phylum: Chordata
- Class: Aves
- Order: Passeriformes
- Family: Pellorneidae
- Genus: Pellorneum
- Species: P. albiventre

Binomial name
- Pellorneum albiventre (Godwin-Austen, 1877)

= Spot-throated babbler =

Species of bird

The spot-throated babbler (Pellorneum albiventre) is a species of bird in the family Pellorneidae. It is found mainly in Eastern Bangladesh, Bhutan, Northeast India, Yunnan, Myanmar and Vietnam.

Its natural habitats are subtropical or tropical moist lowland forest and subtropical or tropical moist montane forest.
