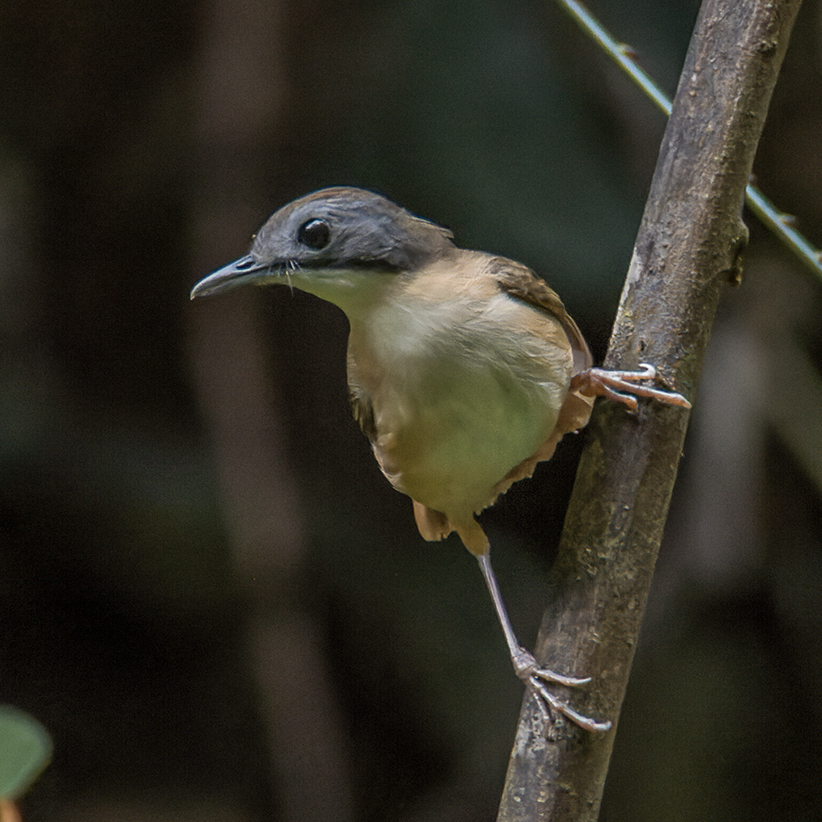

Conservation status
- Near Threatened (IUCN 3.1)

Scientific classification
- Kingdom: Animalia
- Phylum: Chordata
- Class: Aves
- Order: Passeriformes
- Family: Pellorneidae
- Genus: Pellorneum
- Species: P. malaccense

Binomial name
- Pellorneum malaccense (Hartlaub, 1844)

= Mourning babbler =

Species of bird

The mourning babbler (Pellorneum malaccense), previously the short-tailed babbler, is a species of bird in the ground babbler family Pellorneidae. It is found in the Malay Peninsula, Anambas Islands, Sumatra, Banyak Islands, Batu Islands, Riau Islands, Lingga Islands and the Natuna Islands. It was formerly considered to be conspecific with the glissando babbler (Pellorneum saturatum) and the leaflitter babbler (Pellorneum poliogene).

Its natural habitat is tropical moist lowland forests. The species is generally solitary, not joining larger mixed-species flocks, instead foraging as singles or pairs. They forage in the understory on the ground on a variety of insects including beetles, grasshoppers, and ants. Like other babblers they will use their foot to grasp food items, an unusual behaviour for passerine birds.

The mourning babbler is locally common at a number of places within its range but is considered near-threatened due to the loss of lowland forest in its range.

== Taxonomy ==
The mourning babbler was formally described in 1844 by the German ornithologist Gustav Hartlaub. He placed it with the shortwings in the genus Brachypteryx and coined the binomial name Brachypteryx malaccesis. He specified the type locality as Malacca in Malaysia. The species is placed in the genus Pellorneum that was introduced in 1832 by the English naturalist William Swainson. The glissando babbler (Pellorneum saturatum) and the leaflitter babbler (Pellorneum poliogene) were formerly considered to be subspecies but are now treated as separate species based on their significant vocal and genetic differences. The mourning babbler is considered to be monotypic: no subspecies are recognised.
