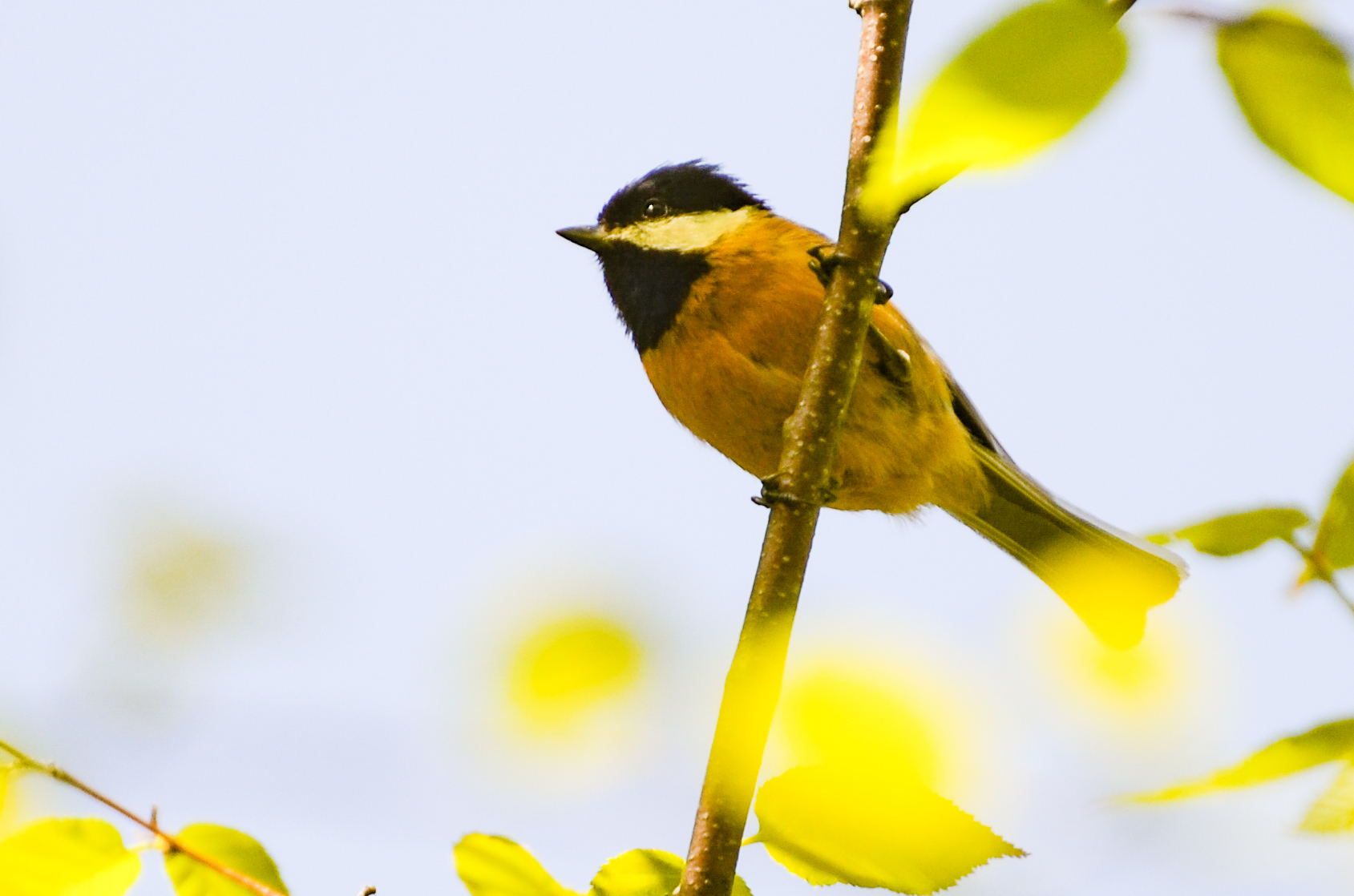

Conservation status
- Least Concern (IUCN 3.1)

Scientific classification
- Kingdom: Animalia
- Phylum: Chordata
- Class: Aves
- Order: Passeriformes
- Family: Paridae
- Genus: Poecile
- Species: P. davidi

Binomial name
- Poecile davidi Berezowski & Bianchi, 1891
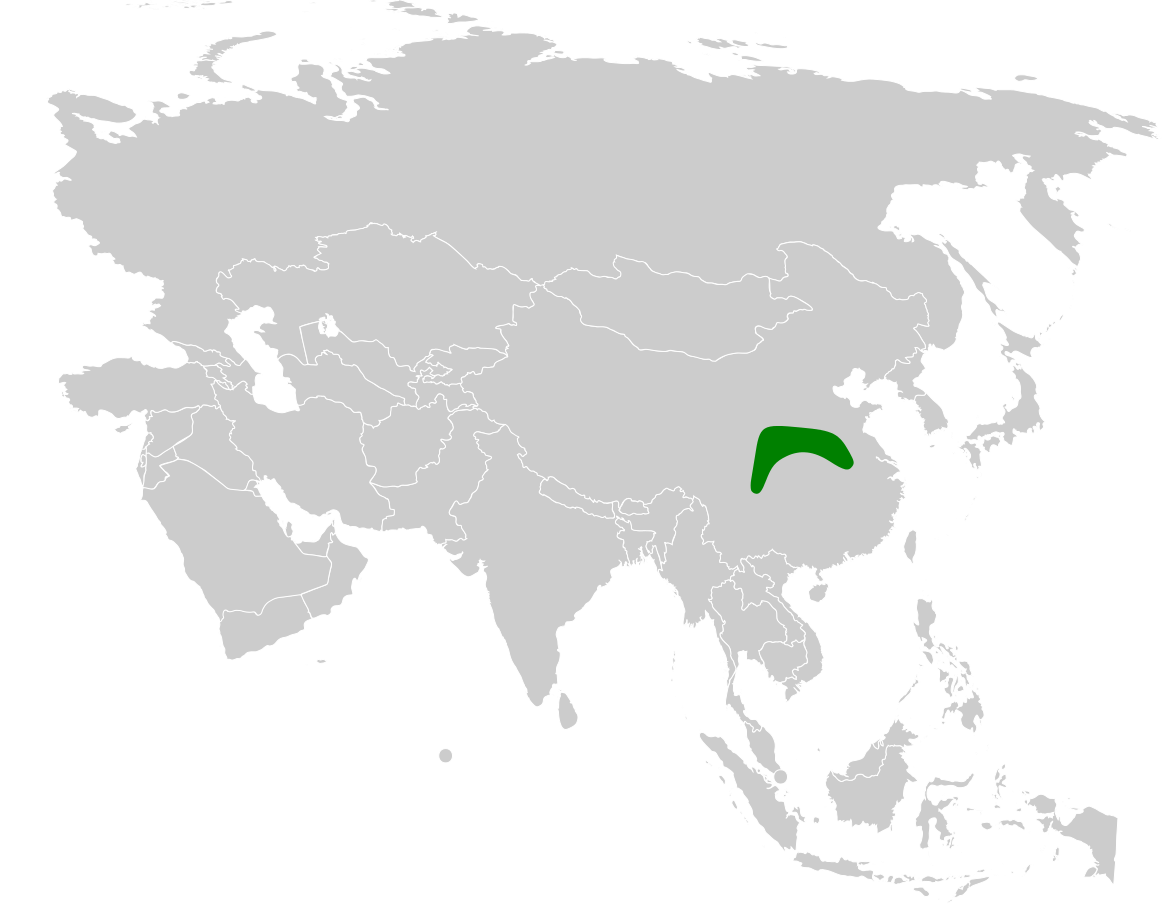
- Range of Poecile davidi

Synonyms
- Parus davidi

= Père David's tit =

Species of bird

Père David's tit or the rusty-breasted tit (Poecile davidi) is a species of bird in the tit family Paridae. It is endemic to central China in southern Gansu, western Hubei, southern Shaanxi and Sichuan.

It is 12–13 centimetres (4.7–5.1 in) long with a weight of 10–12.5 grams (0.35–0.44 oz), and is similar to the related sombre tit (P. lugubris) in appearance, with a black head with white cheeks, dark grey-brown back, wings and tail, and rusty brown underparts.

Its natural breeding habitat is subalpine forests at 2,135–3,400 m altitude, mostly resident but higher altitude birds descending a little in winter to below 3,050 metres (10,010 ft).
