= Grey-headed chickadee =

- Poecile cinctus lapponicus, Sodankylä, Finland

Conservation status
- Least Concern (IUCN 3.1)

Scientific classification
- Kingdom: Animalia
- Phylum: Chordata
- Class: Aves
- Order: Passeriformes
- Family: Paridae
- Genus: Poecile
- Species: P. cinctus

Binomial name
- Poecile cinctus (Boddaert, 1783)
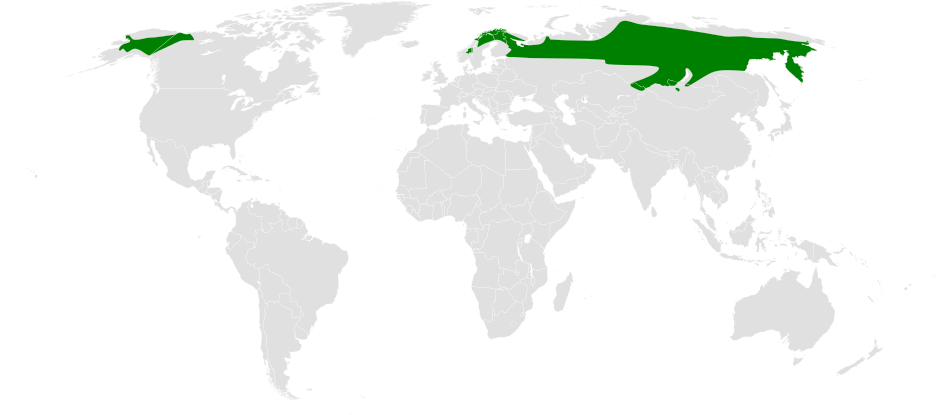
- Range of Poecile cinctus

Synonyms
- Parus cinctus Poecile cincta

Species of bird

The grey-headed chickadee or Siberian tit (Poecile cinctus) is a passerine bird in the tit family Paridae. It is a widespread resident breeder throughout subarctic Scandinavia and the northern Palearctic, and also into North America in Alaska and the far northwest of Canada. It is a conifer specialist. It is resident, and most birds do not migrate.

It is a fairly large tit, at 12.5–14 cm long and with a weight of 11–14.3 g intermediate between willow tit and great tit. The head is dark brown (darkest on the throat and eyestripe, the crown slightly paler) with white cheeks, the mantle cinnamon-brown, the wing feathers blackish with pale fringes, and the underparts whitish with pale rusty-brown flanks.

== Taxonomy ==
The grey-headed chickadee was described by the French polymath Georges-Louis Leclerc, Comte de Buffon in 1779 in his Histoire Naturelle des Oiseaux from a specimen collected in Siberia. The bird was also illustrated in a hand-coloured plate engraved by François-Nicolas Martinet in the Planches Enluminées D'Histoire Naturelle which was produced under the supervision of Edme-Louis Daubenton to accompany Buffon's text. Neither the plate caption nor Buffon's description included a scientific name but in 1783 the Dutch naturalist Pieter Boddaert coined the binomial name Parus cinctus in his catalogue of the Planches Enluminées. The grey-headed chickadee is now one of 15 species placed in the genus Poecile that was introduced by the German naturalist Johann Jakob Kaup in 1829. The genus name is from Ancient Greek poikilos "colourful". A related word poikilidos denoted an unidentified small bird. The specific epithet cinctus is Latin for "banded".

Formerly, the grey-headed chickadee was placed in the genus Parus with most other tits, but mtDNA cytochrome b sequence data and morphology suggest that separating Poecile more adequately expresses these birds' relationships.

Four subspecies are recognised:

- P. c. lapponicus (Lundahl, 1848) – Scandinavia to north European Russia
- P. c. cinctus (Boddaert, 1783) – northeast European Russia through Siberia to Kamchatka and north central Mongolia
- P. c. sayanus Sushkin, 1904 – south Siberia and northwest Mongolia
- P. c. lathami (Stephens, 1817) – north and west Alaska and northwest Canada

== Conservation ==
The North American subspecies P. c. lathami may now be extinct, with no sightings since 2018 anywhere in its range, despite dedicated searches.

The western subspecies P. c. lapponicus is also in serious decline in the west of its range, with the isolated population in southern Norway close to extinction, and major declines in Finland. Ecologists in Folldal, Hedmark, Norway found that the Siberian tits accounted for only 1% of all tit individuals in lichen-dominated pine forest in 2011, as opposed to 64% in 1982. This dramatic reduction is attributed to the interspecies competition with willow tits and great tits, decreased vegetation due to climate change, and logging of old-growth trees which are preferred over new-growth trees. Logging of old-growth forest is thought to be the main cause of the decline in Finland.

== Gallery ==
Poecile cinctus cinctus, Gatsuurt, Mongolia

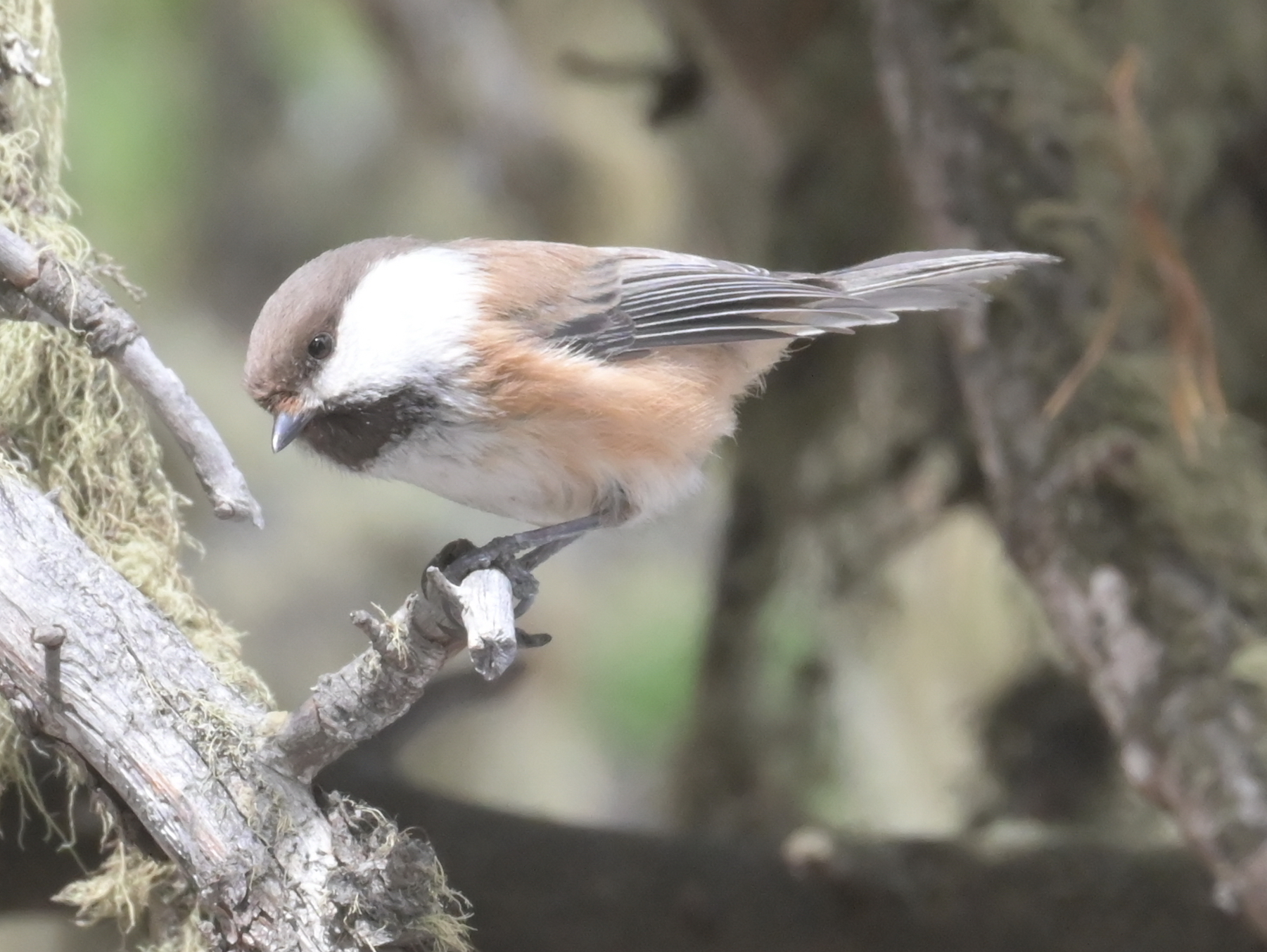
Poecile cinctus sayanus, Myiuta, Altai Republic, Russia

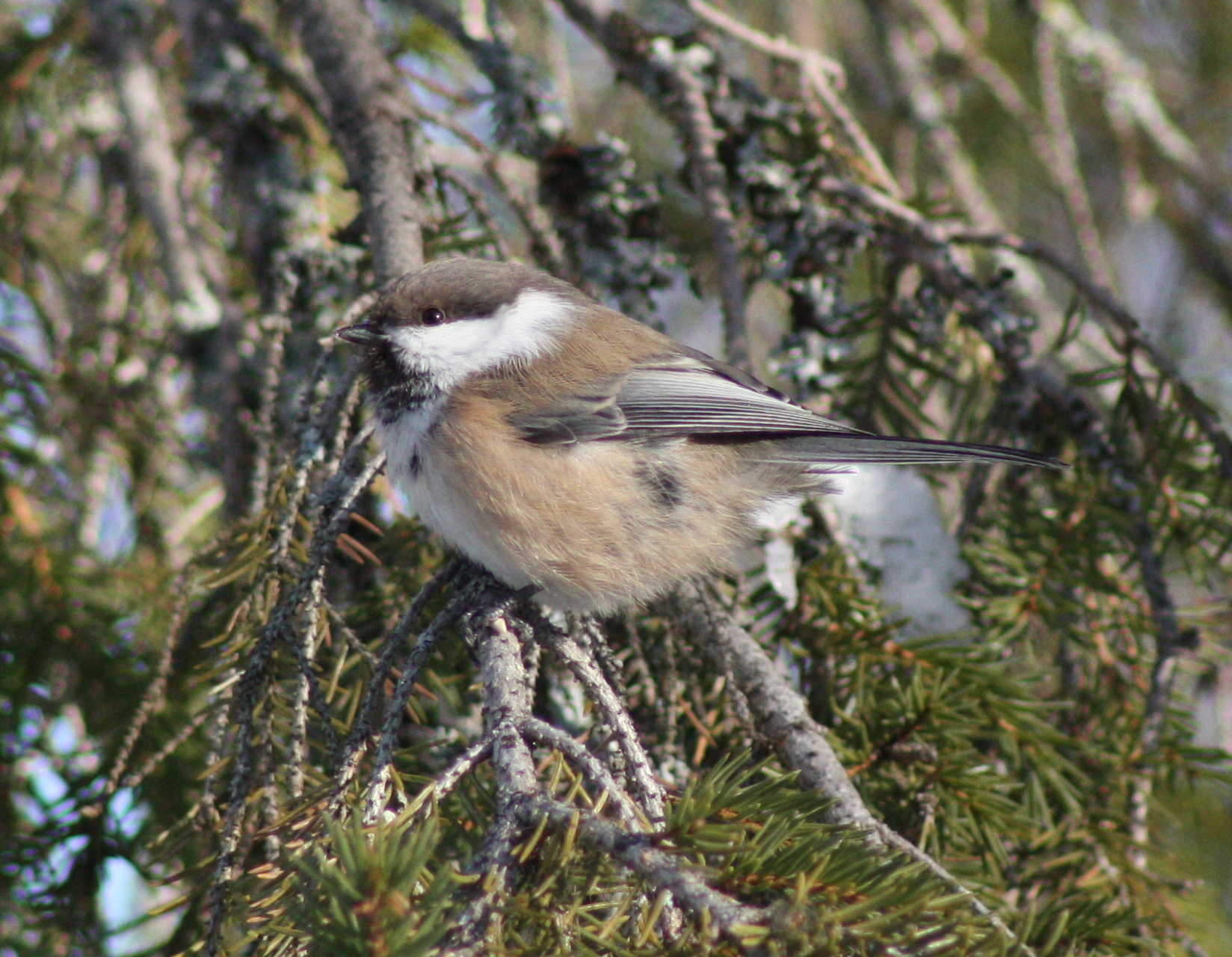
Poecile cinctus lapponicus, Kittila, Finland

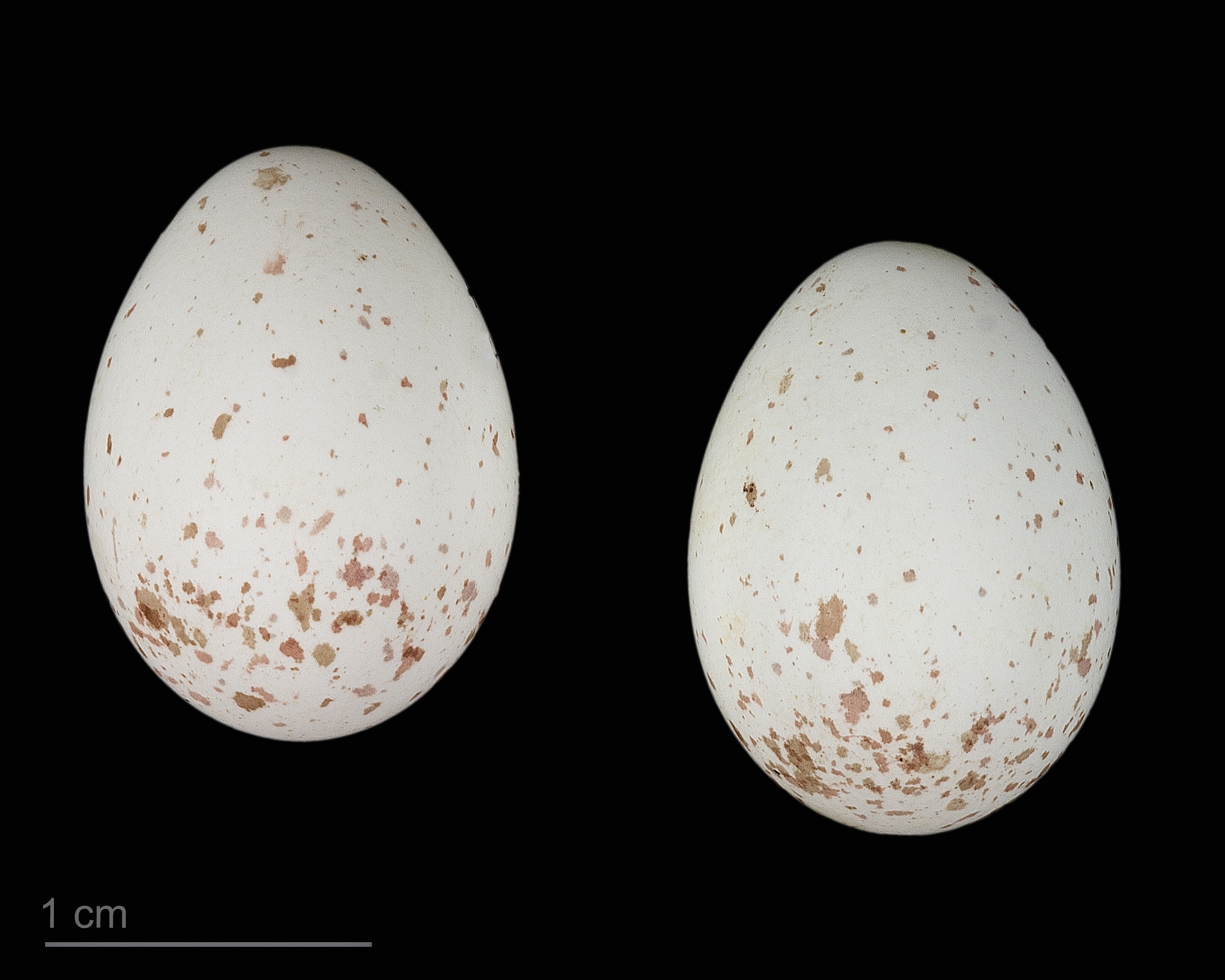
Poecile cinctus lapponicus eggs (Muséum de Toulouse)

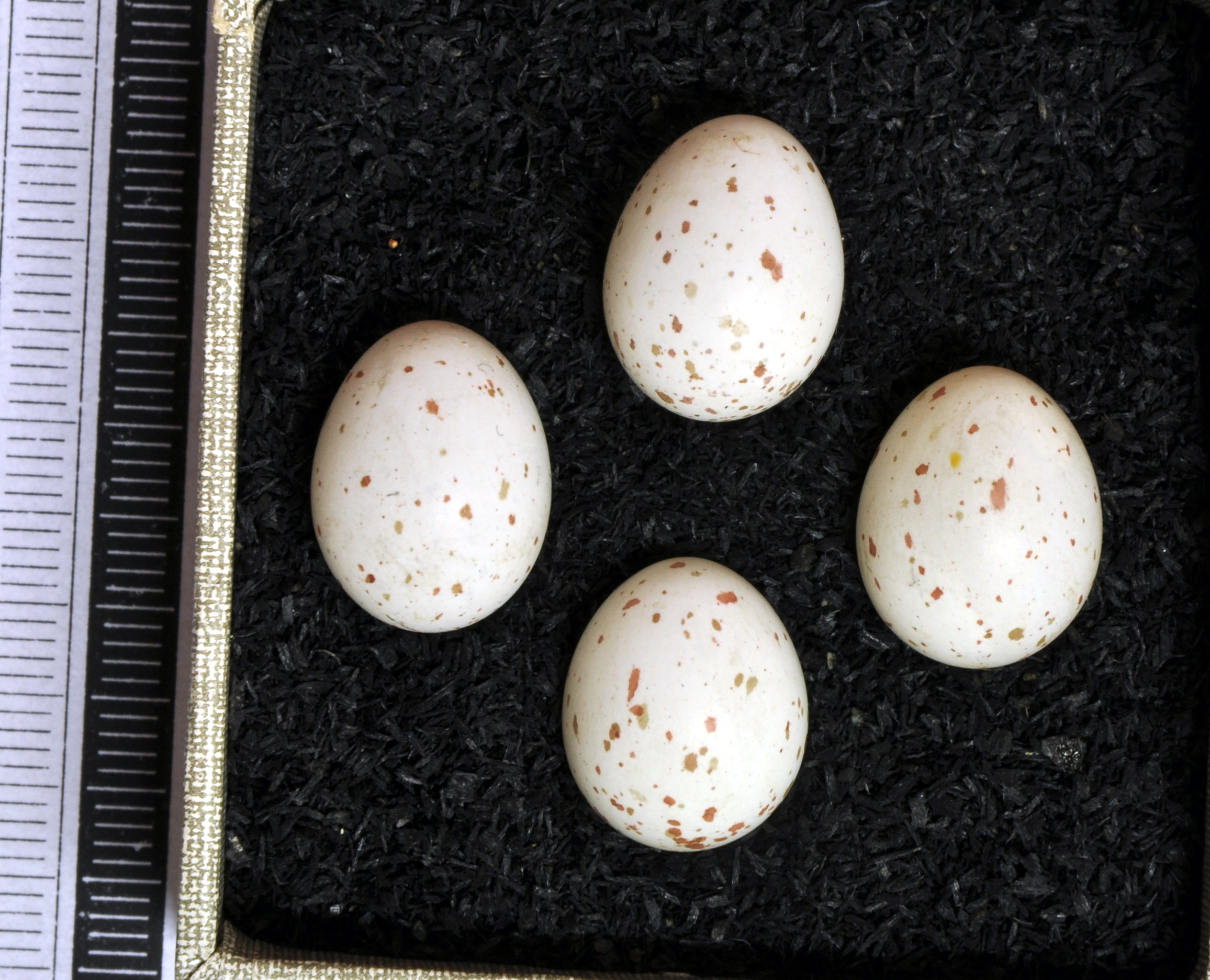
Eggs (Museum Wiesbaden)
