= Dillington Carr =

Protected area in Norfolk, England

Coordinates: 52.704°N 0.914°E

- Site of Special Scientific Interest
- Location of Dillington Carr.
- Area of search: Norfolk
- Grid reference: TF 970 158
- Interest: Biological
- Area: 55.0 hectares (136 acres)
- Notification date: 1986
- Location map: Magic Map

Dillington Carr is a 55-hectare (140-acre) biological Site of Special Scientific Interest north of Dereham in Norfolk, England.

This valley, which lies along a tributary of the River Wensum, has extensive irrigation reservoirs and areas of carr woodland. A large variety of birds breed on the site, including gadwalls, great crested grebe, and tufted ducks on the reservoirs and barn owls, lesser spotted woodpeckers, and willow tit in the woodland.

The site is privately owned and not open to the public.
