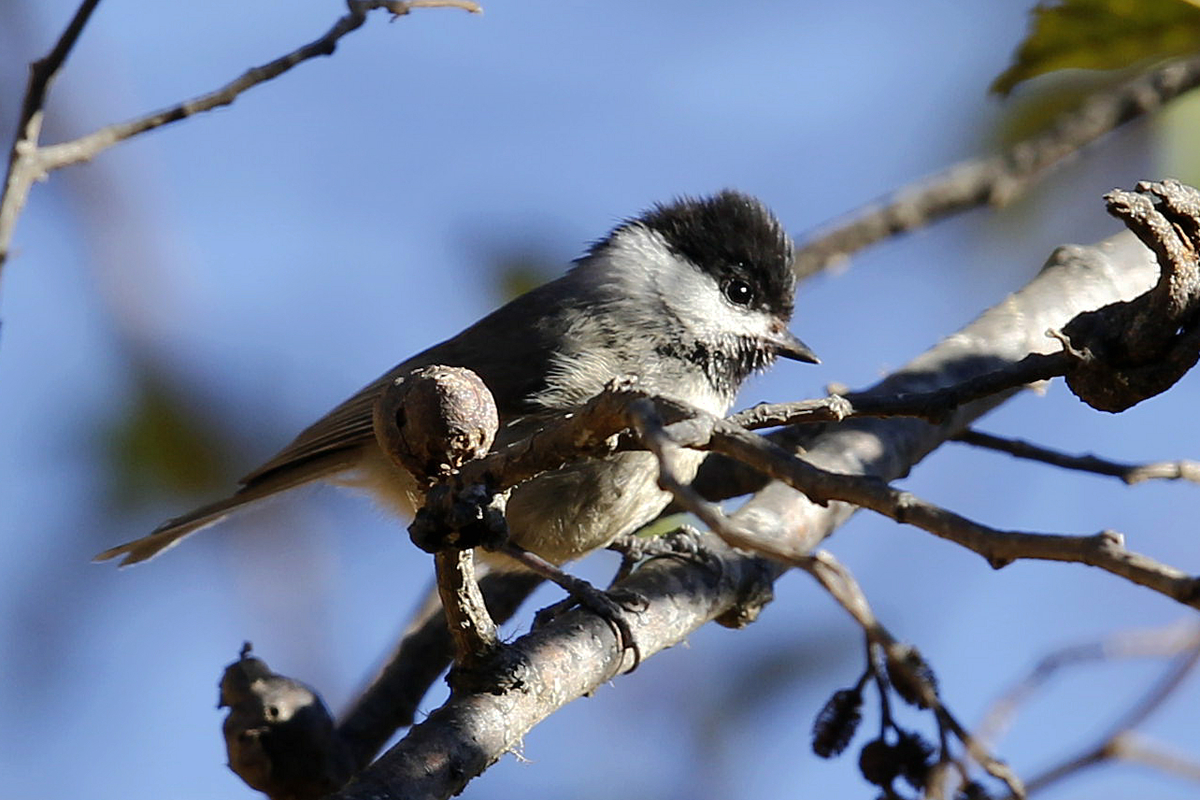

Conservation status
- Least Concern (IUCN 3.1)

Scientific classification
- Kingdom: Animalia
- Phylum: Chordata
- Class: Aves
- Order: Passeriformes
- Family: Paridae
- Genus: Poecile
- Species: P. hypermelaenus

Binomial name
- Poecile hypermelaenus Berezowski & Bianchi, 1891
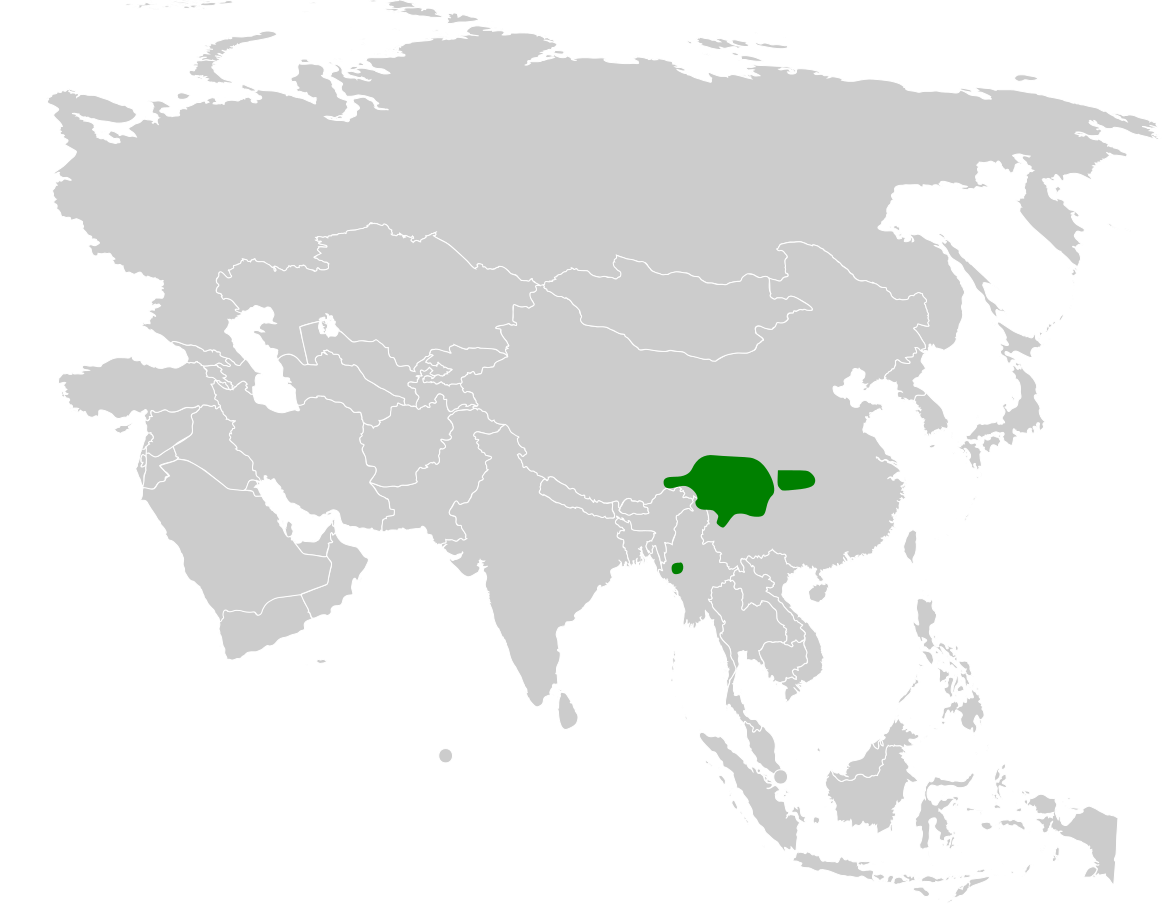
- Range of Poecile hypermelaenus

= Black-bibbed tit =

Species of bird

The black-bibbed tit (Poecile hypermelaenus) is a species of bird in the tit family Paridae. It is found from central and eastern China to southeast Tibet and western Myanmar.
