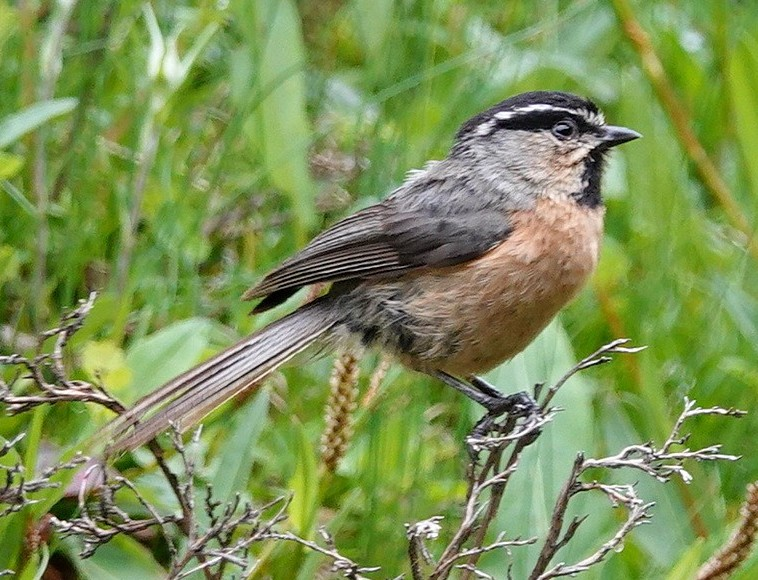

Conservation status
- Least Concern (IUCN 3.1)

Scientific classification
- Kingdom: Animalia
- Phylum: Chordata
- Class: Aves
- Order: Passeriformes
- Family: Paridae
- Genus: Poecile
- Species: P. superciliosus

Binomial name
- Poecile superciliosus Przewalski, 1876
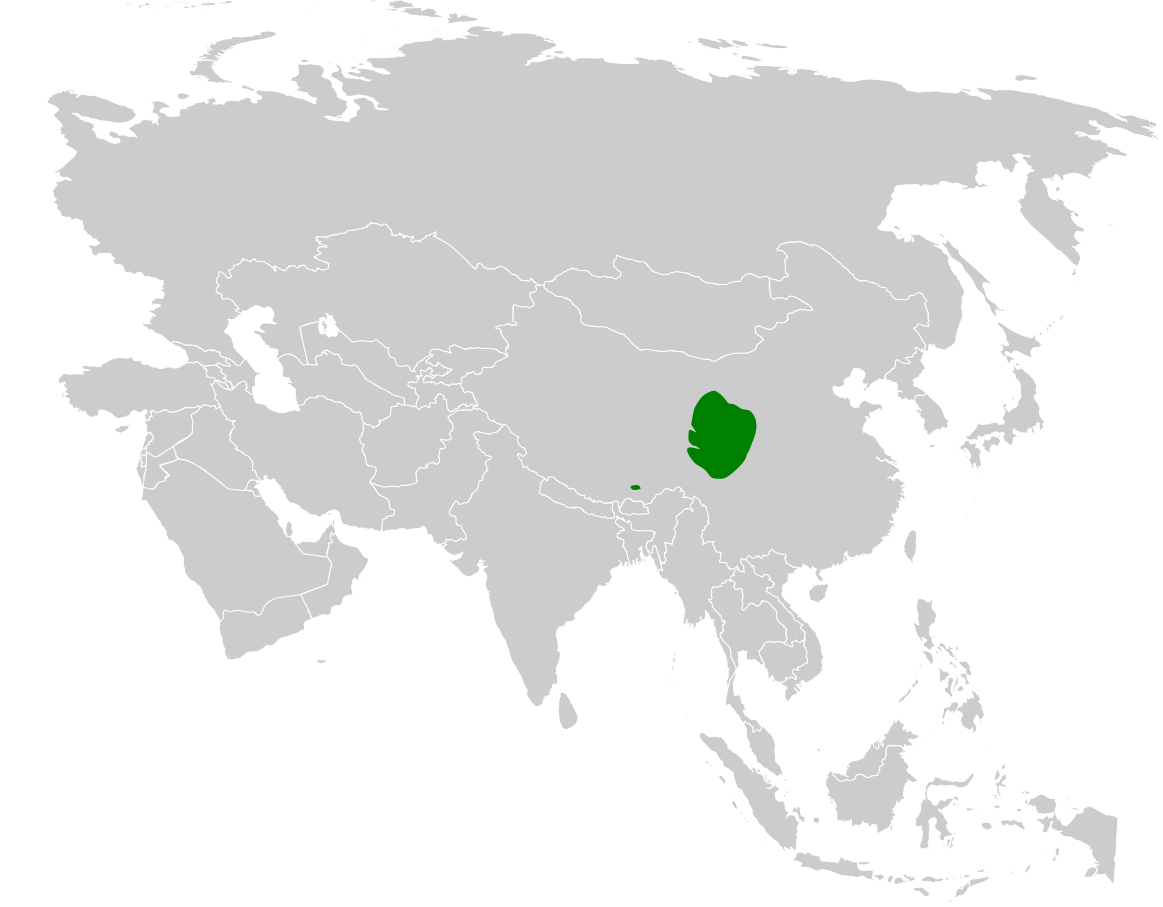

Synonyms
- Parus superciliosus

= White-browed tit =

Species of bird

The white-browed tit (Poecile superciliosus) is a species of bird in the tit family Paridae. It is endemic to the mountain forests of central China and Tibet.

It is 13.5–14 cm long, with a weight of 10–12 g. The plumage pattern is very similar to that of the western North American mountain chickadee P. gambeli (of which it has on occasion been considered a subspecies, despite its being on a different continent), differing in the breast and cheeks being rusty brown, not white, and having a longer and more sharply defined white eyebrow; the back is also a richer brown, not greyish-brown (del Hoyo et al. 2007).

It breeds in alpine shrub forests of Berberis, Rhamnus, Rhododendron, and Salix at 3,200–4,235 m altitude, descending in winter to slightly lower levels where it occurs in coniferous forests, primarily Picea. It nests on the ground in rock crevices or old rodent burrows (del Hoyo et al. 2007).

Molecular phylogenetic studies have shown that the white-browed tit is sister to the sombre tit (Poecile lugubris).
