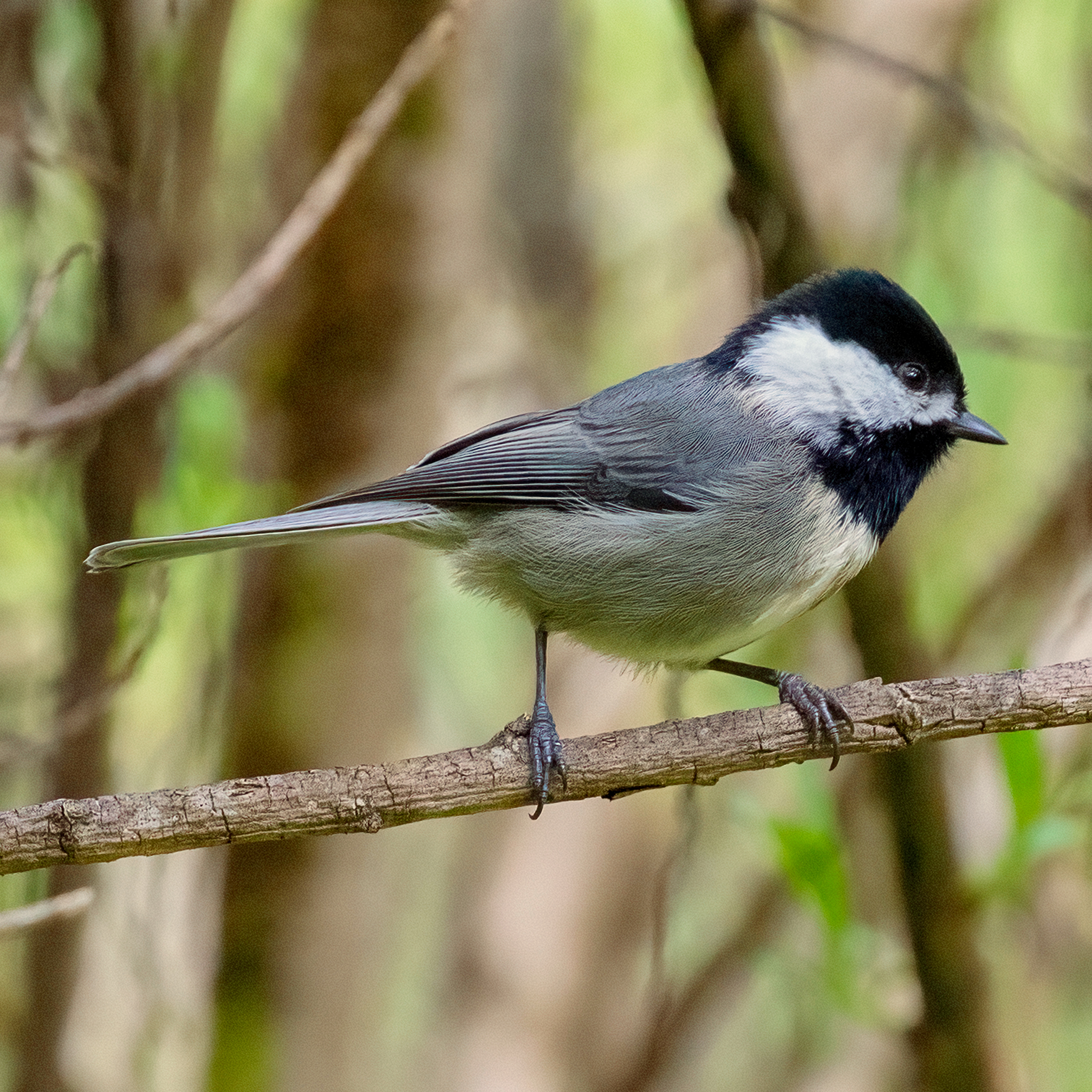
- Poecile sclateri rayi in Oaxaca, Mexico

Conservation status
- Least Concern (IUCN 3.1)

Scientific classification
- Kingdom: Animalia
- Phylum: Chordata
- Class: Aves
- Order: Passeriformes
- Family: Paridae
- Genus: Poecile
- Species: P. sclateri

Binomial name
- Poecile sclateri (Kleinschmidt, 1897)
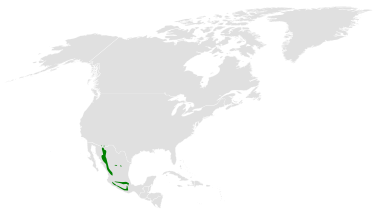
- Range of Poecile sclateri

Synonyms
- see text

= Mexican chickadee =

Species of bird

The Mexican chickadee (Poecile sclateri) is a small passerine songbird in the family Paridae, the tits and chickadees. It is found in Mexico and the U. S. states of Arizona and New Mexico.

== Taxonomy and systematics ==
The Mexican chickadee was originally described in 1857 as Parus meridionalis by Philip Sclater. However, that species name had already been applied to another species (the marsh tit, now Poecile palustris), by Wilhelm Lilljeborg in 1852, invalidating Sclater's name under the principle of priority. Otto Kleinschmidt noted this, and renamed it Parus sclateri in 1897, honoring the original discoverer. It remained included in the genus Parus for much of the twentieth century. Following a 1996 publication, in 1998 the American Ornithologists' Union reassigned it to Poecile, a genus that had been erected in 1829 and had long been treated as a subgenus of Parus. A 2005 paper used mtDNA cytochrome b sequence data and morphology to agree with that change and suggest it should be universally adopted. BirdLife International's Handbook of the Birds of the World did so in 2016 and the IOC and the Clements taxonomy followed suit by 2018.

The Mexican chickadee has four accepted subspecies:

- P. s. eidos (Peters, JL, 1927)
- P. s. garzai (Phillips, AR, 1986)
- P. s. sclateri (Kleinschmidt, 1897)
- P. s. rayi (Miller, AH & Storer, 1950)

== Description ==
The Mexican chickadee is about 13 cm (5.1 in) long and weighs 9 to 12 g (0.32 to 0.42 oz). The sexes have the same plumage. Adults have a black head from the level of the eyes up and a black hindneck, both with a faint bluish gloss. They have pure black cheeks, chin, throat, and upper breast, and the rest of their face is white. The black on the chin and throat is conspicuously more extensive than on other chickadees, stretching onto the upper breast. Their back, scapulars, rump, and uppertail coverts are deep olive gray or mouse gray, with the strongest olive on the rump. Their wings and tail are slate gray with paler gray edges on most flight feathers. Their lower breast and belly are white and their sides, flanks, and undertail coverts paler olive gray than their back. They have a dark brown iris, a black bill, and bluish legs and feet. Juveniles' heads are grayer than adults'. The subspecies differ slightly in size but are not separable in the field.

== Distribution and habitat ==
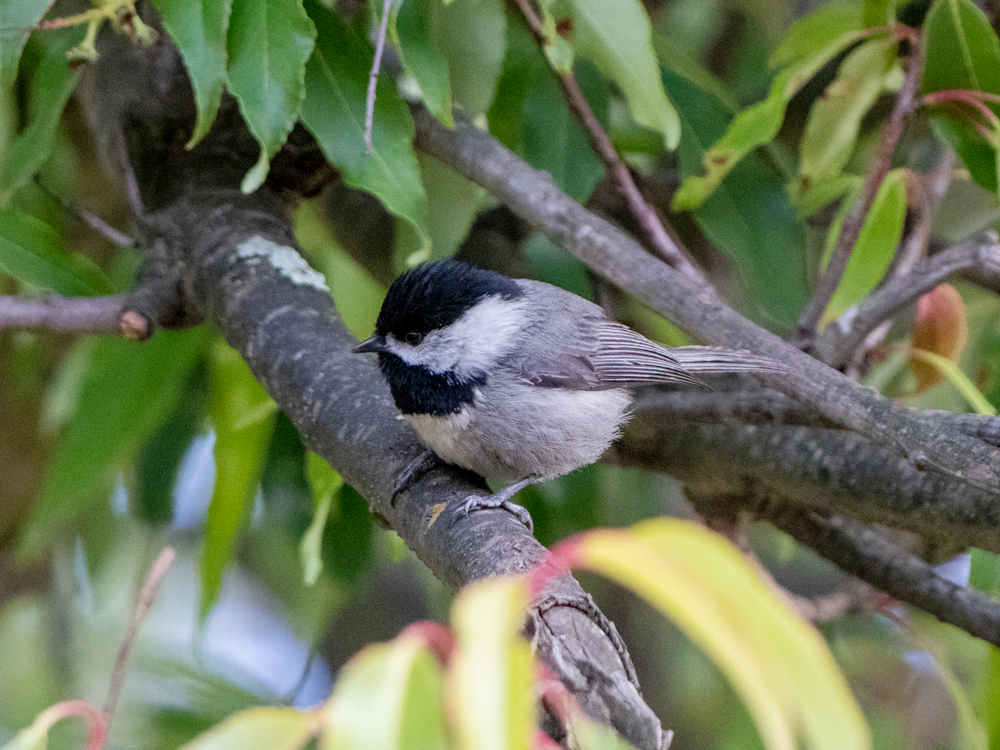
Nominate P. s. sclateri in Mexico State, Mexico

The Mexican chickadee has a disjunct distribution, with the four subspecies having separated distributions; these are:

- P. s. eidos: from extreme southeastern Arizona and extreme southwestern New Mexico, south through the Sierra Madre Occidental of northern Mexico south to Durango; formerly also reported from the Davis Mountains of Texas
- P. s. garzai: northeastern Mexico in the southeastern Coahuila - west-central Nuevo León area
- P. s. sclateri: western Mexico from southeastern Sinaloa to Puebla and western Veracruz
- P. s. rayi: western Mexico from southern Jalisco to Oaxaca

The Mexican chickadee inhabits pine, pine-oak, and spruce/fir forest in the subtropical and tropical zones at elevations between 1,500 and 3,900 m (4,900 and 12,800 ft). In the U. S. it is primarily found in coniferous forest above about 2,100 m (6,900 ft) when breeding. In Mexico it occurs in all three types and is most common above about 2,200 m (7,200 ft).

== Behavior ==
=== Movement ===
The Mexican chickadee is a year-round resident in most of its range but in Arizona, New Mexico, and in scattered locations in Mexico some individuals move to lower elevations for the non-breeding season.

=== Feeding ===
The Mexican chickadee feeds mostly on adult and larval insects. It forages throughout conifers but tends to forage in the crown and on the periphery of deciduous trees. It typically gleans its food from leaves and twigs, sometimes hanging upside-down to reach it. It sometimes takes it while briefly hovering. It has not been observed caching food. In winter it commonly forages as part of a mixed-species feeding flock that may have as many as 100 members.

=== Breeding ===
The Mexican chickadee breeds primarily between early April and mid-July. It nests in cavities, both natural and human-made such as nest boxes, and the species is thought to excavate some cavities. Females build the nest, a cup of soft materials such as hair, moss, and catkins. Clutches of up to nine eggs have been found; the eggs are dull white with small pale reddish brown spots. Only the female incubates the clutch and broods nestlings, but both parents provision young. The incubation period and time to fledging are not known.

Uniquely for any species in the family Paridae, it has been recorded applying crushed toxic beetles to the outside of the nest hole, presumably to deter potential nest predators.

=== Vocalization ===
The Mexican chickadee's song is "a series of short abrupt phrases peeta peeta peeta". Its principal calls are "a high buzzy sschleeeer" and "a high, buzzy, and hissing tzee tzee shhh shhh".

== Status ==
The IUCN has assessed the Mexican chickadee as being of Least Concern. It has a very large range; its estimated population of two million mature individuals is believed to be decreasing. No immediate threats have been identified. "The long-term future of U.S. populations of Mexican Chickadee and other Sierra Madrean animals may be precarious" due to their limited distribution and discontinuous habitat...Chickadees use a broader range of forest types in Mexico than in the U.S., and the species thus seems less threatened there."
