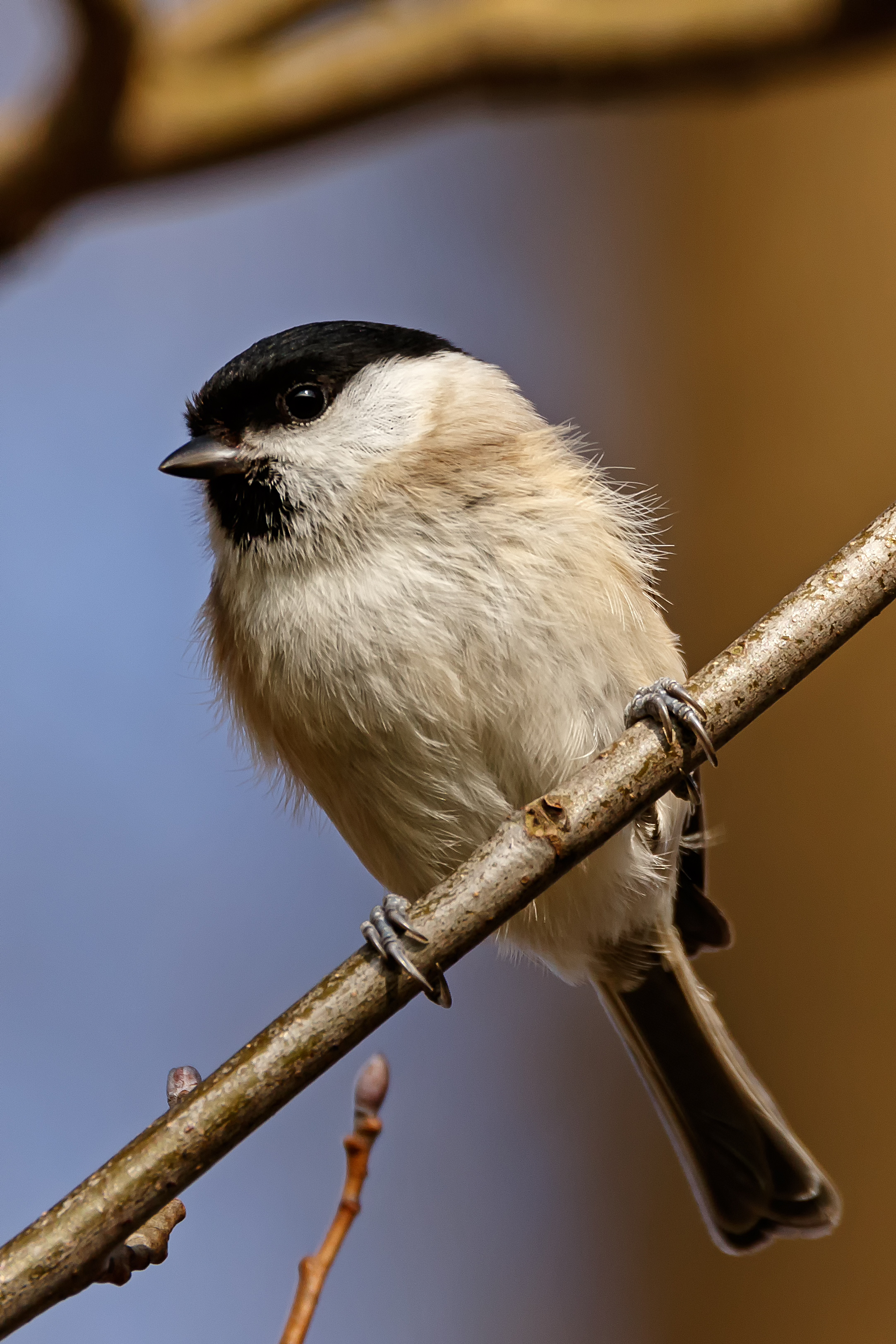
- Marsh tit, Poecile palustris
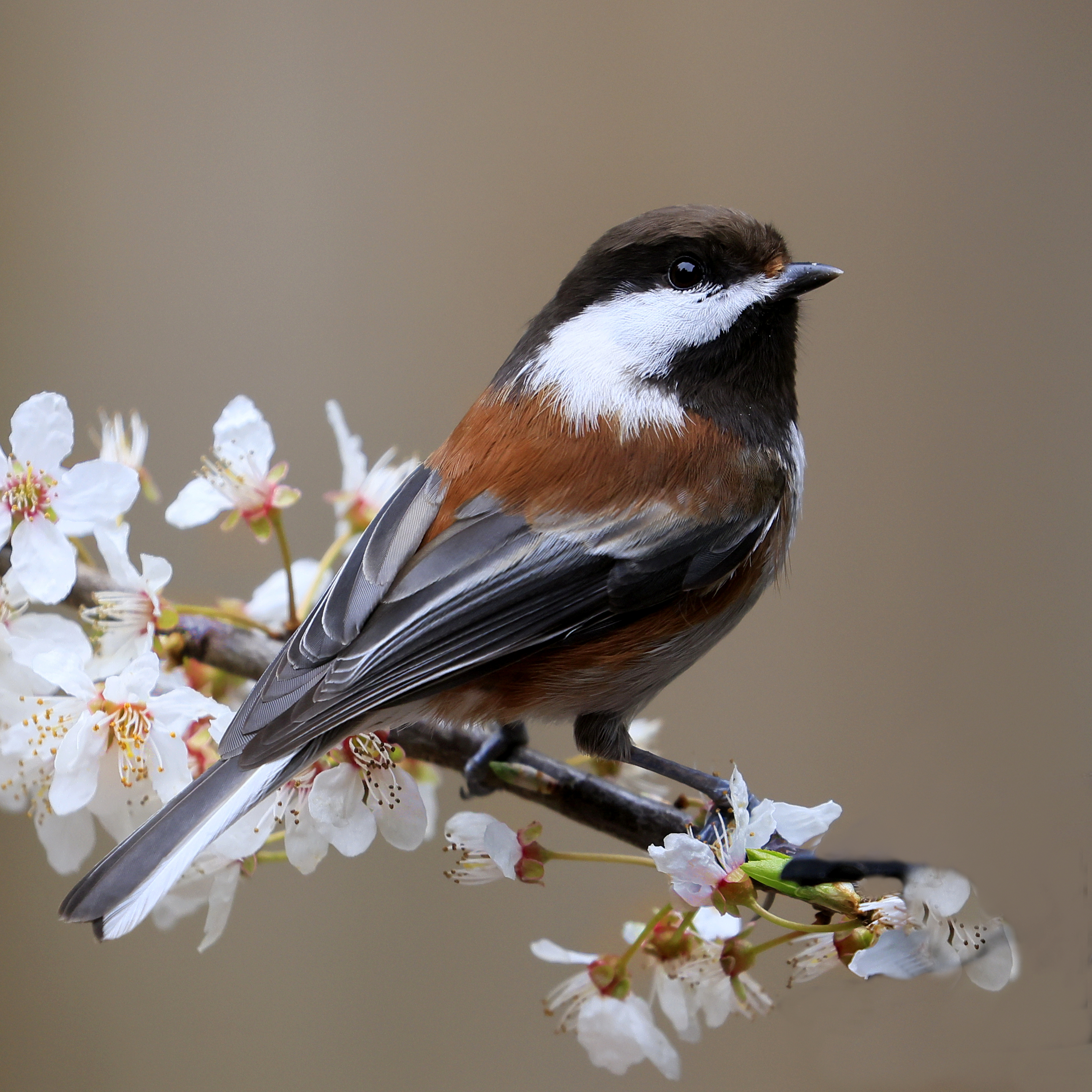
- Chestnut-backed chickadee, Poecile rufescens

Scientific classification
- Kingdom: Animalia
- Phylum: Chordata
- Class: Aves
- Order: Passeriformes
- Family: Paridae
- Genus: Poecile; Kaup, 1829

Type species
- Parus palustris Linnaeus, 1758

Species
- see text
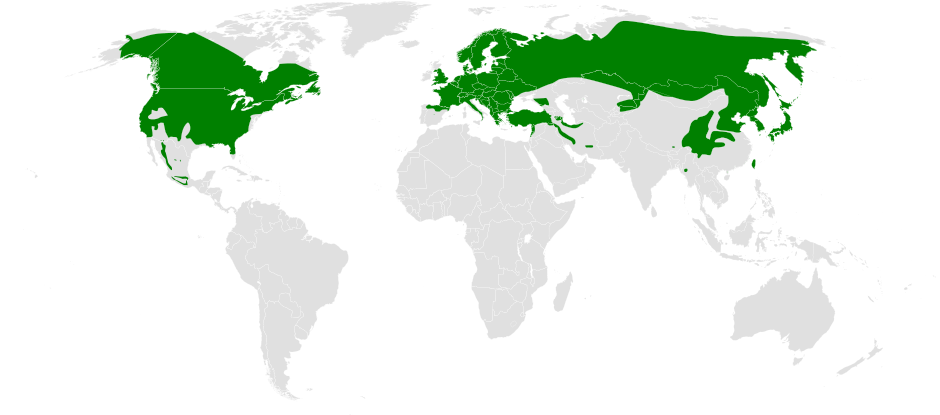
- Combined map of all Poecile species

= Poecile =

Genus of birds in the tit family Paridae

Poecile is a genus of birds in the tit family Paridae. It contains 15 species, which are distributed across Europe, Asia, and North America; the European and Asian species are known as tits, and the North American species as chickadees. In the past, most authorities retained Poecile as a subgenus within the genus Parus, but treatment as a distinct genus, initiated by the American Ornithologists Union, is now widely accepted. This is supported by mtDNA cytochrome b sequence analysis.

The genus Poecile was described by the German naturalist Johann Jakob Kaup in 1829. Kaup included two species in the genus, marsh tit Poecile palustris and coal tit P. ater; the type species was subsequently designated as the marsh tit by English zoologist George Robert Gray in 1842 (with coal tit now in the genus Periparus). The name Poecile was derived by Kaup from the Ancient Greek adjective ποικίλος, poikilos ("multicolored"); the related word ποικιλίς, poikilis, is recorded by Aristotle as the name of a small bird, sometimes identified with the goldfinch. It had traditionally been treated as feminine, giving name endings such as cincta; however, this was not specified by Kaup, and under the ICZN the genus name must therefore be treated by default as masculine, giving name endings such as cinctus.

- Poecile
  - - White-browed tit (Poecile superciliosus)
    - Sombre tit (Poecile lugubris)
  - - - - Grey-headed chickadee (Poecile cinctus)
        - - Chestnut-backed chickadee (Poecile rufescens)
          - Boreal chickadee (Poecile hudsonicus)
      - - - Mexican chickadee (Poecile sclateri)
          - - Carolina chickadee (Poecile carolinensis)
            - - Black-capped chickadee (Poecile atricapillus)
              - Mountain chickadee (Poecile gambeli)
    - - Père David's tit (Poecile davidi)
      - - - Black-bibbed tit (Poecile hypermelaenus)
          - Marsh tit (Poecile palustris)
        - - Sichuan tit (Poecile weigoldicus)
          - - Caspian tit (Poecile hyrcanus)
            - Willow tit (Poecile montanus)

Phylogeny of the Poecile based on Tritsch et al. 2017.

== Species ==
The genus includes the following fifteen species:

Image	Common name	Scientific name	Distribution
	White-browed tit	Poecile superciliosus	central China and Tibet.
	Sombre tit	Poecile lugubris	southeast Europe and southwest Asia
	Grey-headed chickadee (North American name) or Siberian tit (European name)	Poecile cinctus	subarctic Scandinavia and northern Asia, and also into North America in Alaska and the far northwest of Canada
	Chestnut-backed chickadee	Poecile rufescens	Pacific Northwest of the United States and western Canada, from southern Alaska to southwestern California
	Boreal chickadee	Poecile hudsonicus	Canada, Alaska, and northernmost portions of the lower 48 United States
	Mexican chickadee	Poecile sclateri	Mexico
	Carolina chickadee	Poecile carolinensis	United States from New Jersey west to southern Kansas and south to Florida and Texas
	Black-capped chickadee	Poecile atricapillus	Across North America, from New England to Newfoundland in the east, and from Washington to Alaska in the west
	Mountain chickadee	Poecile gambeli	western United States
	Père David's tit	Poecile davidi	central China in southern Gansu, western Hubei, southern Shaanxi and Sichuan
	Black-bibbed tit	Poecile hypermelaenus	central and eastern China to southeast Tibet and western Myanmar.
	Marsh tit	Poecile palustris	temperate Europe and northern Asia
	Sichuan tit	Poecile weigoldicus	central China
	Caspian tit	Poecile hyrcanus	northern Iran, just extending into Azerbaijan.
	Willow tit	Poecile montanus	temperate and subarctic Europe and northern Asia

All the species are roughly similar in size, ranging from 11–15 cm, with marsh, willow, and black-bibbed tits marginally the smallest (11–13 cm), and sombre tit and mountain chickadee marginally the largest (13–15 cm). The plumage pattern is also broadly similar across the genus, with a black or dark brown crown and bib, whitish or pale buffy cheeks, and whitish to buffy underparts. Two species (white-browed tit and mountain chickadee) differ in having a white supercilium. The back and wings are brown to grey-brown or reddish brown, in some with pale fringes on the secondary feathers.

== Behaviour ==
Many species have alarm calls with a distinctive "chick-a-dee-dee-dee" format, which gives rise to the name 'chickadee'; the number of "dees" depends on the predator and the risk it poses, with more "dees" for high risk predators such as small owls.

== Ecology ==
All species in this genus are birds of mature woodlands and forests, often with a preference for old-growth habitats with plentiful tree cavities for nesting; many, but not all, readily adapt to human provision of food and nestboxes.

Several species, including Siberian, marsh and willow tits in Eurasia and mountain chickadee in North America, are food-caching birds. Siberian tit, living in the coldest environment, is the greatest hoarder, with individual birds storing up to half a million food items throughout each year for winter use. Mountain chickadees can hide as many as 80,000 individual seeds each, which they retrieve during the winter. Their ability to do so depends on their spatial memory of the locations. Birds that live in harsher conditions, where their ability to remember the location of food is more important, have been found to have better memory abilities, a larger hippocampus, and more neurons than chickadees that live in milder climates where food sources are easier to find without relying on memory.

== In culture ==
The chickadee (specifically the black-capped chickadee P. atricapillus) is the official bird for the US state of Massachusetts, the Canadian province of New Brunswick, as well as the cities of Calgary, Alberta, and Regina, Saskatchewan. The chickadee is also the state bird of Maine, but a species has never been specified. A proposed bill in 2019 would have named the black-capped chickadee as the official species for Maine, but was unanimously voted down in committee. The de facto species for Maine remains the black-capped.
