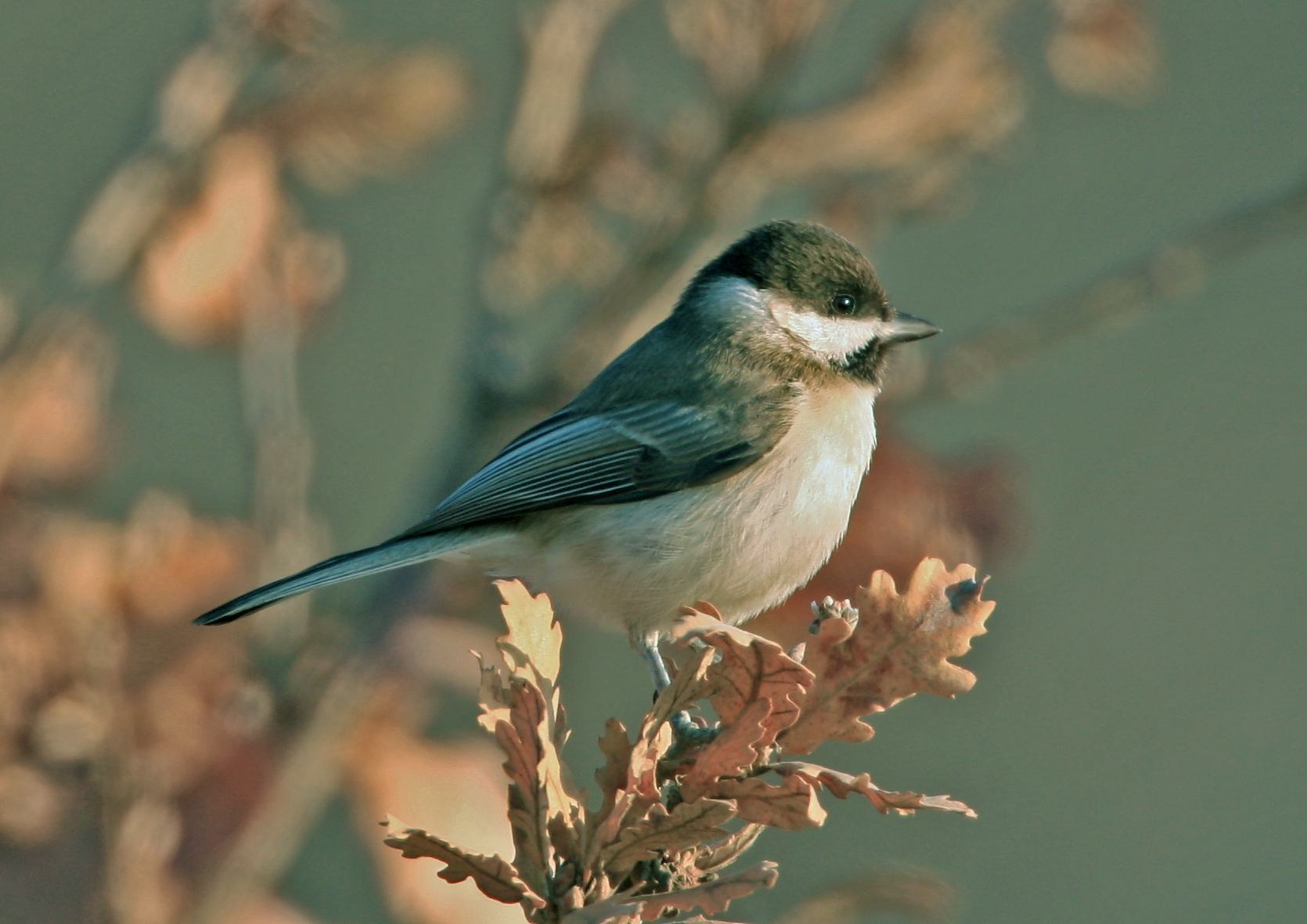

Conservation status
- Least Concern (IUCN 3.1)

Scientific classification
- Kingdom: Animalia
- Phylum: Chordata
- Class: Aves
- Order: Passeriformes
- Family: Paridae
- Genus: Poecile
- Species: P. lugubris

Binomial name
- Poecile lugubris (Temminck, 1820)
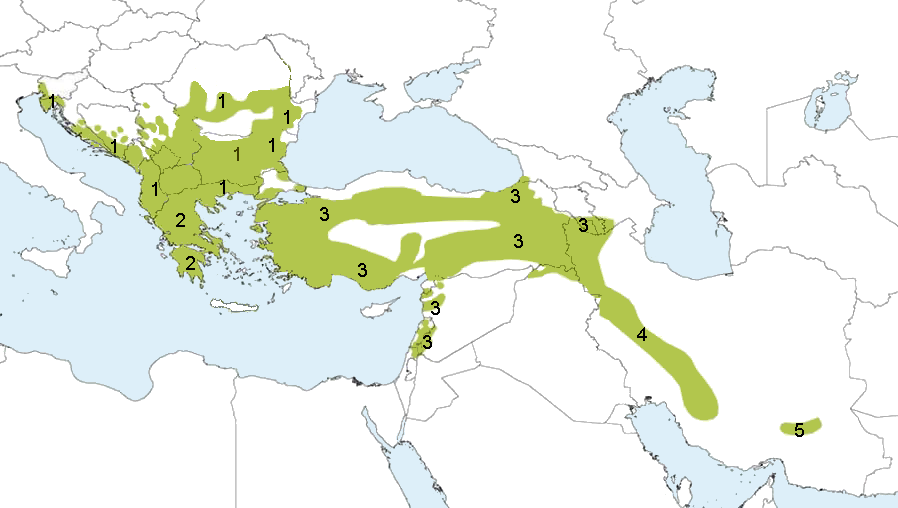
- Range of Poecile lugubris 1 P. l. lugubris 2 P. l. lugens 3 P. l. anatoliae 4 P. l. dubius 5 P. l. kirmanensis

Synonyms
- Parus lugubris Temminck, 1820

= Sombre tit =

Species of bird

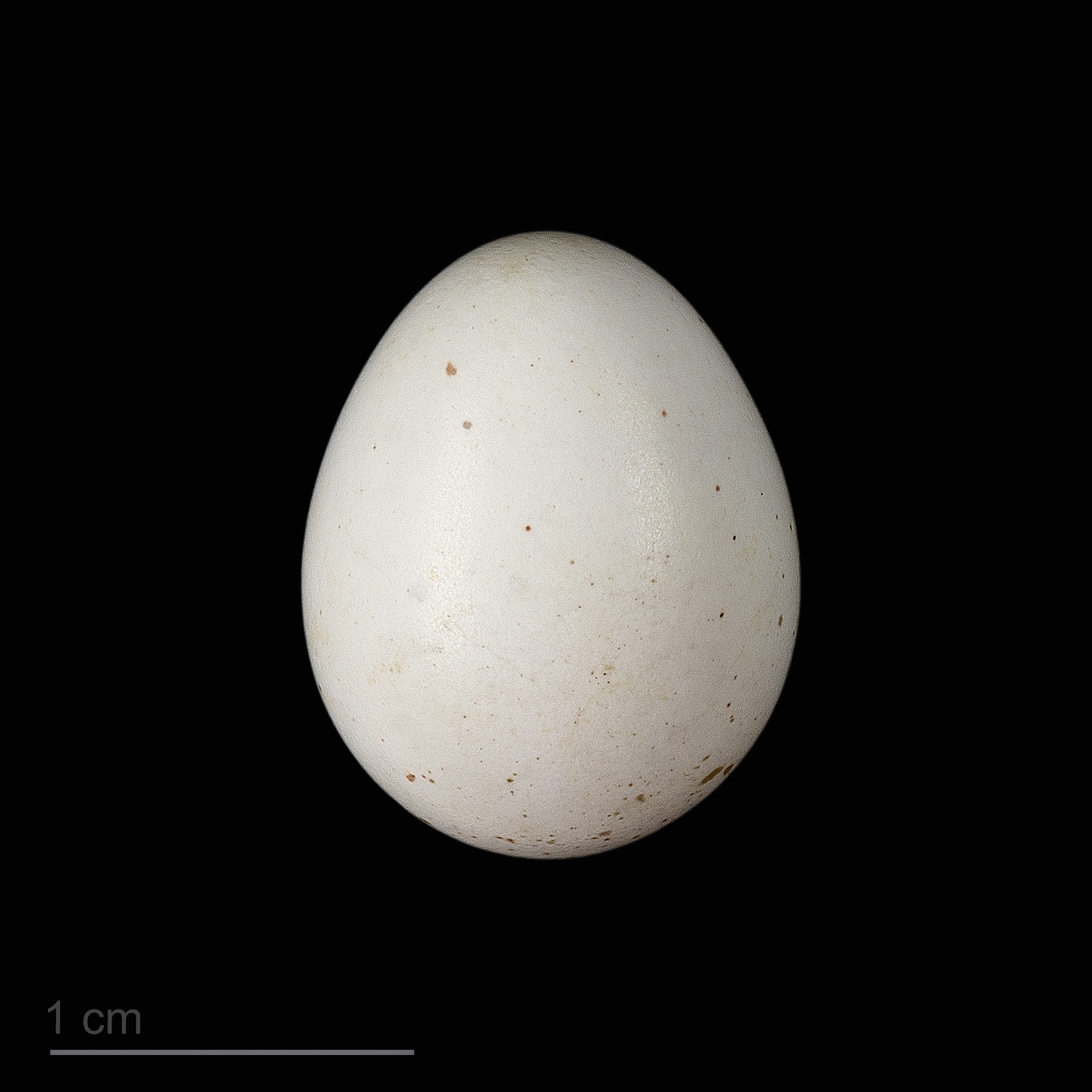
Poecile lugubris - (MHNT)

The sombre tit (Poecile lugubris) is a species of passerine bird belonging to the family Paridae, the "true" tits and chickadees. This species is found in southeast Europe and southwest Asia.

== Taxonomy ==
The sombre tit was first formally described as Parus lugubris in 1820 by the Dutch zoologist Temminck with its type locality given as "Dalmatia and Hungary". This species is now classified in the genus Poecile rather than Parus. Molecular phylogenetic studies have shown that the sombre tit is sister to the white-browed tit (Poecile superciliosus).

=== Subspecies ===
Five subspecies are accepted:

- Poecile lugubris lugubris (Temminck, CJ, 1820) — southeastern Europe, southward to northern Greece; Crete
- Poecile lugubris lugens (Brehm, CL, 1855) — central and southern Greece
- Poecile lugubris anatoliae (Hartert, EJO, 1905) — Turkey to southwestern Georgia eastward to northwestern Iran, and south to Lebanon
- Poecile lugubris dubius (Hellmayr, CE, 1901) — western Iran (Zagros Mountains); winters to northeastern Iraq
- Poecile lugubris kirmanensis (Koelz, WN, 1950) — southern Iran (mountains of Kerman region)

== Description ==
The sombre tit is 13–15 cm long and weighs 16–19 g, slightly smaller than a great tit (Parus major) and with similar proportions, although in plumage it more resembles a willow tit (Poecile montanus) or marsh tit (P. palustris) but it has a brownish to grey-black cap which extends further into the sides of the head with the off-white cheek patch being restricted to a narrow triangle by the larger bib. The head is often peaked when the bird is in an upright stance, unlike the willow tit. Compared to the partly sympatric marsh tit, the sombre tit is larger and has a proportionately longer tail. The juveniles are duller and tinged with brown than the adults.

== Distribution ==
The sombre tit is found in southeastern Europe, in the Balkans, and Western Asia. Its range extends from Slovenia and Romania, south as far as Crete and to East Thrace, in Turkey. In Asia its extends across Anatolia, from the Greek island of Lesbos, into the southern Caucasus in Armenia, Georgia and Azerbaijan, east into Iraq and Iran and south to Israel and Lebanon. It is a vagrant in northeastern Italy. Despite the citation by Temminck of Hungary in its protologue, it has not been recorded there.

== Habitat and behaviour ==
Sombre tits occur in low density in thin woodlands from sea level to 1,600 metres, rarely 2,800 m, above sea level. These birds are associated with mosaic landscapes where there is moderate shrub and tree cover and which receive a relatively high amount of insolation. They will forage in tree and bushes as well as on the ground.

Similar to the other tit species, the sombre tit is a cavity-nesting species, which nests in holes in juniper, willow, poplar, and other relevant tree species. In some cases they nest in iron pipes (e.g. those used for orchard fencing), and in artificial nest-boxes.

The clutch usually consists of 4 to 9 eggs, having two clutches per year. They breed on mountain slopes, in open deciduous forest, lower down on in trees and bushes in rocky terrain, and in fruit orchards. The breeding season lasts from early April until the beginning of August.

Their diet mainly consists of insects, especially caterpillars and other larvae. It forages on the ground and in lower branches.
