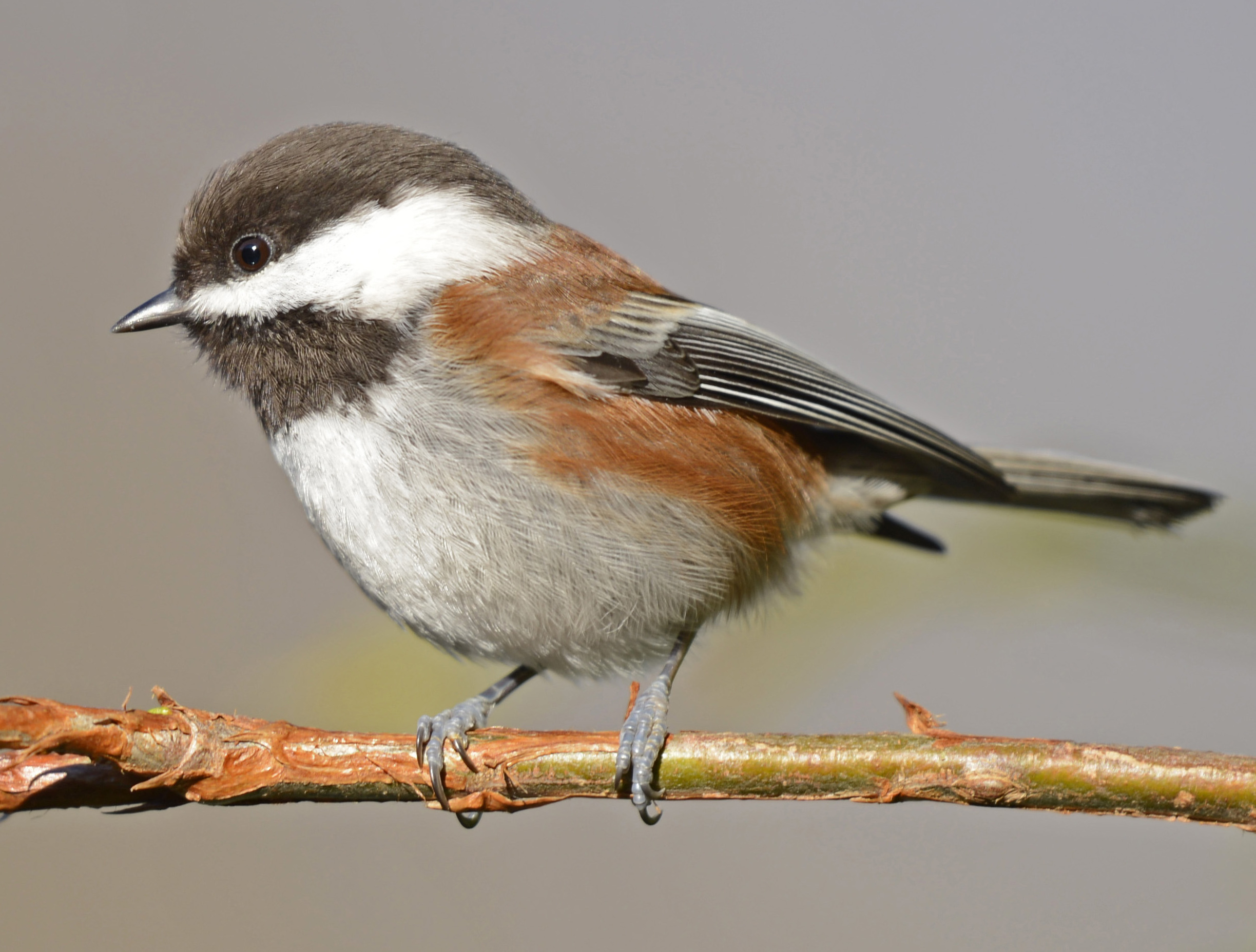

Conservation status
- Least Concern (IUCN 3.1)

Scientific classification
- Kingdom: Animalia
- Phylum: Chordata
- Class: Aves
- Order: Passeriformes
- Family: Paridae
- Genus: Poecile
- Species: P. rufescens

Binomial name
- Poecile rufescens (Townsend, JK, 1837)
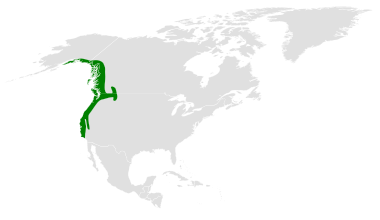
- Range of Poecile rufescens

Synonyms
- Parus rufescens

= Chestnut-backed chickadee =

Species of bird

The chestnut-backed chickadee (Poecile rufescens) is a small passerine bird in the tit family, native to western North America.

== Taxonomy ==
In the early 20th century, Joseph Grinnell hypothesized that the chestnut-backed chickadee diverged from the boreal chickadee (Poecile hudsonicus), because both species inhabited similar coniferous forest environments. Grinnell noted that the main differences between the boreal chickadee and the chestnut-backed were in the shade and tone of their respective brown coloration. He drew parallels between the varied chickadee characteristics using the fact that some bird species become smaller and more vibrantly brown as their habitat becomes more humid. Modern molecular phylogenetic studies have confirmed that the chestnut-backed chickadee is sister to the boreal chickadee since there were strong genetic similarities in mitochondrial DNA. More recent research regarding the population distribution of the chestnut-backed chickadee suggests that the genetic fragmentation of the chestnut-backed chickadee from the boreal chickadee was due to the changing glacial landscapes of the Pleistocene era. After this species divergence, the chestnut-backed chickadee migrated south to inhabit the range described above.

=== Subspecies ===
There are three subspecies, with the flanks being grayer and less rufous further south:

- Poecile rufescens rufescens (Townsend, 1837). Nominate subspecies; Alaska south to northwest California. Broad rufous band on flanks.
- Poecile rufescens neglectus (Ridgway, 1879). Coastal central California (Marin County). Narrow rufous band on flanks.
- Poecile rufescens barlowi (Grinnell, 1900). Coastal southwestern California (south of San Francisco Bay). Almost no rufous color on flanks.

In addition to these three subspecies, research on the geographical range of chestnut-backed chickadees suggests that there are also four "genetically distinct" groups of chestnut-backed chickadee in North America. Including the populations in Alaska and Coastal North America, there are also separate populations inhabiting the Queen Charlotte Islands and British Columbia. In fact, the chestnut-backed chickadee is the only species of chickadee that resides on the British Columbia Islands.

== Distribution and habitat ==
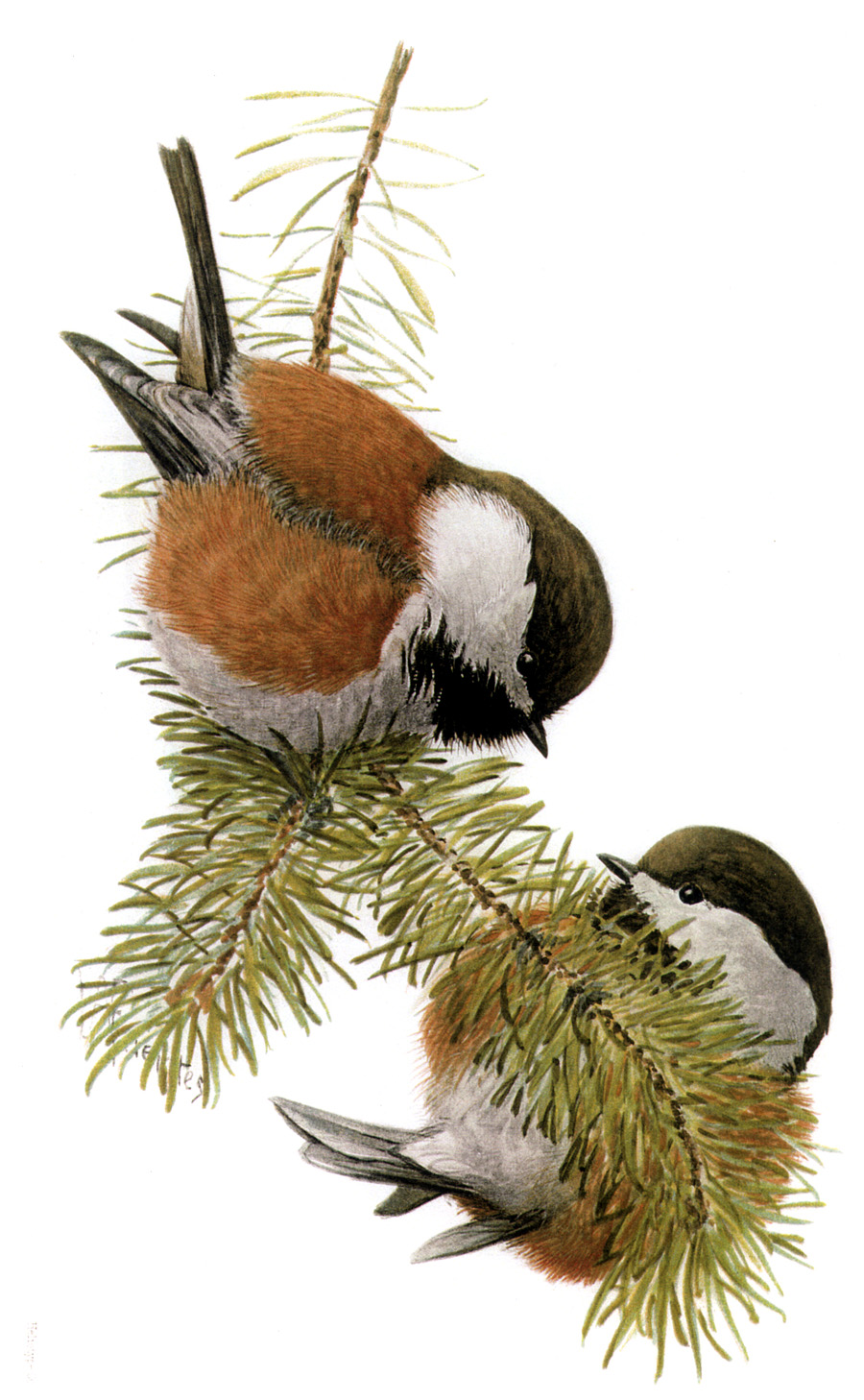
An illustration of two chestnut-backed chickadees by Louis Agassiz Fuertes

It is found in the Pacific Northwest of the United States and western Canada, from southeastern Alaska to southwestern California. Its geographical range hugs the humid, foggy coasts. It is a permanent resident within its range, with some seasonal movements as feeding flocks move short distances in search of food. These chickadees usually move to lower elevations in the same area upon onset of winter and move back up to higher elevations in late summer. Its habitat is low elevation coniferous and mixed coniferous forests, consisting mainly of Douglas fir, western hemlock, and western redcedar. This environment provides plenty of shade and constant, cool temperature. In fact, the abundance of Douglas fir trees can be a helpful indicator for the population of chestnut-backed chickadees in the region. In the San Francisco Bay Area, this bird has readily adapted to suburban settings, prompting expansion farther inland. Chestnut-backed chickadees are able to thrive in these areas by making good use of planted trees and shrubs that closely resemble their natural forest habitat. The food and nesting spots in gardens and parks help them survive and reproduce successfully.

The species’ adaptability is further supported by studies of its range expansion in the mid-20th century. It is revealed that the population was stably established in newly colonized forest areas because they simply changed their foraging behavior and habitat use to reduce competition with resident bird species. In these areas, chickadees altered where they foraged within trees as well as the types of vegetation they foraged on, which allowed them to successfully integrate into mixed-species feeding flocks. It is concluded that the ability of the chestnut-backed chickadees to exploit diverse forest structural habitats and change their ecological niche led to their successful range expansion and persistence within changing environments over time.

== Description ==
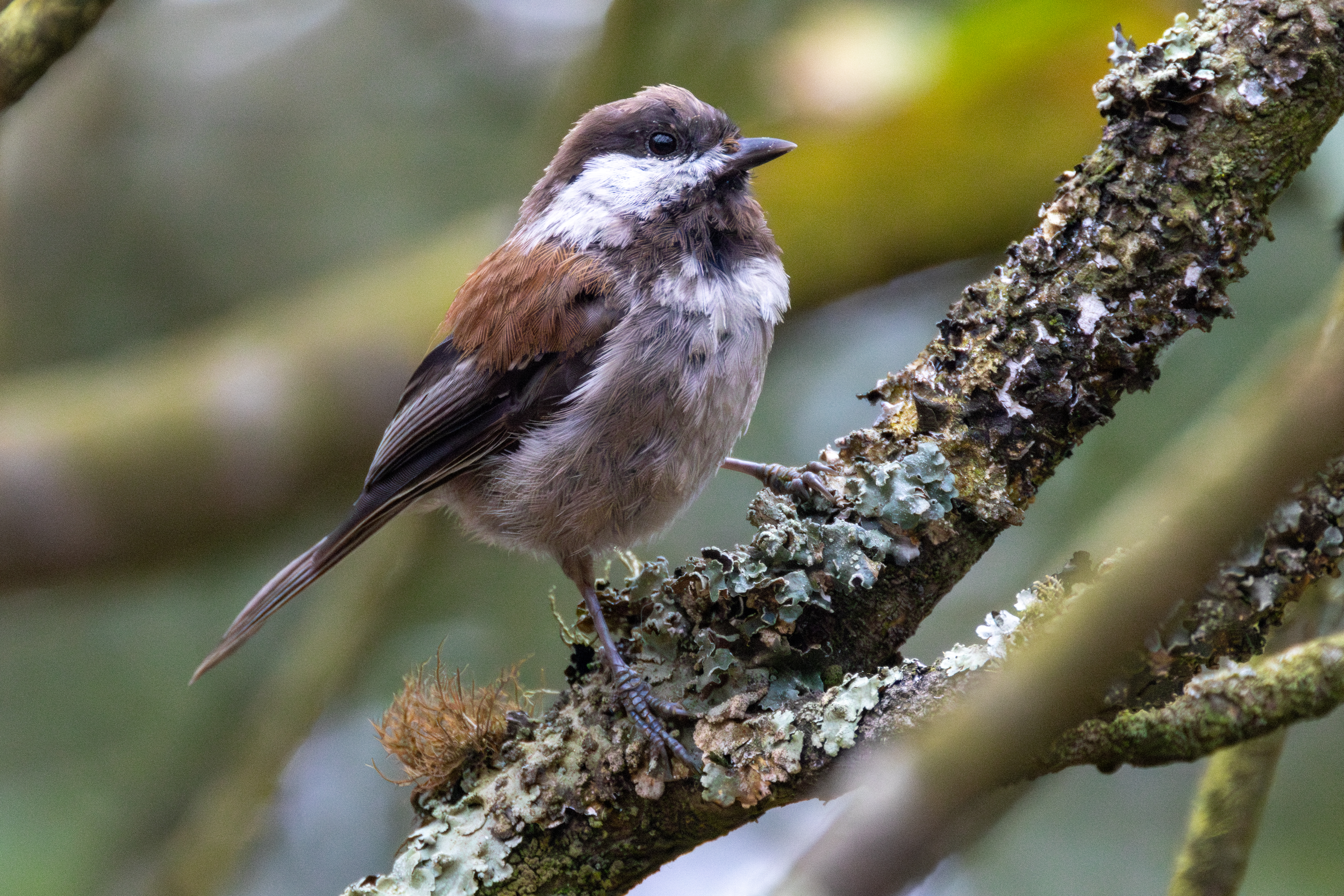
Chestnut-backed chickadee.

It is a small chickadee, 11.5–12.5 cm (4.5–4.9 in) long with a weight of 8.5–12.6 g (0.30–0.44 oz). The head is dark blackish-brown with white cheeks, the mantle is bright rufous-brown, the wing feathers are dark gray with paler fringes. The underparts are white to pale grayish-white, with rufous or pale gray flanks. It is often considered the most vibrant of all chickadees.

Joseph Grinnell was one of the first to provide a significantly detailed description of this variation. He found that northern areas of the range that were much hotter showed deeper, richer chestnut plumage, whereas the drier southern areas consisted of lighter and grayer chickadees.

Chickadees are able to use nocturnal hypothermia to regulate energy expenditure, allowing them to survive harsh winters where other bird species not utilizing thermal regulation would not be able to. Some estimates put the energy conserved while using nocturnal hypothermia all the way up to 32%.

== Diet and foraging ==
Chestnut-backed chickadees feed largely on insects and other invertebrates gleaned from foliage (especially from that of the Douglas fir). They often move through the forest in mixed feeding flocks, and can be spotted in large groups with bushtits, warblers, red-breasted nuthatches, and kinglets. Chestnut-backed chickadees also eat seeds and plant matter, especially those of conifers, and fruit. It will visit bird feeders, including hummingbird feeders, and especially loves suet.

== Sounds ==
Chestnut-backed chickadees can be identified by their “chick-a-dee” call, with “dee” repeated a few times. Adults and older nestlings can also be identified by their hissing noise, which mimics a snake while protecting their nests. They rarely use their “gargle” calls.

Acoustic analyses have revealed that the “chick-a-dee” call consists of separated note types (A, C, D, and Dh) that are produced in quite similar sequences. These calls might reveal information regarding the species’ identity as well as the geographic origin.

== Mating and nesting ==
Chestnut-backed chickadees mate monogamously, and can stay with the same partner for years. These chickadees are cavity-nesters, preferring tree-stump holes and nest boxes, usually utilizing an abandoned woodpecker hole, but sometimes excavating on their own. During nesting season, the female chickadee will spend about a week building the nest on her own. She builds the under layers of the nest from moss and tree bark, with layer of fur on top. Chestnut-backed chickadees use much fur and hair to make their nests. Their nests are actually 50% fur and hair. The most common hair they use comes from deer, rabbits, and coyotes. The adult chickadees also make a layer of fur about a centimeter thick which is used to cover the eggs on the nest whenever they leave the nest. The female lays 5–8 (sometimes 9) eggs per clutch, laying about one egg each morning. Weasels are the main predator risk posed to chestnut chickadee eggs. The incubation period is about two weeks, and the chicks fledge the nest about three weeks after hatching.

== Population status ==
In the early 20th century, Joseph Grinnell's observations of the chestnut-backed chickadee recorded that the species was locally abundant in large numbers within its coastal forest habitat, but their overall distribution was largely confined because of its dependency on humid coniferous environments. Now, the species is common, but its populations have dropped significantly since 1966. The approximate estimate of the number of breeding chestnut-backed chickadees in the United States and Canada is around 9.7 million. The 2016 Watch List does not list the chestnut-backed chickadee in any form, whereas it is considered a species in the U.S.-Canada Stewardship.

== Gallery ==
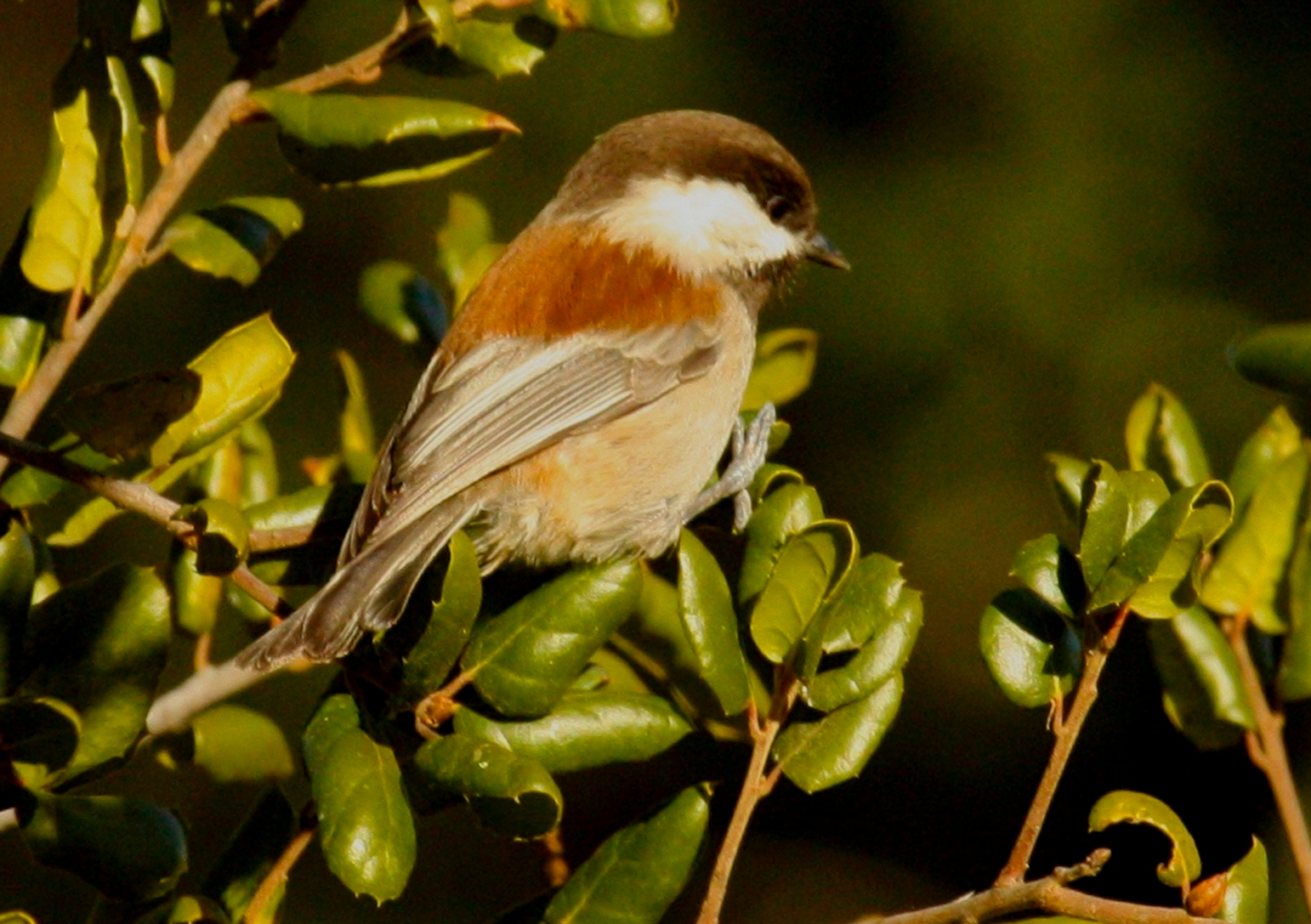
Del Valle, CA

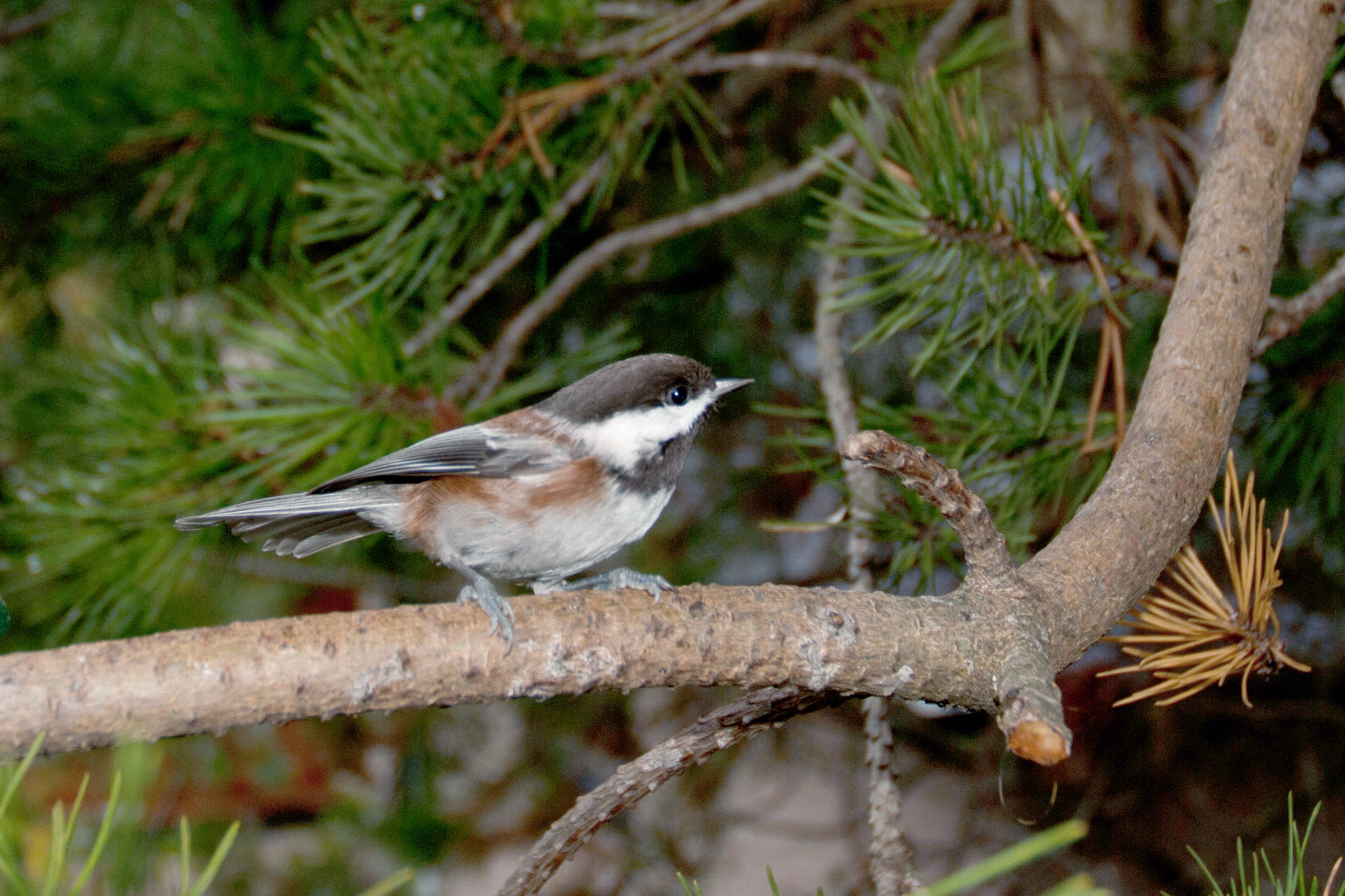
Poecile rufescens rufescens

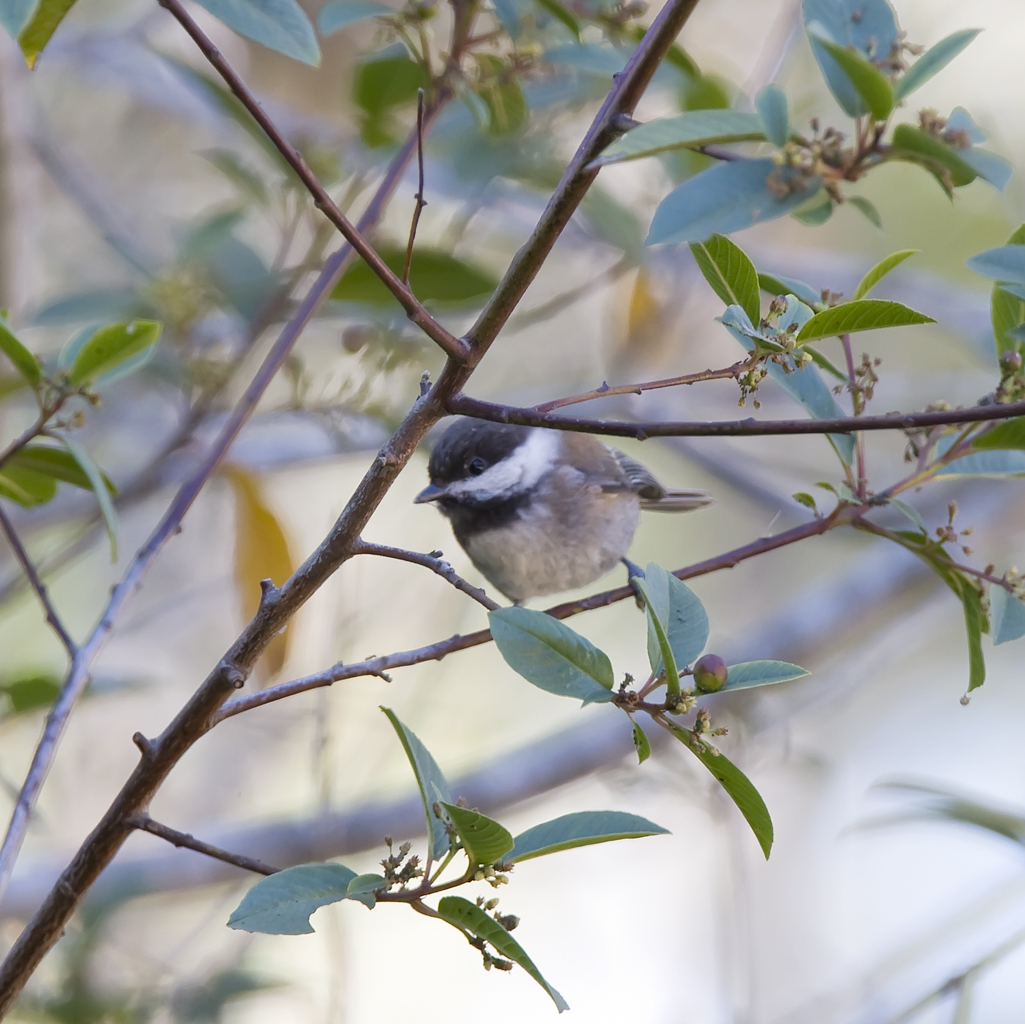
P. r. barlowi
