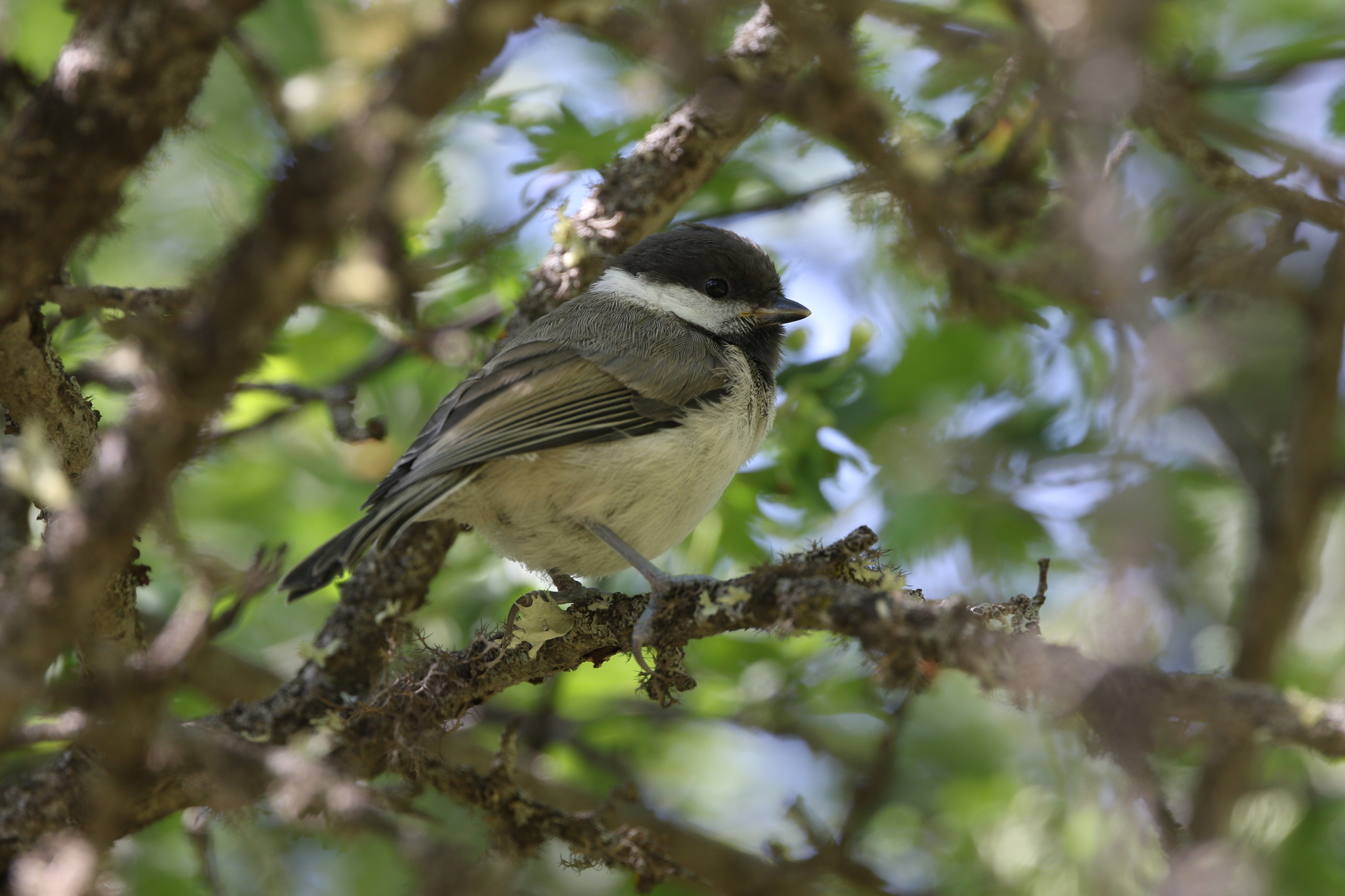

Conservation status
- Least Concern (IUCN 3.1)

Scientific classification
- Kingdom: Animalia
- Phylum: Chordata
- Class: Aves
- Order: Passeriformes
- Family: Paridae
- Genus: Poecile
- Species: P. hyrcanus

Binomial name
- Poecile hyrcanus Zarudny & Loudon, 1905

Synonyms
- Parus hyrcanus

= Caspian tit =

Species of bird

The Caspian tit (Poecile hyrcanus) is a passerine bird in the tit family. It breeds in the deciduous mountain forests with its core population concentrated in the Hyrcanian forests of Iran, just extending into Azerbaijan. It is considered one of the most range-restricted tit species.

The 12.5 cm (4.9 in) long Caspian tit has a dark brown cap and bib, rich brown upperparts and underparts which are pinkish-buff when fresh, but become paler and greyer as the feathers age. The sexes are similar, but juveniles are somewhat duller. The most common call of this generally quiet bird is a thin zsit, but a nasal double note, chev chev, is also given.

Both sexes excavate the nesting hole in a live or a rotten tree. Most nests examined are cups of felted material, such as fur, hair and wood chips, but feathers are sometimes used. The number of eggs varies from five to seven, white with faint reddish spots or blotches. It feeds on caterpillars, insects and seeds, much like other tits.

Molecular phylogenetic studies have shown that the Caspian tit is sister to the willow tit (Poecile montanus).
