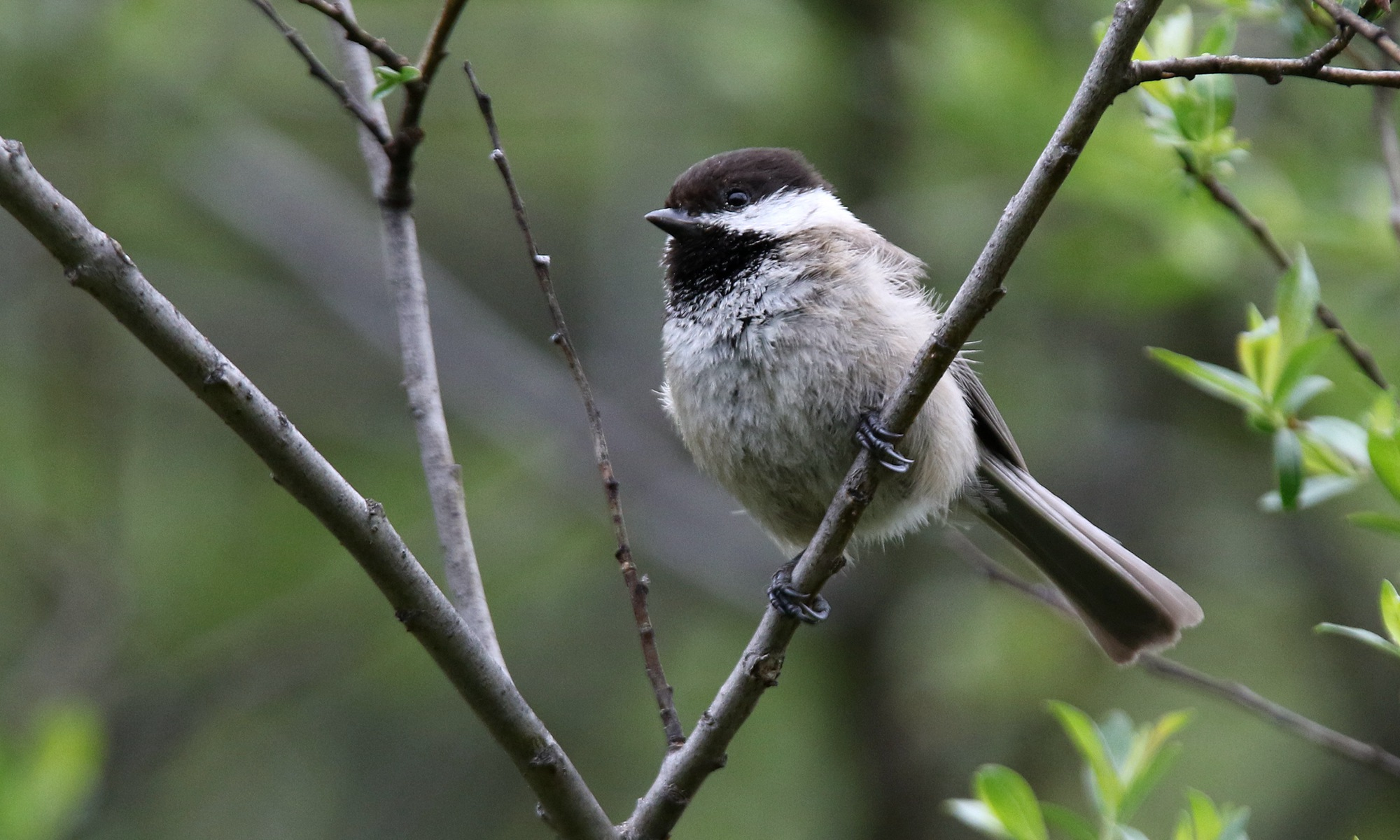

Conservation status
- Least Concern (IUCN 3.1)

Scientific classification
- Kingdom: Animalia
- Phylum: Chordata
- Class: Aves
- Order: Passeriformes
- Family: Paridae
- Genus: Poecile
- Species: P. weigoldicus

Binomial name
- Poecile weigoldicus (Kleinschmidt, 1921)
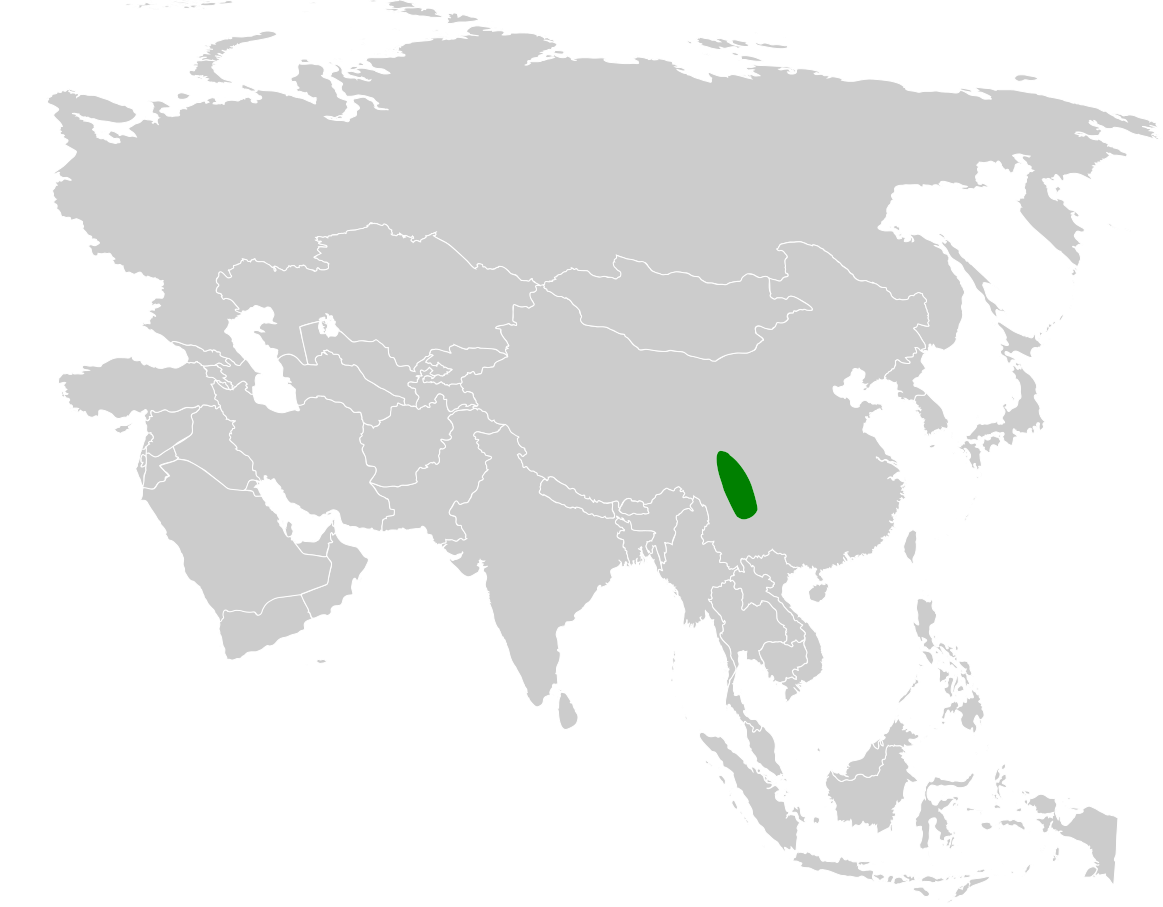
- Sichuan tit distribution

Synonyms
- Parus weigoldicus Kleinschmidt, 1921; Poecile montanus weigoldicus (Kleinschmidt, 1921)

= Sichuan tit =

Species of bird

The Sichuan tit (Poecile weigoldicus) is a species of bird in the tit family Paridae. It is endemic to central China.

This species was formerly treated as a subspecies of the willow tit (Poecile montanus). It was promoted to species status based on a genetic analysis published in 2002. It is monotypic: no subspecies are recognised.

== Distribution and habitat ==
Sichuan tit is found in Sichuan, south-eastern Qinghai, and north-western Yunnan provinces. It occurs in a variety of habitats, such as coniferous, mixed and mature deciduous forests, woodland edge, scrub, and urban parks and gardens at altitudes of 0–4,275 m (0–14,026 ft) above sea level.
