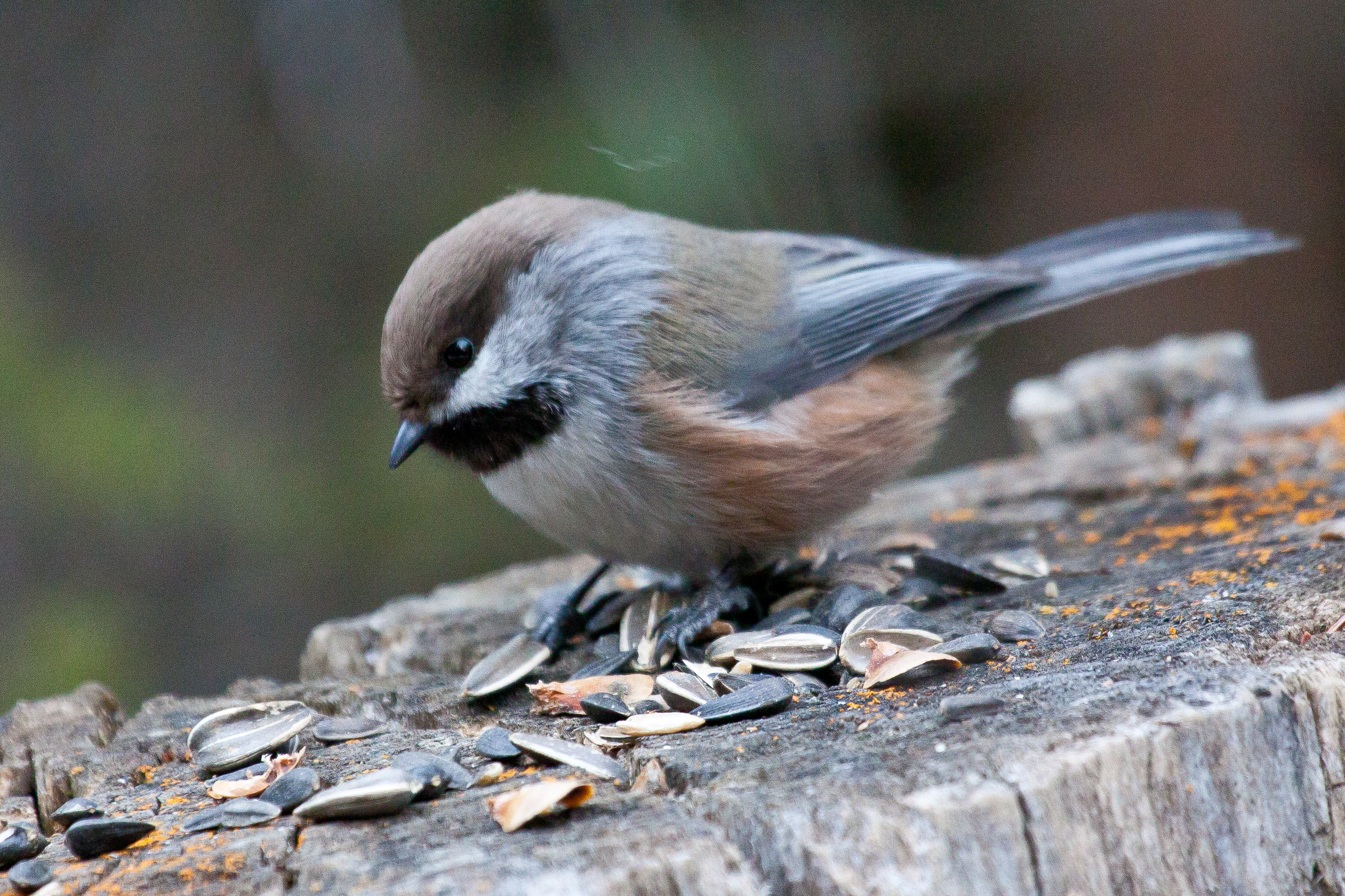

Conservation status
- Least Concern (IUCN 3.1)

Scientific classification
- Kingdom: Animalia
- Phylum: Chordata
- Class: Aves
- Order: Passeriformes
- Family: Paridae
- Genus: Poecile
- Species: P. hudsonicus

Binomial name
- Poecile hudsonicus (Forster, 1772)
- Range of Poecile hudsonicus

Synonyms
- Parus hudsonicus

= Boreal chickadee =

Species of bird

The boreal chickadee (Poecile hudsonicus) is a small passerine songbird in the tit family Paridae. It is found in the boreal forests of Alaska, Canada and the northern United States and remains within this range all year. This bird is known for its high pitched trill patterns used in communication with other birds and food storage habits in preparation for winter months.

== Description ==
Adults are 12.5–14.5 cm (4.9–5.7 in) long with a weight of 7–12.4 g (0.25–0.44 oz). They have grey-brown upperparts with a brown cap and greyish wings and tail; their face is mainly grey with white on the sides. Their underparts are white with brown on the flanks and a black throat. They have a short dark bill, short wings and a long notched tail. Their flight consists of brief gliding patterns followed by fast and bouncy wing beats as they travel through the air.

Standard Measurements
length	130–140 mm (5–5.5 in)
weight	10 g (0.35 oz)
wingspan	210 mm (8.25 in)
wing	63.2–66.2 mm (2.49–2.61 in)
tail	59–65.9 mm (2.32–2.59 in)
culmen	7.6–9.8 mm (0.30–0.39 in)
tarsus	16–17.5 mm (0.63–0.69 in)

== Vocal communications ==
The call is a husky tsee-day-day, as well as a high pitched trill sound, dididididididi a variant on the call which gives chickadees their name. This call is composed of five distinct note-type categories consisting of A, B, C, D and D-hybrid with the beginning and end note both displaying a high frequency pitch. Boreal chickadees use specialized notes within their vocal range to communicate with each other and convey information. Certain notes/calls can be used as a mating tactic or to indicate a bird's rank to neighbouring fertile females in the area. Females have also been known to be more attracted to a male chickadee if he portrays complex and larger song repertoires. Calls can also be used in territory defence or to warn others of an invader that come to close to a nesting female. Cross species comparisons can be made by comparing the vocal similarities between other species of chickadees.

== Breeding/nesting behaviour ==
Their breeding habitat is coniferous woods in Canada, Alaska, and the northernmost portions of the contiguous United States. They generally breed from early May to the end of August and remain within their breeding range throughout the year, but sometimes move south in winter. When a female chickadee finds a high quality male to mate with this provides direct and indirect benefits such as exceptional parental care and high quality genes. The pair remains together year round and may mate for life. Winter movements south of their range, however, appear to have become increasingly rare. Large bodies of water and mountain ranges may restrict dispersal of the boreal chickadee into places such as the Vancouver Islands and Haida Gwaii. They nest in a hole in a tree; the pair excavates the nest, using a natural cavity or sometimes an old woodpecker nest. This nest can be made of hair, fur or dead plants. Five to seven eggs are laid, white with fine reddish-brown spotting. Eggs are laid between May and July and hatch within 13–16 days. After the eggs have hatched it takes another 16–18 days for the birds to fully develop wings large enough to attempt flight.

== Foraging behaviour ==
These birds forage on conifer branches or probe into the bark, gleaning insects and foraging for conifer seeds, which may be stored in preparation for winter months. Boreal chickadees are known to store large amounts of food in different trees, each location containing several food items. Food is usually stored in the mid-region of trees at a lower level than at which they foraged. They generally forage in black spruce, white spruce and tamarack trees which minimizes competition with black-capped chickadees who forage in more deciduous and mixed forests. Boreal chickadees often forage in small flocks including other small birds, especially in winter.

== Predators ==
With the advantage of being a bird capable of flight, the boreal chickadee has few predators. These consist of larger birds such as small owls, hawks and shrikes. Predators of eggs and baby boreal chickadees generally consist of tree climbing animals such as squirrels, chipmunks, mice, bears and rats.

== Threats ==
The largest threat that is placed on boreal chickadees is clearcutting and logging that occurs in the boreal forest regions. These practices are causing dramatic reductions in mature forests and rapidly modifying the habitat of boreal chickadees.

== Taxonomy ==
The species was formerly placed in the genus Parus with most other tits, but mtDNA cytochrome b sequence data and morphology suggest that separating Poecile more adequately expresses these birds' relationships. Molecular phylogenetic studies have shown that the boreal chickadee is sister to the chestnut-backed chickadee (Poecile rufescens).
