= Mikhail Berezovsky =

Russian Empire ornithologist and ethnologist

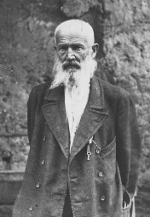

Mikhail Mikhailovich Berezovsky (1848 - 5 April 1912) was a Russian ornithologist and ethnologist who explored central Asia and other region as part of Russian Empire expeditions. He made numerous collections of natural history and anthropological interest. A number of species described from his collections have been named after him.

Berezovsky was born in a family of nobility, he was educated at the 2nd St. Petersburg Gymnasium before joining the technical institute. Being associated with the circle of Sergey Nechayev led to his arrest in December 1871 but he was not prosecuted due to lack of evidence. He went to study natural sciences at St. Petersburg and then participated in expeditions with G.N. Potanin and V.L. Bianchi into parts of Mongolia (1876–77), Tibet and China (1884-86, 92–93), largely involved in natural history collections. He also documented his travels, sketching monuments, and photographing during expeditions. Along with Bianchi, he described the nightingale species Luscinia obscura in 1891. In 1895 he received the Przewalski award for his research in China. He also made collections of Buddhist literature in Sanskrit and other languages.

A number of taxa have been named after him including Ithaginis cruentus berezowskii, Anthus hodgsoni berezowskii, Cyanistes flavipectus berezowskii, Moschus berezovskii, Paeonia berezowskii, Pterostichus berezowskii , and Anabaena berezowskii.
