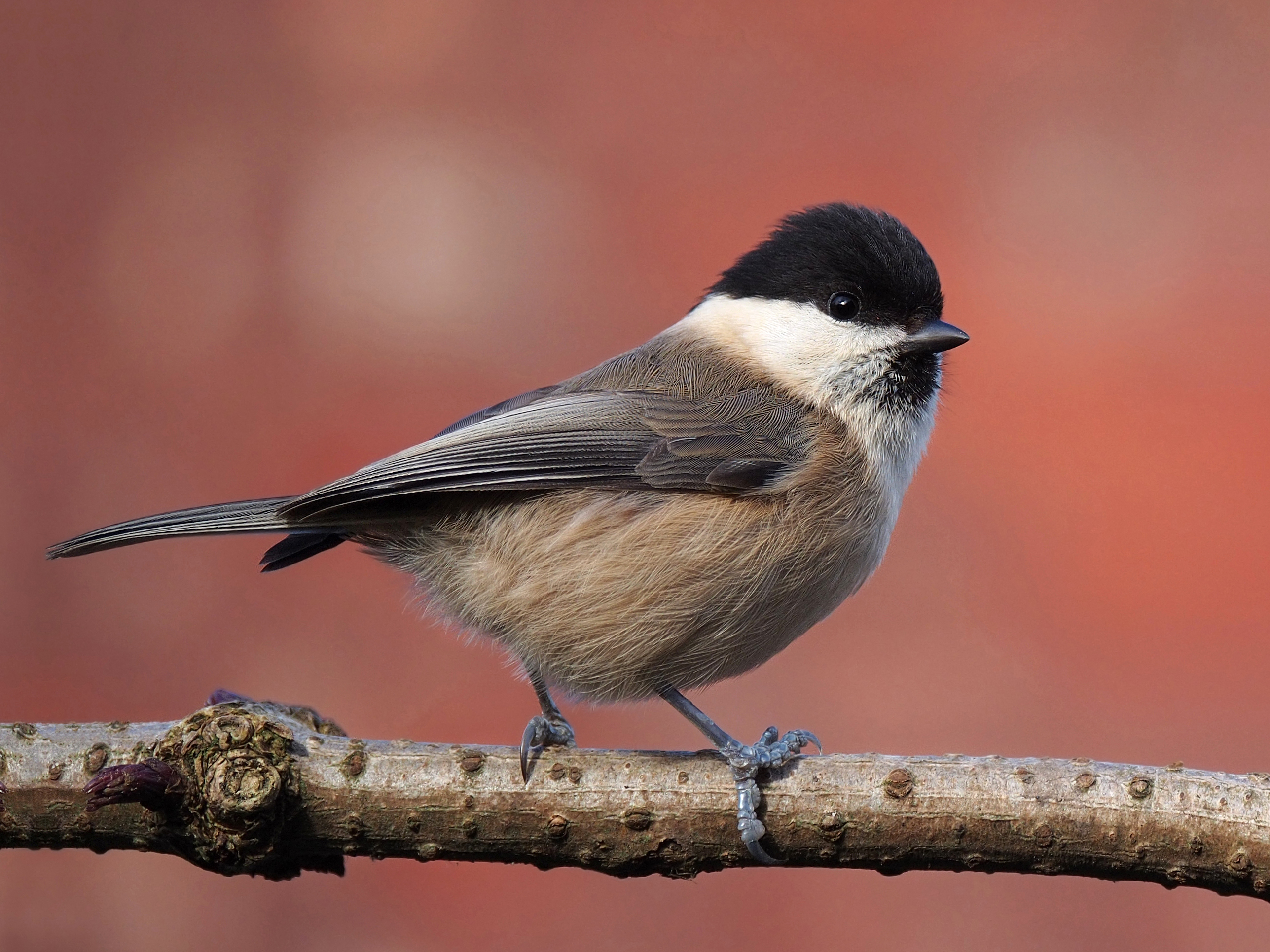
- Subspecies kleinschmidti, Wigan, England

Conservation status
- Least Concern (IUCN 3.1)

Scientific classification
- Kingdom: Animalia
- Phylum: Chordata
- Class: Aves
- Order: Passeriformes
- Family: Paridae
- Genus: Poecile
- Species: P. montanus

Binomial name
- Poecile montanus (Conrad von Baldenstein, 1827)
- Range of Poecile montanus Resident

Synonyms
- Parus montanus

Audio
- Song recorded near Bryansk, Russia

= Willow tit =

Species of passerine bird in the tit family Paridae

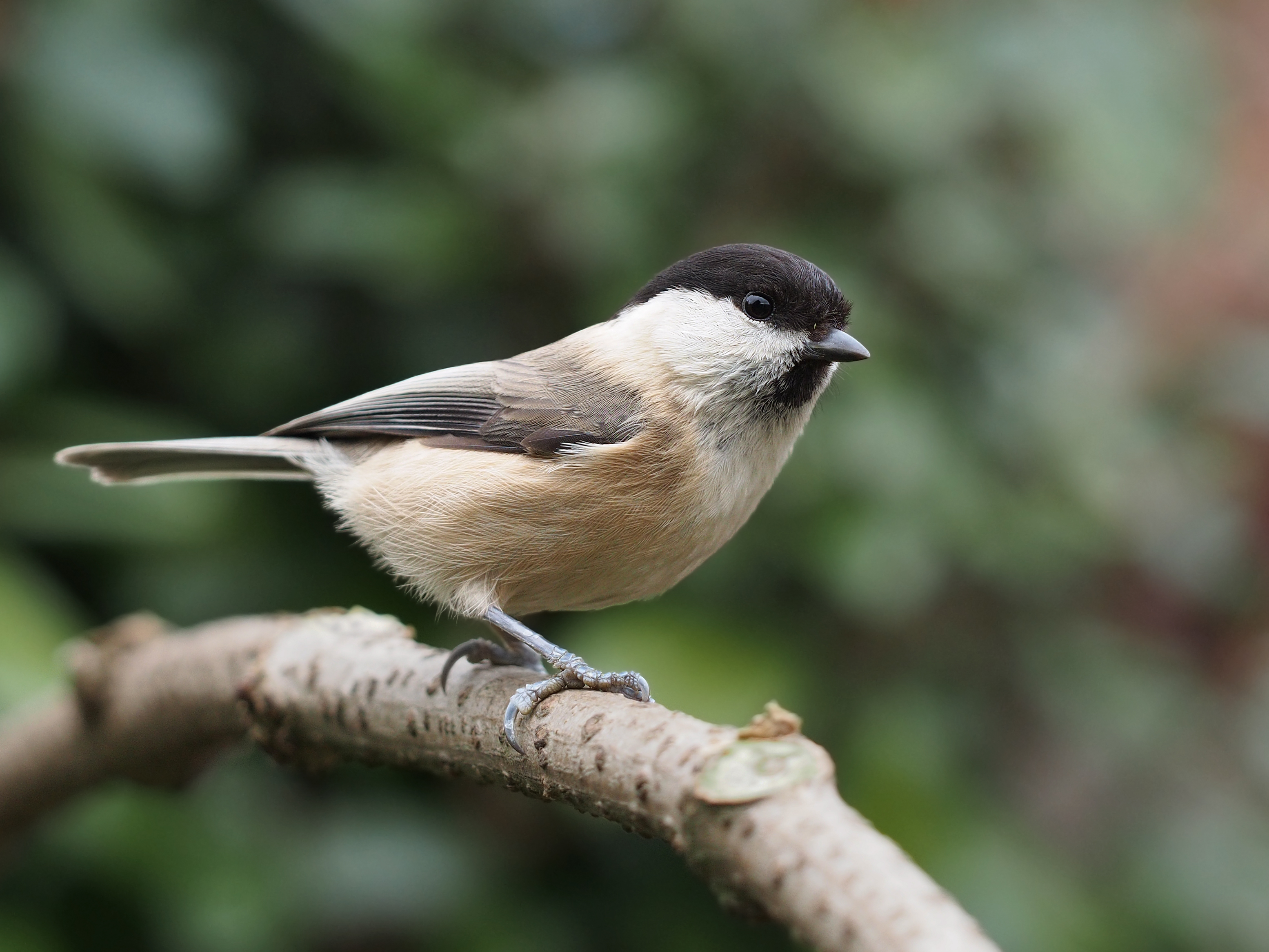
In the UK

The willow tit (Poecile montanus) is a passerine bird in the tit family, Paridae. It is a widespread and common resident breeder throughout temperate and subarctic Europe and across the Palearctic. The plumage is grey-brown and off-white with a black cap and bib. It is more of a conifer specialist than the closely related marsh tit, which explains its breeding much farther north. It is resident, and most birds do not migrate.

== Taxonomy ==
The willow tit was described in 1827 by the Swiss naturalist Thomas Conrad von Baldenstein under the trinomial name Parus cinereus montanus. The type locality is the mountain forests in the Canton of Grisons, Switzerland. The willow tit is now placed in the genus Poecile that was erected by the German naturalist Johann Jakob Kaup in 1829. The genus name, Poecile, is the Ancient Greek name for a now unidentifiable small bird, and the specific montanus is Latin for "of the mountains".

Poecile was at one time treated as a subgenus within the genus Parus but molecular taxonomic analysis, using both nuclear and mitochondrial genes, supports Poecile as a distinct clade. Within Poecile, most of the Old World species (including the willow tit) form a separate clade from the New World chickadees. The taxonomic analysis has shown that the willow tit is sister to the Caspian tit (Poecile hyrcanus).

There are 14 recognised subspecies:

- P. m. kleinschmidti (Hellmayr, 1900) – Britain
- P. m. rhenanus (Kleinschmidt, 1900) – northwest France to west Germany, north Switzerland and north Italy
- P. m. montanus (Conrad von Baldenstein, 1827) – southeast France to Romania, Bulgaria and Greece
- P. m. salicarius (Brehm, CL, 1831) – Germany and west Poland to northeast Switzerland and Austria
- P. m. borealis (de Sélys-Longchamps, 1843) – Scandinavia south to Ukraine
- P. m. uralensis (Grote, 1927) – southeast European Russia, west Siberia and Kazakhstan
- P. m. baicalensis Swinhoe, 1871 – central east, east Siberia, north Mongolia, north China and north Korea
- P. m. anadyrensis (Belopolski, 1932) – northeast Siberia
- P. m. kamtschatkensis Bonaparte, 1850 – Kamchatka Peninsula and north Kuril Islands
- P. m. sachalinensis (Lönnberg, 1908) – Sakhalin and south Kuril Islands
- P. m. restrictus (Hellmayr, 1900) – Japan
- P. m. songarus (Severtsov, 1873) – southeast Kazakhstan to Kyrgyzstan and northwest China
- P. m. affinis Przevalski, 1876 – central north China
- P. m. stoetzneri (Kleinschmidt, 1921) – northeast China

The Sichuan tit (Poecile weigoldicus) was formerly treated as a subspecies of the willow tit. It was promoted to species status based on a 2002 phylogenetic analysis that compared DNA sequences from the mitochondrial cytochrome-b gene. The single locus results were later confirmed by a larger multi-locus analysis published in 2017.

== Description ==
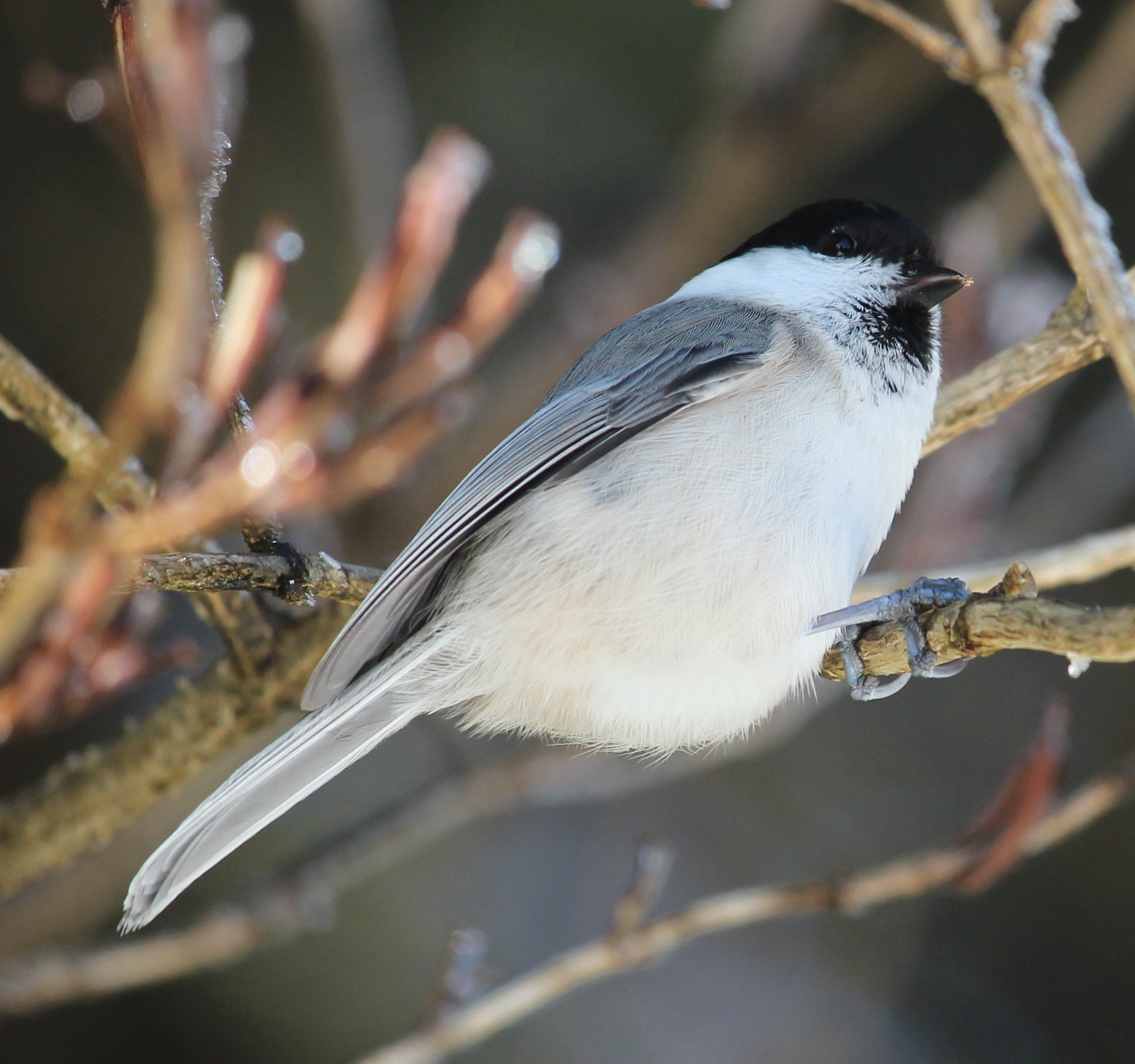
Subspecies Poecile montanus restrictus in Japan

The willow tit is 11.5 cm (4.5 in) in length, has a wingspan of 17–20.5 cm (6.7–8.1 in) and weighs around 11 g (0.39 oz). It has a large head, a thin bill, a long dull black cap that descends to the mantle and a black bib. The sides of the face are white, the back is grey-brown and the underparts are buff. The sexes are similar in appearance.

In the east of its range it is much paler than marsh tit, but as one goes west the various races become increasingly similar, so much so that it was not recognised as a breeding bird in Great Britain until the end of the 19th century, despite being widespread.

The willow tit is distinguished from the marsh tit by a sooty brown instead of a glossy blue black cap; the general colour is otherwise similar, though the under parts are more buff and the flanks distinctly more rufous; the pale buff edgings to the secondaries form a light patch on the closed wing. The feathers of the crown and the black bib under the bill are longer, but this is not an easily noticed character.

The commonest call is a nasal zee, zee, zee, but the notes of the bird evidently vary considerably. Occasionally a double note, ipsee, ipsee, is repeated four or five times.

== Behaviour and ecology ==
=== Breeding ===
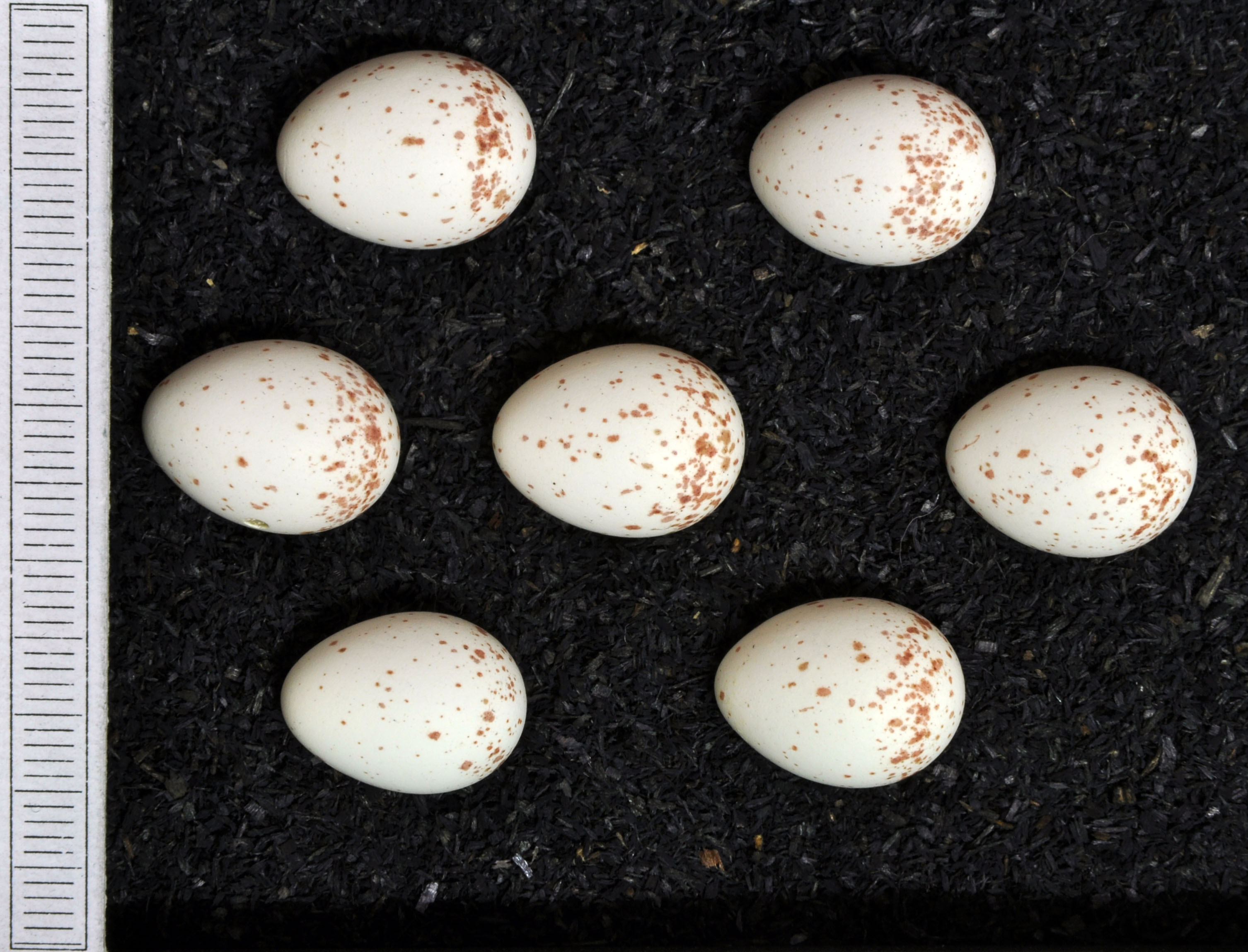
Eggs, collection Museum Wiesbaden, Germany

The willow tit excavates its own nesting hole, even piercing hard bark; this is usually in a rotten stump or in a tree, more or less decayed. Most nests are cups of felted material, such as fur, hair and wood chips, but feathers are sometimes used. The eggs are laid daily. The clutch is typically between six and nine eggs. The eggs have a white background and are marked with red-brown speckles and spots which are often concentrated at the broader end. They measure around 15.8 mm × 12.3 mm (0.62 in × 0.48 in) and weigh 1.2 g (0.042 oz). The eggs are incubated by the female alone and hatch after 13–15 days. The chicks are then cared for and fed by both parents but only the female broods the young. The nestlings fledge after 17–20 days. Only a single brood is raised each season.

In a study using ring-recovery data carried out in northern Finland, the survival rate for juveniles for their first year was 0.58, and the subsequent adult annual survival rate was 0.64. For birds that survive the first year the typical lifespan is thus only three years. The maximum recorded age is 11 years; this has been recorded for a bird in Finland and for another near Nottingham in England.

=== Food and feeding ===
Birds feed on insects, caterpillars, and seeds, much like other tits. This species is parasitised by the moorhen flea, Dasypsyllus gallinulae.

== Status ==
The willow tit has an extremely large range with an estimated population of between 175 and 253 million mature individuals. This large population appears to be slowly decreasing but the decline is not sufficiently rapid to approach the threshold of vulnerability. The species is therefore classed as of least-concern by the International Union for Conservation of Nature. In contrast, the number in the United Kingdom declined by 83% between 1995 and 2017. There was also a contraction in the range. The rapid decline is believed be due to three factors: habitat loss, competition for nest holes by other tits particularly blue tits, and nest predation by the great spotted woodpecker. Over the same period, the number of great spotted woodpeckers increased fourfold.

== Sources ==
- Cramp, Stanley; Perrins, C.M., eds. (1993). "Parus montanus Willow Tit". Handbook of the Birds of Europe the Middle East and North Africa. The Birds of the Western Palearctic. Vol. VII: Flycatchers to Strikes. Oxford: Oxford University Press. pp. 168–186. ISBN 978-0-19-857510-8.
