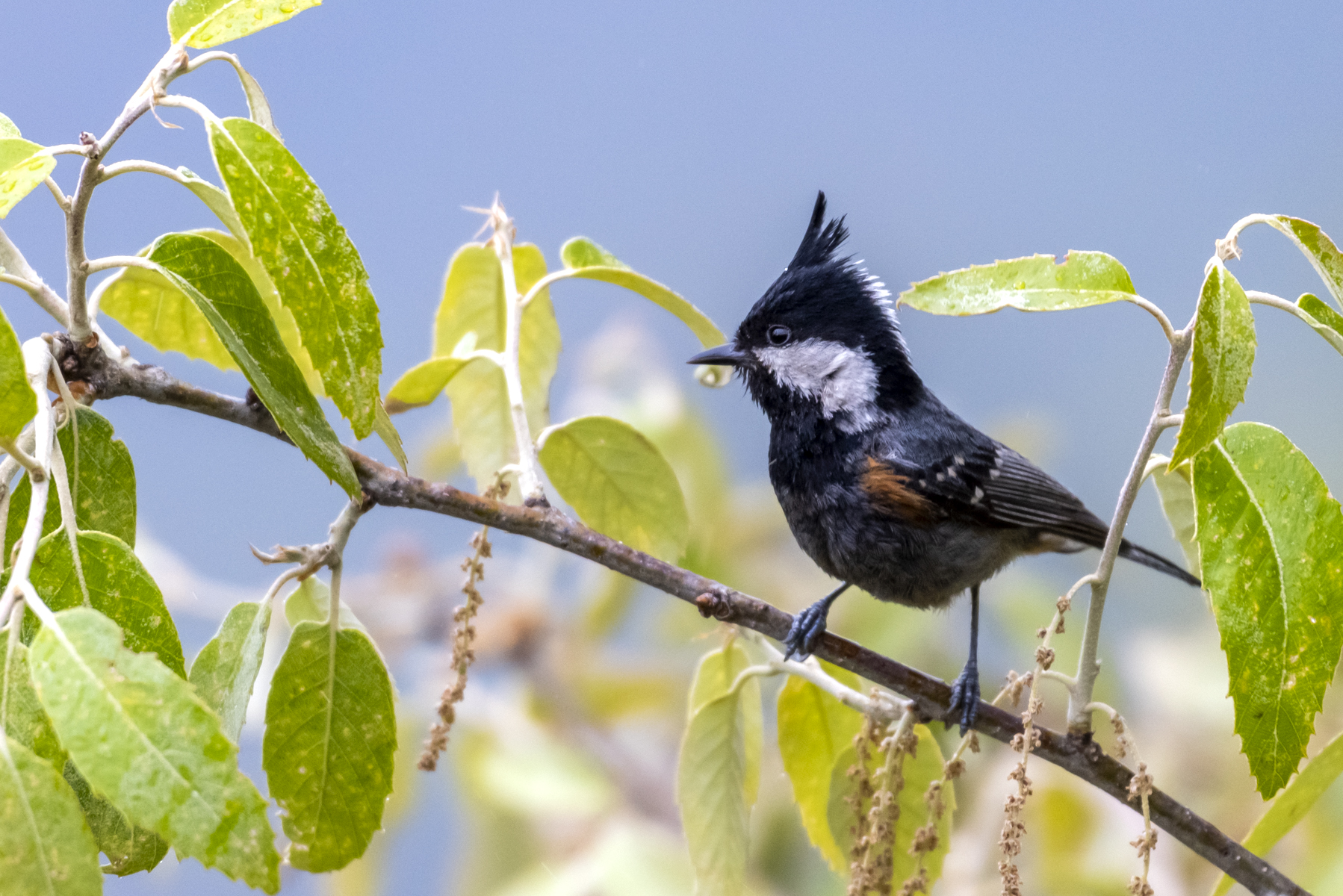
- In Binser - Almora District of Uttrakhand, India

Scientific classification
- Kingdom: Animalia
- Phylum: Chordata
- Class: Aves
- Order: Passeriformes
- Family: Paridae
- Genus: Periparus
- Species: P. ater
- Subspecies: P. a. melanolophus

Trinomial name
- Periparus ater melanolophus Vigors, 1831

Synonyms
- Periparus melanolophus; Parus melanolophus

= Black-crested tit =

Subspecies of bird

The black-crested tit (Periparus ater melanolophus), also known as the spot-winged tit, is a bird in the family Paridae. It was formerly considered a distinct species, but is now considered a subspecies of the coal tit.

== Distribution and habitat ==
It is found in boreal forests and temperate forests in the northern parts of the Indian subcontinent, in the Hindu Kush, Karakorum, and western Himalaya ranges, from northeastern Afghanistan, through northern Pakistan and northwestern India to western Nepal.

== Taxonomy ==
The black-crested tit was formerly considered its own species closely related to the coal tit, but the two are now considered conspecific based on similar calls and behaviour, along with paraphyly of the traditional coal tit if black-crested tit is excluded. It intergrades with another coal tit subspecies P. a. aemodius in west-central Nepal.

== Gallery ==
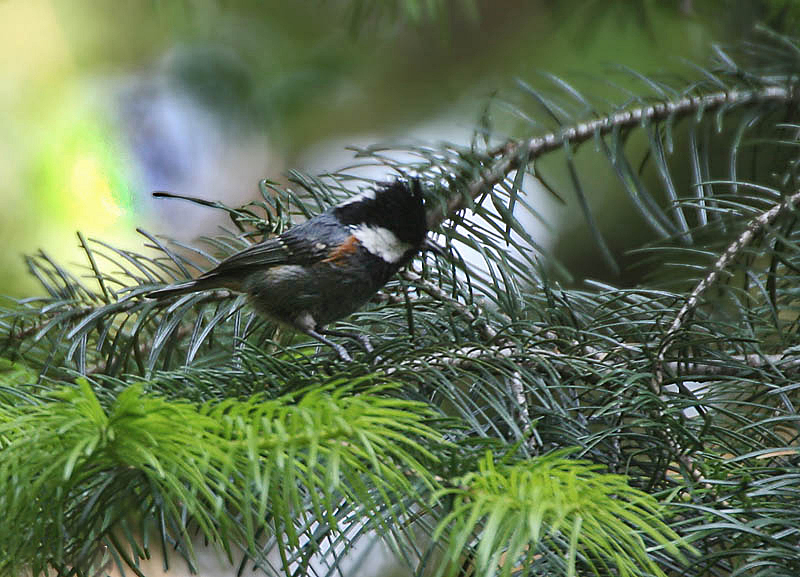
in Kullu - Manali District of Himachal Pradesh, India

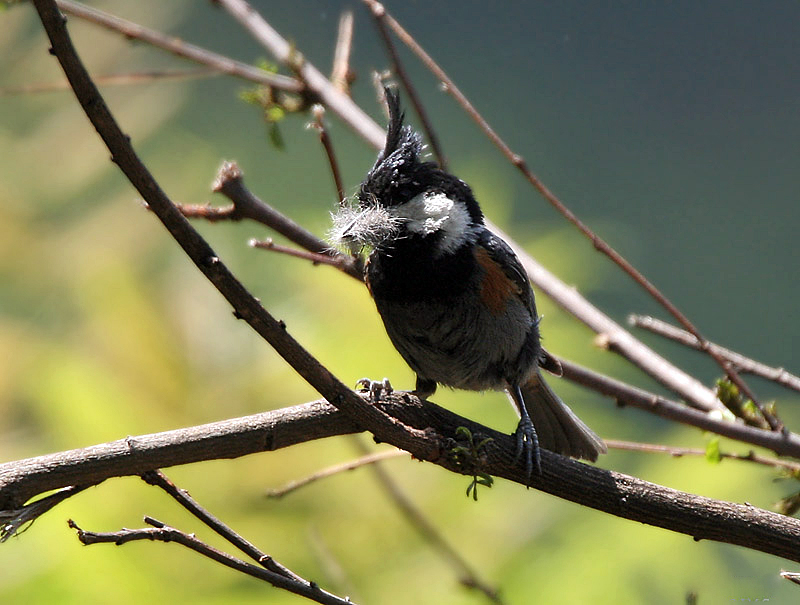
carrying nesting material in Kullu - Manali District of Himachal Pradesh, India

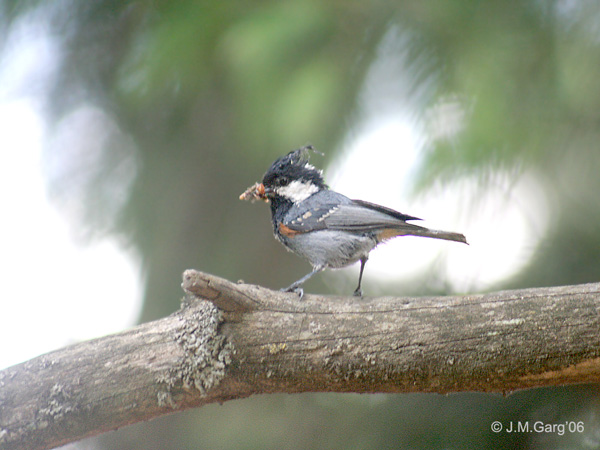
carrying feed for chicks in Kullu - Manali District of Himachal Pradesh, India
