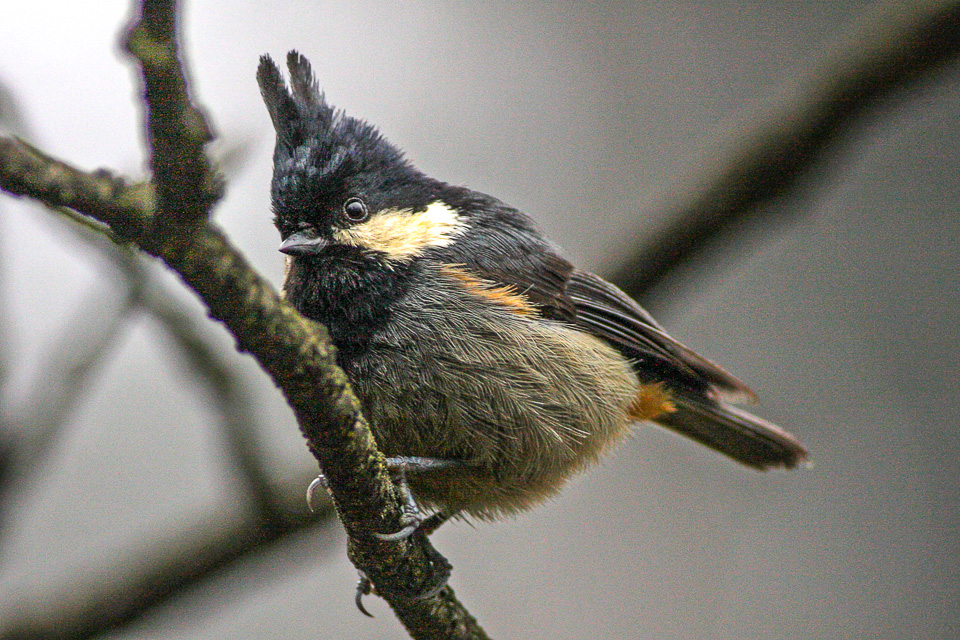

Conservation status
- Least Concern (IUCN 3.1)

Scientific classification
- Kingdom: Animalia
- Phylum: Chordata
- Class: Aves
- Order: Passeriformes
- Family: Paridae
- Genus: Periparus
- Species: P. rubidiventris

Binomial name
- Periparus rubidiventris (Blyth, 1847)
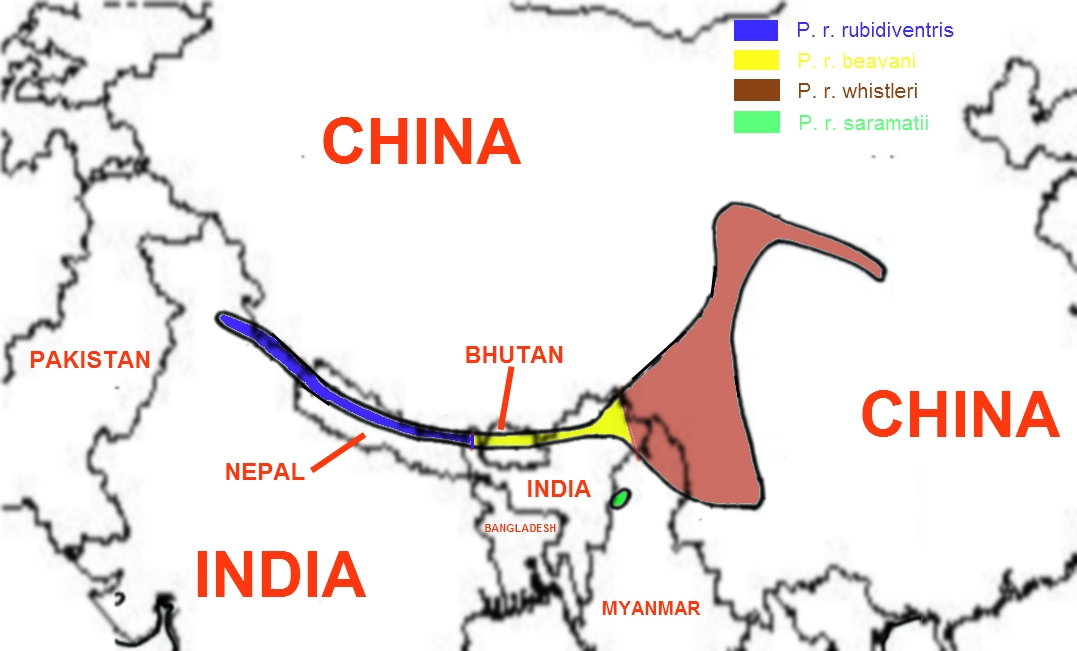
- Global range Blue = rubidiventris Yellow = beavani Red = whistleri Green = saramatii

Synonyms
- Parus rubidiventris Blyth, 1847; Parus rufonuchalis beavani (Jerdon, 1863)

= Rufous-vented tit =

Species of bird

The rufous-vented tit (Periparus rubidiventris) is an Asian songbird species in the tit and chickadee family (Paridae). Some of its subspecies were formerly assigned to its western relative the rufous-naped tit (P. rufonuchalis), or these two were considered entirely conspecific.

== Taxonomy ==
The tit was formerly placed in the genus Parus. The four subspecies are:

- Periparus rubidiventris rubidiventris – S rim of Himalayas from NW to NE India and N Nepal.
- Periparus rubidiventris beavani (Jerdon, 1863) – Beavan's rufous-vented tit – S rim of Himalayas in NE India and Bhutan.
- Periparus rubidiventris whistleri – SE rim of Himalayas in SW China and adjacent N Myanmar and extreme NE India. Sometimes included in beavani.
- Periparus rubidiventris saramatii – Very localised in NW Myanmar.

== Distribution and habitat ==
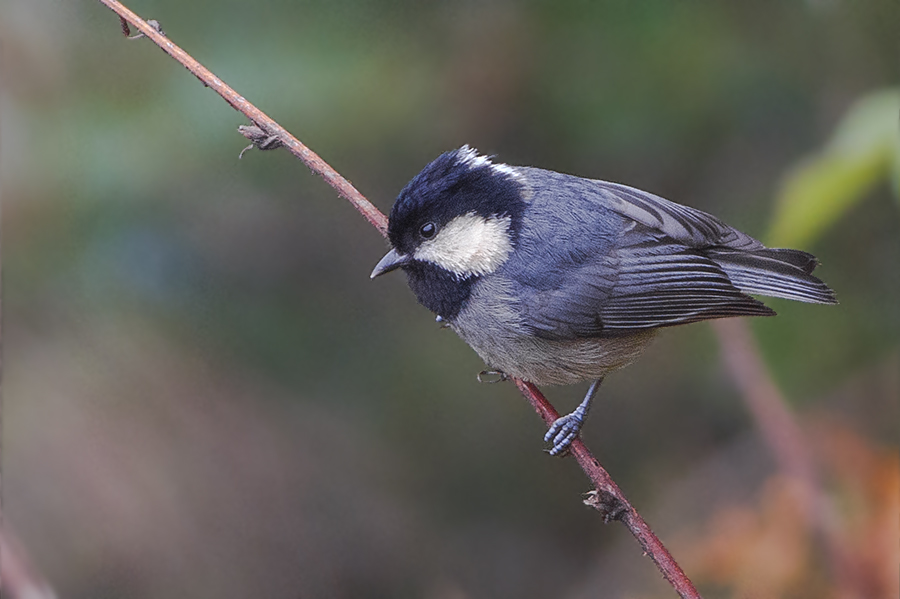
From Lungthu, Pangolakha WLS in East Sikkim, India.

This tit is a native of the western Himalayas, but has a very large range, occurring in parts of Bhutan, China, Pakistan, India, Myanmar and Nepal. Its natural habitats are boreal forests and temperate forests. In Bhutan for example, P. r. beavani is a rather common all-year resident in moist Bhutan fir (Abies densa) forests, between approximately 3,000 and 4,000 meters ASL. Widespread and by no means rare, it is not considered a threatened species by the IUCN.
