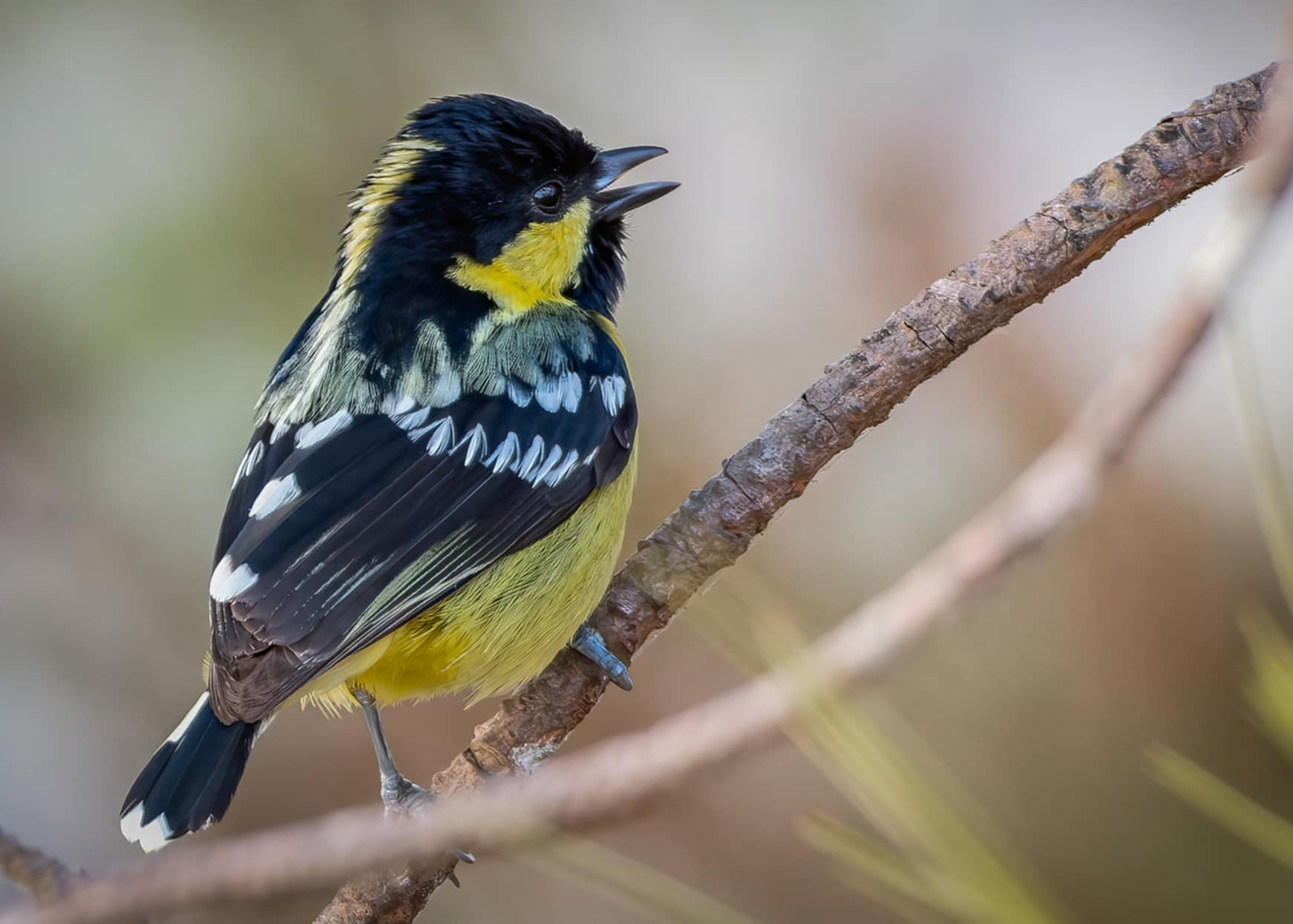
- Male ssp elegans

Conservation status
- Least Concern (IUCN 3.1)

Scientific classification
- Kingdom: Animalia
- Phylum: Chordata
- Class: Aves
- Order: Passeriformes
- Family: Paridae
- Genus: Periparus
- Species: P. elegans

Binomial name
- Periparus elegans (Lesson, 1831)
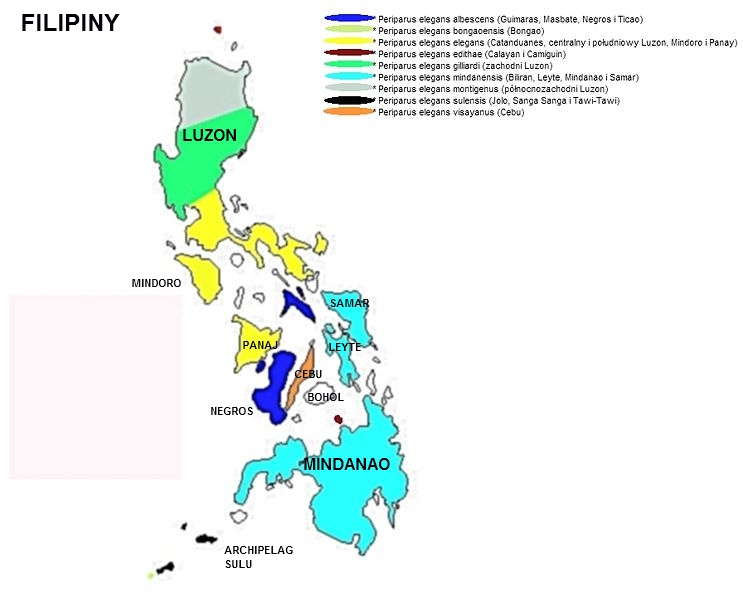
- Range of Periparus in The Philippines

Synonyms
- Parus elegans; Pardaliparus elegans

= Elegant tit =

Species of bird

The elegant tit (Periparus elegans) is a species of bird in the tit family Paridae endemic to the Philippines. Its natural habitat is tropical moist lowland forests and tropical moist montane forests.

== Description and taxonomy ==
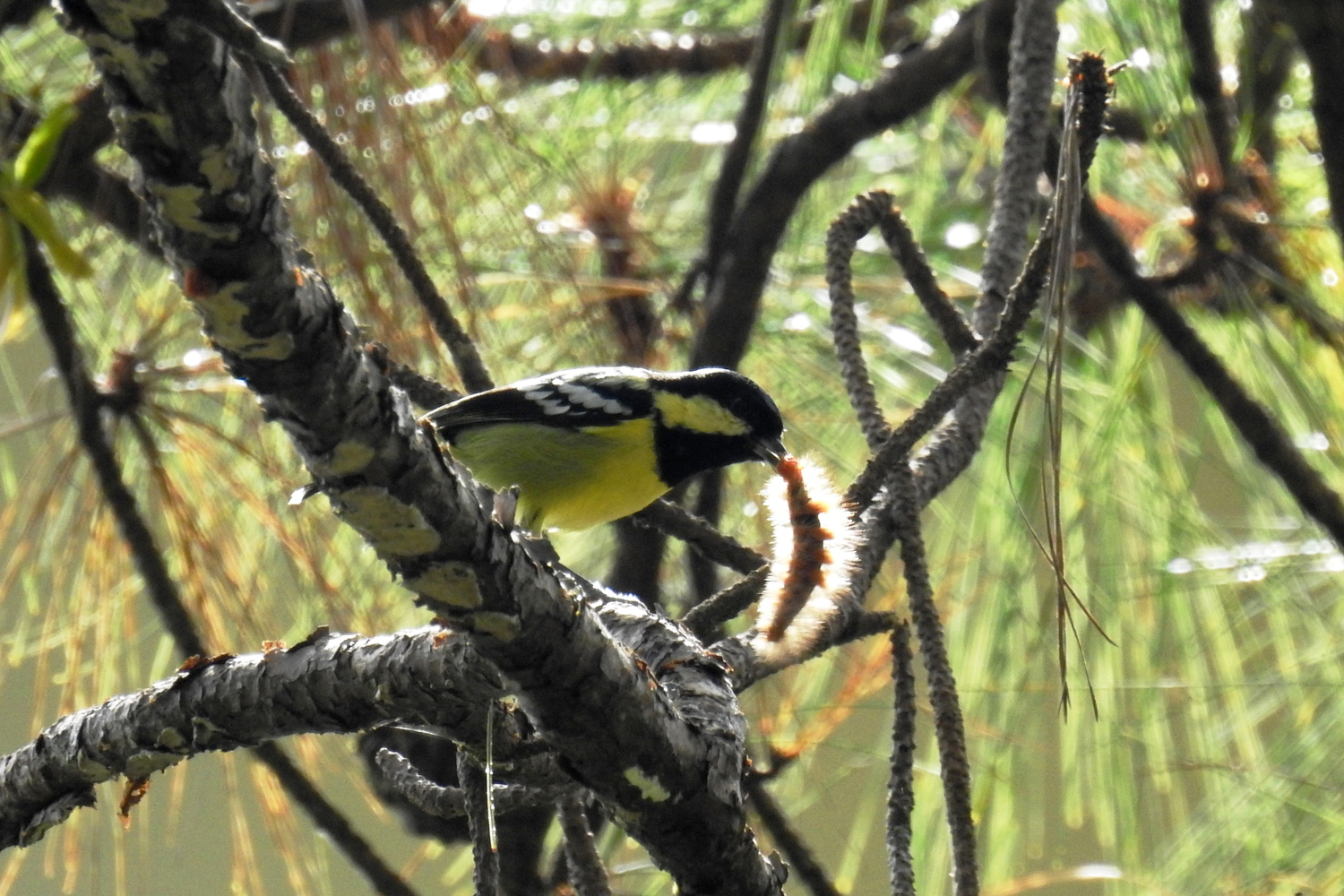
ssp. montigenus feeding on a Tussock moth caterpillar in Baguio, Philippines

Small, sexes similar, with 9 races differing by shading and the amount and location of the white or yellow spotting in the wings and black; male top of head, throat, and upper breast glossy blue black; nape black with yellow spot; mantle black with white spots; lower back yellowish grey; tail black feathers edged white on basal 1/2 and second; primaries edged white; face, lower breast, and belly yellow. Female is duller. imm resembles ad; has yellowish throat and blackish moustachial streaks. Bill black sometimes with gray at base in ad, yellowish to yellow orange with top and bottom horn in inn; eye dark brown; legs gray.

The species was formerly included in the much larger genus Parus but was moved to Pardaliparus and then to Periparus when Parus was split into several resurrected genera following the publication of a detailed molecular phylogenetic analysis in 2013.

=== Subspecies ===
Nine subspecies are recognized:

- P. e. edithae (McGregor, RC, 1907) – northern Philippines (Calayan and Camiguin Norte)
- P. e. montigenus (Hachisuka, M, 1930) – northern Philippines (northwestern Luzon)
- P. e. gilliardi (Parkes, KC, 1958) – northern Philippines (Bataan Peninsula of central Luzon)
- P. e. elegans (Lesson, RP, 1831) – northern Philippines (central and southern Luzon, Panay, Mindoro, and Catanduanes)
- P. e. visayanus (Hachisuka, M, 1930) – central Philippines (Cebu)
- P. e. albescens (McGregor, RC, 1907) – central Philippines (Guimaras, Masbate, Negros, and Ticao)
- P. e. mindanensis (Mearns, EA, 1905) – east-central and southern Philippines (Samar, Leyte, Biliran, and Mindanao)
- P. e. suluensis (Mearns, EA, 1916) – Sulu Archipelago (Jolo, Tawitawi, and Sanga-Sanga)
- P. e. bongaoensis (Parkes, KC, 1958) – Bongao Island (Sulu Archipelago)

== Behavior and ecology ==
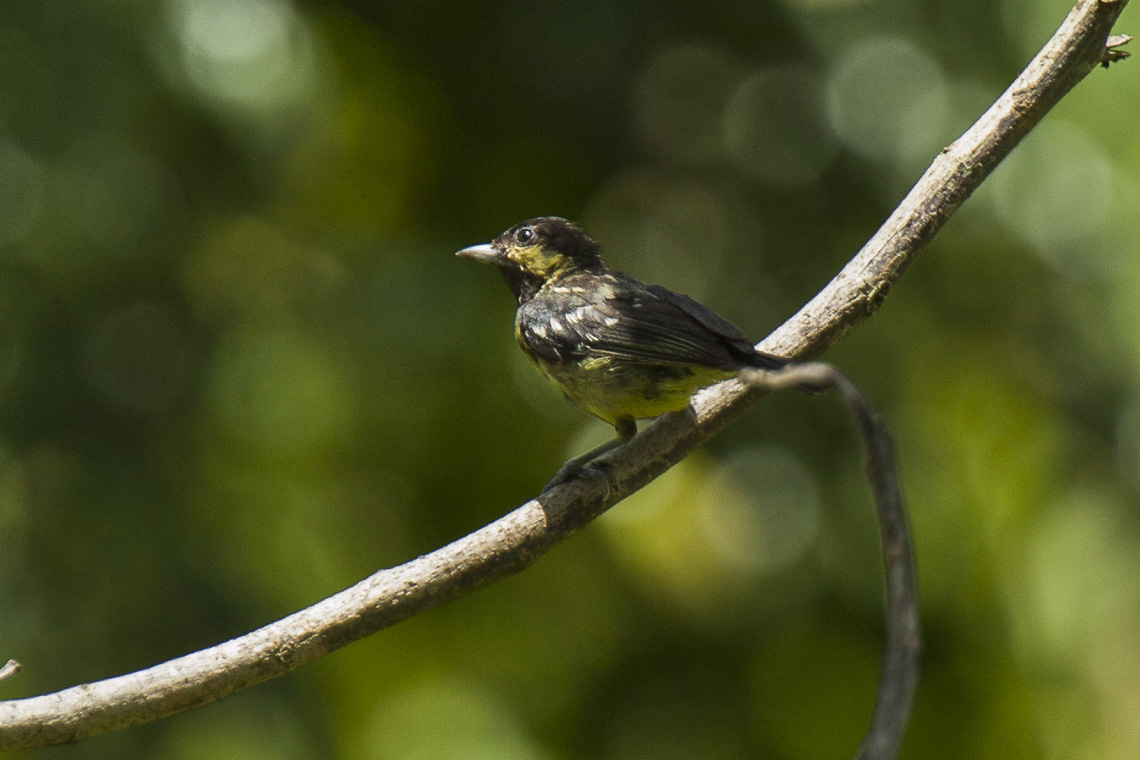
Juvenile

Diet is not well known but includes insects, seeds and fruit. It is usually seen in pairs, small groups and mixed-species flocks which include birds such as white-eyes, sunbirds, sulphur-billed nuthatches, leaf warblers and flowerpeckers.

Breeding is also poorly known. It is believed to breed almost year-round, as adults have been collected in breeding condition with enlarged gonads from January to June and observed carrying nesting material from March to April, and juveniles have been seen from March to November. Nests consist of moss placed in holes in a hollow tree.

== Habitat and conservation ==
It is endemic to the Philippines, ranging across most of the islands. Its natural habitats are tropical moist lowland forest and tropical moist montane forest as high as 2,480 meters above sea level.

It is assessed as a Least-concern species by the International Union for Conservation of Nature as it is fairly common in its range and tolerant of disturbed habitat.
