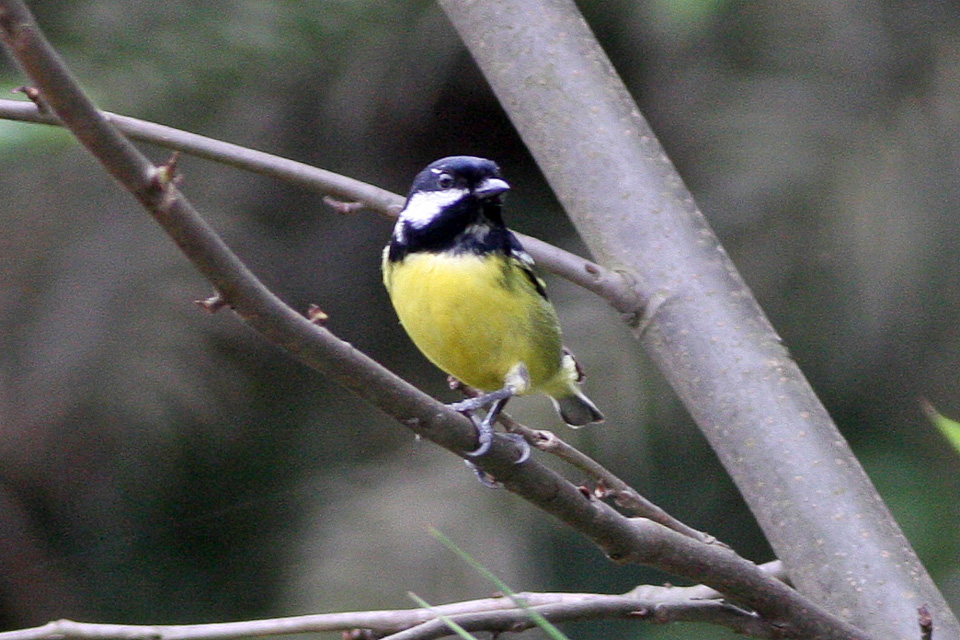

Conservation status
- Least Concern (IUCN 3.1)

Scientific classification
- Kingdom: Animalia
- Phylum: Chordata
- Class: Aves
- Order: Passeriformes
- Family: Paridae
- Genus: Periparus
- Species: P. venustulus

Binomial name
- Periparus venustulus (R. Swinhoe, 1870)
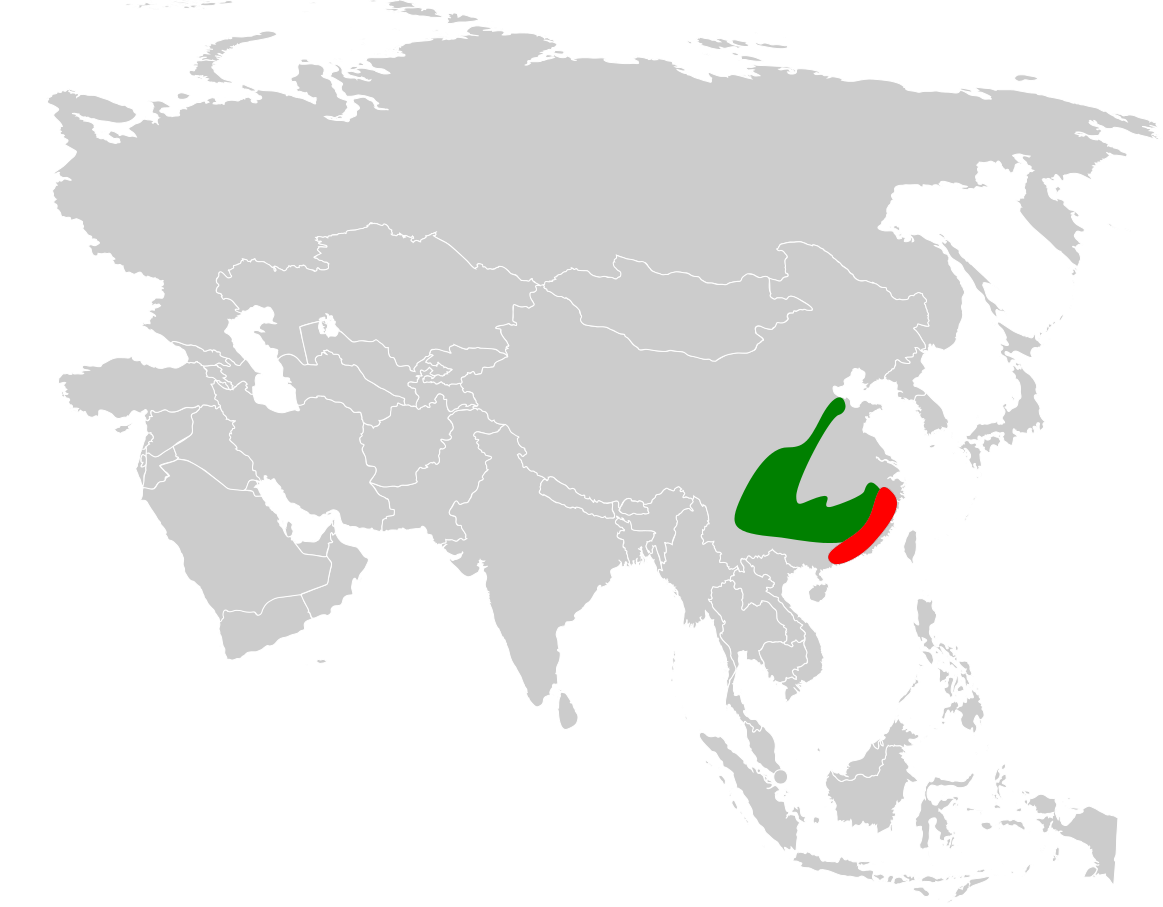
- Range of Pardaliparus venustulus

Synonyms
- Parus venustulus R. Swinhoe, 1870; Pardaliparus venustulus

= Yellow-bellied tit =

Species of bird

The yellow-bellied tit (Periparus venustulus) is a bird in the family Paridae. The species was first described by Robert Swinhoe in 1870.

It is endemic to China. Its natural habitats are temperate forest and subtropical or tropical moist lowland forest below 2000 meters of altitude. It is also present in urban green spaces.

Male yellow- bellied tits are very territorial, but they have a mutual respect for their neighbors. This is called the "dear- enemy" effect, since the birds respect each other's territory and want to maintain friendships.

Individuals tend to demonstrate a preference for one leg or the other ("footedness").
