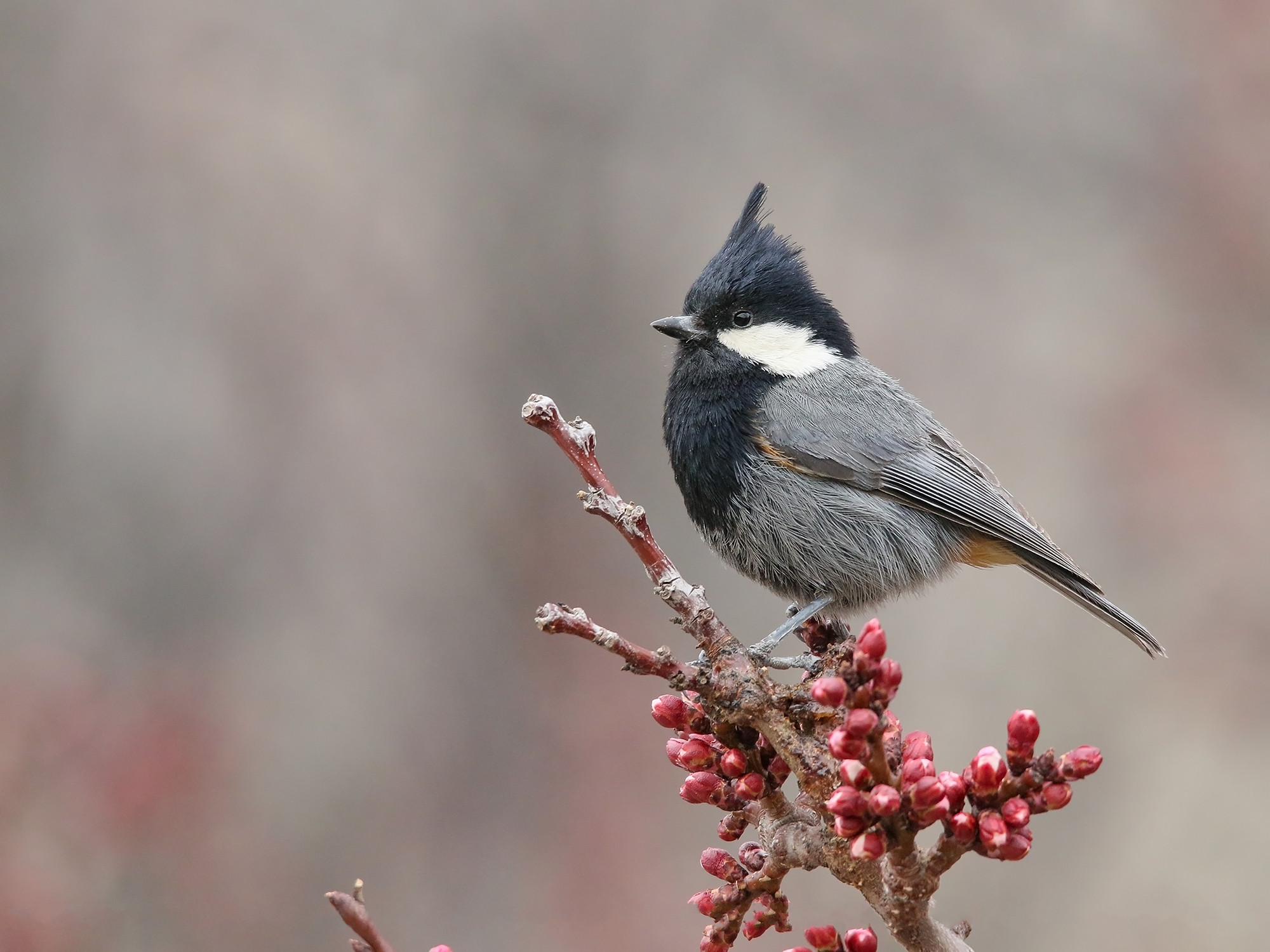

Conservation status
- Least Concern (IUCN 3.1)

Scientific classification
- Kingdom: Animalia
- Phylum: Chordata
- Class: Aves
- Order: Passeriformes
- Family: Paridae
- Genus: Periparus
- Species: P. rufonuchalis

Binomial name
- Periparus rufonuchalis (Blyth, 1849)
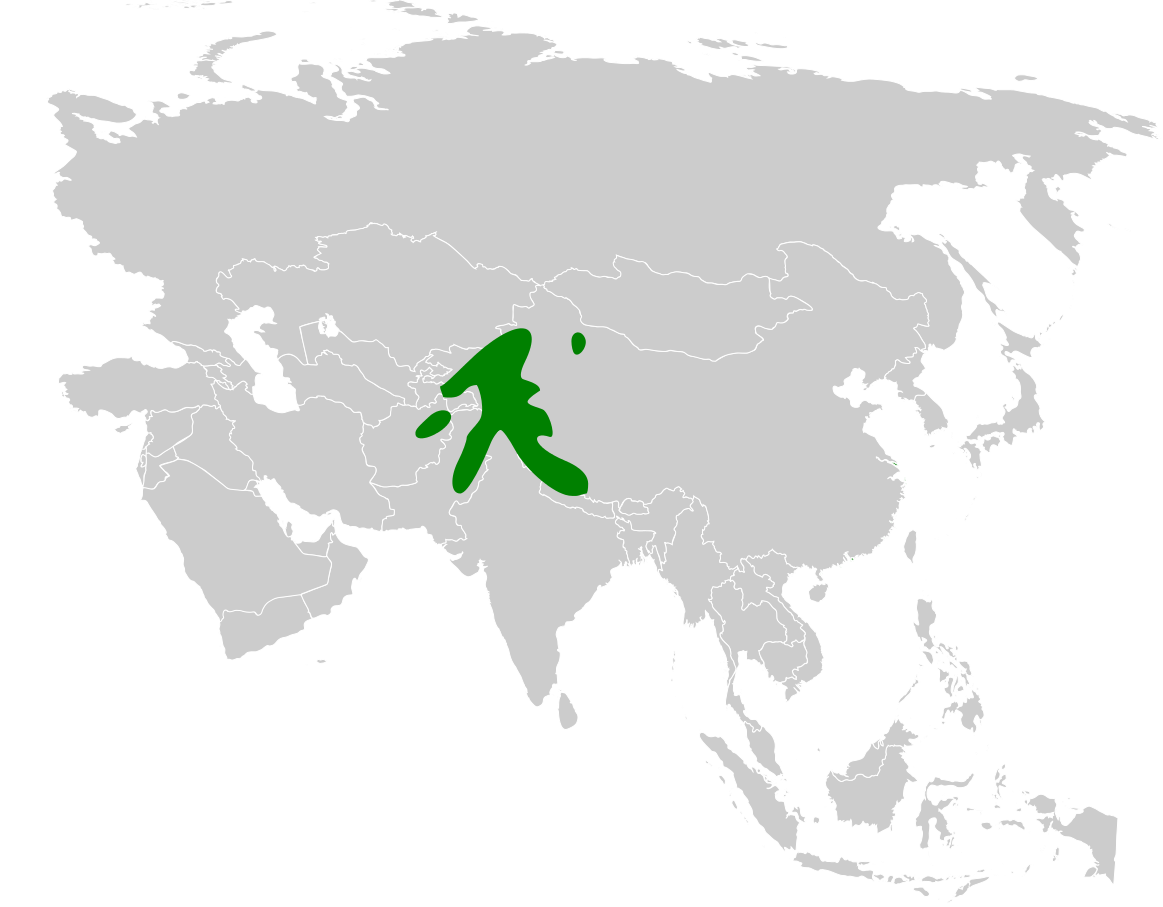
- Range of Periparus rufonuchalis

Synonyms
- Parus rufonuchalis Blyth, 1849

= Rufous-naped tit =

Species of bird

The rufous-naped tit (Periparus rufonuchalis), also known as the black tit, Simla black tit or black crested tit, is a species of passerine bird belonging to the family Paridae, the tits, titmice and chickadees. This tit is found in the Himalayas and the mountains of Central Asia.

== Taxonomy ==
The rufous-naped tit was first formally described as Parus rufonuchalis in 1849 by the English ornithologist Edward Blyth with its type locality given as a range beyond Simla, near the snow-line, in the northwestern Himalayas. Blyth placed this species in the genus Parus but this name is now considered to apply only to the great tit (Parus major) and its clade, this species was reclassified in the genus Periparus, alongside the widespread Palearctic coal tit (P.ater) and four other related Asian species.

== Description ==
The rufous-naped tit is 130 mm (5.1 in) in length. The headis black with a tuft on the crown, there is a white, oblong chhek patch and a spot on the nape which is typically edged with reddish-buff. The throat and breast are black, this exytends onto the upper beekly and the rest of the underparts are grey, with reddish spots under the wing and on the undertail coverts. The bib is paler on juveniles.

== Distribuition and habitat ==
The rufous-naped tit is found in the mountains of southern central Asia and the western Himalayas. It occurs in the Tien Shan ranges in Uzbekistan, Tadzhikistan and Kyrgyzstan east into Xinjiang. It is found in Afghanistan, northern Pakistan, northwestern India and Nepal. This species prefers high altitude coniferous forests normally of spruce, fir and deodar, however, in the drier western parts of its range it is assocuiated with junipers, it may also be found in areas ofmixed forest and rhododendrons. In wuinter they may undertake some altudinal migration to lower slopes and foothills.

== Biology ==
The rufous-naped tit is found as individuals or in pairs or small parties, and it frequently joins mixed foraging flocks. This species will feed from all the layers of its forest habitat and feed on insectsseeds and berries. They will wedge hard food items such as nuts in cracks in bark to hold them while the bird hammers them open. They breed in May and June, April in Afghnaistan and Pakistan. The nest is placed in a crevice or a hole in the ground, steep alopes or stone walls, under boulders or between the roots of large trees. The nest is a pad of moss with a lining of feathers, hair and woold. The clutch is between 4 and 6 eggs, after hatching both the male and female bring food to the young.
