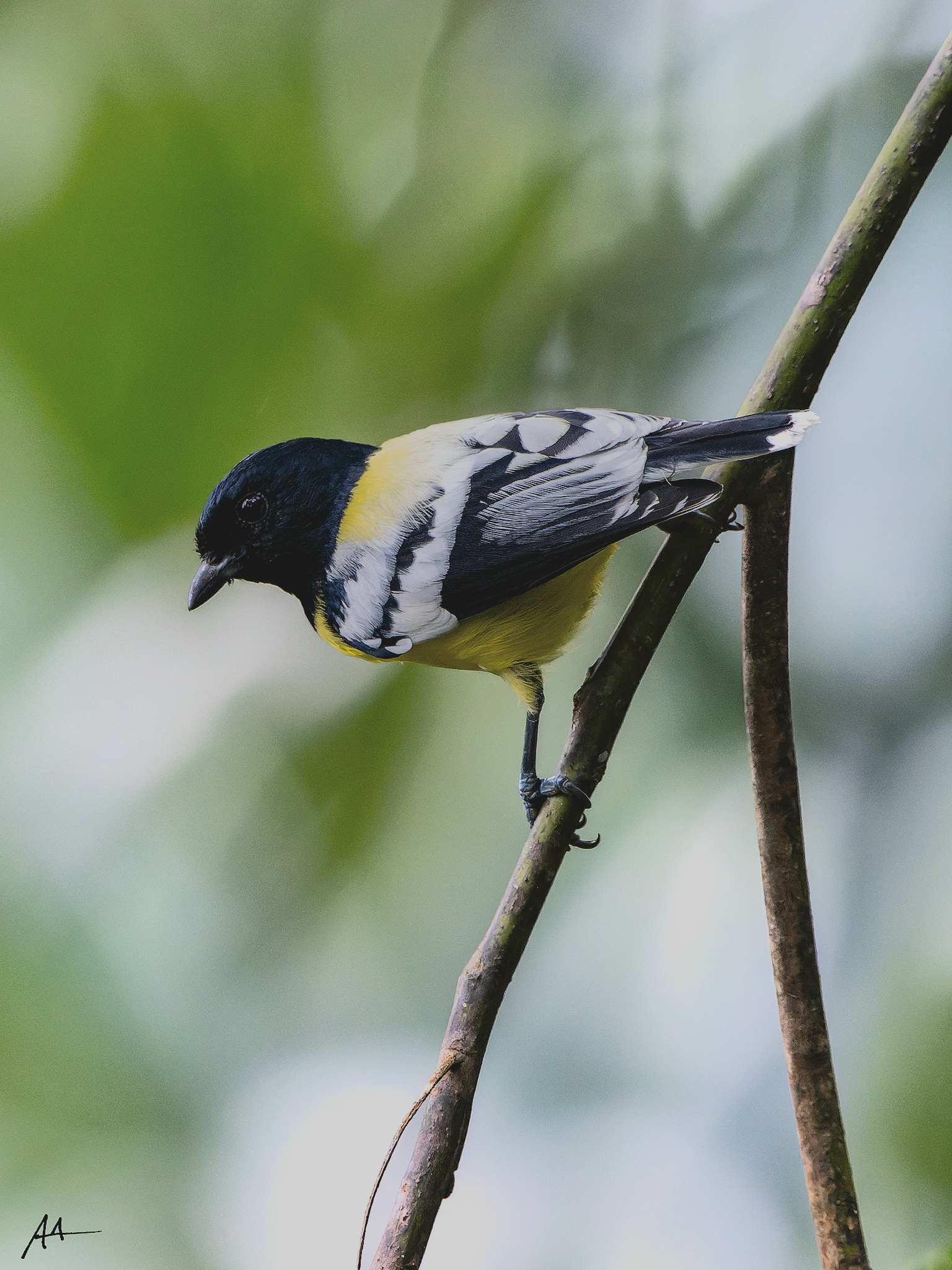

Conservation status
- Near Threatened (IUCN 3.1)

Scientific classification
- Kingdom: Animalia
- Phylum: Chordata
- Class: Aves
- Order: Passeriformes
- Family: Paridae
- Genus: Periparus
- Species: P. amabilis

Binomial name
- Periparus amabilis (Sharpe, 1877)

Synonyms
- Parus amabilis; Pardaliparus amabilis

= Palawan tit =

Species of bird

The Palawan tit (Periparus amabilis) is a species of bird in the tit family Paridae.

It is endemic to Palawan and the smaller islands of Calauit and Balabac in the Philippines. Within its range, it is found in lowland forest habitats, including secondary forests, forest edge and swamps, as well as submontane forests. It is declining due to habitat loss.

== Description and taxonomy ==
It is described on eBird as "A small bird of wooded areas on Palawan and neighboring islands, with a full black hood, yellow underparts, a black wing with two white wing-bars and edges, and a black tail with a white tip and outer tail feathers. Back is bright yellow in males and olive in females. Somewhat similar to male common iora, but Palawan tit also has a black rather than yellow throat. Voice includes an up-and-down whistled song, a high-pitched tinkling trill, and a nasal rasp."

The male Palawan tit has a black head, throat and neck, a yellow back, belly and breast, and pied black and white wings and tail. The female exhibits limited sexual dimorphism, having an olive back, but is otherwise similar to the male.

This species is monotypic and has no subspecies.

== Behaviour and ecology ==
It has been observed feeding on invertebrates, fruit and seeds, but its diet otherwise is largely unknown. It is known to forage in the canopy to the middle level of trees. It has been seen alone, in pairs, in small groups and in mixed-species flocks. Birds with enlarged gonads have been collected in May, but not much else is known about their breeding habits.

== Habitat and conservation status ==
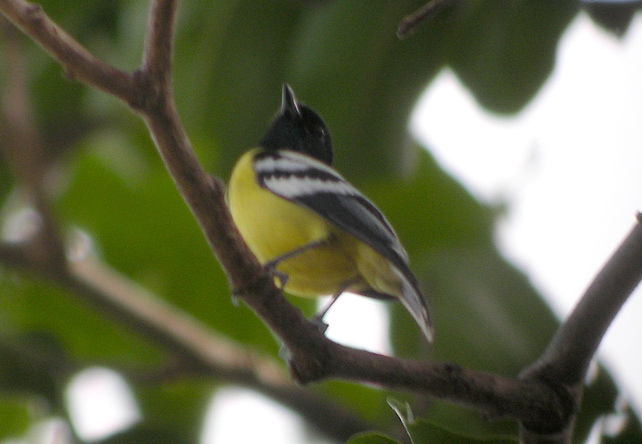

The species inhabits tropical moist lowland primary forest and secondary forest up to 800 meters above sea level.

It is assessed as near threatened under the IUCN with populations believed to be decreasing due to habitat loss and deforestation. The entire province of Palawan was designated as a Biosphere Reserve; however, the protection and enforcement of laws have been challenging, and these threats persist. It occurs in just one protected area in Puerto Princesa Subterranean River National Park.

== Sources ==
- BirdLife International 2004. Parus amabilis. 2006 IUCN Red List of Threatened Species. Downloaded on 26 July 2007.
- Gosler, A. & P. Clement (2007) "Family Paridae (Tits and Chickadees)" P.p. 662-709. in del Hoyo, J.; Elliot, A. & Christie D. (editors). (2007). Handbook of the Birds of the World. Volume 12: Picathartes to Tits and Chickadees. Lynx Edicions. ISBN 978-84-96553-42-2
