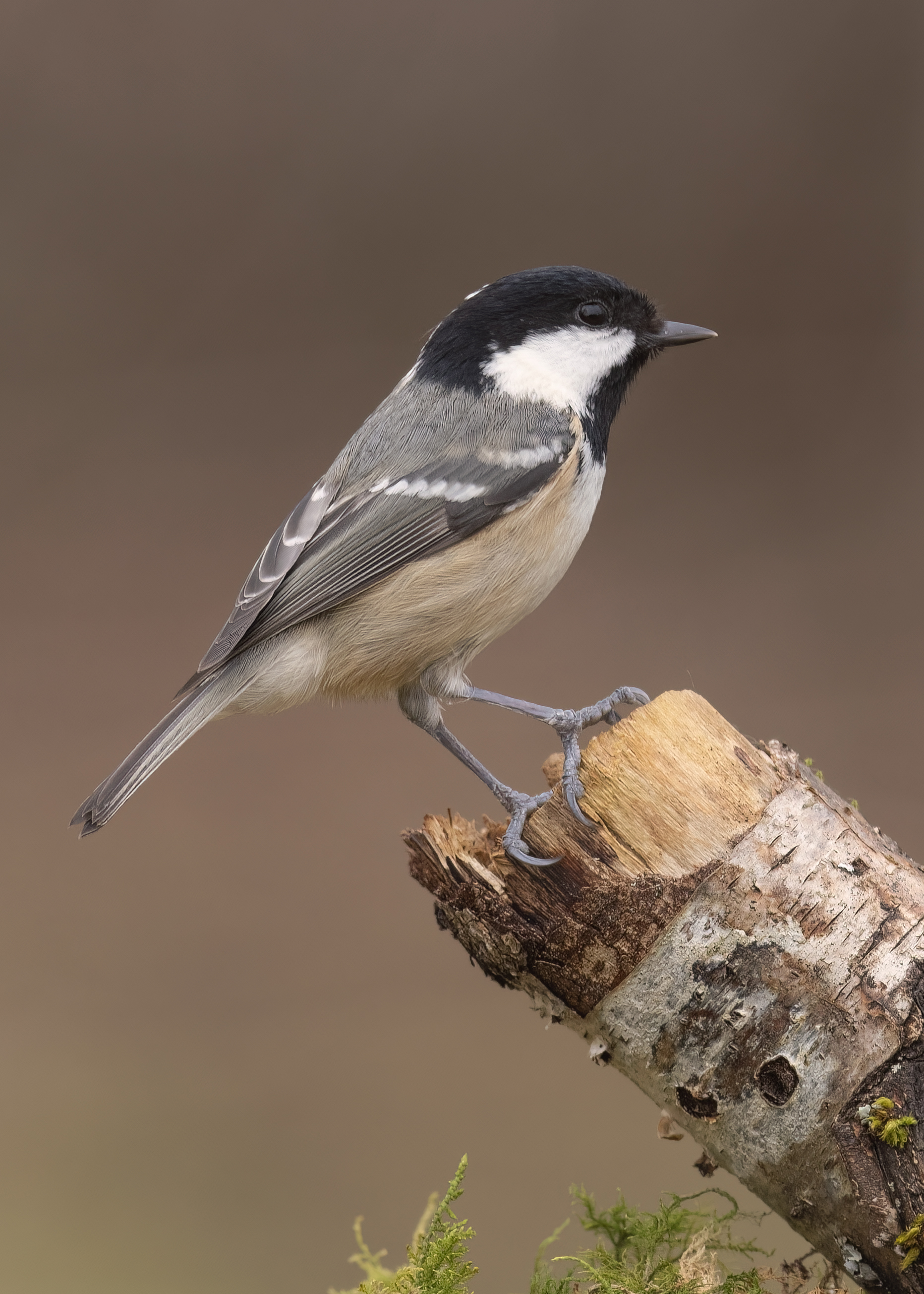
- Coal tit, Periparus ater

Scientific classification
- Kingdom: Animalia
- Phylum: Chordata
- Class: Aves
- Order: Passeriformes
- Family: Paridae
- Genus: Periparus de Sélys-Longchamps, 1884

Type species
- Parus ater Linnaeus, 1758

Species
- See text
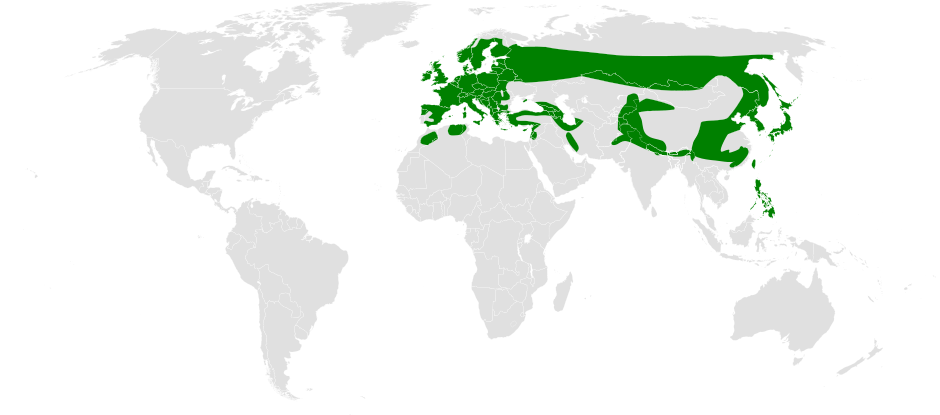
- Range of Periparus

Synonyms
- Pardaliparus de Sélys-Longchamps, 1884

= Periparus =

Genus of birds

Periparus is a genus of birds in the tit family Paridae. The birds in the genus were formerly included in Parus but were moved to Periparus when Parus was split into several resurrected genera following the publication of a detailed molecular phylogenetic analysis in 2005.

== Taxonomy ==
The name Periparus had been introduced for a subgenus of Parus that included the coal tit by the Belgium naturalist Edmond de Sélys Longchamps in 1884. The genus name, is Ancient Greek peri plus the pre-existing genus Parus.

The genus contains the following six species:

Image	Common name	Scientific name	Distribution
	Yellow-bellied tit	Periparus venustulus	mixed woodland of eastern, central, and southern China
	Palawan tit	Periparus amabilis	southwestern Philippines (Balabac Island, Calauit, and Palawan)
	Elegant tit	Periparus elegans	Philippines (except Palawan group)
	Coal tit	Periparus ater	widespread across the Palearctic
	Rufous-naped tit	Periparus rufonuchalis	west, northwest Himalayas
	Rufous-vented tit	Periparus rubidiventris	Himalayas to Myanmar

All occur in Asia; the coal tit also has a wide range in Europe and North Africa. These birds have white cheeks and most have a tufted head.
