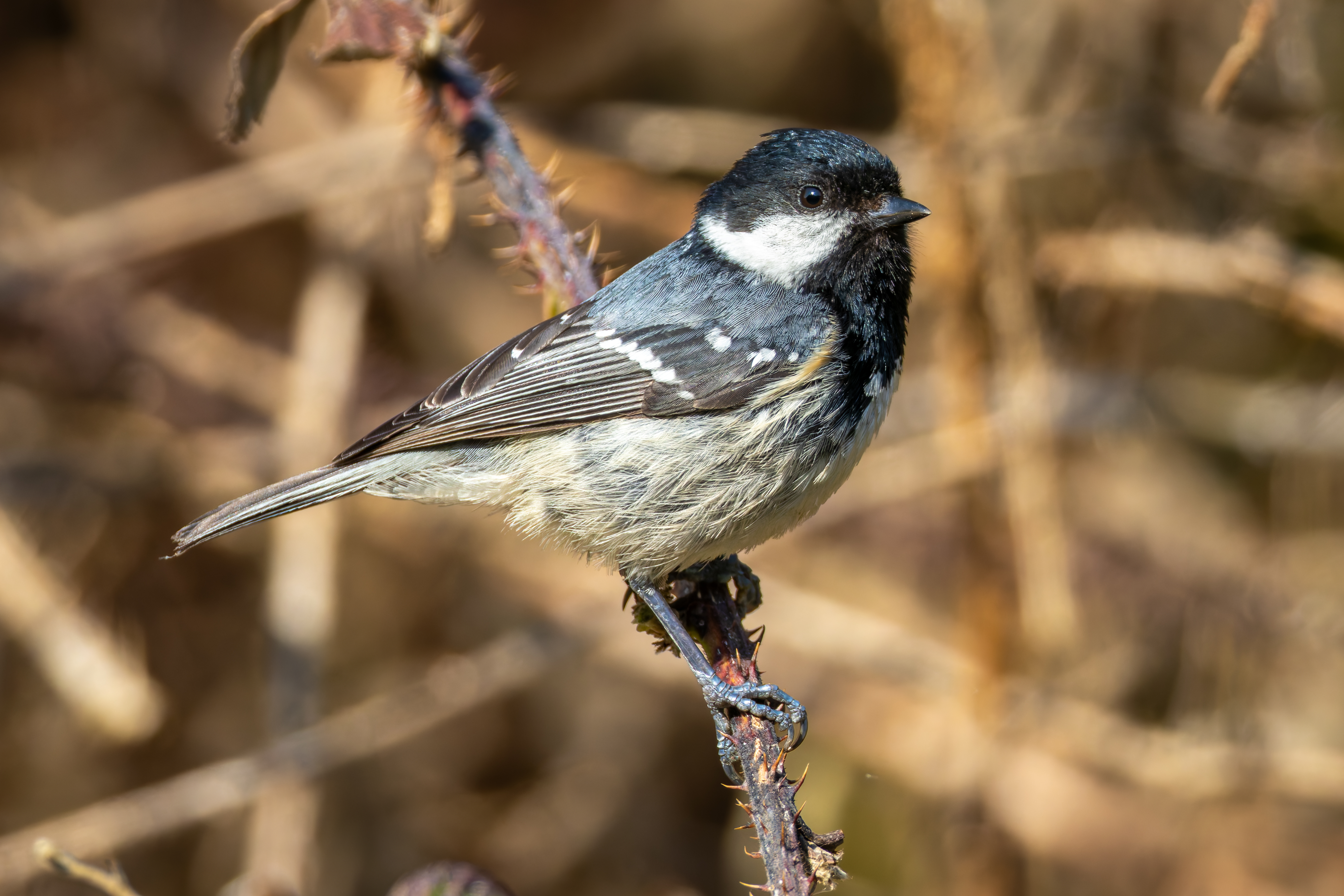
- Nominate P. a. ater, Paris, France

Conservation status
- Least Concern (IUCN 3.1)

Scientific classification
- Kingdom: Animalia
- Phylum: Chordata
- Class: Aves
- Order: Passeriformes
- Family: Paridae
- Genus: Periparus
- Species: P. ater

Binomial name
- Periparus ater (Linnaeus, 1758)
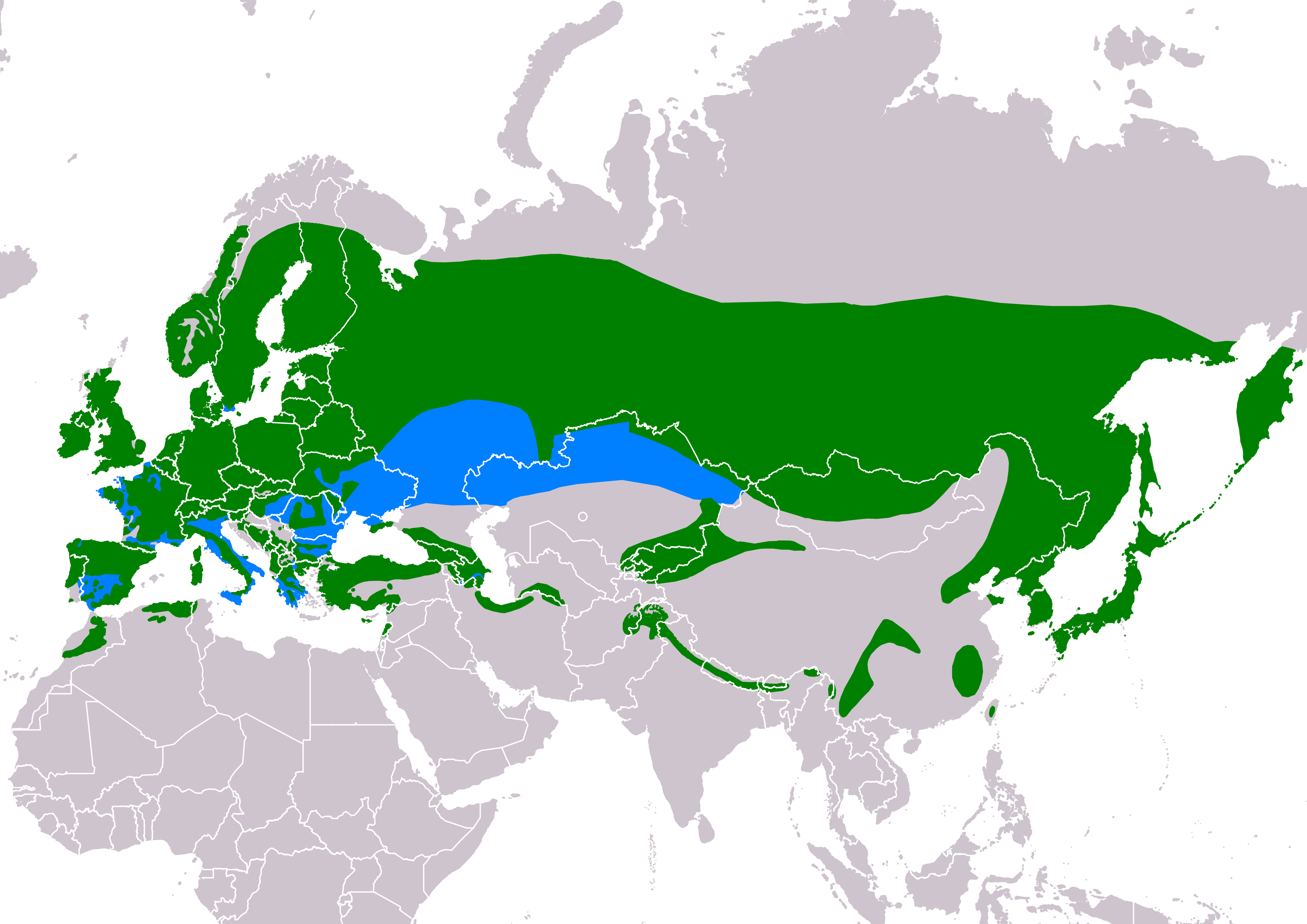
- Range of P. ater Resident Non-breeding

Synonyms
- Parus ater Linnaeus, 1758

= Coal tit =

Species of bird

The coal tit (Periparus ater) is a passerine bird in the tit family, Paridae. It is a widespread and common resident breeder in forests throughout the temperate to subtropical Palearctic, including North Africa. The black-crested tit is now included in this species.

== Taxonomy and systematics ==
This species was first described by Carl Linnaeus in his landmark 1758 10th edition of Systema Naturae. Linnaeus' primary reference was his earlier Fauna Svecica, whose pre-binomial name Parus capite nigro: vertice albo, dorso cinereo, pectore albo ("black-headed tit with white nape, ash-grey back, white breast") became Parus ater. This name – meaning "dusky-black tit" – was simply adopted from older ornithological textbooks, ultimately going back to Conrad Gessner's 1555 Historia animalium. He gave no type locality except "Europe", but his original description refers to the population inhabiting Sweden (which is consequently included in the nominate subspecies today). The current genus name, is Ancient Greek peri plus the pre-existing genus Parus. The specific ater is Latin for "dull black".

The coal tit is placed in the genus Periparus, which was formerly widely considered a subgenus of Parus. Following the publication of a detailed molecular phylogenetic analysis in 2013, the genus Parus was split into several resurrected genera. Periparus was shown to be more closely related to the Poecile tits and chickadees than to the great tit and its relatives.

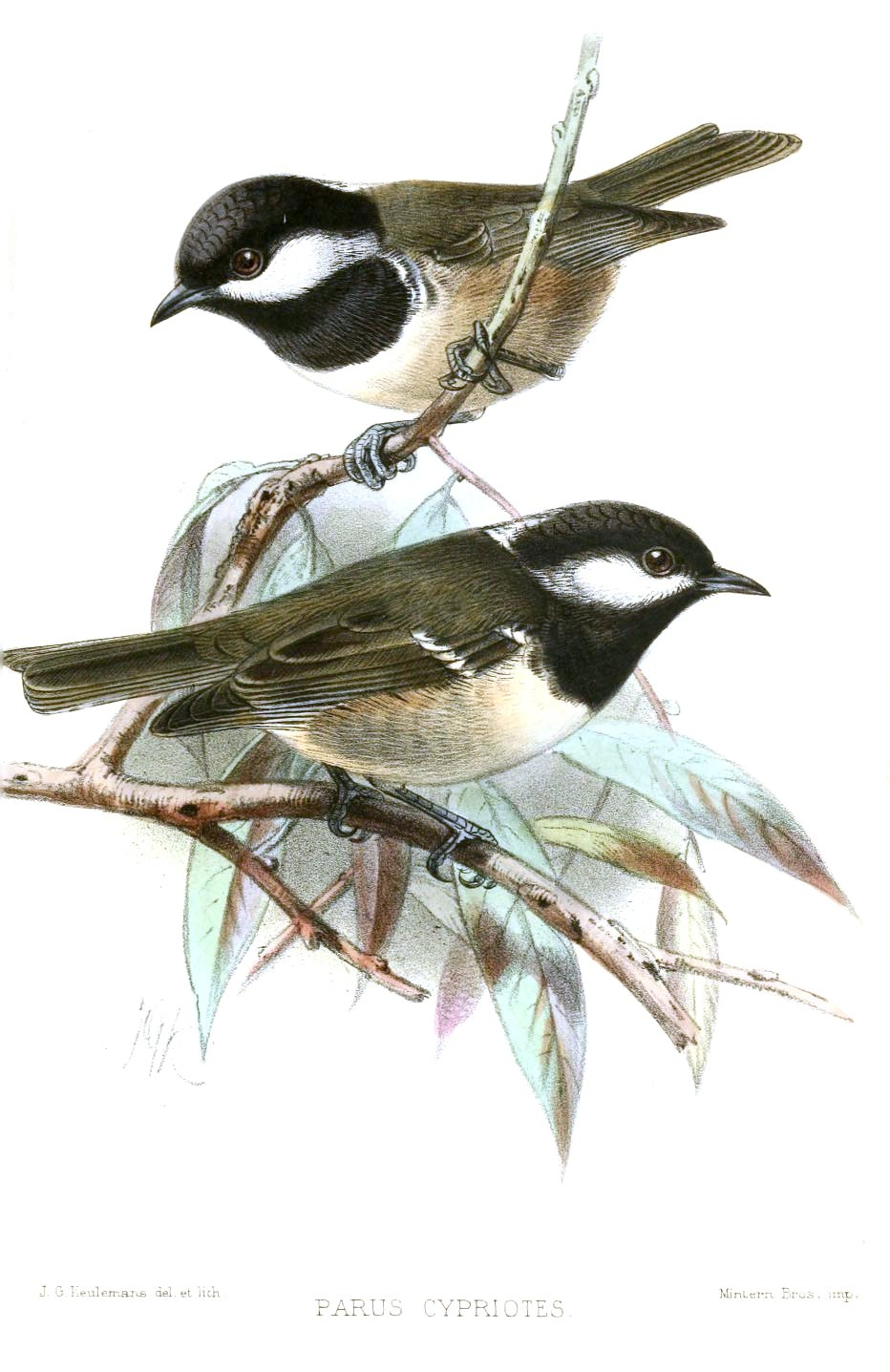
Illustration of Periparus ater cypriotes by John Gerrard Keulemans

=== Subspecies ===
A total of 21 subspecies of coal tit are currently accepted:

- Periparus ater britannicus (Sharpe, RB; Dresser, HE, 1871) — Great Britain, and County Down in northeastern Ireland
- Periparus ater hibernicus (Ingram, C, 1910) — Ireland (except far northeast)
- Periparus ater ater (Linnaeus, C, 1758) — continental Europe to Siberia, Mongolia, Sakhalin, and northeastern China
- Periparus ater vieirae (Nicholson, F, 1906) — Iberian Peninsula
- Periparus ater sardus (Kleinschmidt, O, 1903) — Corsica and Sardinia
- Periparus ater atlas (Meade-Waldo, EGB, 1901) — northern Morocco
- Periparus ater ledouci (Malherbe, A, 1845) — northern Africa (northern Tunisia and northern Algeria)
- Periparus ater cypriotes (Guillemard, FHH, 1888) — Cyprus
- Periparus ater moltchanovi (Menzbier, MA, 1903) — Crimea
- Periparus ater michalowskii (Bogdanov, MN, 1879) — Caucasus and Transcaucasia
- Periparus ater derjugini Zarudny, NA; Loudon, HGG, 1903 — mountains of northeastern Turkey, western Georgia, and Black Sea coast of Russia
- Periparus ater eckodedicatus (Martens, J; Tietze, DT; Sun Y, 2006) — southwestern to central China
- Periparus ater phaeonotus (Blanford, WT, 1873) — southeastern Azerbaijan, northern Iran, and southwestern Turkmenistan
- Periparus ater rufipectus (Severtsov, NA, 1873) — Kazakhstan (Tien Shan Mountains) to northwestern China (Xinjiang)
- Periparus ater martensi (Eck, S, 1998) — Kali Gandaki area, central Nepal
- Periparus ater melanolophus (Vigors, NA, 1831) — coniferous forest of eastern Afghanistan to western Nepal
- Periparus ater aemodius (Blyth, E, 1845) — eastern Himalayas; northeastern Myanmar and Tibet
- Periparus ater pekinensis (Verreaux, JP, 1868) — northeastern China (southern Liaoning to Shaanxi and Shantung Peninsula)
- Periparus ater insularis (Hellmayr, CE, 1902) — southern Kuril Islands, Japan, and Jeju Islands (Korea)
- Periparus ater kuatunensis (La Touche, JDD, 1923) — montane forest of southeastern China (Anhui, Fujian, and Zhejiang)
- Periparus ater ptilosus (Ogilvie-Grant, WR, 1912) — Taiwan

The differences in colouration are quite pronounced in some of them, while the differences in size are more subtle. Coal tits from Asia follow Bergmann's rule, being larger in colder regions. However, those from further west do not conform to this rule, as the birds from the uplands around the Mediterranean are larger than those from northern Europe. Across its range, the ratio of tail length to body length increases along a cline running from southwest to northeast.

The British race P. a. britannicus has an olive hue to its brownish-grey back plumage, distinguishing it from the continental European nominate subspecies P. a. ater and P. a. abietum in which the back is bluish grey without a hint of green or brown. The Irish race P. a. hibernicus is distinguished from britannicus by the pale sulphur-yellow cheeks, breast and belly. It also has a paler rump due to light fringes of the uppertail coverts, and a larger bill than its relatives from Britain and the Continent.

The North African race P. a. ledouci has yellow underparts and cheeks, and the Cypriot P. a. cypriotes has a buff tinge to its upperparts and deep buff underparts. Asian subspecies are generally rather dusky brownish except for the black-and-white head; they include among others P. a. michalowskii of the Caucasus, P. a. phaeonotus of Iran, or the Himalayan coal tit P. a. aemodius of southwestern China.

The black-crested tit (P. a. melanolophus, also known as the spot-winged tit) is a unique subspecies from South Asia that was formerly considered a distinct species from the coal tit. Due to similar vocalisations and behaviour, as well as paraphyly of the traditional coal tit if the black-crested tit is excluded, the two are now considered conspecific. It intergrades with the coal tit subspecies P. a. aemodius in western Nepal, and looks like a crested, darker version of the nominate subspecies.

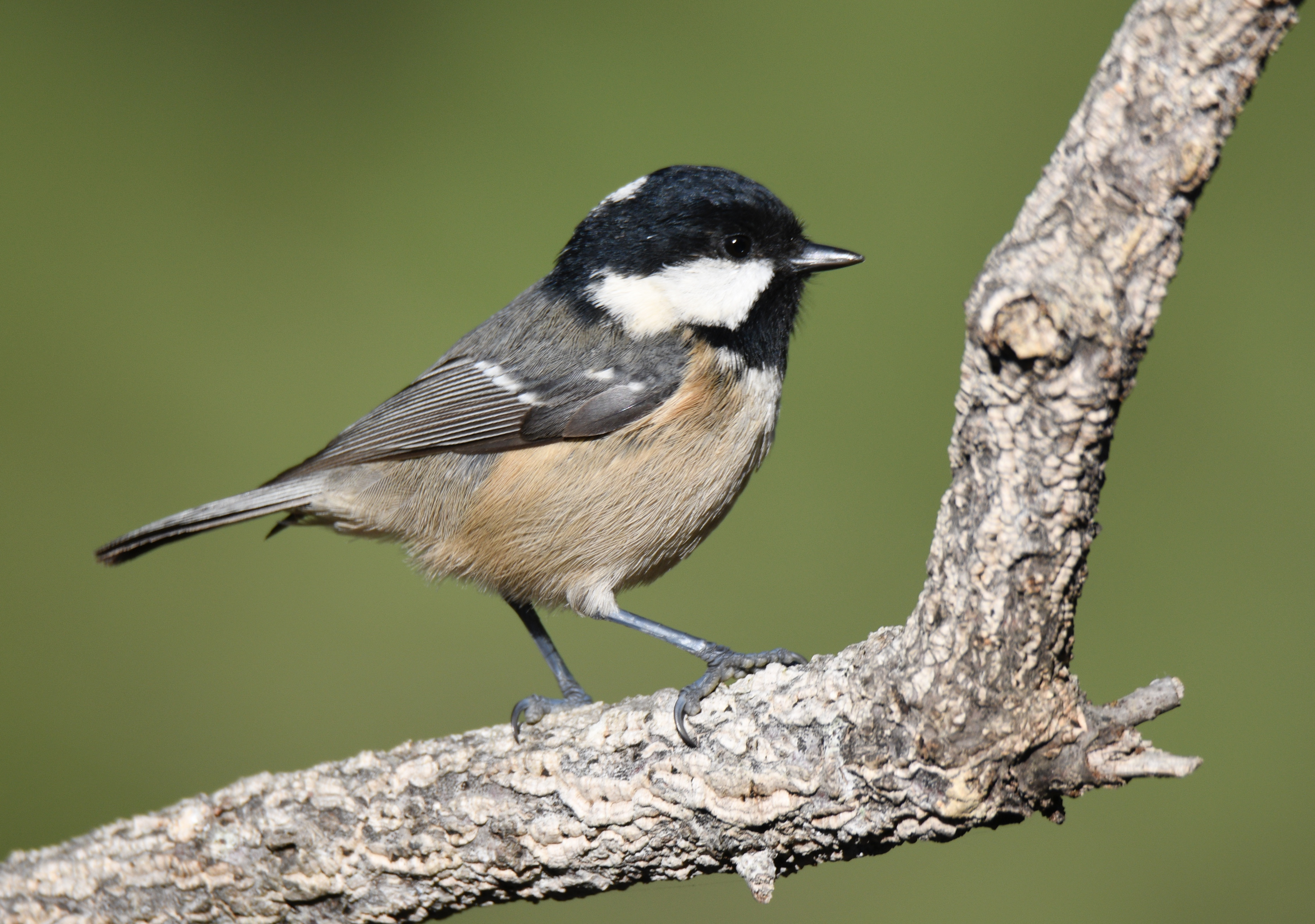
Adult Iberian coal tit, P. a. vieirae
(note buffy underparts)

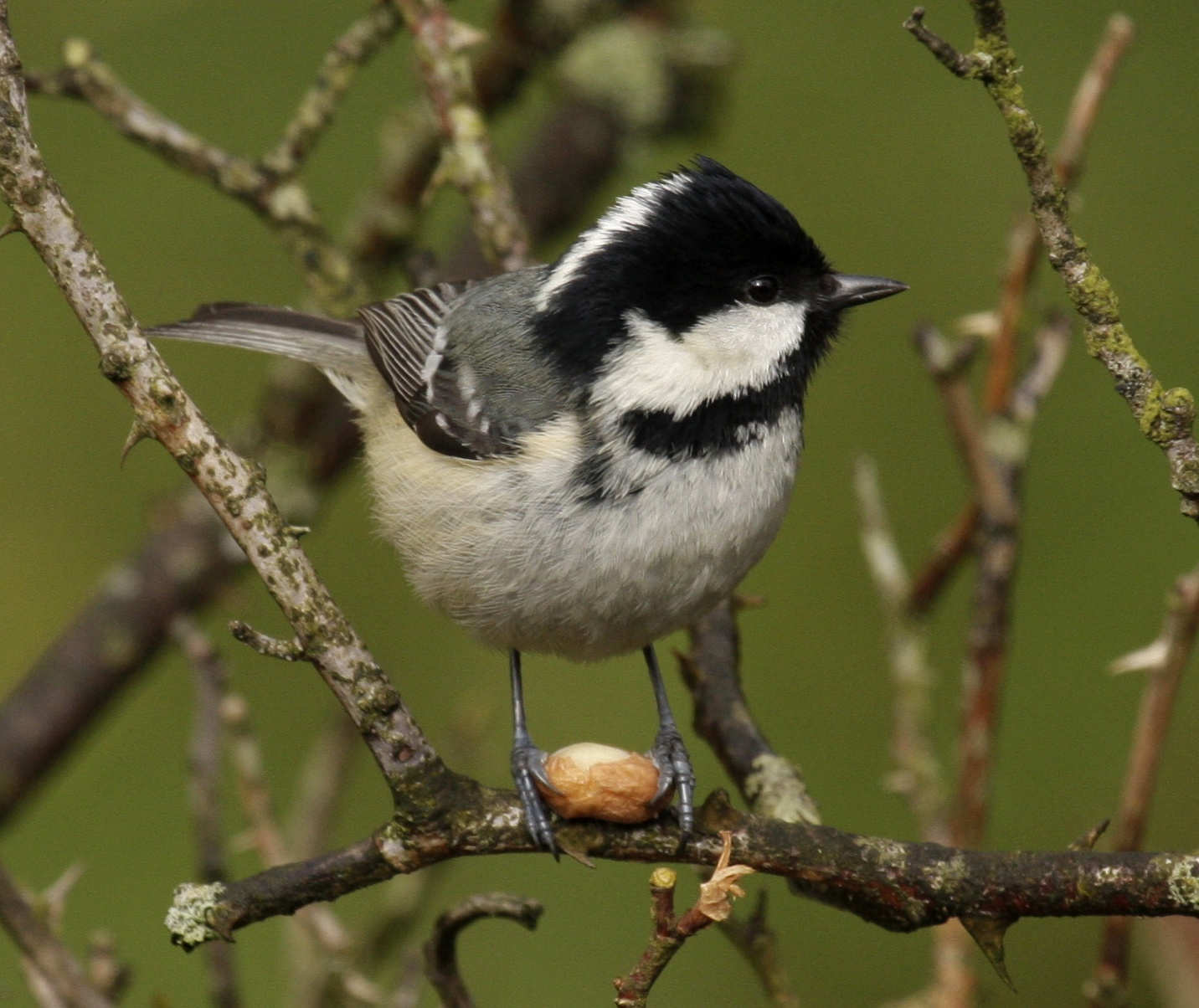
Adult British coal tit, P. a. britannicus
(note greenish-grey back)

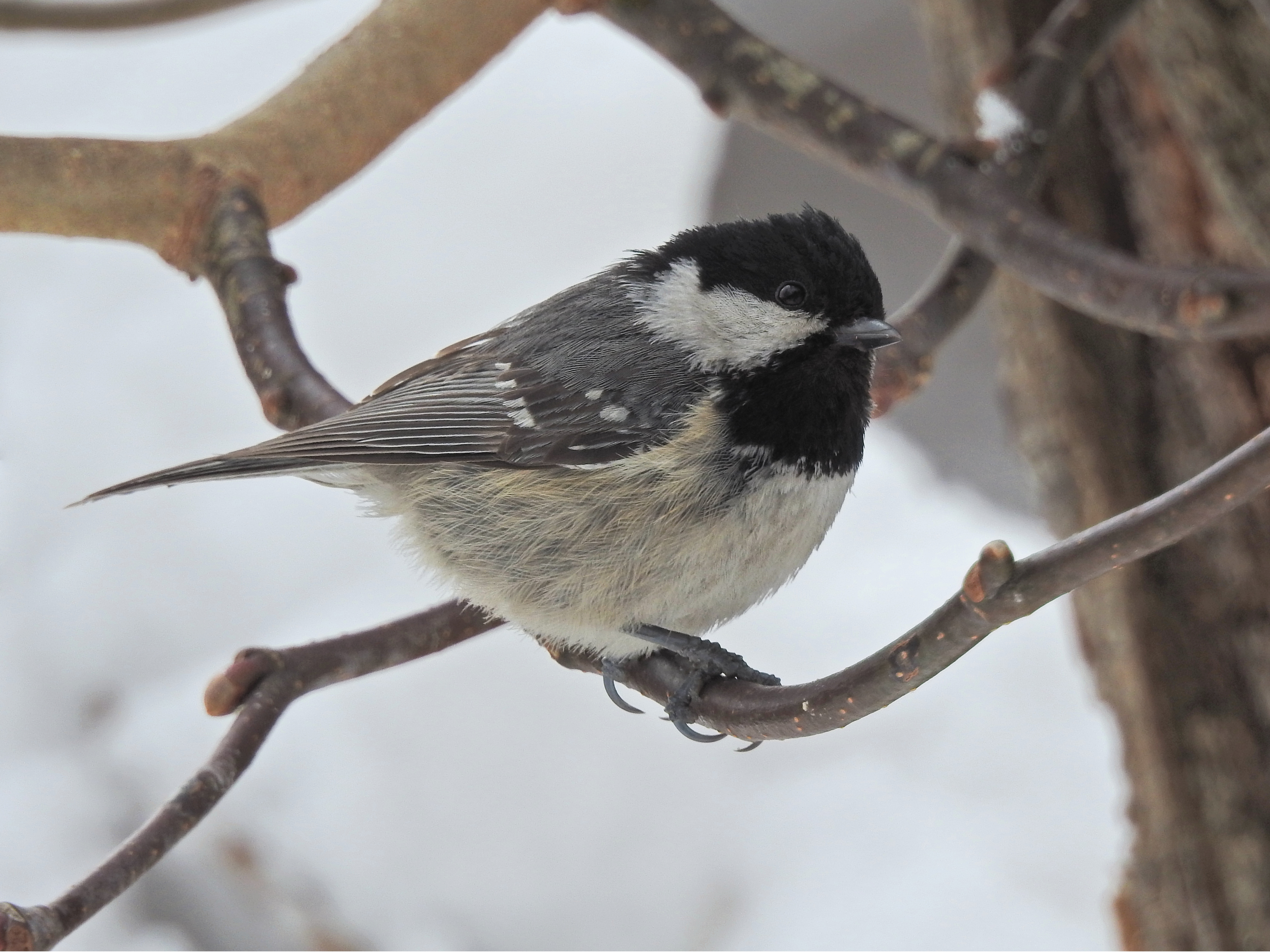
Adult continental coal tit, P. a. ater
(note blue-grey back)

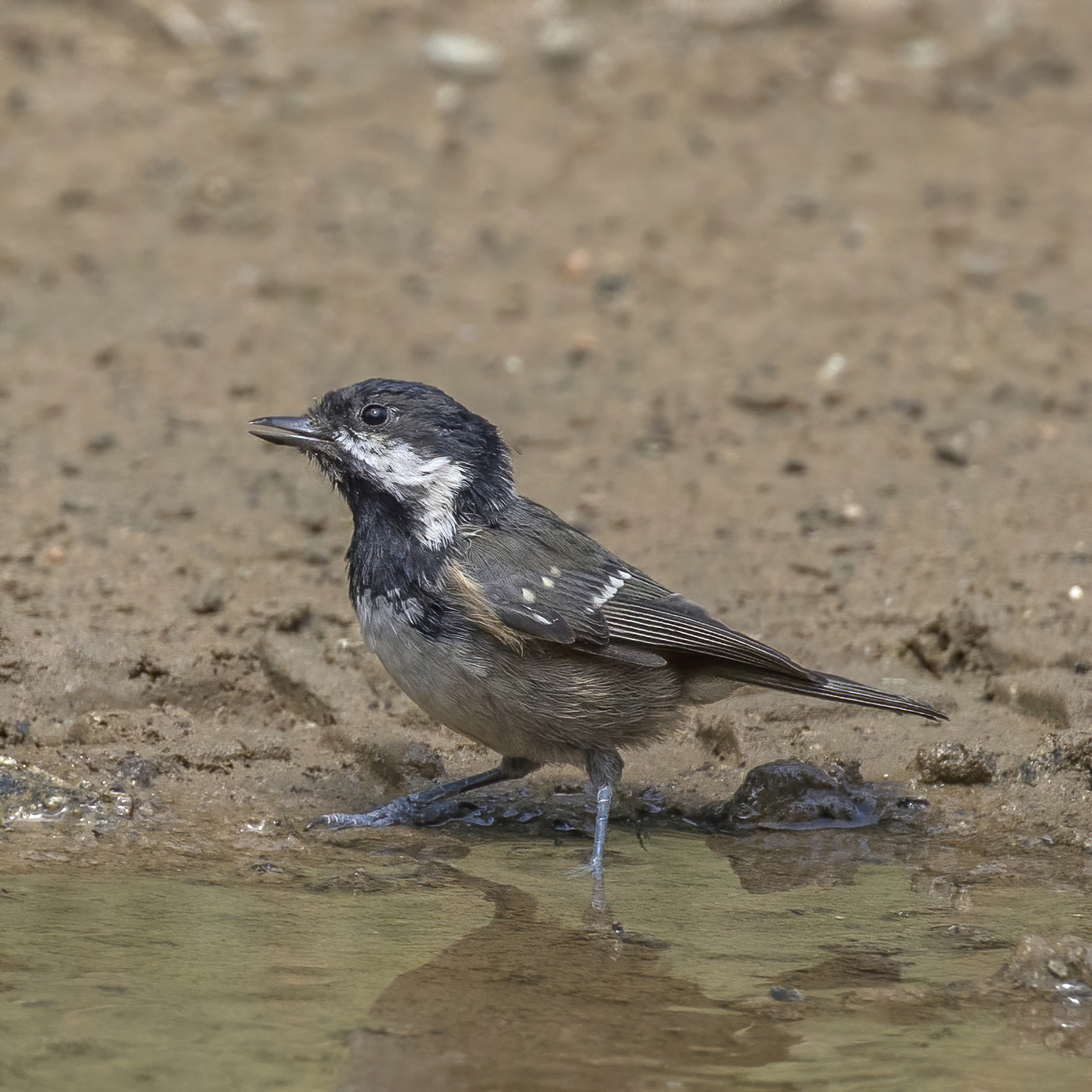
Cyprus coal tit, P. a. cypriotes
(note buff underparts)

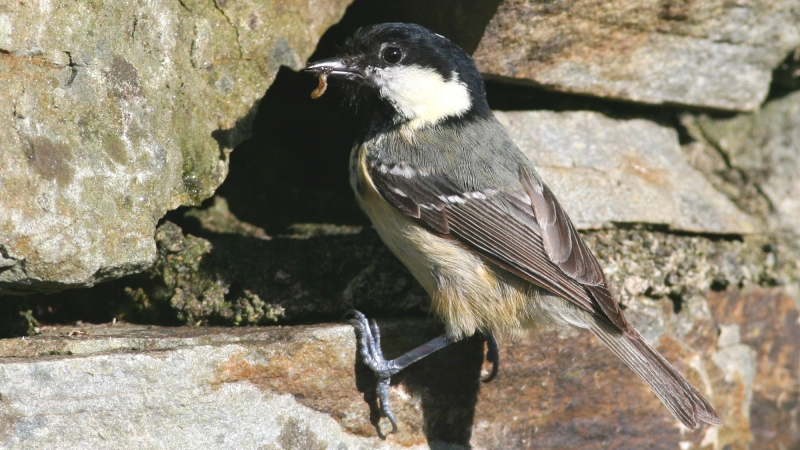
Irish coal tit, P. a. hibernicus
(note yellowish cheeks and breast)

== Description ==
Periparus ater filmed in Tokyo, Japan

The coal tit is 10–11.5 cm in length, and has a distinctive large white nape spot on its black head. The head, throat and neck of the adult are glossy blue-black, contrasting with the off-white sides of the face, which are tinged grey or yellow depending on subspecies. The brilliant white nape is another striking feature, as are the white tips of the wing coverts, which appear as two wingbars. The underparts are whitish, shading from buff to rufous on the flanks. The bill is black, the legs are lead-coloured, and the irides are dark brown.

Juvenile birds have duller plumage than adults. They lack the glossy black head of adults and the white nape and cheeks are tinged yellow.

While searching for food, flocks of coal tits maintain contact with incessant short dee or see-see calls. The species' song – if "song" it can be called – is a strident if-he, if-he, if-he, most frequently heard from January to June, but also in autumn. It resembles the song of the great tit, but is much faster and higher in pitch. One variant of this song ends with a sharp ichi. North African birds also have a currr call similar to that of the crested tit (Lophophanes cristatus) which is not found in Africa.

== Behaviour and ecology ==
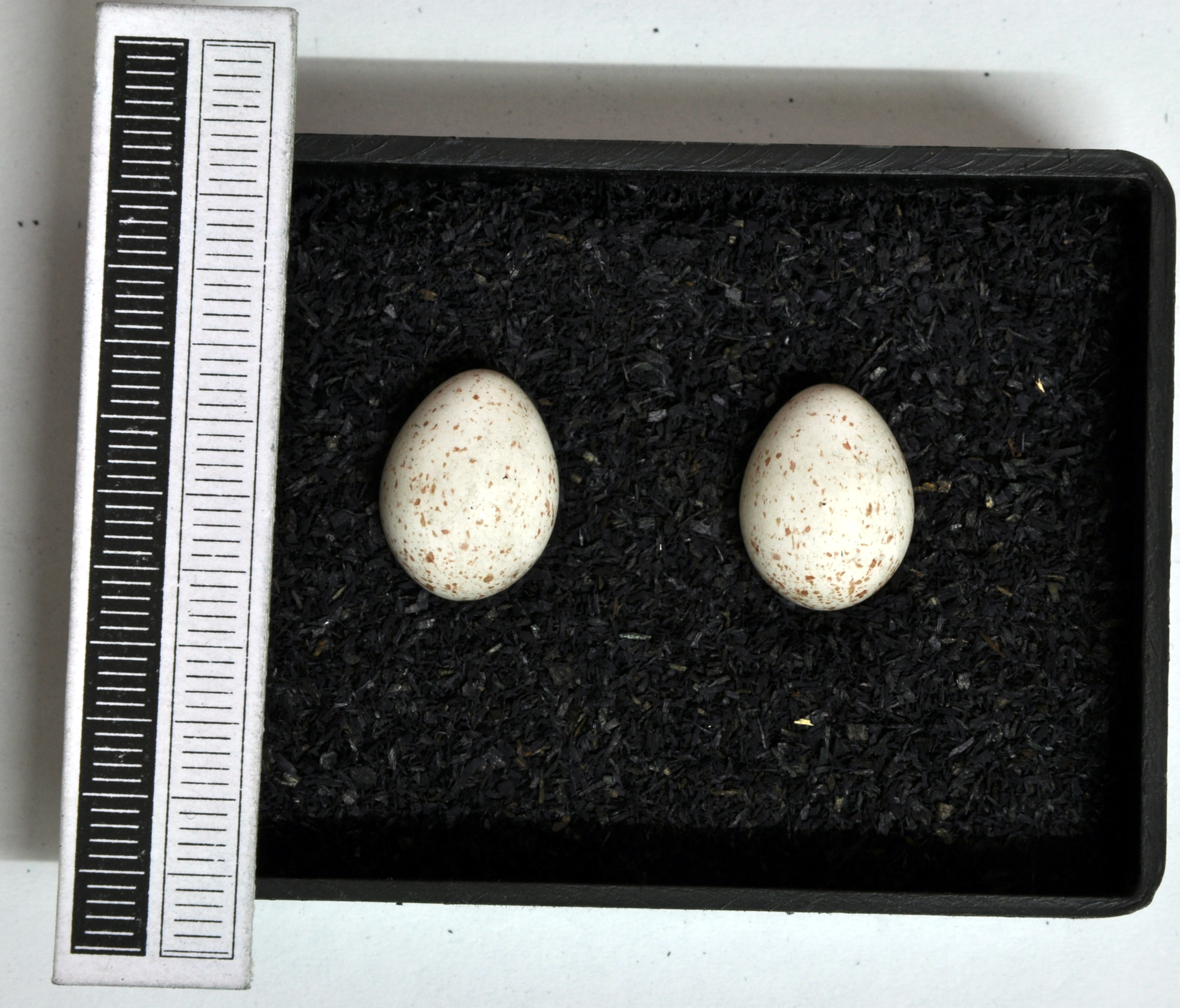
Eggs, Collection Museum Wiesbaden

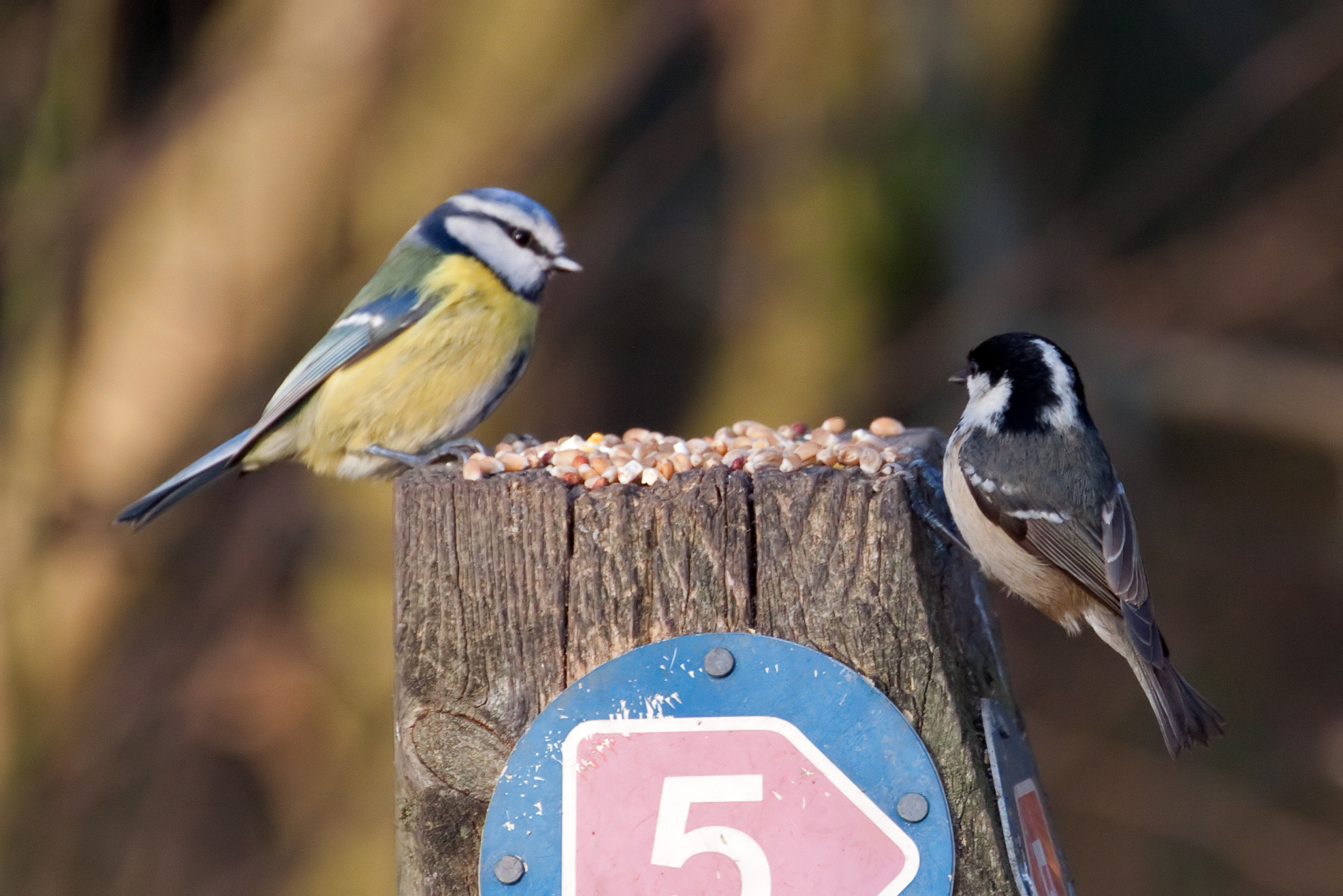
With Eurasian blue tit

It is typically a bird of temperate humid conifer forest, but apart from that shows little habitat specificity. In Bhutan for example coal tits are fairly common residents above the subtropical zone, at an altitude of around 3,000–3,800 m ASL, and are found in forests dominated by Bhutan fir (Abies densa) as well as in those characterized by Himalayan hemlock (Tsuga dumosa) and rhododendrons.

The coal tit is year-round resident throughout most of its range, making only local movements in response to particularly severe weather. Only the Siberian birds migrate more regularly. On rare occasions, vagrants may travel longer distances. For instance, the nominate subspecies of continental Europe was recorded in Ireland once in 1960 and once prior to then, but not since.

In winter, coal tits form small flocks in winter with other tit species. This species resembles other tits in its acrobatic skills and restless activity. However, it more frequently perches on a trunk and, with its little hops, resembles a treecreeper (Certhia). Its diet is similar to that of other tits; it particularly enjoys beechmast and picks out the seeds from fir (Abies) and larch (Larix) cones. It also joins Carduelis redpolls and siskins in alders (Alnus) and birches (Betula). Moreover, it will visit gardens to feed on a variety of foods, particularly sunflower seeds.

Coal tits in the laboratory prefer to forage at a variable feeding site when they are in a negative energy budget. They increase evening body mass in response to tawny owl calls. After dawn the coal tits increases body mass as soon as possible if food is obtained at a low rate, increasing body mass exponentially until an inflection point when the increase of body mass is slower. The inflection point of the body mass trajectory is 16.7% delayed compared to a high food availability. Subordinate coal tits are excluded from feeding sites by dominants more often in the early morning than in the rest of the day, and they showed more variability in daily mass gain and body mass at dawn than dominant coal tits. In winter, the red blood cells of coal tits have been shown to contain more mitochondria, which consume oxygen and produce heat.

Being common and widespread, the coal tit is not considered a threatened species by the IUCN.

The coal tit has the dubious distinction of being the host to the largest number of bird fleas (Ceratophyllus gallinae) reported in a single nest, 5,754 fleas.

== Breeding ==
A favourite nesting site is a hole in a decaying tree stump, usually at ground level. The nest is located deep within the hole. Other sites include holes in the ground, the burrows of mice or rabbits, crevices in walls, old nests of Pica magpies or other large birds, and squirrel dreys. The nest is made of tightly packed moss, hair and grass, and is lined with rabbit fur or feathers. Seven to eleven red-spotted white eggs are usually laid in May, and this species typically breeds once a year.

== See also ==
- Common treecreeper and Hodgson's treecreeper
- Greenish warbler
