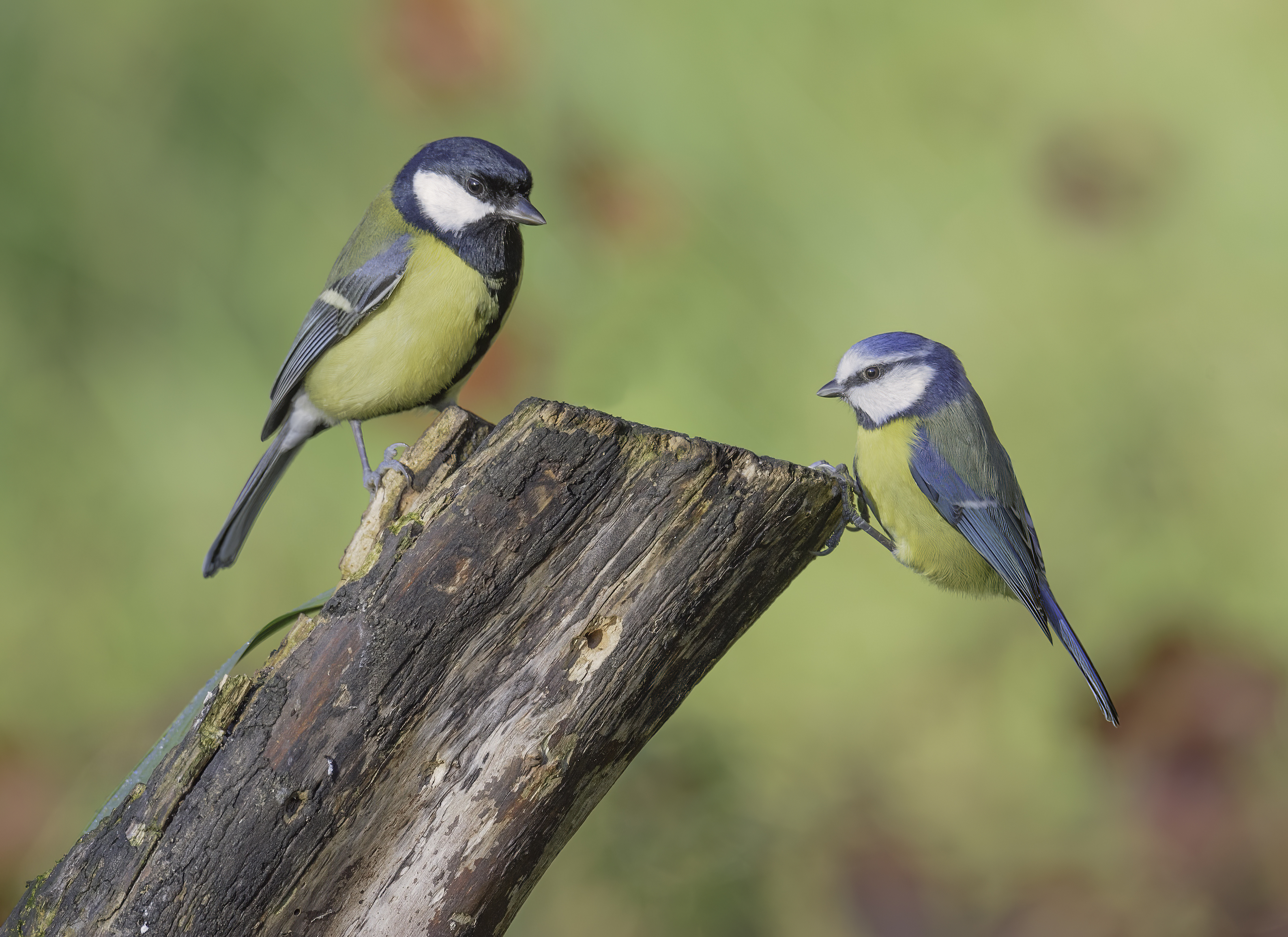
- Great tit (Parus major), left, and Eurasian blue tit (Cyanistes caeruleus), right

Scientific classification
- Kingdom: Animalia
- Phylum: Chordata
- Class: Aves
- Order: Passeriformes
- Parvorder: Sylviida
- Family: Paridae; Vigors, 1825

Genera
- 5–10, see text.
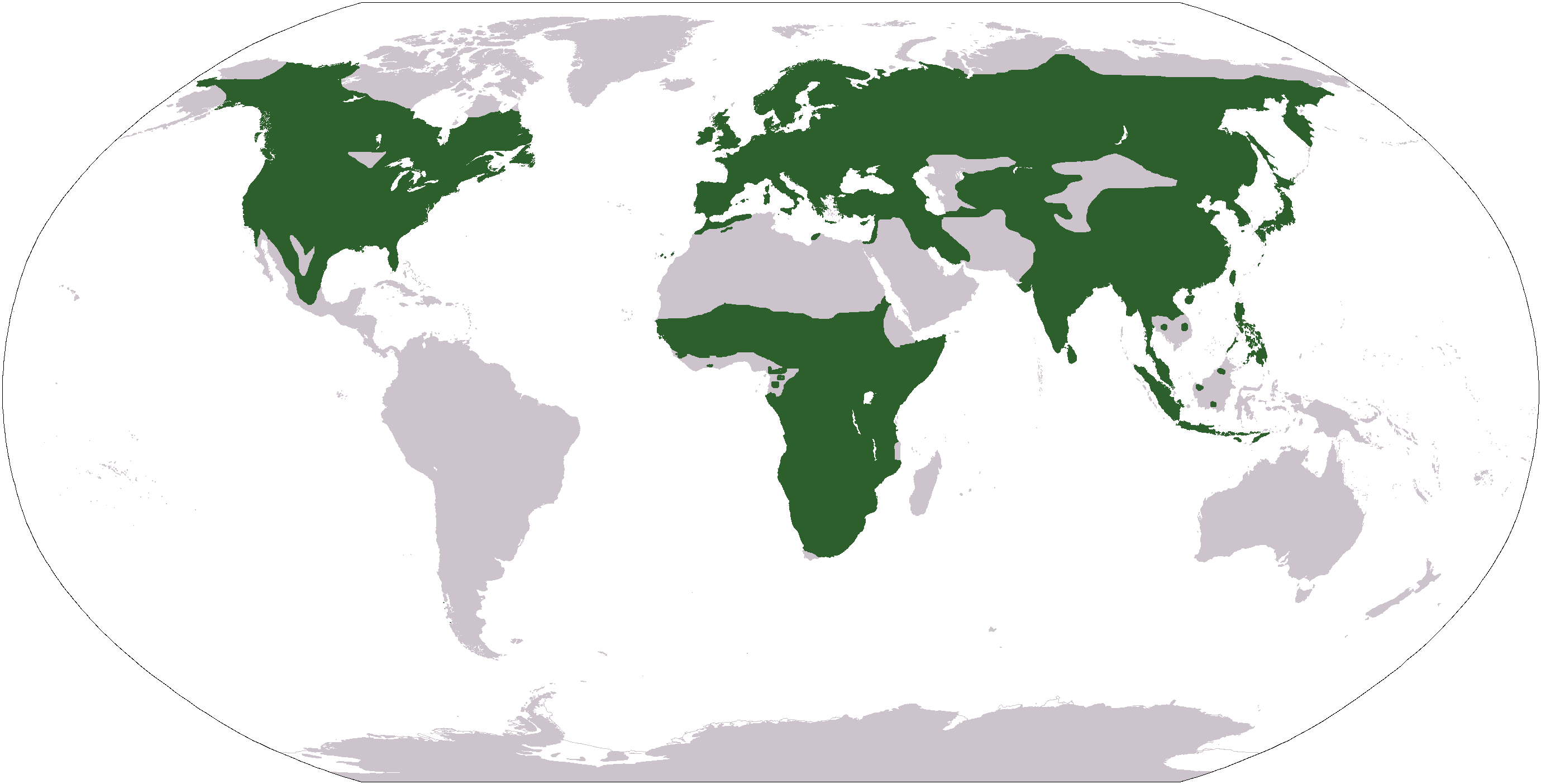
- Global range (In green)

Synonyms
- See text

= Tit (bird) =

Family of small passerine birds

The tits, chickadees, and titmice constitute the Paridae, a family of small passerine birds which occur mainly in the Northern Hemisphere and Africa. Many were formerly classified in the genus Parus.

Eurasian and African members of this family are referred to as "tits", while North American species are called either "chickadees" (onomatopoeic, derived from their distinctive "chick-a dee dee dee" alarm call) or "titmouses", the latter being an older name that was used for all tits. The name titmouse is recorded from the 14th century, composed of the Old English name for the bird, mase (Proto-Germanic *maison, Dutch mees, German Meise), and tit, denoting something small. The former spelling, "titmose", was influenced by mouse in the 16th century. Emigrants to New Zealand presumably identified some of the superficially similar birds of the genus Petroica of the family Petroicidae, the Australian robins, as members of the tit family, giving them the title tomtit, although, in fact, they are not related.

These birds are mainly small, stocky, woodland species with short, stout bills. Some have crests. They range in length from 10 to 22 cm (3.9 to 8.7 in). They are adaptable birds, with a mixed diet including seeds and insects. Many species live around human habitation and come readily to bird feeders for nuts or seed, and learn to take other foods.

== Description ==
With the exception of the three monotypic genera Sylviparus, Melanochlora, and Pseudopodoces, the tits are extremely similar in appearance, and have been described as "one of the most conservative avian families in terms of general morphology". The typical body length of adult members of the family is between 10 and 16 cm (3.9 and 6.3 in) in length; when the monotypic genera are added, this range is from 9 to 21 cm (3.5 to 8.3 in). In weight, the family ranges from 5 to 49 g (0.18 to 1.73 oz); this contracts to 7 to 29 g (0.25 to 1.02 oz) when the three atypical genera are removed. The majority of the variation within the family is in plumage, and particularly colour.

The bills of the tits are generally short, varying between stout and fine, depending on diet. The more insectivorous species have finer bills, whereas those that consume more seeds have stouter bills. It is said that tits are evolving longer beaks to reach into bird feeders. The most aberrant bill of the family is possessed by Hume's ground tit of Tibet and the Himalayas, which is long and decurved.

== Distribution and habitat ==
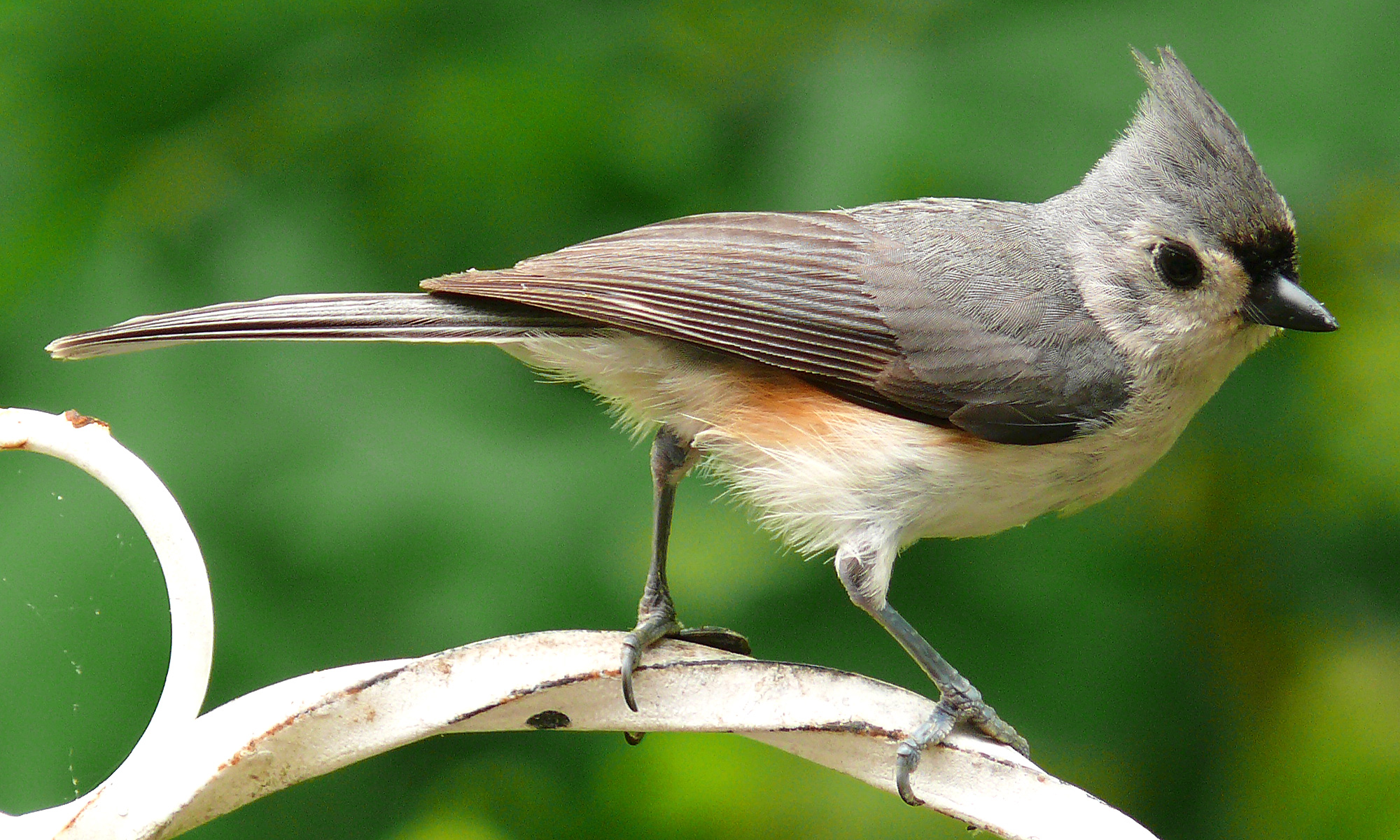
The tufted titmouse is restricted to North America.

The tits are a widespread family of birds, occurring over most of Europe, Asia, North America, and Africa. The genus Poecile occurs from Europe through Asia into North America, as far south as southern Mexico. American species in this genus are known as chickadees. Some species in this genus have quite large natural distributions; one, the grey-headed chickadee, is distributed from Scandinavia to Alaska and Canada. The majority of the tits in the genus Periparus are found in the southeastern portion of Asia. This includes two species endemic to the Philippines. The coal tit, also in this genus, is a much more widespread species, ranging from the British Isles and North Africa to Japan. The two crested tits of the genus Lophophanes have a disjunct distribution, with one species occurring in Europe and the other in central Asia.

The genus Baeolophus is endemic to North America. The genus Parus includes the great tit that ranges from Western Europe to Indonesia. Cyanistes has a European and Asian distribution (also into northern Africa), and the three remaining genera, Pseudopodoces, Sylviparus, and Melanochlora, are all restricted to Asia.

== Behaviour ==
Tits are active, noisy, and social birds. They are territorial during the breeding season and often join mixed-species feeding flocks during the nonbreeding season. The tits are highly adaptable, and after the corvids (crows and jays) and parrots, amongst the most intelligent of all birds. Tits recognize the difference between species that are dangerous or harmless to them, by this they can protect each other or their families. These birds do this by mobbing or escaping, however they also avoid the nest when predators are present in order to avoid their families being seen.

=== Fission–fusion society ===
Fission–fusion society has been documented in a number of avian taxa including this one. In brief, that means flocks can split into smaller groups or individuals, and subsequently reunite.

=== Vocalisations ===
A great tit calling in Finland.

The tits make a variety of calls and songs. They are amongst the most vocal of all birds, calling continuously in most situations, so much so that they are only ever silent for specific reasons such as avoiding predators or when intruding on a rival's territory. Quiet contact calls are made while feeding to facilitate cohesion with others in their social group. Other calls are used for signalling alarm—a well-known example being the "chic-a-dee-dee" of North American species in the genus Poecile, the call which gives them their local common name, the chickadee. The call also serves as a rallying call to summon others to mob and harass the predator. The number of "dee" syllables at the end of the call increases with the level of danger the predator poses. Studies in the Japanese tit (Parus cinereus) have shown that different calls can encode messages such as "scan surroundings" or "approach", which can be combined to transmit compound messages. The order of these messages is meaningful, which has led researchers to liken the ordering of calls to syntax and grammar in human language. These birds have also been shown to create mental images for the call used to signal the presence of a snake, a cognitive ability that had previously been only attested in humans.

=== Diet and feeding ===
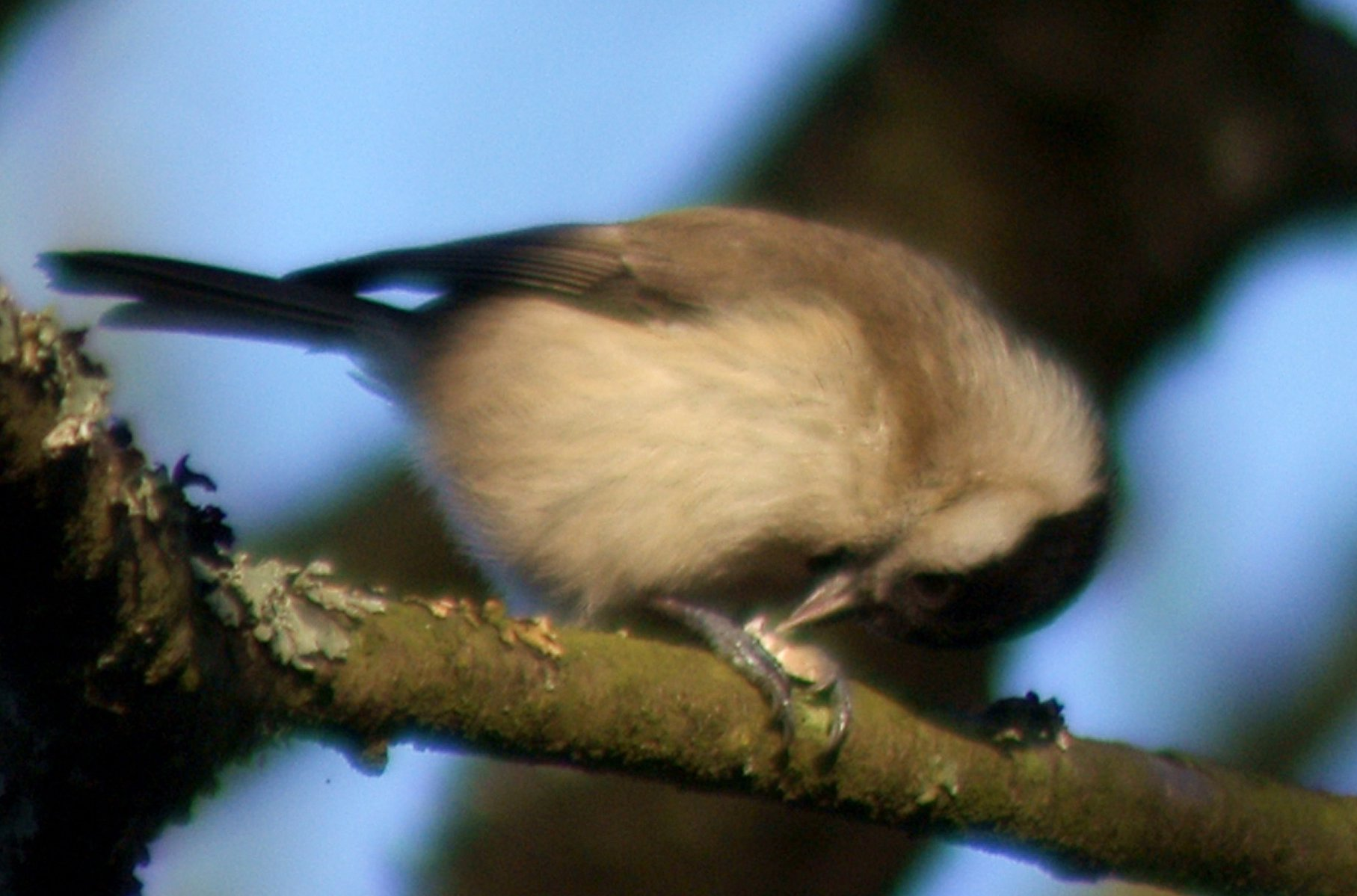
Hold-hammering is a common way for the family to deal with food items.

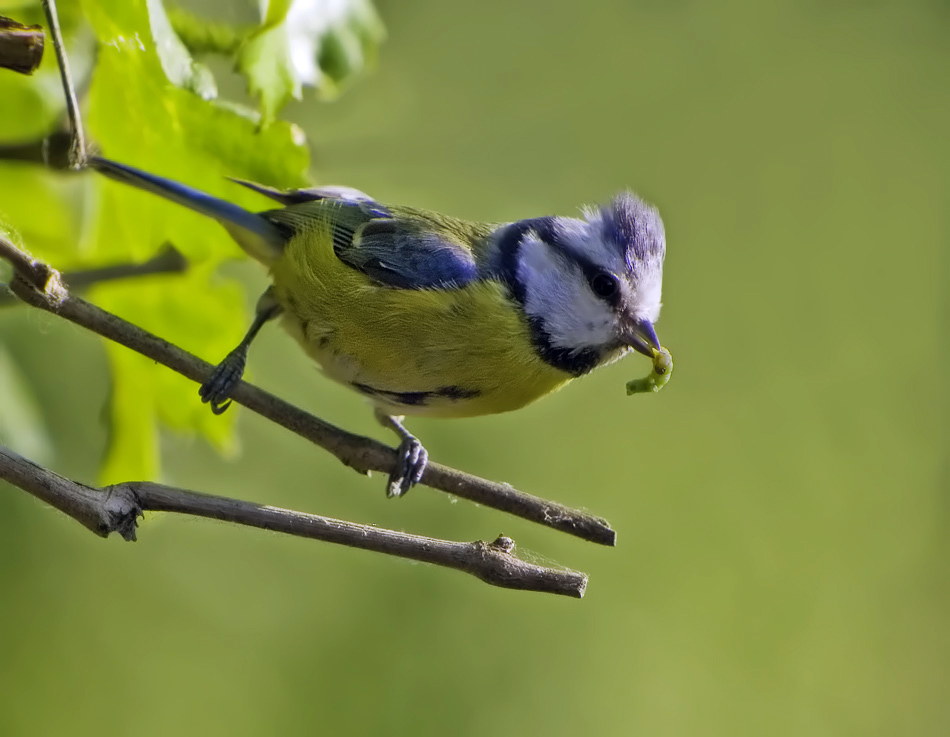
Blue tit with prey item

The tits are generalist insectivores that consume a wide range of small insects and other invertebrates, particularly small defoliating caterpillars. They also consume seeds and nuts, particularly in the winter. One characteristic method of foraging in the family is hanging, where they inspect a branch or twig and leaves from all angles while hanging upside down to feed. In areas where numerous species of tit coexist, different species forage in different parts of the tree, their niche determined in no small way by their morphology; larger species forage on the ground, medium-sized species foraging on larger branches, and the smallest species on the ends of branches. Having obtained larger prey items or seeds, tits engage in hold-hammering, where they hold the item between their feet and hammer it with their bill until it opens. In this fashion, they can even open hazelnuts in around 20 minutes. A number of genera engage in food caching, hoarding supplies of food during the winter.

=== Breeding ===
Tits are cavity-nesting birds, typically using trees, although Pseudopodoces builds a nest on the ground. Most tree-nesting tits excavate their nests, and clutch sizes are generally large for altricial birds, ranging from usually two eggs in the rufous-vented tit of the Himalayas to as many as 10 to 14 in the blue tit of Europe. In favourable conditions, this species had laid as many as 19 eggs, which is the largest clutch of any altricial bird. Most tits are multibrooded, a necessary strategy to cope with either the harsh winters in which they reside in the Holarctic or the extremely erratic conditions of tropical Africa, where typically a single pair cannot find enough food to rear even one nestling and in drought years breeding is likely to be futile.

Many African tit species, along with Pseudopodoces, are cooperative breeders, and even pair-breeding parids are often highly social and maintain stable flocks throughout the nonbreeding season.

Tits also have a variety of methods for attracting mates, primarily through their intricate, bouncing mating dance. Only the blue tit is typically polygynous; all other species are generally monogamous. Courtship feeding is typical of pair-breeding tits to deal with the cost of rearing their large broods.

== Systematics ==
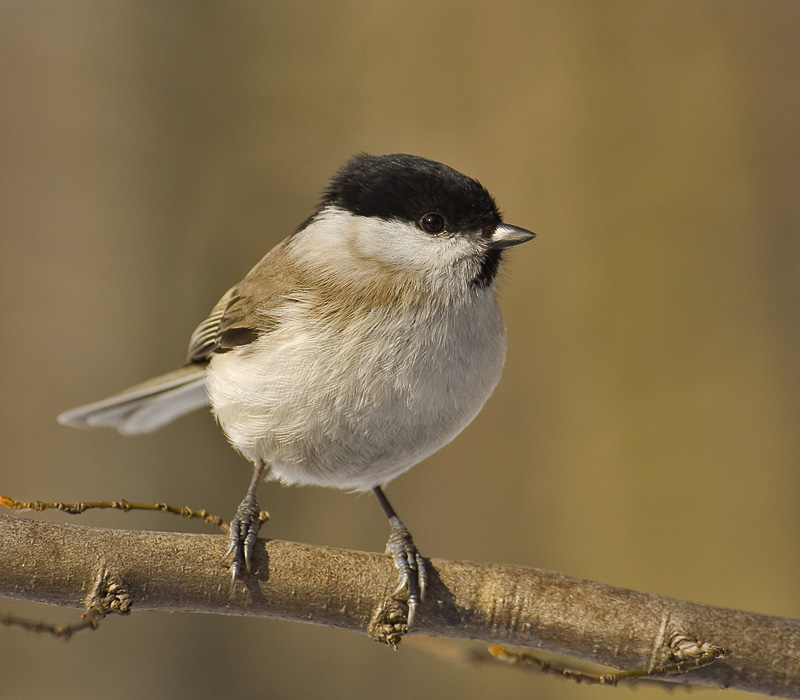
The marsh tit was once placed in the genus Parus, but has now been moved to the genus Poecile.

Recently, the large Parus group has been gradually split into several genera (as indicated below), initially by North American ornithological authorities and later elsewhere. Whereas in the mid-1990s, only Pseudopodoces, Baeolophus, Melanochlora, and Sylviparus were considered well-supported by the available data as distinct from Parus. Today, this arrangement is considered paraphyletic as indicated by mtDNA cytochrome b sequence analysis, and Parus is best restricted to the Parus major—Parus fasciiventer clade, and even the latter species' closest relatives might be considered a distinct genus.

In the Sibley-Ahlquist taxonomy, the family Paridae is much enlarged to include related groups such as the penduline tits and long-tailed tits, but while the former are quite close to the tits and could conceivably be included in that family together with the stenostirid "warblers", the long-tailed tits are not. Indeed, the yellow-browed tit and the sultan tit are possibly more distant to the tits than the penduline tits are. If the two current families are lumped into the Paridae, the tits would be a subfamily Parinae.

Alternatively, all tits—save the two monotypic genera discussed in the preceding section and possibly Cyanistes, but including Hume's ground tit—could be lumped in Parus. In any case, four major clades of "typical" tits can be recognized: the dark-capped chickadees and their relatives (Poecile including Sittiparus), the long-crested Baeolophus and Lophophanes species, the usually tufted, white-cheeked Periparus (including Pardaliparus) with more subdued coloration and finally Parus sensu stricto (including Melaniparus and Machlolophus). Still, the interrelationship of these, as well as the relationships of many species within the clades, are not well-resolved at all; analysis of morphology and biogeography probably gives a more robust picture than the available molecular data.

Tits have settled North America twice, probably at some time during the Early-Mid Pliocene. The first were the ancestors of Baeolophus, with chickadees arriving somewhat later.

The following cladogram shows the phylogeny of the Paridae. It is based on a molecular study by Ulf Johansson and collaborators that was published in 2013. The number of species in each genus is from the AviList checklist.

- Paridae
  - Cephalopyrus – Fire-capped tit
  - - Sylviparus – Yellow-browed tit
    - - Melanochlora – Sultan tit
      - - - Periparus – 6 species
          - - Baeolophus – 5 species
            - - Lophophanes – 2 species
              - - Sittiparus – 5 species
                - Poecile – 15 species
        - - Cyanistes – 3 species
          - - - - Pseudopodoces – Hume's groundpecker
                - Parus – 3 species
              - Machlolophus – 5 species
            - Melaniparus – 14 species

== Species in taxonomic order ==
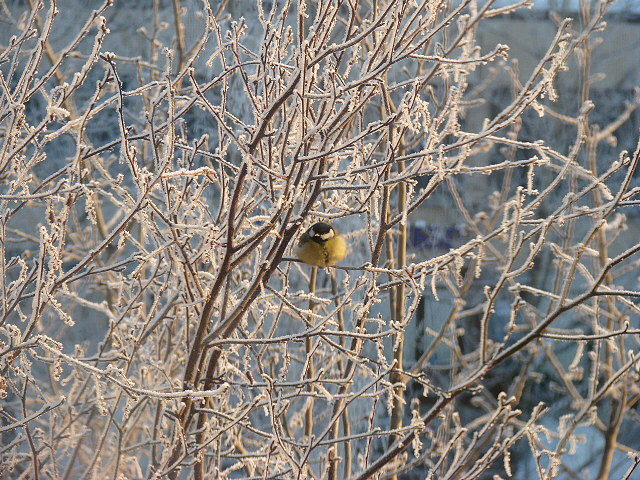
Tit in a winter tree

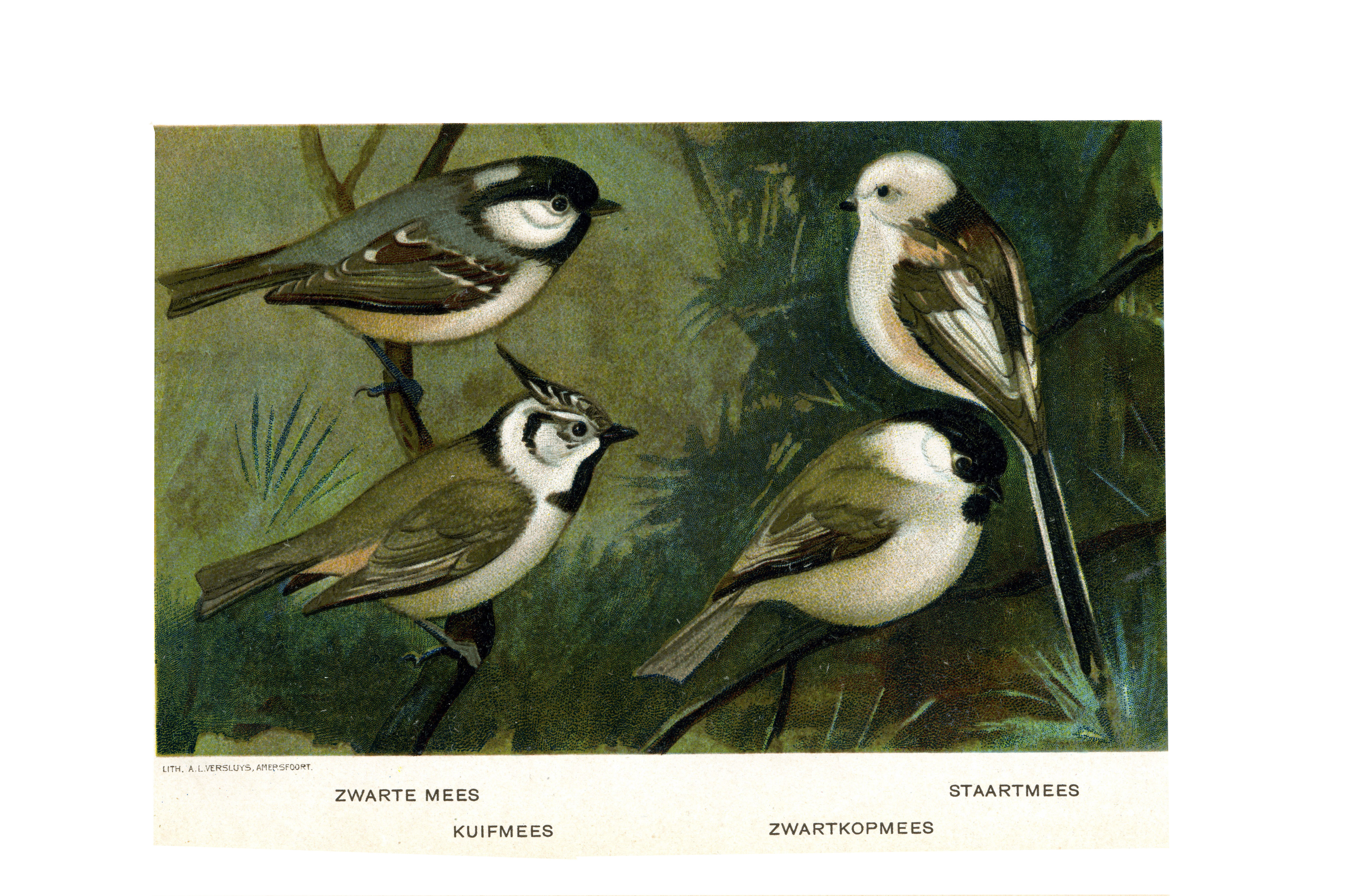
Four different tits, although the top-right bird, the long-tailed tit, is not a member of the Paridae

The family contains 62 species in 13 genera.

Image	Genus	Living species
	Cephalopyrus Bonaparte, 1854	Fire-capped tit Cephalopyrus flammiceps
	Sylviparus Burton, 1836	Yellow-browed tit, Sylviparus modestus
	Melanochlora Lesson, 1839	Sultan tit, Melanochlora sultanea
	Periparus Sélys Longchamps, 1884	Yellow-bellied tit, Periparus venustulus; Palawan tit, Periparus amabilis; Elegant tit, Periparus elegans; Coal tit, Periparus ater; Rufous-naped tit, Periparus rufonuchalis; Rufous-vented tit, Periparus rubidiventris
	Lophophanes Kaup, 1829	Crested tit, Lophophanes cristatus; Grey-crested tit, Lophophanes dichrous
	Baeolophus Cabanis, 1850	Bridled titmouse, Baeolophus wollweberi; Oak titmouse, Baeolophus inornatus; Juniper titmouse, Baeolophus ridgwayi; Tufted titmouse, Baeolophus bicolor; Black-crested titmouse, Baeolophus atricristatus
	Sittiparus Selys-Longchamps, 1884	Varied tit, Sittiparus varius; Owston's tit, Sittiparus owstoni; Iriomote tit, Sittiparus olivaceus; Chestnut-bellied tit, Sittiparus castaneoventris; White-fronted tit, Sittiparus semilarvatus
	Poecile Kaup, 1829	White-browed tit, Poecile superciliosus; Sombre tit, Poecile lugubris; Père David's tit, Poecile davidi; Marsh tit, Poecile palustris; Caspian tit, Poecile hyrcanus; Black-bibbed tit, Poecile hypermelaenus; Willow tit, Poecile montanus; Sichuan tit Poecile weigoldicus; Carolina chickadee, Poecile carolinensis; Black-capped chickadee, Poecile atricapillus; Mountain chickadee, Poecile gambeli; Mexican chickadee, Poecile sclateri; Grey-headed chickadee, Poecile cinctus; Boreal chickadee, Poecile hudsonicus; Chestnut-backed chickadee, Poecile rufescens
	Cyanistes Kaup, 1829	African blue tit, Cyanistes teneriffae (formerly included in C. caeruleus); Eurasian blue tit, Cyanistes caeruleus; Azure tit, Cyanistes cyanus
	Pseudopodoces Zarudny & Loudon, 1902	Ground tit, Pseudopodoces humilis (previously "Hume's ground jay" in crow family Corvidae).
	Parus Linnaeus, 1758	Great tit, Parus major; Cinereous tit, Parus cinereus (split from P. major); Green-backed tit, Parus monticolus
	Machlolophus Cabanis, 1850	White-naped tit, Machlolophus nuchalis; Yellow tit, Machlolophus holsti; Himalayan black-lored tit, Machlolophus xanthogenys; Indian black-lored tit, Machlolophus aplonotus; Yellow-cheeked tit, Machlolophus spilonotus
	Melaniparus Bonaparte, 1850	White-shouldered black tit, Melaniparus guineensis; White-winged black tit, Melaniparus leucomelas; Southern black tit, Melaniparus niger; Carp's tit, Melaniparus carpi; White-bellied tit, Melaniparus albiventris; White-backed black tit, Melaniparus leuconotus; Dusky tit, Melaniparus funereus; Rufous-bellied tit, Melaniparus rufiventris; Red-throated tit, Melaniparus fringillinus; Stripe-breasted tit, Melaniparus fasciiventer; Acacia tit or Somali tit, Melaniparus thruppi; Miombo tit, Melaniparus griseiventris; Ashy tit, Melaniparus cinerascens; Grey tit, Melaniparus afer
