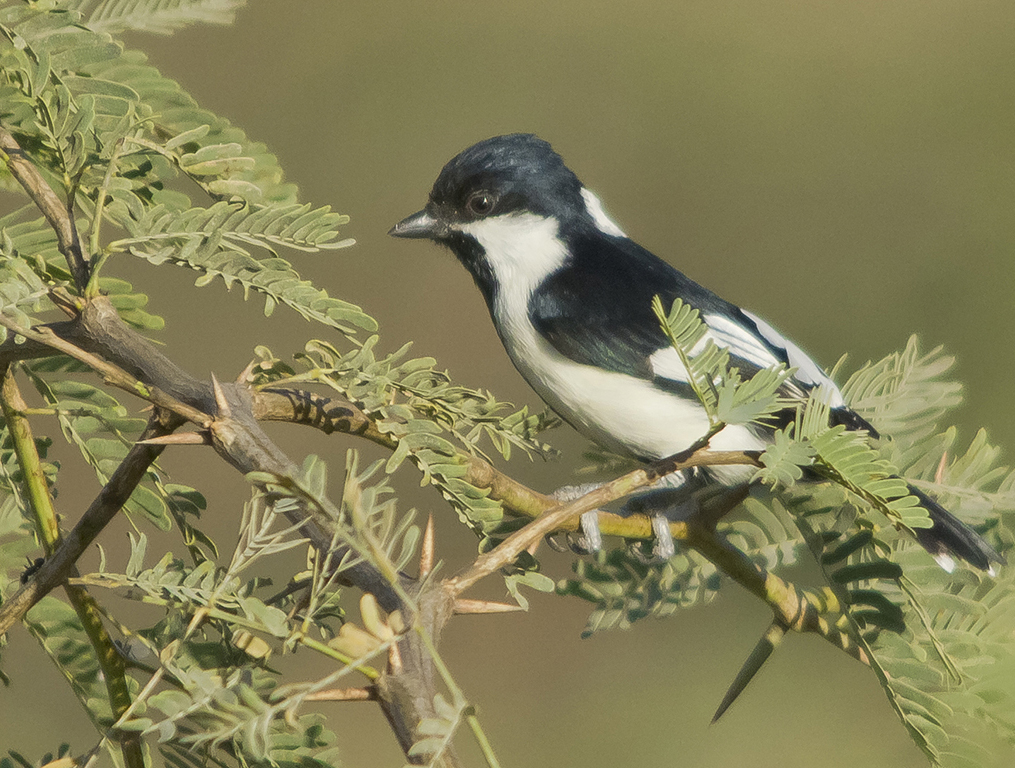
- Foraging on a Prosopis juliflora

Conservation status
- Near Threatened (IUCN 3.1)

Scientific classification
- Kingdom: Animalia
- Phylum: Chordata
- Class: Aves
- Order: Passeriformes
- Family: Paridae
- Genus: Machlolophus
- Species: M. nuchalis

Binomial name
- Machlolophus nuchalis (Jerdon, 1845)
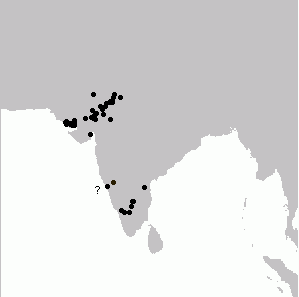

Audio
- Calls

= White-naped tit =

Species of bird

The white-naped tit (Machlolophus nuchalis), sometimes called white-winged tit, is a passerine bird in the tit family Paridae. It is endemic to India where it is found in dry thorn scrub forest in two disjunct populations, in western India and southern India. Its specific name nuchalis means 'of the nuchal, nape'.

This species is hard to mistake with its contrasting black and white patterns without the grey wing coverts and back of the partly sympatric cinereous tit (Parus cinereus). This species is very patchily distributed and is considered to be Near Threatened especially because loss of its preferred acacia habitats and continuing incursion of invasive Neltuma chilensis and Lantana camara trees.

== Taxonomy ==
- - - - - Pseudopodoces humilis
        - - Parus monticolus
          - - Parus major
            - Parus cinereus
            - - Parus bokharensis
              - Parus minor
      - Machlolophus
        - M. nuchalis
        - - M. holsti
          - - - M. aplonotus
              - M. xanthogenys
          - M. spilonotus
    - Melaniparus
  - Cyanistes

Relationships with other species in the region

The white-naped tit was formerly one of the many species in the genus Parus but was moved to Machlolophus after a molecular phylogenetic analysis published in 2013 showed that the members of the new genus formed a distinct clade.

== Description ==
The only pied (black-and-white) tit in India, this species has the wing-coverts, crown, sides of head, chin, throat, a ventral band running down the breast and belly to the vent black. The cheeks below the eye, the ear-coverts and a patch on the nape are white. The wing has white on the outer primaries and the base of the secondaries. The last tertiaries are completely white. The two outer tail feathers are white while the next has the outer web white and the remaining black. The white of the flanks can be suffused with yellow.

== Distribution and habitat ==
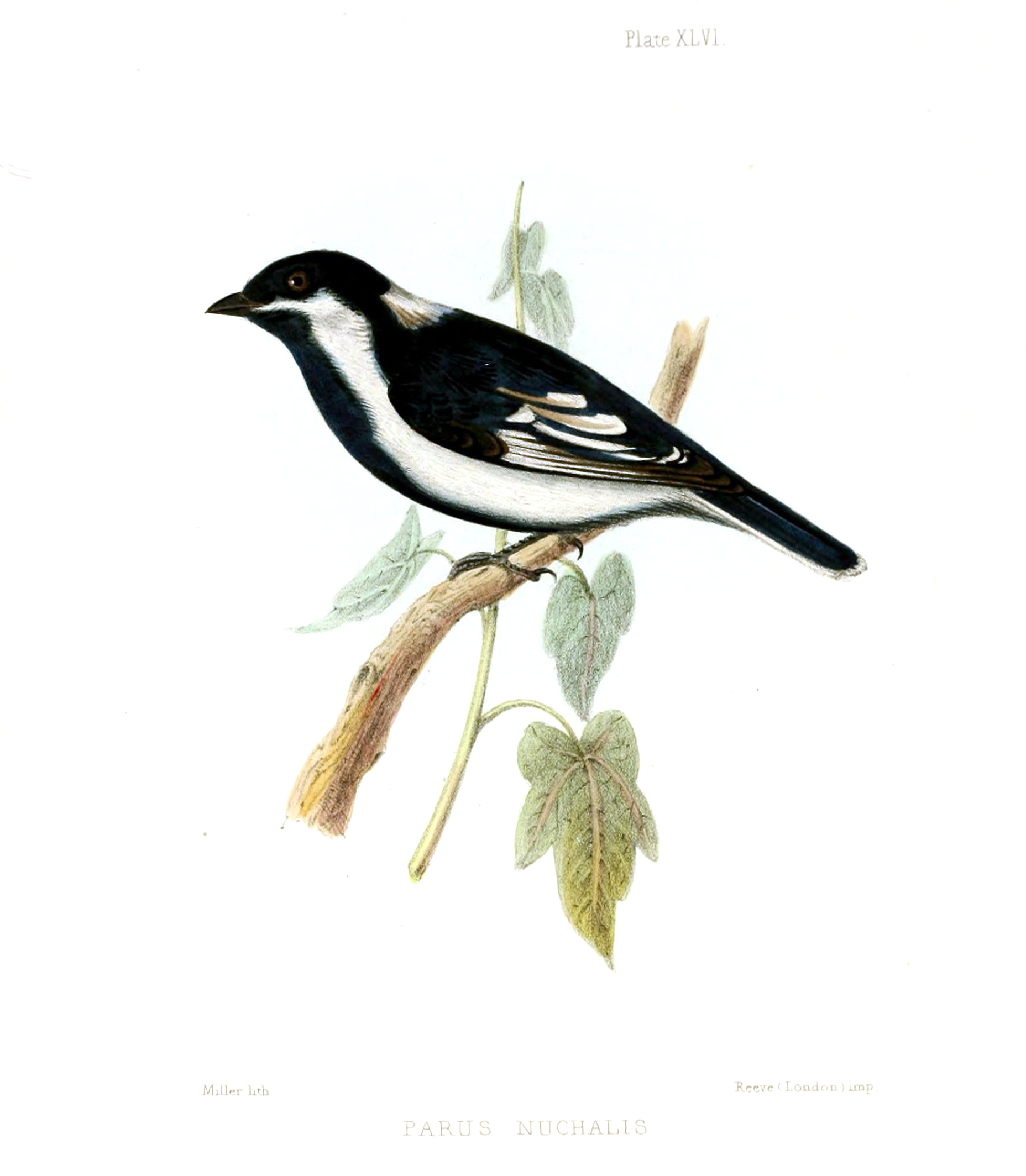
From Jerdon's Illustrations of Indian Ornithology (1847)

This species was discovered in the Eastern Ghats near Nellore by T C Jerdon who received a specimen from a local hunter. A specimen was later obtained in 1863 from near Bangalore and for a long time the species was not observed anywhere in southern India. A O Hume had suggested in that the two populations might represent different species. The southern population was subsequently noted when Salim Ali collected specimens from the Biligirirangan Hills. The species occurs in the nearby Kaveri valley area where Parus cinereus stupae is also found. The species has also been reported from the Chittoor district of Andhra Pradesh. Salim Ali had claimed that the two species were mutually exclusive, however there is no support for this. The distribution in western India is larger and better known, ranging mainly in areas of Kutch and extending into parts of Rajasthan and Haryana. A specimen in the British Museum marked as being from Bootan (Bhutan) is considered to be in error. Records from Wynaad, Anshi National Park and Dharwad have also been considered doubtful.

== Behaviour and ecology ==
These birds are believed to live at very low densities in small numbers. They are shy and are best detected by their calls which have been described as musical whistling notes tee-whi-whi or see pit-pit-pit-pit. They forage within well-established territories which pairs will defend from others of their own species. Both males and females make use of roost hollows and individuals have been observed to use the same roost for more than six years. The male of a pair accompanies the female to its roost before proceeds to his own roost site. The birds move their head from side to side in a nearby bush and then fly into the roost cavity, turning around at the entrance so that they can look out and fly if threatened. The birds feed on insects and the berries of Salvadora oleoides. They may also obtain nectar from the flowers of Capparis aphylla and will sometimes visit rainwater puddles to drink. The breeding season in Rajasthan is during the monsoons, from May to August. The nest is a pad of fibre and hair (sometimes plucked from roadkill) placed inside a cavity typically on a tree. They choose natural hollows as well as cavities made by woodpeckers and coppersmith barbets. Nests have been found in old trees of Salvadora persica and Boswellia serrata. The clutch size is not known but adults with three young have been observed. The female develops a brood-patch and it is not known if the male incubates. Males have been seen carrying food to the female at nest. Both parents take part in care of the chicks. The chicks are fed mainly with non-hairy caterpillars, the parents may bring food as late as 2000 Hrs in the evening. In Gujarat it has been said to be dependent on old woodpeckers nest holes, especially those made by yellow-crowned woodpeckers, which are used both for nesting and roosting. Suggestions that the species might migrate from western to southern India have not found support and birds (including juveniles) have been seen in southern India during summer. Birds ringed in western India have been recaptured within a radius of 5 to 7 km. Breeding has not been studied in the southern population.

This species is said to have undergone a rapid population decline in the recent past. The habitat of dense Acacia scrub is severely degraded and fragmented in western India especially due to the collection of old branches with potential nest holes for firewood.
