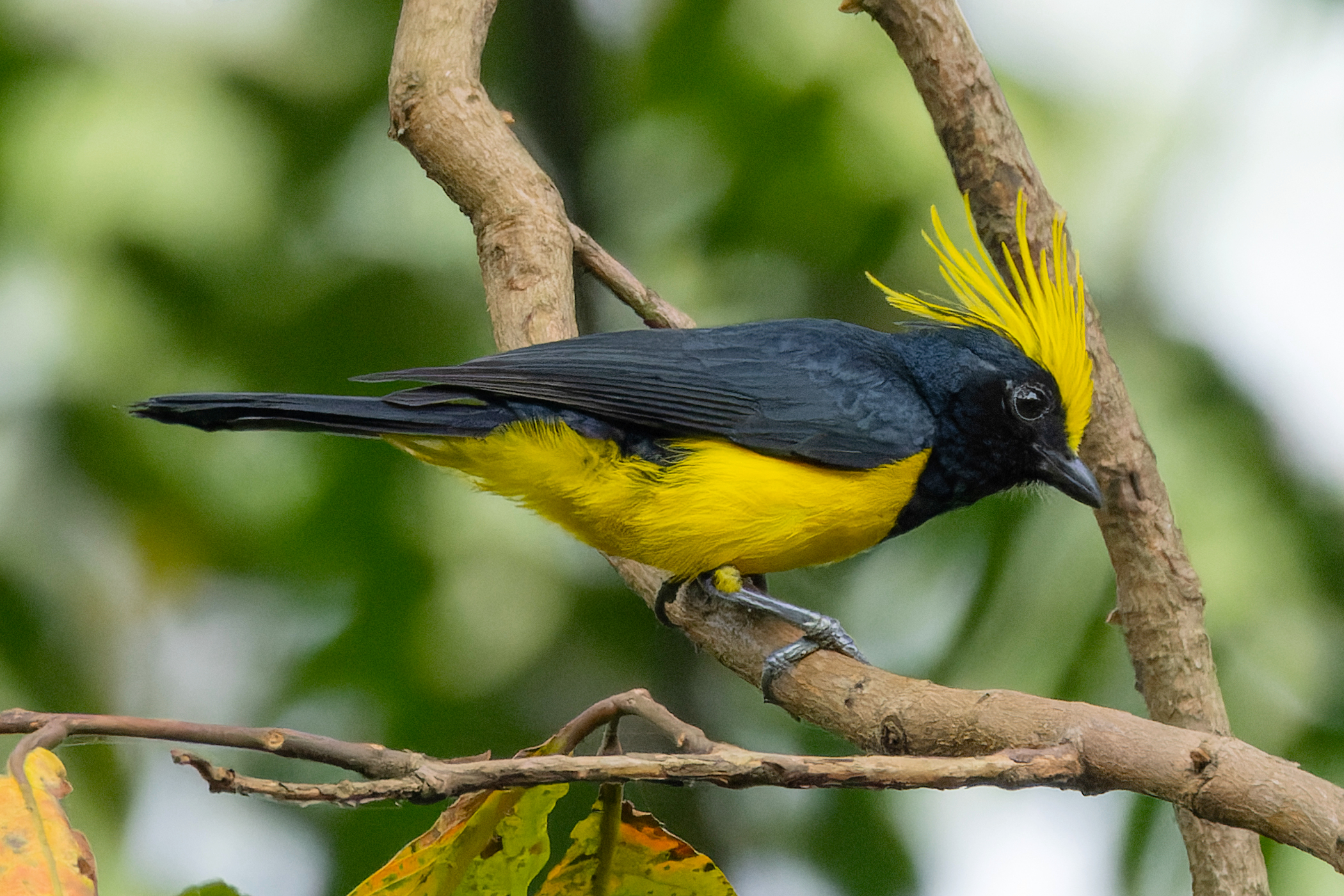
- Nominate M. s. sultanea near Darjeeling, India.

Conservation status
- Least Concern (IUCN 3.1)

Scientific classification
- Kingdom: Animalia
- Phylum: Chordata
- Class: Aves
- Order: Passeriformes
- Family: Paridae
- Genus: Melanochlora; Lesson, 1839
- Species: M. sultanea

Binomial name
- Melanochlora sultanea (Hodgson, 1837)
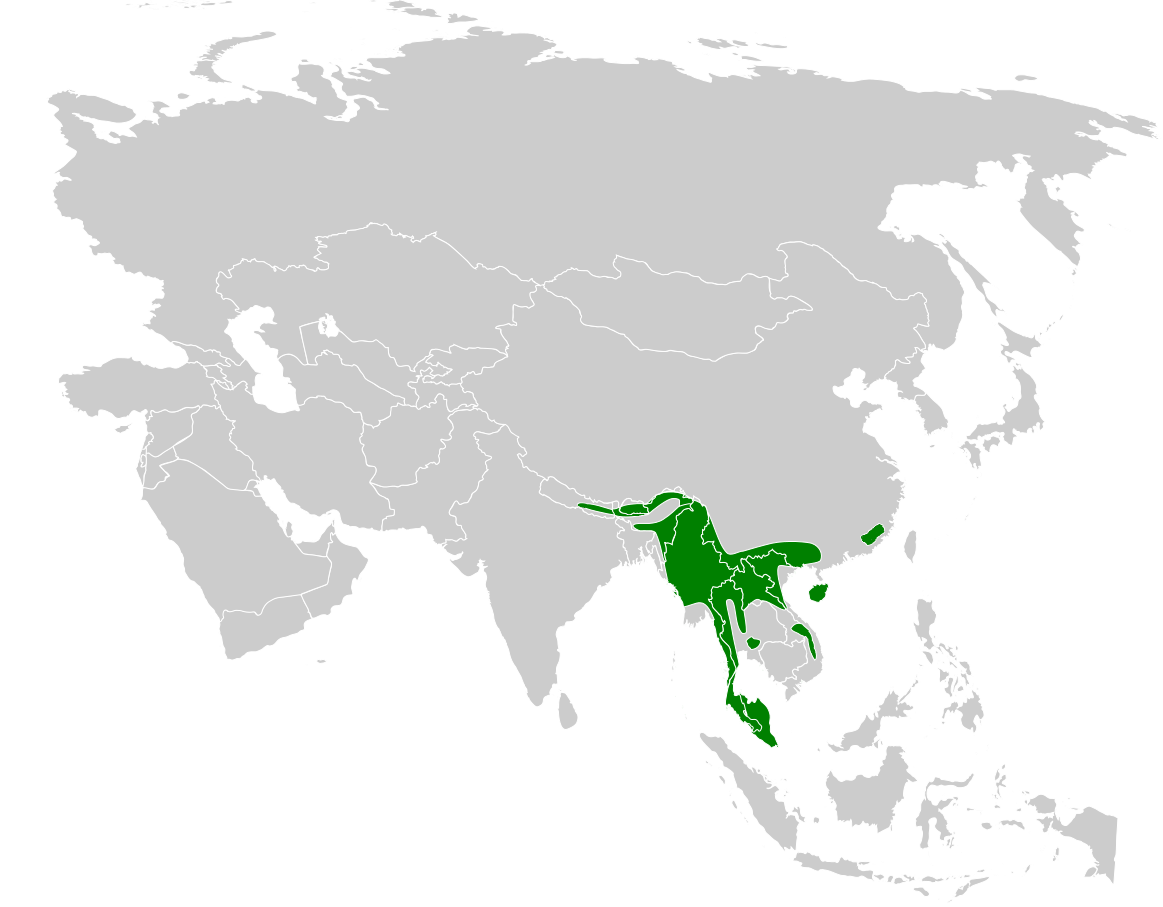
- Sultan tit distribution

= Sultan tit =

Species of bird

The sultan tit (Melanochlora sultanea) is an Asian forest bird with black upperparts plumage and yellow underparts, dark bill, and (depending on subspecies) a yellow or black crest. The sexes are similar, though the female has slightly duller plumage with greenish-black upperparts and throat. The young bird is duller than the adult and has a shorter crest. It is the only member of the monotypic genus Melanochlora, which is fairly distinct from other tits, third-basal in the family Paridae after Cephalopyrus and Sylviparus.

== Behaviour ==
=== Feeding ===
The sultan tit forages mostly on invertebrates and larvae. The food sources are grasshoppers, mantises and web spiders, in addition to berries, other fruits and seeds. The search for food is mostly in the tree canopy, but sometimes also in higher undergrowth and bamboo areas.

=== Company ===
Sultan tits appear often in small associations of up to twelve individuals and socialize with other species like warblers.

== Description ==
The male has the forehead and crown with the crest brilliant yellow (except glossy black in one subspecies); the whole upper plumage, sides of the head and neck, chin, throat, and breast-deep black glossed with green, the edges of the feathers of the upper plumage with a metallic lustre, and the outermost tail-feathers tipped with white; lower plumage from the breast downwards deep yellow, the thighs barred or mottled with white. The recumbent crest is raised when the bird is alert or alarmed.

The female has the yellow parts duller; the upper plumage and sides of the head dark greenish-brown; the chin and throat glossed dark olive-green; wings and tail dull black; the feathers of the upper plumage edged with metallic green.

The young resemble the female, but in the youngest stage the bright edges to the plumage of the upper parts are absent, and the greater wing coverts are edged with white.

They forage in the mid and upper canopy singly or in small groups mainly and feed mainly on insects but sometimes feed on figs. Their loud calls with short repeated and variable whistling notes have a tit-like quality. The flight is slow and fluttering.

The bill is black; the mouth dark; the eyelids grey; the iris dark brown; the legs are grey; the claws dark horn. It is the largest species of tit, 20–20.5 cm (7.9–8.1 in) long; the tail is 8.2–9.9 cm (3.2–3.9 in) long; the wing 9.4–11.5 cm (3.7–4.5 in); the tarsus 2.1–2.6 cm (0.83–1.02 in); the bill from the gape 1.5–1.8 cm (0.59–0.71 in). The weight is from 34 to 49 g (1.2 to 1.7 oz).

== Taxonomy and distribution ==
There are four subspecies:

Image	Scientific name	Distribution	Notes
Mahananda Wildlife Sanctuary, Darjeeling, India	M. s. sultanea (Hodgson, 1837)	In the lower foothills of the Himalaya from central Nepal east to northeastern India and northeastern Bangladesh, Myanmar, northern Thailand and southwestern China (southern Yunnan); at submontane altitudes up to 1,500 m, rarely 1,900 m.	Crest and underparts vivid yellow.
Kaeng Krachan National Park, Phetchaburi, Thailand	M. s. flavocristata (Lafresnaye, 1837)	Hainan, northern Vietnam, northern Laos, central and southern Thailand and the Malay Peninsula; intergrades with M. s. sultanea in the northwest of its range; generally below 1,200 m but rarely up to 2,000 m.	Similar to nominate M. s. sultanea but crest slightly shorter.
	M. s. seorsa Bangs, 1924	Southeastern China in Zhejiang and Fujian.	Similar to nominate M. s. sultanea but yellow plumage slightly paler; some individuals have fime black streaks in the yellow crest. Birds in southern China (Guangxi) and northern Vietnam show plumage intermediate between M. s. seorsa and M. s. sultanea.
Kon Tum, Vietnam	M. s. gayeti Delacour & Jabouille, 1925 (named after the collector M.V. Gayet-Laroche)	Central and southern Vietnam, from Da Nang south to Da Lat, and adjacent southeasternmost Laos; 200–1900 m altitude, commonest around 1,400 m.	Slightly smaller than the other subspecies; crest glossy black with no yellow.

- - Remizidae
  - - Cephalopyrus flammiceps
    - - Sylviparus modestus
      - - Melanochlora sultanea
        - - - - Pardaliparus
              - Periparus
            - - - Baeolophus
              - - Lophophanes
                - - Sittiparus
                  - Poecile
          - - Cyanistes
            - - - - Pseudopodoces
                  - - Parus monticolus
                    - Parus major
                - Machlolophus
              - Melaniparus

Phylogeny of the Paridae with the position of Melanochlora

In 1890, Richard Bowdler Sharpe considered this species as a member of the former subfamily Liotrichinae within the Timaliidae. A 2005 study found that they appear to have distinctive mtDNA cytochrome b sequences, suggesting that they might not belong to the Paridae unless the penduline tits are included, but more recent, more detailed studies have clarified its placement in a near-basal position in the family Paridae and separate from the penduline tits.

== Ecology ==
It frequents larger trees in small, often mixed-species flocks. In some forest areas such as the Buxa Tiger Reserve, the density has been estimated at around 15 per square kilometre.

Sultan tits are vocal with several calls including a rattling "chi-dip, tri-trip", harsh explosive hissing calls and squeaky repeated "wheet" whistles.

The breeding season in India is April to July. The clutch is of five to seven eggs laid inside a lined tree cavity. The birds feed on caterpillars and sometimes small berries. They show an unusual behaviour of panicking in captivity when they encounter unusual noise or other species; this is said to be unlike that of typical Paridae members. Unlike other Paridae, their nostrils are exposed and not covered by feathers.

Widely distributed within suitable habitats throughout its large range, the sultan tit is evaluated as Least Concern on the IUCN Red List of Threatened Species.
