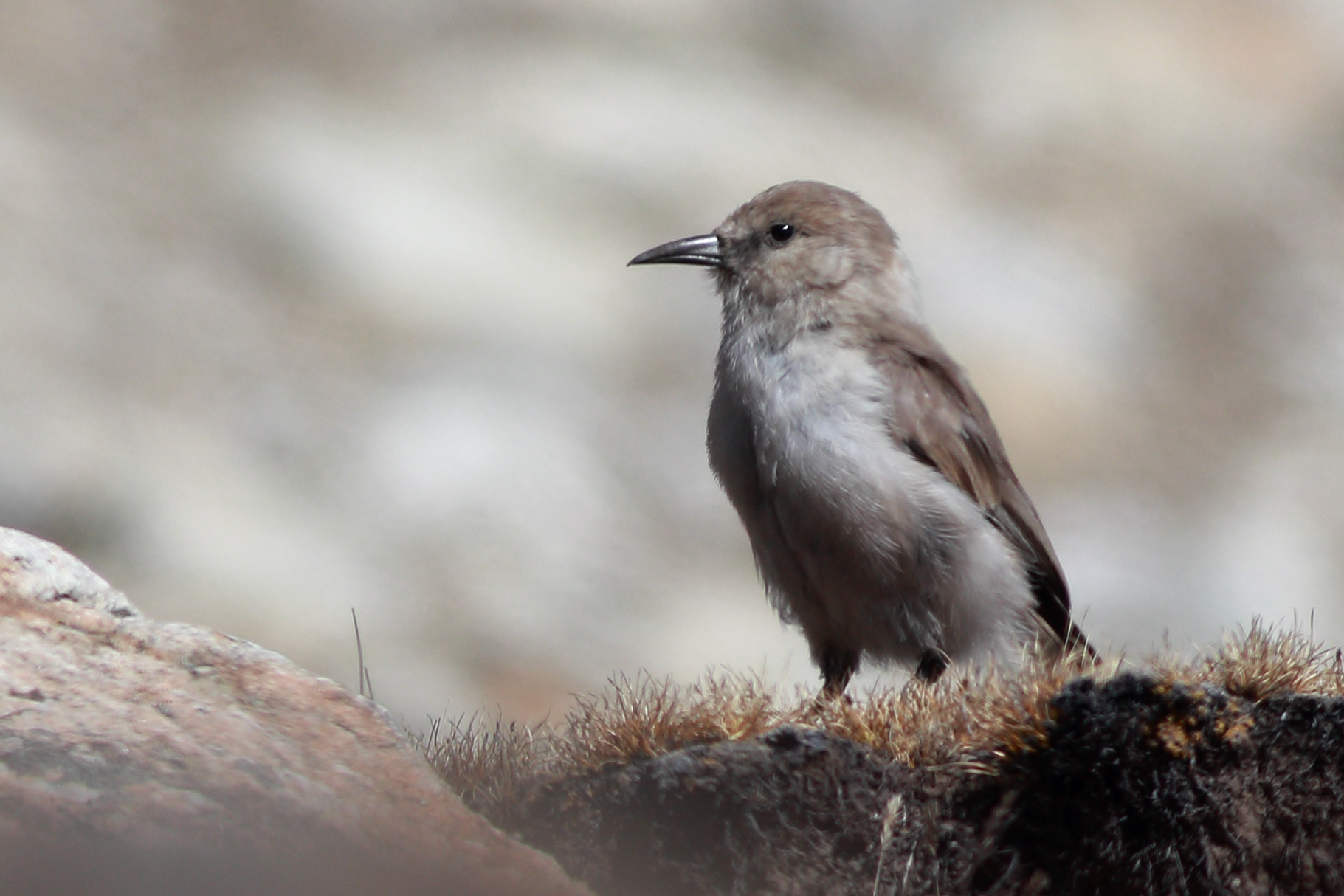

Conservation status
- Least Concern (IUCN 3.1)

Scientific classification
- Kingdom: Animalia
- Phylum: Chordata
- Class: Aves
- Order: Passeriformes
- Family: Paridae
- Genus: Pseudopodoces; Zarudny & Loudon, 1902
- Species: P. humilis

Binomial name
- Pseudopodoces humilis (Hume, 1871)
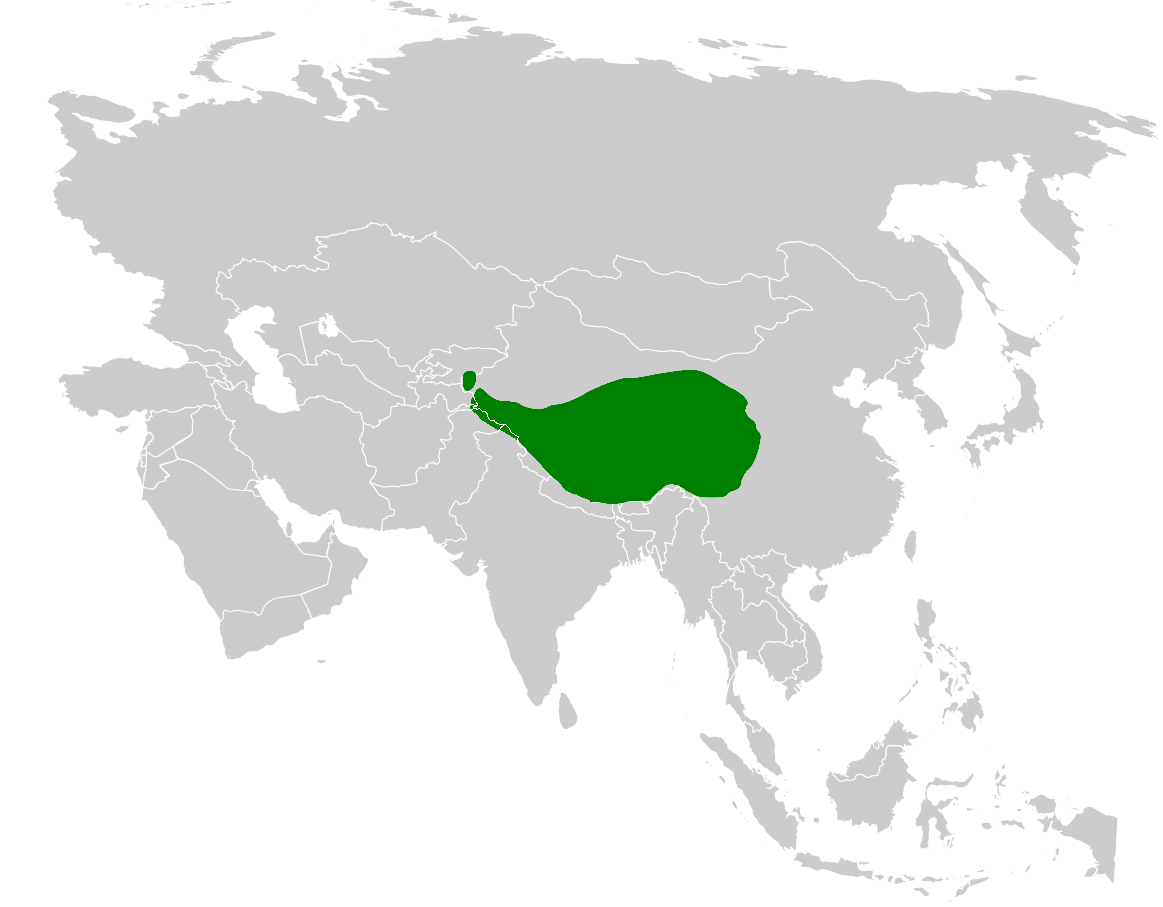
- Distribution

Synonyms
- Podoces humilis (protonym); Parus humilis

= Ground tit =

Species of bird

The ground tit, Tibetan ground tit, or Hume's ground tit (Pseudopodoces humilis) is a bird of the Tibetan plateau north of the Himalayas. The peculiar appearance confused ornithologists who in the past variously called it Hume's groundpecker, Hume's ground jay or Tibetan ground jay on the assumption it belonged to the family Corvidae that includes the crows and jays. Although morphologically confusing, the species has since been identified using molecular sequence comparisons as being a member of the tit family (Paridae), and is now treated as the only species in the genus Pseudopodoces. It is found in the Tibetan Plateau of China, India, Nepal & Bhutan.

== Description ==
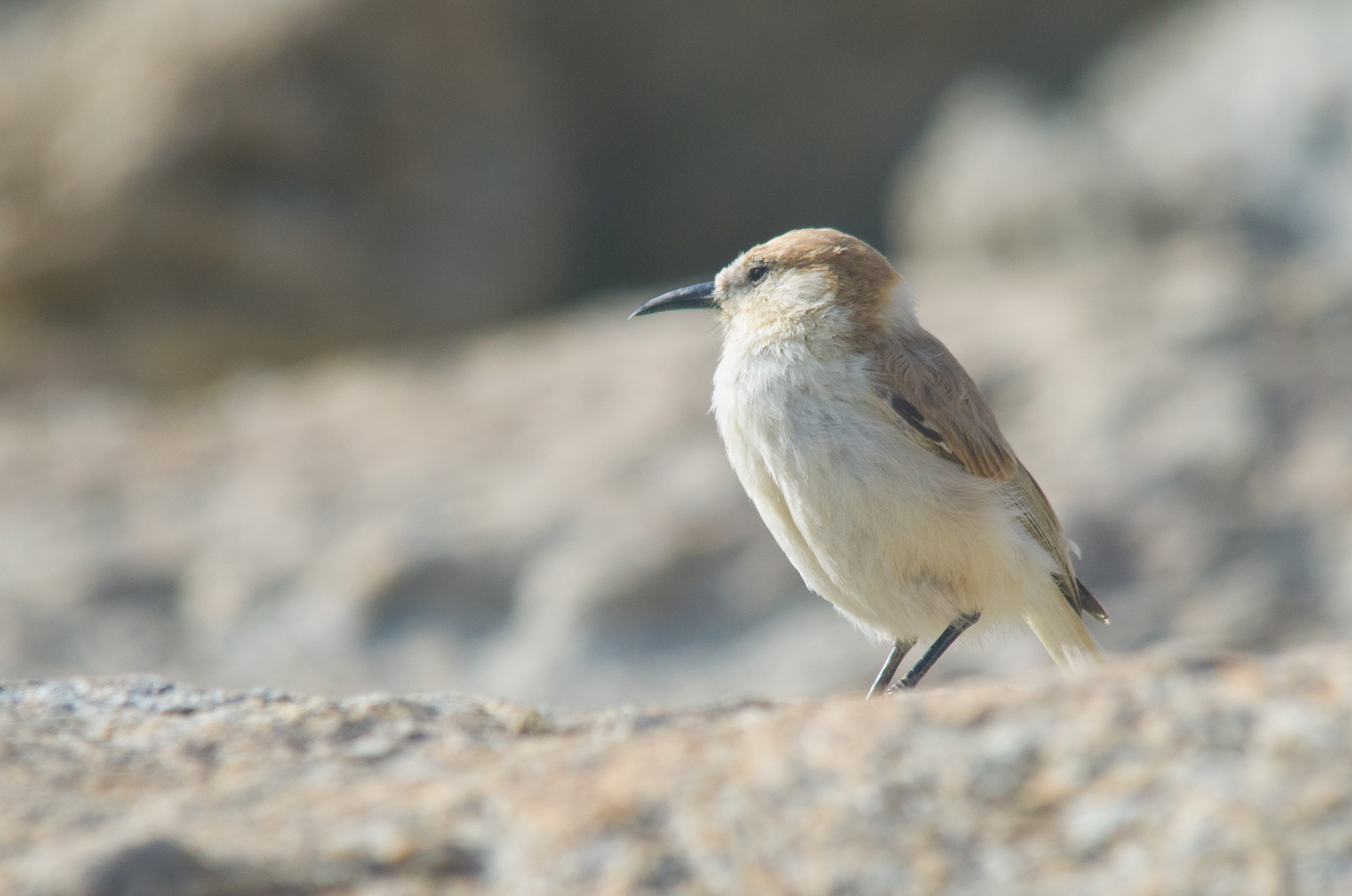
Ground tit at Tso Kar, Ladakh.

Pseudopodoces is somewhat similar in appearance to the unrelated ground jays (Podoces), but much smaller, about the size of a house sparrow (Passer domesticus), and lacks any conspicuous markings. More distinctly however, it resembles a wheatear (Oenanthe) in habitus, but lacks black feathers, and has a strong and slightly downcurved bill resembling that of a chough (Pyrrhocorax) in shape (though not in colour). Its soft, lax body plumage is extremely cryptic in its natural habitat. The underside is a greyish-fawn in colour, with a tawny hue. The upper parts are mostly a darker fawn-brown, with the central rectrices and the primary remiges a little darker still; the head is coloured like the underside, with a darker cap and light nape patch, fairly reminiscent of some tits, especially those in the genera Parus sensu stricto and Periparus. The bill, legs and feet are black. Males and females look alike.

The voice is described as a plaintive whistling, cheep-cheep-cheep-cheep and it also has a two syllable finch-like call.

== Systematics ==
- - Remizidae
  - - Cephalopyrus flammiceps
    - - Sylviparus modestus
      - - Melanochlora sultanea
        - - - - Pardaliparus
              - Periparus
            - - - Baeolophus
              - - Lophophanes
                - - Sittiparus
                  - Poecile
          - - Cyanistes
            - - - - Pseudopodoces
                  - - Parus monticolus
                    - Parus major
                - Machlolophus
              - Melaniparus

Phylogeny of the Paridae with the position of Pseudopodoces highlighted

The ground tit was traditionally considered a relative of the ground jays (Podoces), based on its voice and habits. Its autapomorphies had puzzled 20th century ornithologists, but due to its remote range and undistinguished appearance, it was barely studied and not suspected to be anything besides an aberrant ground jay for more than 100 years after its description by Hume. In 1978 and 1989 however, two studies of its anatomy determined that, although unassignable to any family back then due to its peculiar adaptations, it appeared to not be a corvid, but an unrelated songbird of the infraorder today known as Passerida.

From 2003 onwards, osteological, mtDNA and nDNA sequence and other biochemical data has firmly allied it with the tits and chickadees (Paridae). In fact, genetic evidence suggested that it is a closer relative of the great tit and its relatives in the genus Parus sensu stricto, than to the chickadees and their relatives of the genus Poecile.

== Ecology ==
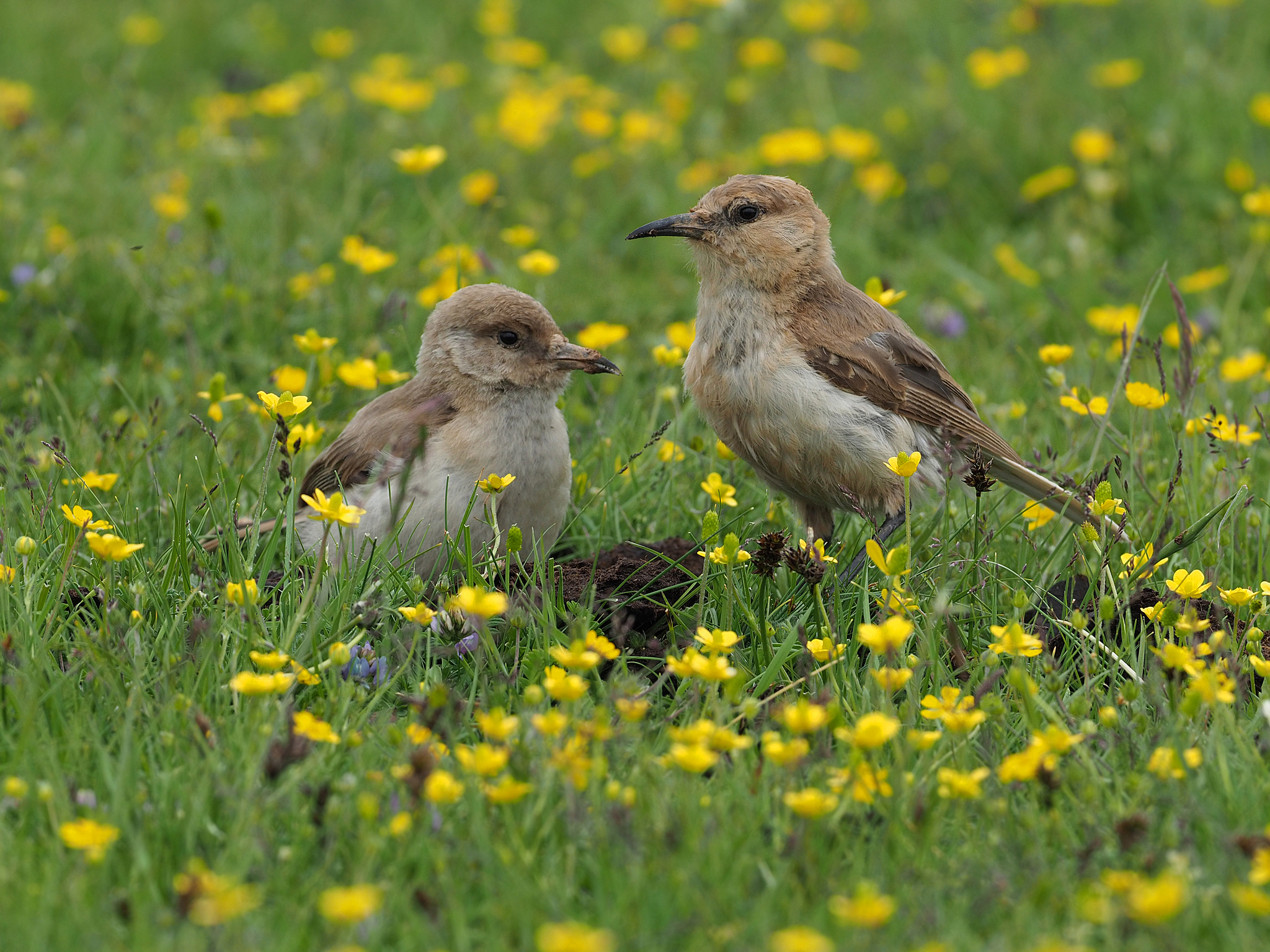
Adult (right, in post-breeding moult) and juvenile in July, Qinghai, China

It occurs across the Tibetan Plateau of China and the neighbouring areas of western Sichuan and Gansu. The ground tit inhabits open alpine steppe and sometimes more arid regions with small scattered shrubs, rarely if ever occurring lower than 3,000 metres above sea level. It is not found any place where dense vegetation (especially trees) predominates. The flight is not strong and it flies low over the ground preferring to run or jump out of the way if approached which it does very quickly. It moves on the ground in unpredictable hops and bounces which can be quite long; jumps of three times the bird's length are achieved without assistance by the wings, rather than striding or running like Podoces ground jays. Observers have compared the sight of a ground tit moving along to a small greyish-brown rubber ball.

It obtains food on the ground, eating a wide range of arthropod prey, often gathered by probing yak (Bos grunniens) dung and turning it over to flush the prey out. It also peers into rock crevices and into holes in the ground in its search for food. Individuals have been observed to poke mud in and near puddles like hoopoes (Upupa epops). In general the bill is extensively used for digging, much like the similarly-shaped though larger bill of the red-billed chough (Pyrrhocorax pyrrhocorax). If chased by a bird of prey or other predator, it will bolt straight down the nearest hole like a rodent until the danger has passed. They are frequently found near colonies of pikas (Ochotona). Though the birds and the mammals probably benefit from each other's vigilance, their association is most likely less due to a strong mutualism, but rather because both prefer habitat with similar ground cover and soil.

The nest is rather unusual for that of a passerine, being built inside a burrow which the birds excavate themselves. It is usually dug horizontally into a bank or wall of earth, and can reach a depth of 1.8 metres. The nest is positioned at the end of this in a small chamber and typically consists of a tiny amount of wool placed onto a grass base. The 4–6 eggs are pure white and the young stay with their parents for some time after fledging; half-grown young are still fed by their parents on occasion as late as August. Cooperative breeding occurs in this species, with monogamous pairs frequently having at least one male helper who are yearlings which remain on the natal territory. This behaviour is thought to occur as a result of there being a shortage of males in the population.

The ground tit is not migratory, but may descend to lower altitudes in valleys during the winter. In addition to digging nesting burrows, ground tits frequently dig roosting burrows to use during the coldest months.
