= Black-lored tit =

The black-lored tit has been split into two species:

- Himalayan black-lored tit, Parus xanthogenys
- Indian black-lored tit, Parus aplonotus
