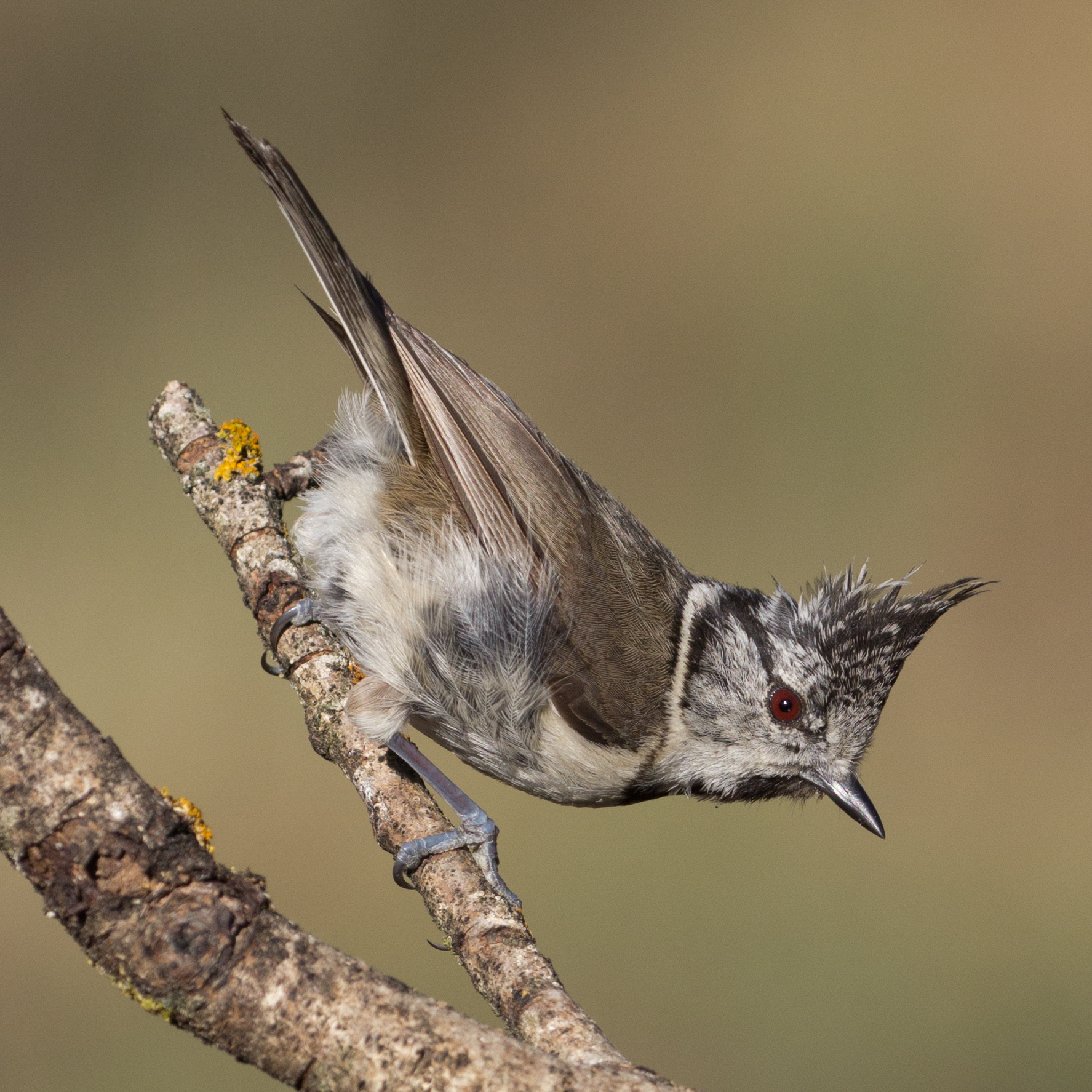
- A crested tit in Spain

Conservation status
- Least Concern (IUCN 3.1)

Scientific classification
- Kingdom: Animalia
- Phylum: Chordata
- Class: Aves
- Order: Passeriformes
- Family: Paridae
- Genus: Lophophanes
- Species: L. cristatus

Binomial name
- Lophophanes cristatus (Linnaeus, 1758)
- Range of L. cristatus Resident

Synonyms
- Parus cristatus Linnaeus, 1758

= Crested tit =

Species of bird

Bird recorded in Scotland

The crested tit or European crested tit (Lophophanes cristatus) is a passerine bird in the tit family Paridae. It is a widespread and common resident breeder in coniferous forests throughout central and northern Europe and in deciduous woodland in France and the Iberian Peninsula. In Great Britain, it is mainly restricted to the ancient pinewoods of Inverness and Strathspey in Scotland, and rarely strays far from its haunts. A few vagrant crested tits have been seen in England. It is resident, and most individuals do not migrate.

== Taxonomy ==
The crested tit was formally described in 1758 by the Swedish naturalist Carl Linnaeus in the tenth edition of his Systema Naturae under the binomial name Parus cristatus. Linnaeus specified the type locality as Europe, but this was restricted to Sweden by German naturalist Johann Jakob Kaup in 1905. The crested tit is now placed together with grey-crested tit in the genus Lophophanes that was introduced in 1829 by the German naturalist Johann Jakob Kaup. The current genus name, Lophophanes, is from the Ancient Greek lophos, "crest", and phaino, "to show". The specific cristatus is Latin for "crested".

This species was formerly placed in Parus, but the distinctness of Lophophanes is well supported, and it is now recognised by the American Ornithologists' Union and the British Ornithologists' Union as a distinct genus.

Seven subspecies are recognised:

- L. c. scoticus Pražák, 1897 – central north Scotland
- L. c. abadiei (Jouard, 1929) – west France
- L. c. weigoldi (Tratz, 1914) – west, south Iberian Peninsula
- L. c. cristatus (Linnaeus, 1758) – north, east Europe to the Carpathian Mts.
- L. c. baschkirikus Snigirewski, 1931 – southwest, central Ural Mountains
- L. c. mitratus (Brehm, CL, 1831) – central Europe to northeast Spain, the Alps and north Balkans
- L. c. bureschi (von Jordans, 1940) – Albania to Bulgaria and Greece

== Behaviour and ecology ==
It is an easy tit to recognise, for besides its erectile crest, the tip of which is often recurved, its gorget and collar are distinctive. It is, like other tits, talkative, and birds keep up a constant zee, zee, zee birdsong, similar to that of the coal tit.

It makes a nest in a hole in rotting stumps. This bird often feeds low down in trees, but although not shy, it is not always easily approached. It will join winter tit flocks with other species.

Like other tits, it is found in pairs and it feeds on insects (including caterpillars) and seeds.

== Gallery ==
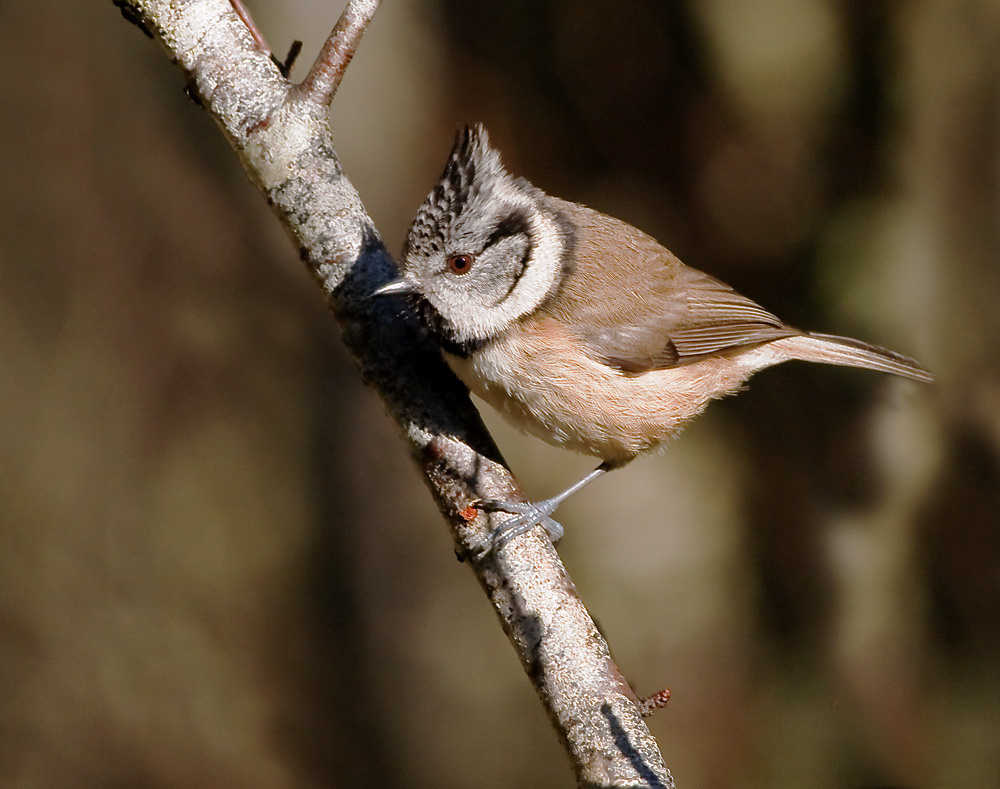
Crested tit, Aviemore, Scotland

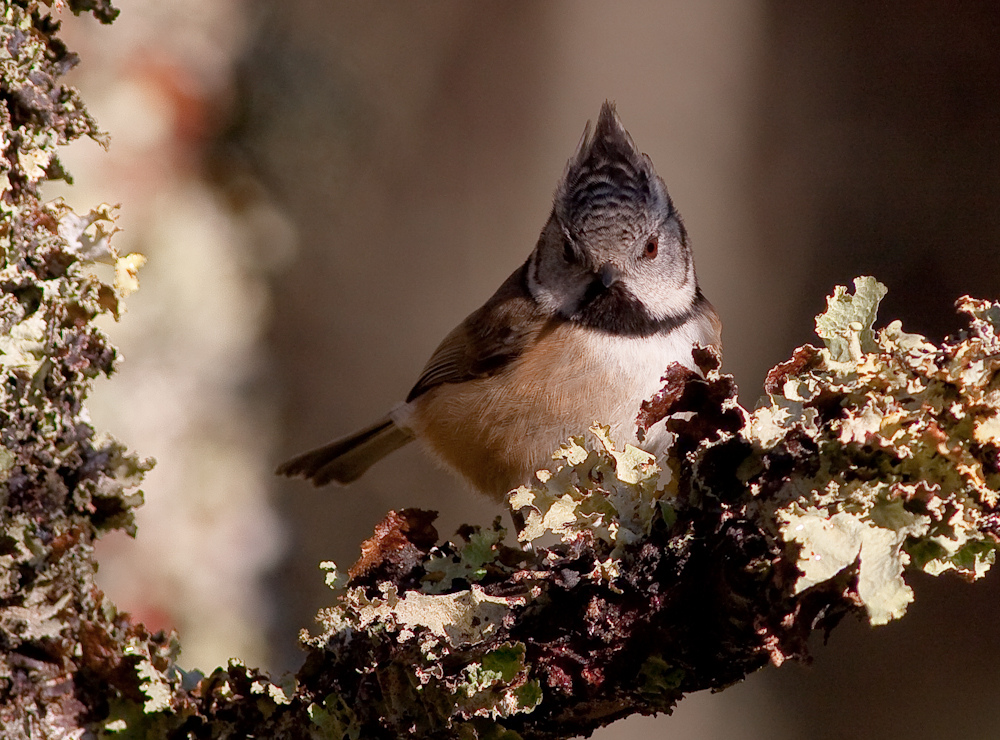
Crested tit, Aviemore, Scotland

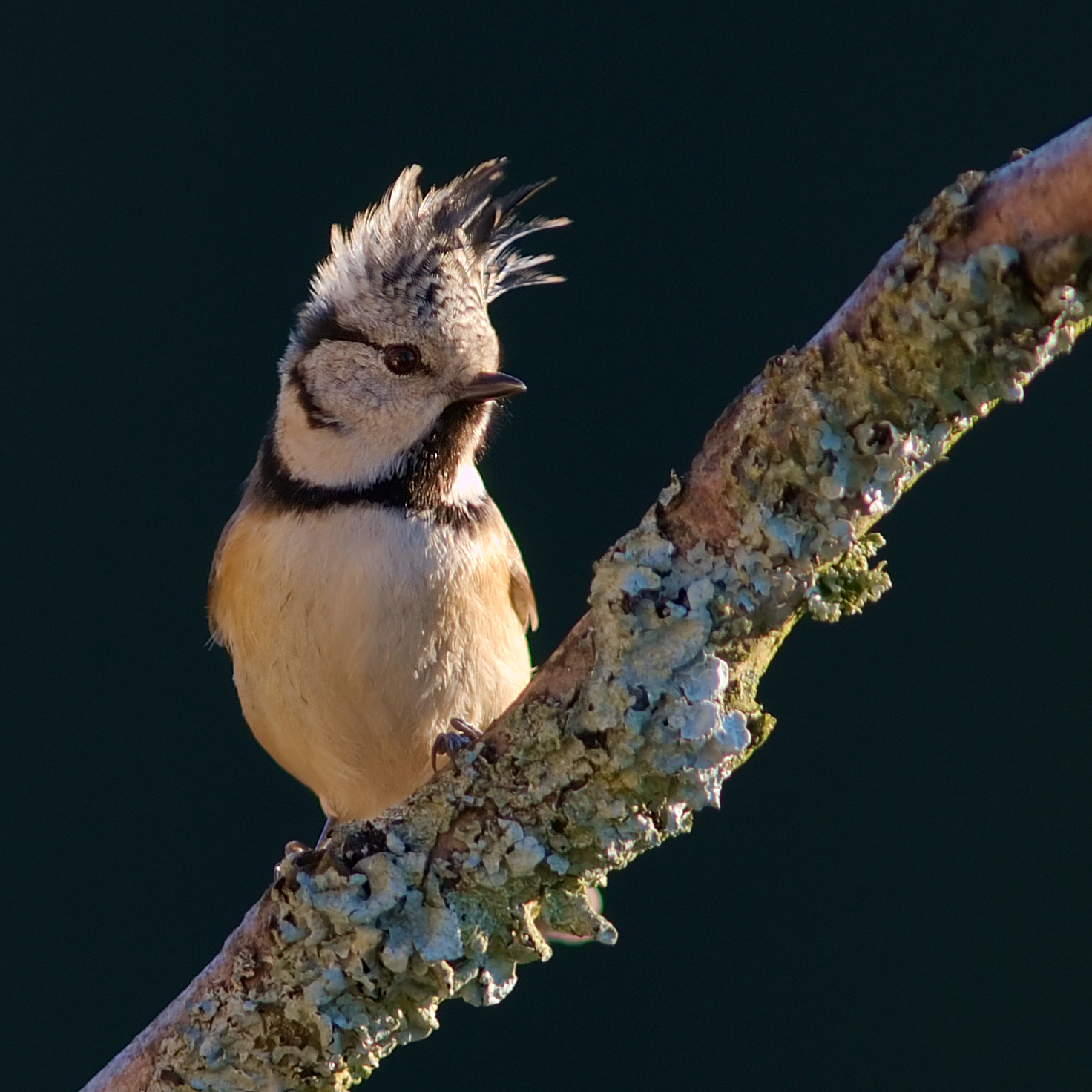

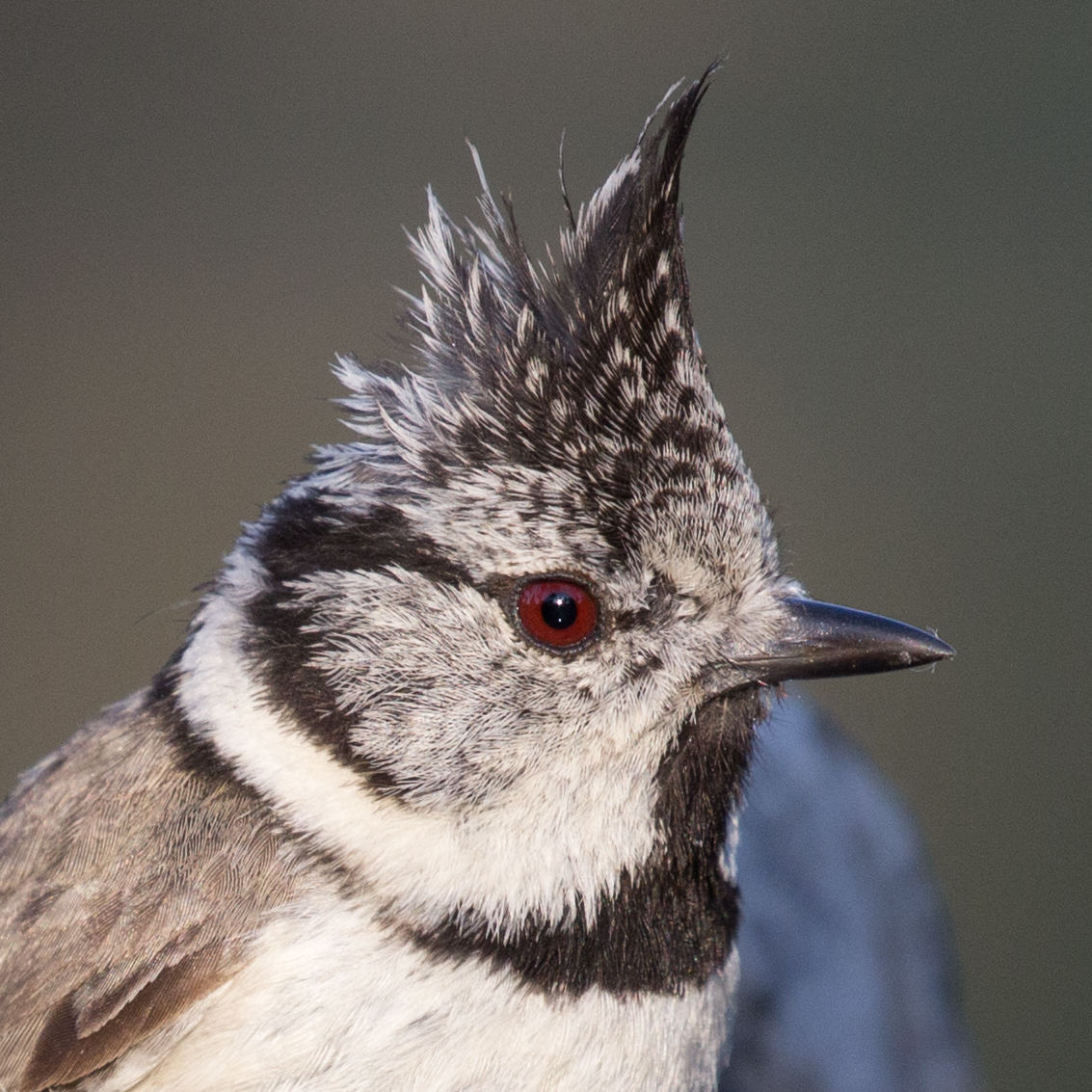
Crested tit, Cantalejo, Spain

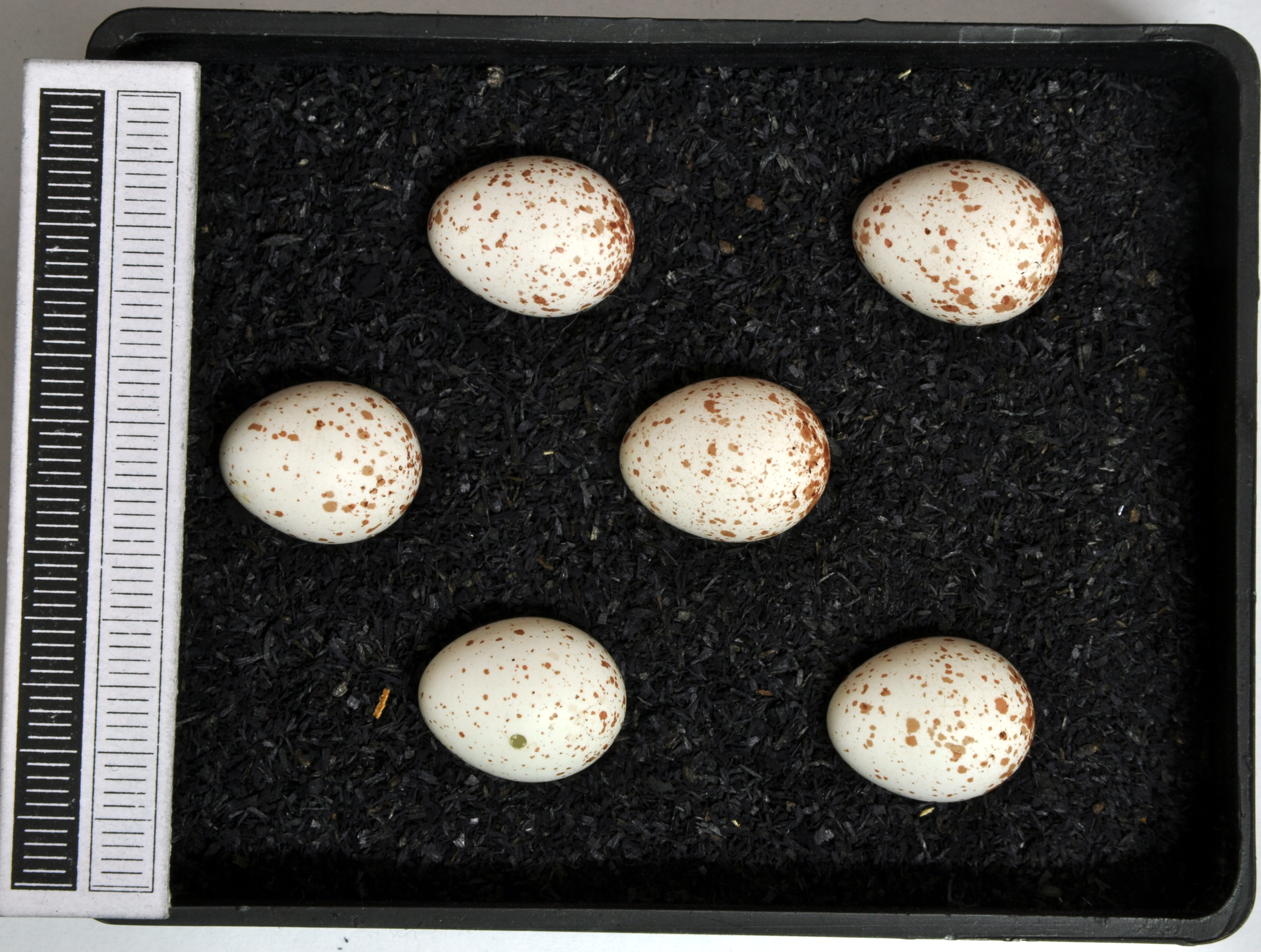
Eggs, Collection Museum Wiesbaden

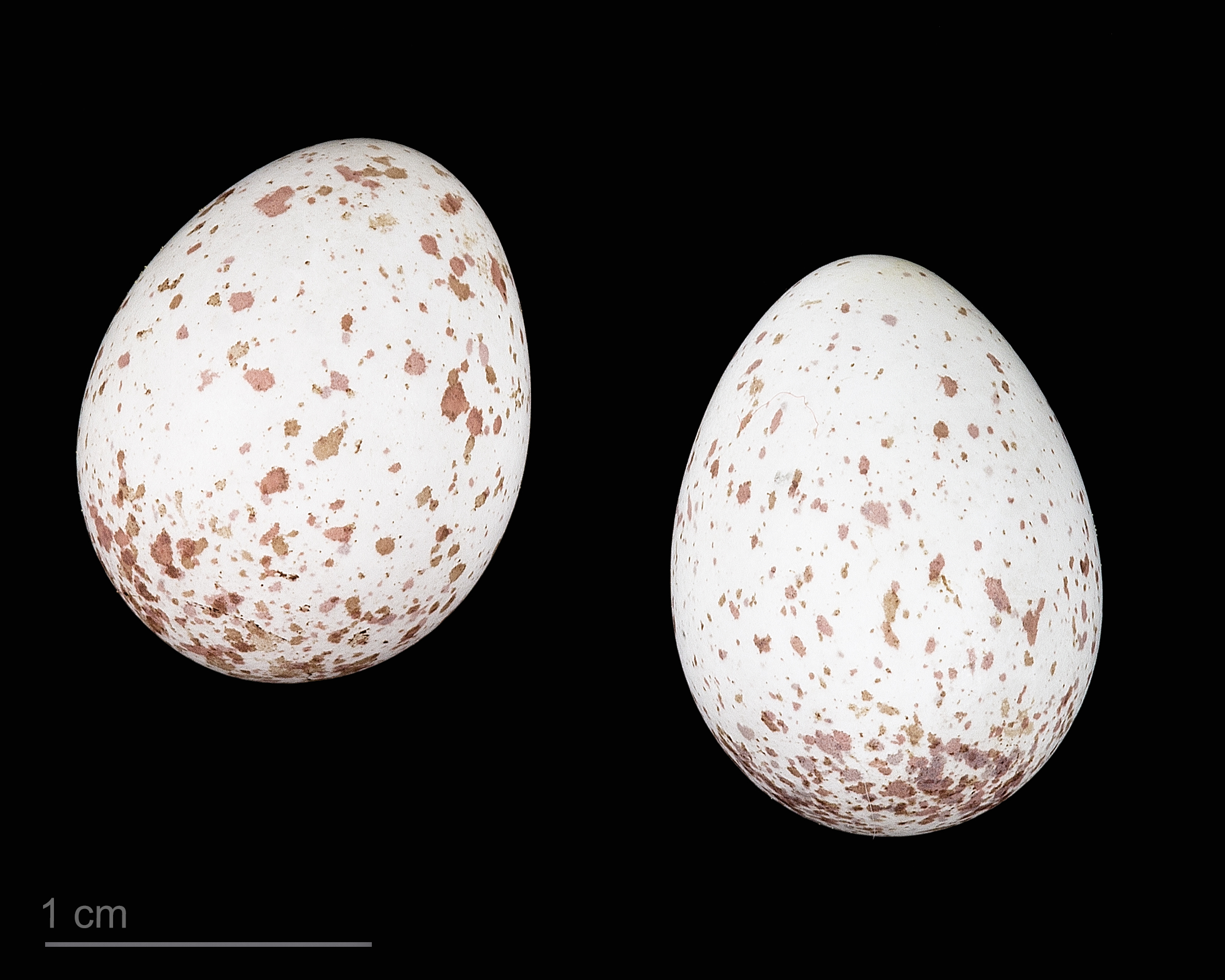
Lophophanes cristatus - MHNT
