= White-winged tit =

White-winged tit may refer to:

- White-naped tit (Machlolophus nuchalis) of Asia
- White-winged black tit (Melaniparus leucomelas) of Africa
