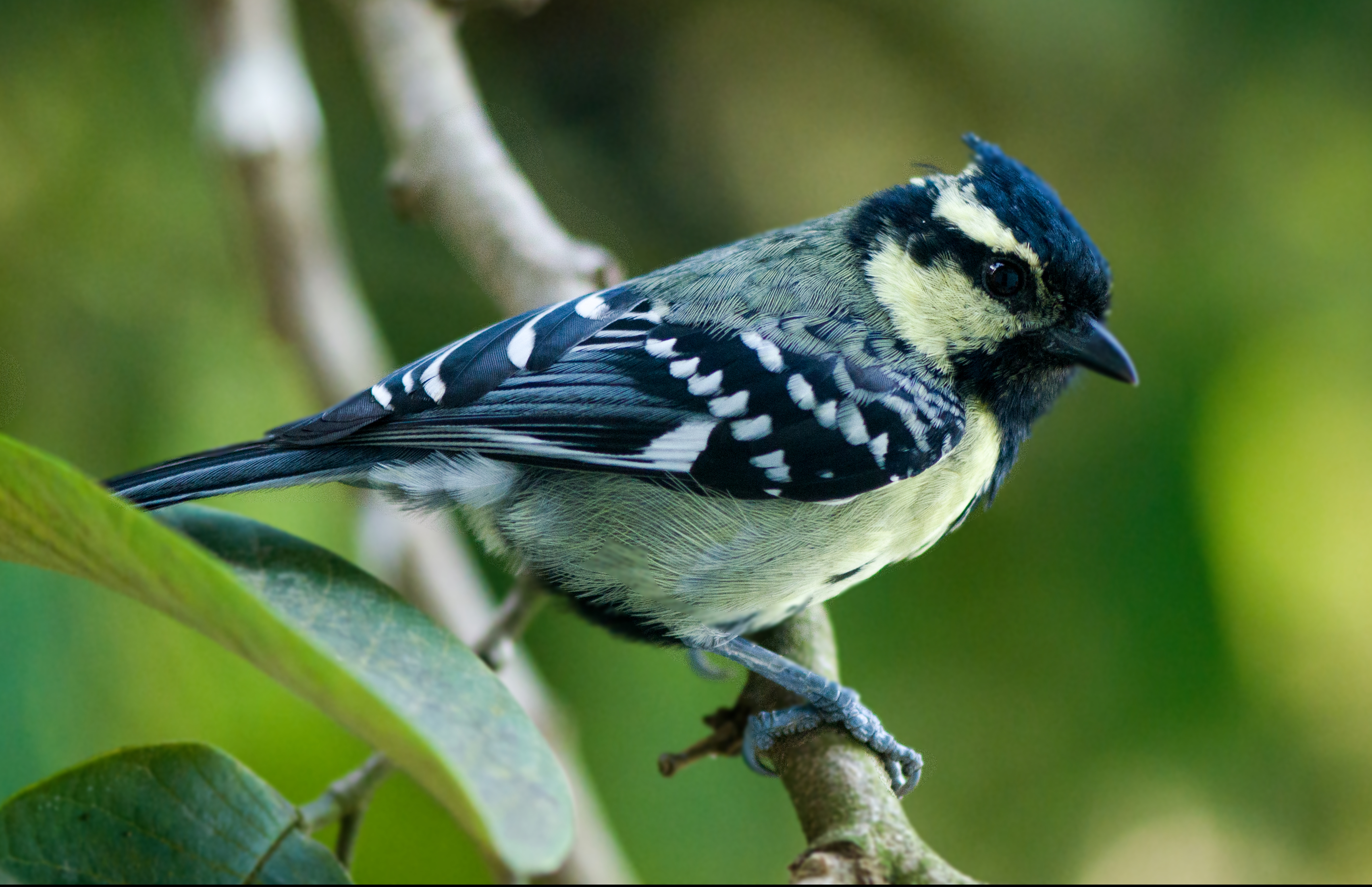
- An Indian black-lored tit from Idukki, Kerala in India.

Scientific classification
- Kingdom: Animalia
- Phylum: Chordata
- Class: Aves
- Order: Passeriformes
- Family: Paridae
- Genus: Machlolophus
- Species: M. aplonotus

Binomial name
- Machlolophus aplonotus (Blyth, 1847)

Synonyms
- Parus aplonotus

= Indian black-lored tit =

Species of bird

The Indian black-lored tit, Indian tit, or Indian yellow tit (Grimmett et al., 2011) (Machlolophus aplonotus) is a passerine bird in the tit family Paridae. The yellow-cheeked tit is probably its closest relative, and both may be related to the yellow tit. These three tits almost certainly form a distinct lineage as evidenced by morphology, and mtDNA cytochrome b sequence analysis (Gill et al., 2005). The subgenus name Macholophus may apply for them.

This species is a resident breeder on the Indian subcontinent. It is a common bird in open tropical forests, but does not occur in Sri Lanka. It is an active and agile feeder, taking insects and spiders from the canopy, and sometimes fruit.

It is an easy tit to recognise in most of India, large in size at 13 cm, with a broad black line (broader in the male) down its otherwise yellow front. The large crest, neck, throat and head are black with yellow cheeks and supercilia. Upperparts are olive-green. It has two white or yellowish wingbars and white outer tail feathers.

Females and young birds are duller than males. The underpart colour becomes increasingly dull from north to south through this tit's range.

It is, like other tits, a vocal bird, and has a large variety of calls, of which the most familiar is a si-si. The song is a sometimes nuthatch-like chi-chi-chi.

Woodpecker or barbet holes are used for a nest, and this species will also excavate its own hole or use man-made sites. The clutch is typically 3–5 white eggs, spotted red. The bird is a close sitter, hissing when disturbed.

The Indian black-lored tit was formerly one of the many species in the genus Parus but was moved to Machlolophus after a molecular phylogenetic analysis published in 2013 showed that the members of the new genus formed a distinct clade.
