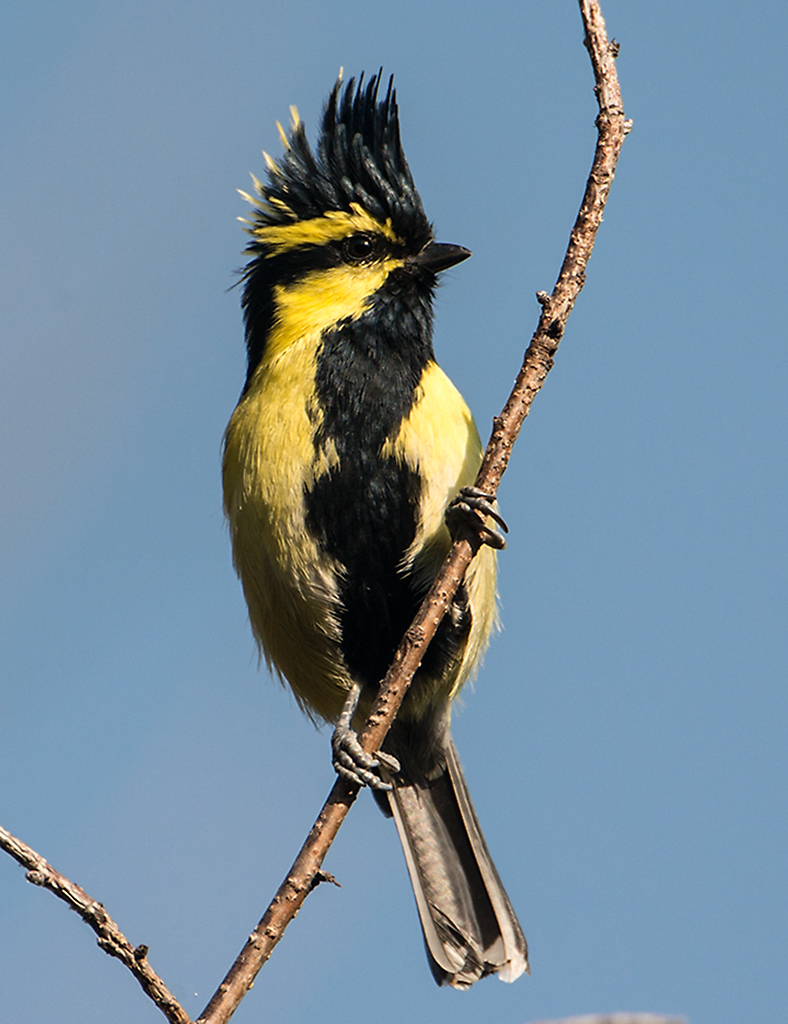

Conservation status
- Least Concern (IUCN 3.1)

Scientific classification
- Kingdom: Animalia
- Phylum: Chordata
- Class: Aves
- Order: Passeriformes
- Family: Paridae
- Genus: Machlolophus
- Species: M. xanthogenys

Binomial name
- Machlolophus xanthogenys (Vigors, 1831)

Synonyms
- Parus xanthogenys

= Himalayan black-lored tit =

Species of bird

The Himalayan black-lored tit (Machlolophus xanthogenys), also known as simply black-lored tit, is a passerine bird in the tit family Paridae. The yellow-cheeked tit is probably its closest relative, and it may also be related to the yellow tit. These three tits almost certainly form a distinct lineage, as indicated by morphology, and mtDNA cytochrome b sequence analysis (Gill et al., 2005).

Lore in the bird's common name refers to the area between eye and bill.

This species is a resident breeder along the Himalayas in the Indian subcontinent including Nepal. In Nepali, it is known as "Pandu Chichilkote".

It is an active and agile feeder, taking insects and spiders from the forest canopy, and sometimes fruit.

It uses woodpecker or barbet holes for nesting, and will also excavate its own hole or use man-made sites.

The Himalayan black-lored tit was formerly one of the many species in the genus Parus but was moved to Machlolophus after a molecular phylogenetic analysis published in 2013 showed that the members of the new genus formed a distinct clade.
