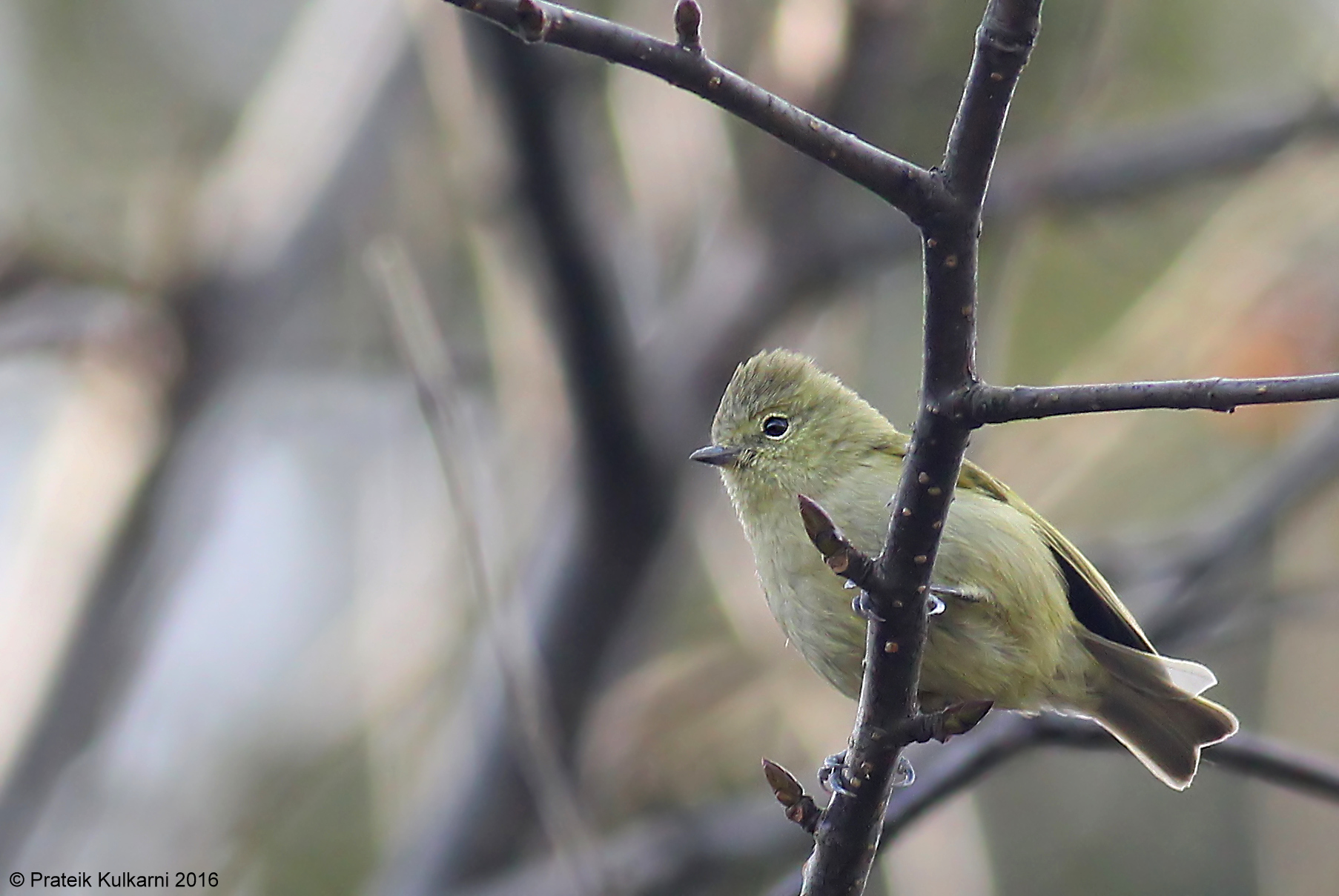

Conservation status
- Least Concern (IUCN 3.1)

Scientific classification
- Kingdom: Animalia
- Phylum: Chordata
- Class: Aves
- Order: Passeriformes
- Family: Paridae
- Genus: Sylviparus; Burton, 1836
- Species: S. modestus

Binomial name
- Sylviparus modestus Burton, 1836
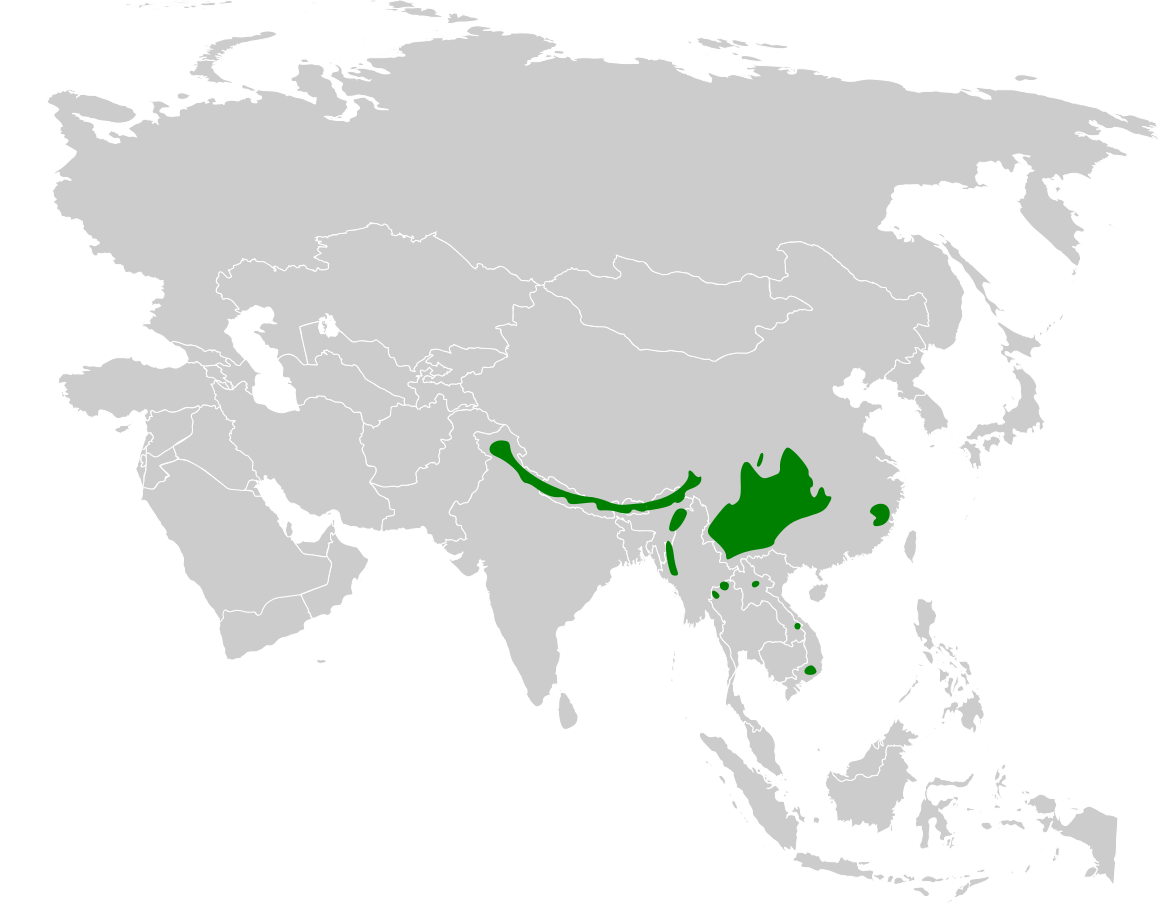

= Yellow-browed tit =

Species of bird

The yellow-browed tit (Sylviparus modestus) is a species of bird in the family Paridae. It is placed in the monotypic genus Sylviparus. It is a small song bird that measures 9–10 cm (3.5–3.9 in) long and weighs 5–9 g (0.18–0.32 oz). It is the smallest member of its family. It has a small bill, short tail, strong legs, and greenish feathers.

It is found in the southern Himalayas, Northeast India and southern China with smaller amounts in Southeast Asia. Its natural habitats are subtropical or tropical moist lowland forest and subtropical or tropical moist montane forest.

== Taxonomy ==
The yellow-browed tit was described by Edward Burton in 1836. It is the only member of the monotypic genus Sylviparus, which is fairly distinct from other tits, second-basal in the family Paridae after Cephalopyrus.

Three subspecies are recognised:

- S. m. simlaensis – (Baker, 1917): NW Himalayas from Kashmir E to NC India (Kumaon)
- S. m. modestus – (Burton, 1836): C and E Himalayas, NE India (hills of S Assam to Nagaland and Manipur), N, W and SE Myanmar, SC and SE China (SE Tibet, Yunnan, E Sichuan and Guizhou; also NW Fujian and SW Zhejiang), NW Thailand, N and SE Laos and N and SC Vietnam (W Tonkin, S Annam).
- S. m. klossi – (Delacour & Jabouille, 1930): SC Vietnam (Da Lat Plateau)

== Description ==
From the crown of the bird to the back, the bird is olive-green, it has a slightly greyer forehead. The wings and tail are greyish brown with green edges and have a faint yellow at the base of the tail. The face is olive-green with yellow flecks. It has a short, faint yellow line above the eye and a thin yellow ring around its eye. The throat and the underparts are dull olive-yellow, paler on its belly. When the feathers are worn, the bird looks duller, with a smaller eyebrow line and browner wings.

Males and females look the same. The juvenile birds are similar to adults, but their tail feathers are more pointed.

=== Sound ===
The yellow-browed tit has a short, high-pitched song, which can be transcribed as "tsit", "psit" or "pit", or as harsher "chip" or "tchup". When the sound is longer and more ringing it is transcribed as "tszizizizizi tszizizizizi"; a high-pitched "tee" or "tzee-tzee" can be heard, which is repeated when agitated.

== Behavior ==
=== Feeding ===
The diet is not well documented, but likely includes small invertebrates, larvae, and some seeds. It eats mainly in the middle and higher parts of trees and tall bushes. The bird moves quickly and restlessly and sometimes hangs from twigs and leaves. In autumn and winter it often joins mixed flocks with other tits such as the green-backed tit, black-throated tits, various babblers (Timaliidae), Eurasian treecreepers, Goldcrests and Blyth's leaf warblers.

=== Breeding ===
The breeding season for the yellow-browed tit is from at least April to May; it is normally seen alone, in pairs, or in small groups during its breeding season. Its clutch typically consists of four to six eggs. Both parents feed the chicks, and the adults may become defensive when protecting their young.

=== Distribution and habitat ===
This species lives in temperate mountain forests and lower mountain forests. Found in southern Asia mainly in the Himalayan mountains. It is mostly found in areas with oak, and mixed tree types. At higher elevations, it can be found in mossy forests with plants growing on trees and scrub near the tree line. It also lives in willow thickets and apricot orchards. In southern China, it is found in forests with spruce and fir. Outside of breeding season it lives in deciduous and evergreen forests with large gardens and hillside bushes, often at lower elevations: 1,200–2,400 metres or 3,900–7,900 feet (Western Kashmir); 1,500–2,800 metres or 4,900–9,200 feet (sometimes up to 4,265 metres (14,000 ft)) (Nepal); Down to 900 metres or 3,000 feet (Eastern Himalayas among other areas).
