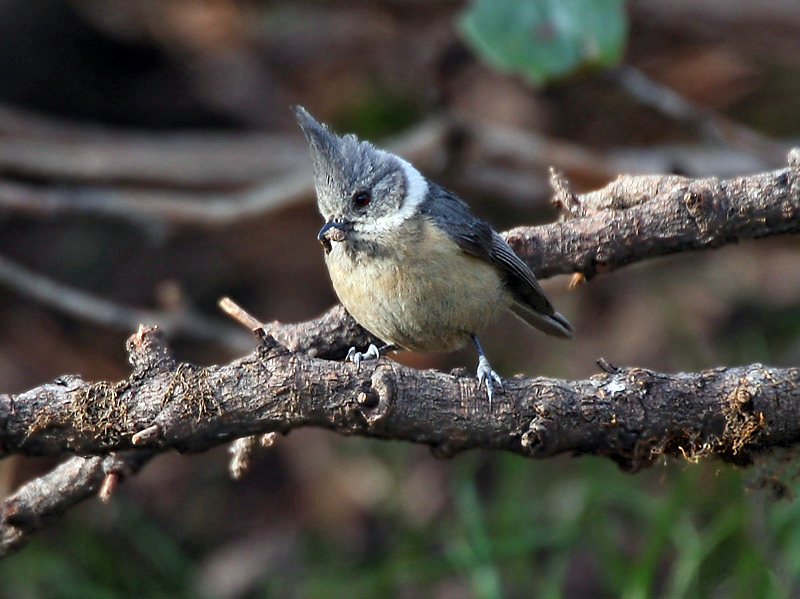
- Carrying food for juveniles at Biskeri (11,000 ft.) in Kullu - Manali District of Himachal Pradesh, India.

Conservation status
- Least Concern (IUCN 3.1)

Scientific classification
- Kingdom: Animalia
- Phylum: Chordata
- Class: Aves
- Order: Passeriformes
- Family: Paridae
- Genus: Lophophanes
- Species: L. dichrous

Binomial name
- Lophophanes dichrous (Blyth, 1845)
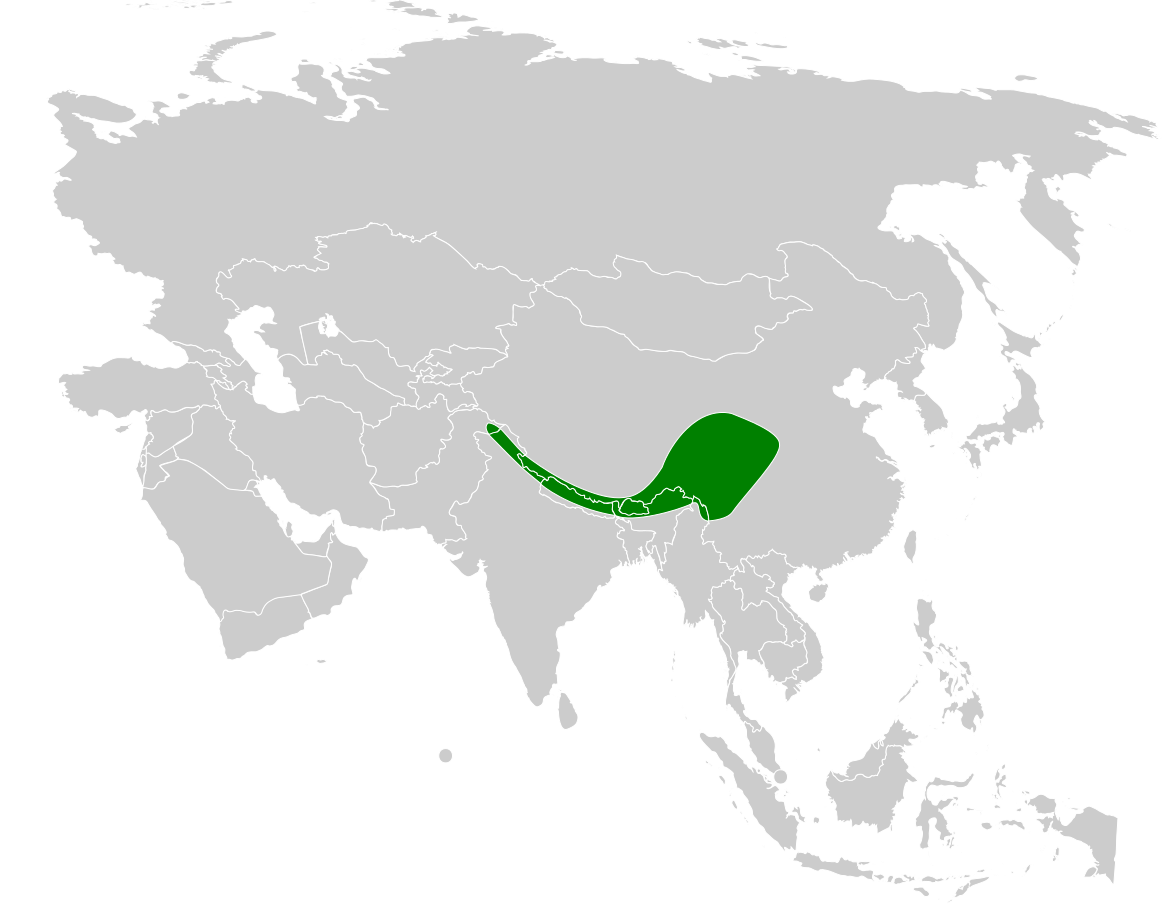
- Range of Lophophanes dichrous

Synonyms
- Parus dichrous Blyth, 1844

= Grey-crested tit =

Species of bird

The grey-crested tit (Lophophanes dichrous) is a species of bird in the family Paridae.

It is found in the Himalayan foothills and southern-central China. Its natural habitats are temperate forest and subtropical or tropical moist montane forest.
