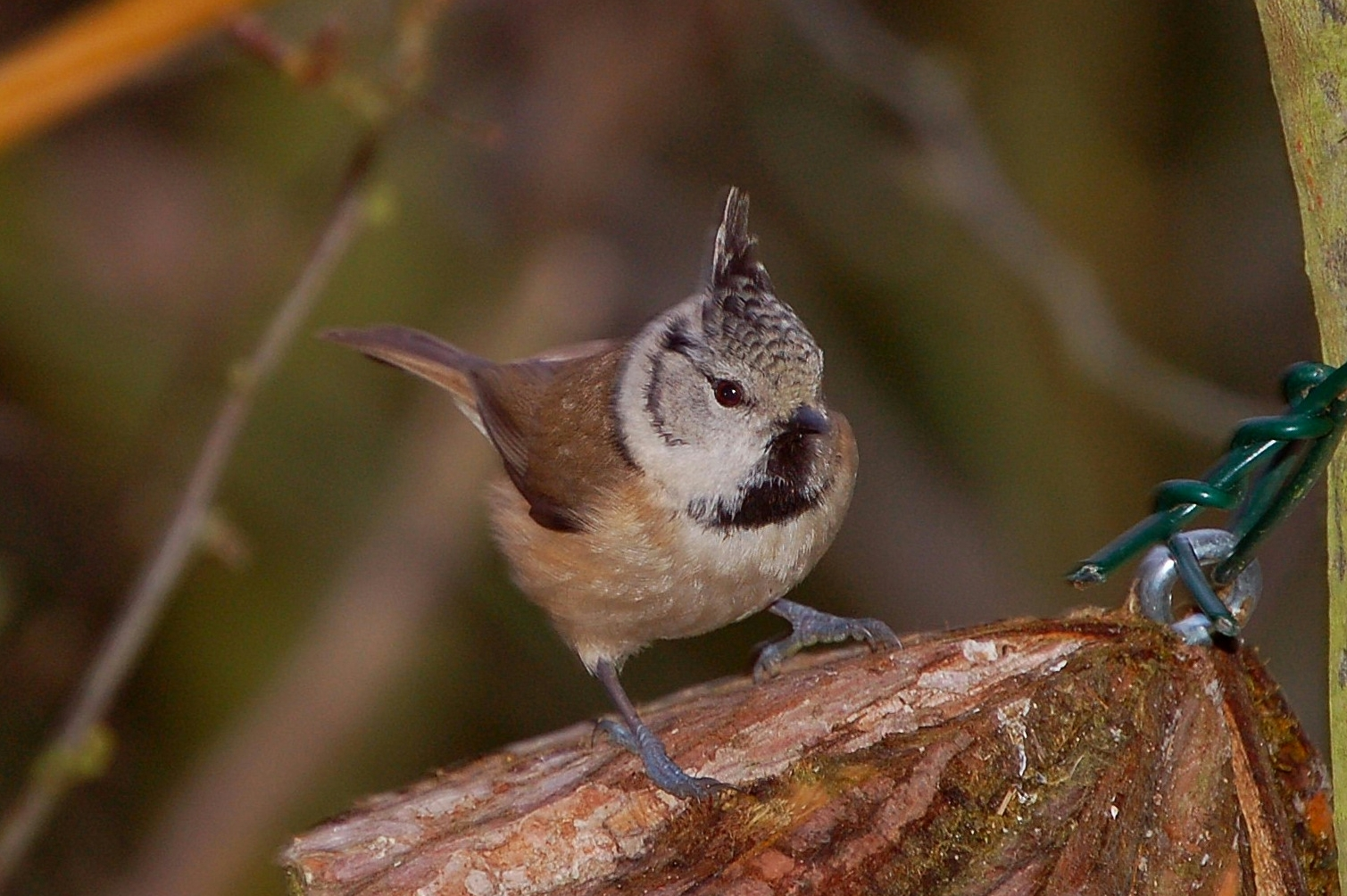
- Crested tit

Scientific classification
- Kingdom: Animalia
- Phylum: Chordata
- Class: Aves
- Order: Passeriformes
- Family: Paridae
- Genus: Lophophanes; Kaup, 1829

Type species
- Parus cristatus Linnaeus, 1758

Species
- L. cristatus; L. dichrous
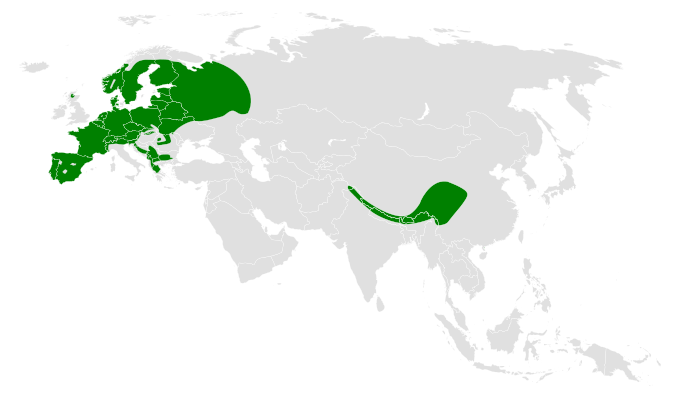

= Lophophanes =

Genus of birds

Lophophanes is a small genus of birds in the tit family Paridae.

== Taxonomy ==
The genus Lophophanes was introduced in 1829 by the German naturalist Johann Jakob Kaup with Parus cristatus, Linnaeus, 1758, as the type species. The genus name is from the Ancient Greek lophos, "crest", and phaino, "to show". The genus was formerly synonymised with the genus Parus but based on the results of a molecular phylogenetic study published in 2005, the genus was resurrected to contain two species: the crested tit and the grey-crested tit.

The genus contains the following two species:

Image	Scientific name	Common name	Distribution
	Lophophanes cristatus	Crested tit	central and northern Europe
	Lophophanes dichrous	Grey-crested tit	southern-central China
