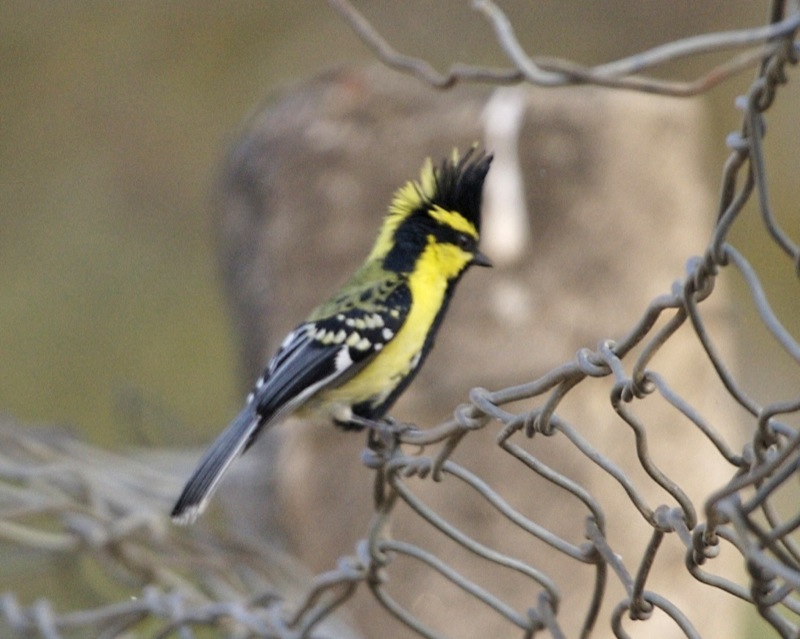
- Machlolophus xanthogenys (Himalayan black-lored tit)

Scientific classification
- Kingdom: Animalia
- Phylum: Chordata
- Class: Aves
- Order: Passeriformes
- Family: Paridae
- Genus: Machlolophus; Cabanis, 1851

Type species
- Parus spilonotus

Species
- See text

Synonyms
- Macholophus

= Machlolophus =

Genus of birds

Machlolophus is a genus of birds in the tit family. The species were formerly placed with many others in the genus Parus but were moved to Machlolophus based on a molecular phylogenetic analysis published in 2013 that showed that the members formed a distinct clade.

The name Machlolophus was introduced by the German ornithologist Jean Cabanis in 1850. The word is derived from the classical Greek makhlos meaning luxuriant, and lophos meaning crest.

The following species, all from Asia, have been placed in the genus:

Image	Scientific name	Common name	Distribution
	Machlolophus nuchalis	White-naped tit	southern India
	Machlolophus holsti	Yellow tit	central Taiwan
	Machlolophus xanthogenys	Himalayan black-lored tit	Himalayas in the Indian Subcontinent.
	Machlolophus aplonotus	Indian black-lored tit	Indian subcontinent
	Machlolophus spilonotus	Yellow-cheeked tit	Bangladesh, Bhutan, China, Hong Kong, India, Laos, Burma, Nepal, Thailand, and Vietnam.
