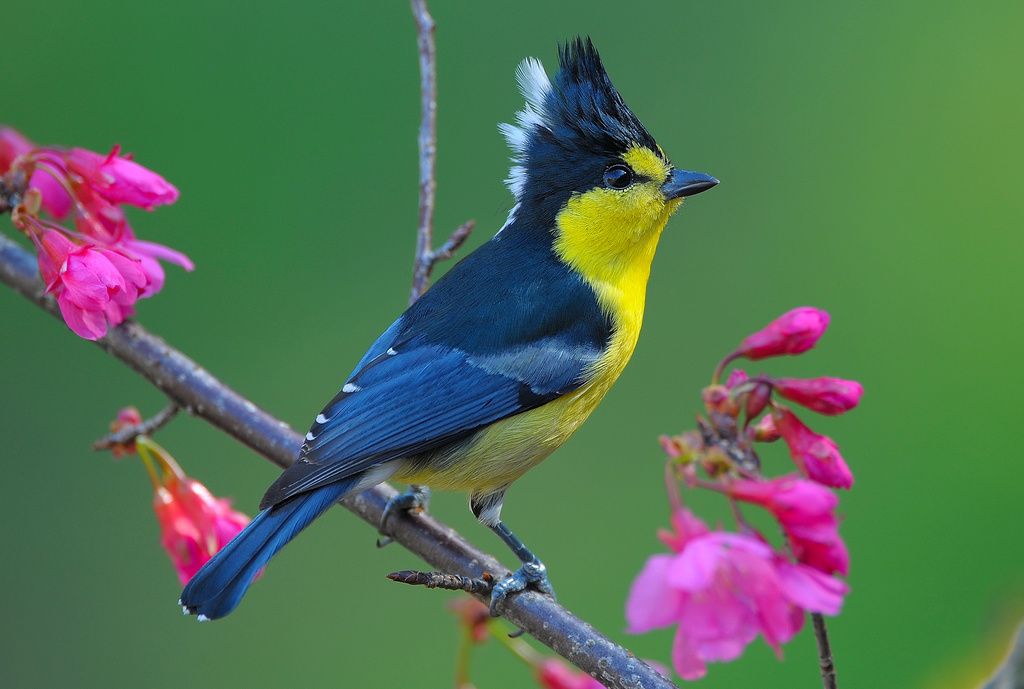

Conservation status
- Least Concern (IUCN 3.1)

Scientific classification
- Kingdom: Animalia
- Phylum: Chordata
- Class: Aves
- Order: Passeriformes
- Family: Paridae
- Genus: Machlolophus
- Species: M. holsti

Binomial name
- Machlolophus holsti (Seebohm, 1894)
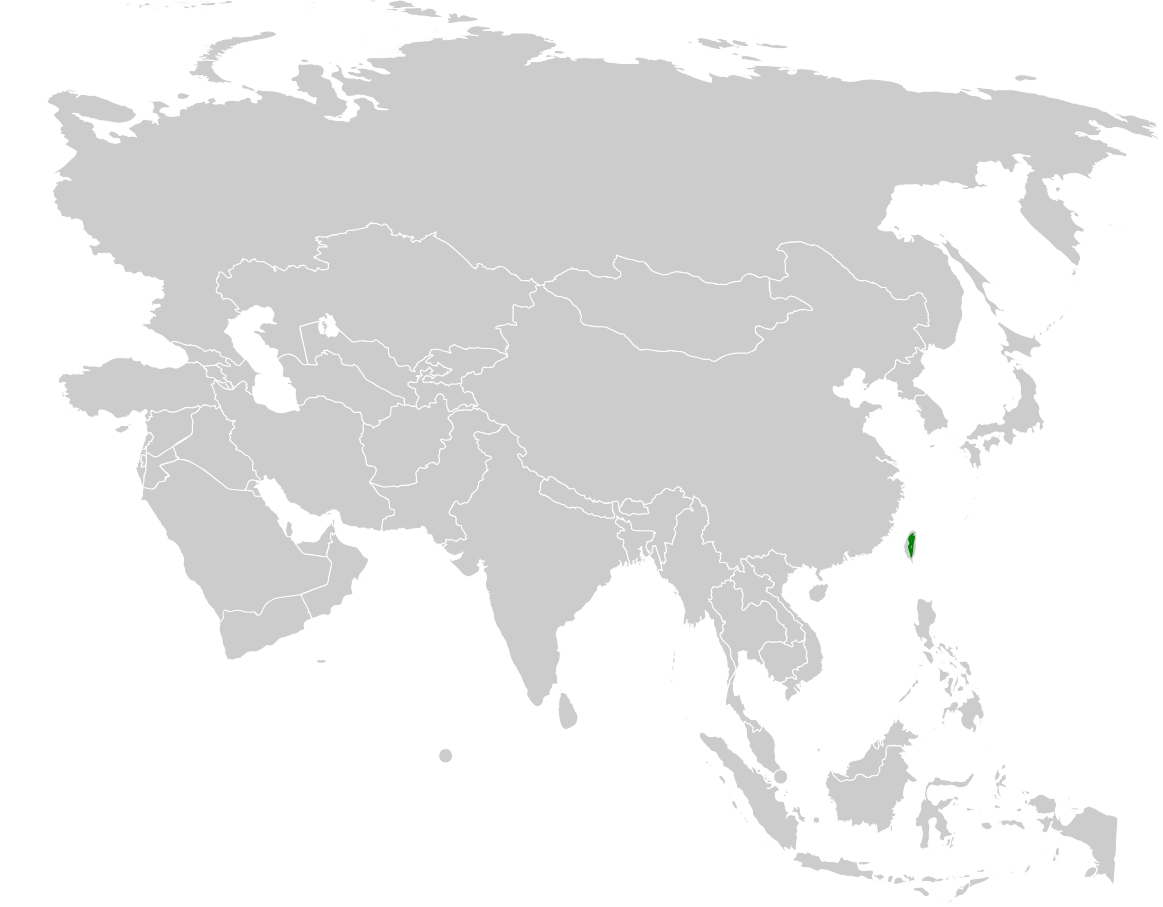

Synonyms
- Parus holsti

= Yellow tit =

Species of bird

The yellow tit (Machlolophus holsti), also known as Taiwan yellow tit and Formosan yellow tit, is a species of bird in the family Paridae. It is endemic to central Taiwan.

Its natural habitat is montane temperate forest.

It has a small range, and while the population size is unknown but not believed to be particularly small, and its population is believed to be stable. For these reasons, it is considered Least Concern by the IUCN. Historically, the yellow tit was captured for the pet trade, but there is no evidence this has impacted its wild population.

The yellow tit was formerly one of the many species in the genus Parus but was moved to Machlolophus after a molecular phylogenetic analysis published in 2013 showed that the members of the new genus formed a distinct clade.

Its length is 13 cm. The yellow tit is mostly yellow, with a crest. The crest and back are blackish blue-grey.
