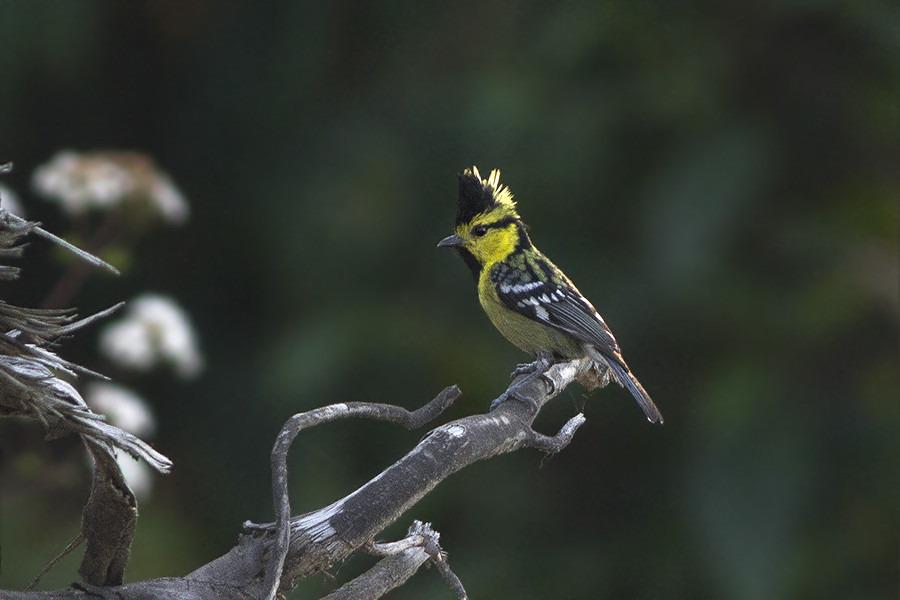
- An individual from Neora Valley National Park, West Bengal, India

Conservation status
- Least Concern (IUCN 3.1)

Scientific classification
- Kingdom: Animalia
- Phylum: Chordata
- Class: Aves
- Order: Passeriformes
- Family: Paridae
- Genus: Machlolophus
- Species: M. spilonotus

Binomial name
- Machlolophus spilonotus (Bonaparte, 1850)

Synonyms
- Parus spilonotus

= Yellow-cheeked tit =

Species of bird

The yellow-cheeked tit (Machlolophus spilonotus) is a species of bird in the family Paridae. Its natural habitats are subtropical or tropical moist lowland forest and subtropical or tropical moist montane forest. Its range extends across the eastern Himalayas, southern China and Indochina.

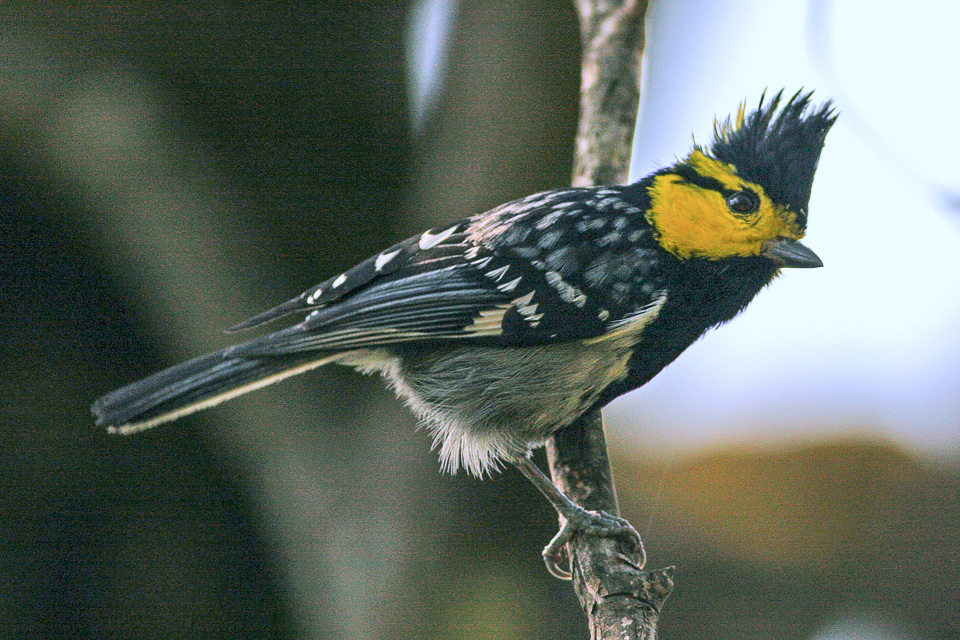
M. s. rex, Wuyi National Park, China

The yellow-cheeked tit was formerly one of the many species in the genus Parus but was moved to Machlolophus after a molecular phylogenetic analysis published in 2013 showed that the members of the new genus formed a distinct clade.
