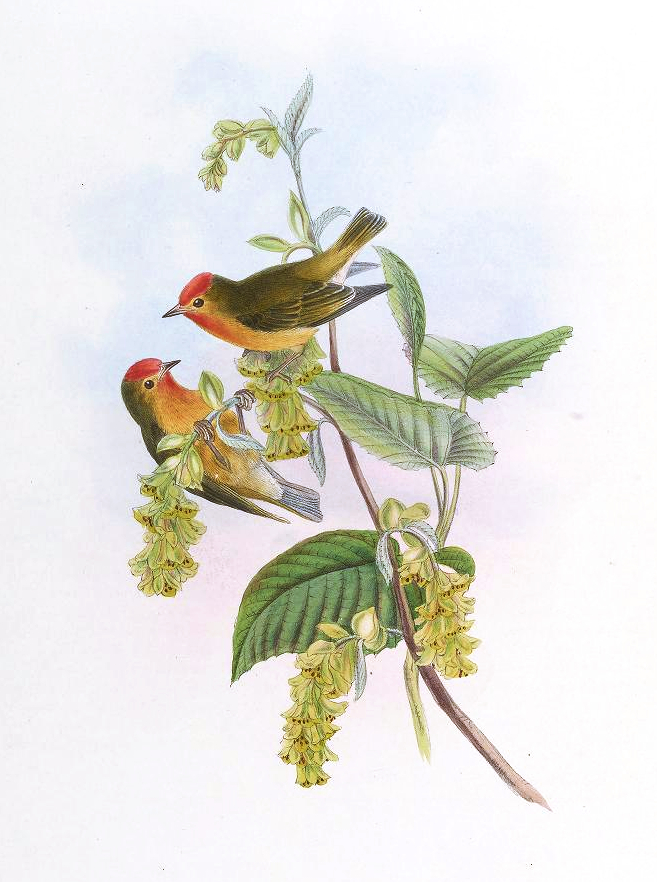
- Illustration of Cephalopyrus flammiceps, take from "The Birds of Asia", by John Gould

Conservation status
- Least Concern (IUCN 3.1)

Scientific classification
- Kingdom: Animalia
- Phylum: Chordata
- Class: Aves
- Order: Passeriformes
- Family: Paridae
- Genus: Cephalopyrus; Bonaparte, 1854
- Species: C. flammiceps

Binomial name
- Cephalopyrus flammiceps (Burton, 1836)
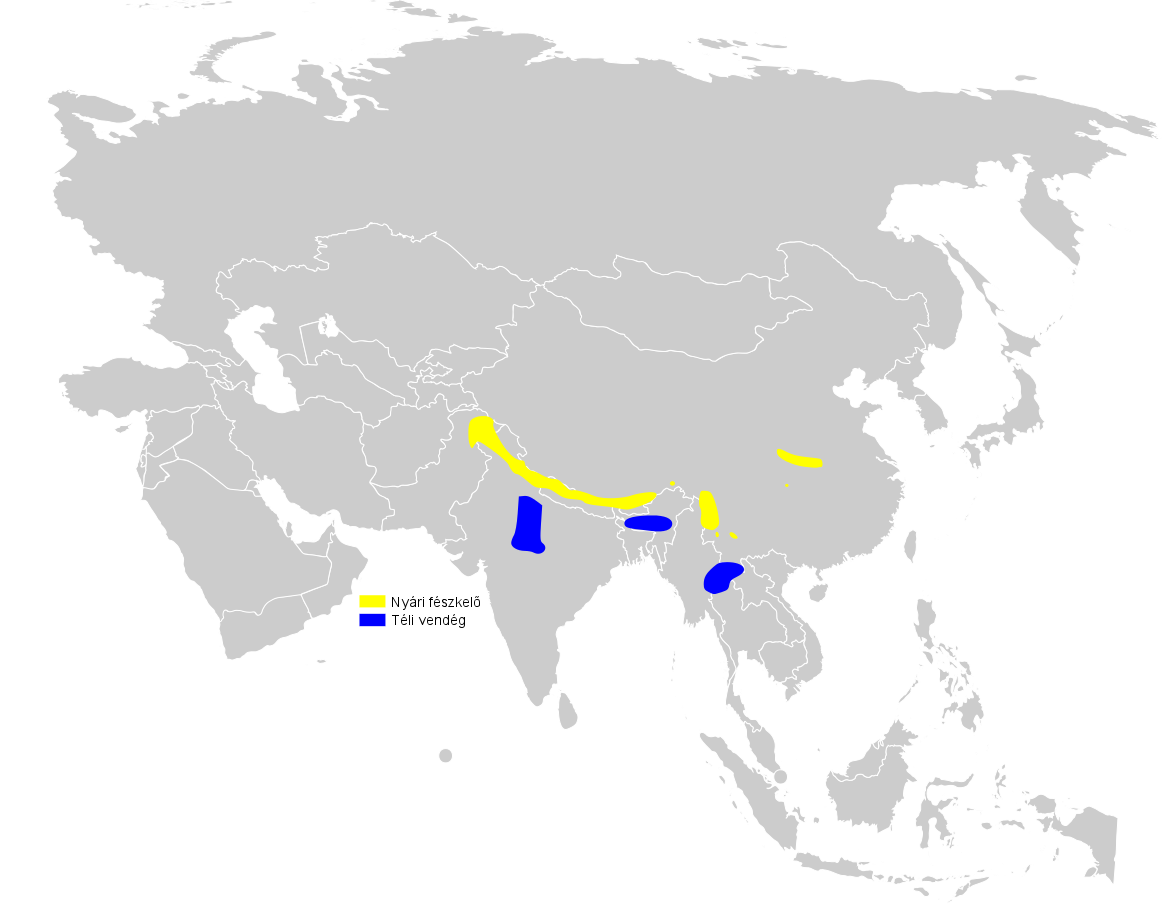

= Fire-capped tit =

Species of bird

The fire-capped tit (Cephalopyrus flammiceps) is a small, 10 cm (3.9 in) long, weighing about 7 g (0.25 oz) bird species assigned to the family Paridae, that breeds in the temperate forest bordering the Himalayas to the south, in the Hengduan Shan and Nujiang Shan on the Myanmar-China border, the Micah Shan and Daba Shan on the Northern Sichuan border. It winters down hill and further south. Further to the east, birds tend to be smaller and the plumage becomes gradually darker.

== Taxonomy ==
The species was once considered to be a kinglet but is today treated as a tit. It is placed in a monotypic genus, Cephalopyrus. Its previous assignment to the family Remizidae was not entirely satisfactory, as this species nests in hollows in trees, as do the true tits and chickadees (Paridae), so it was placed there. It also lays blue eggs, like the verdin Auriparus flaviceps, and not white. Its small cone-shaped bill, and its song however are typical for a penduline tit.

== Description ==
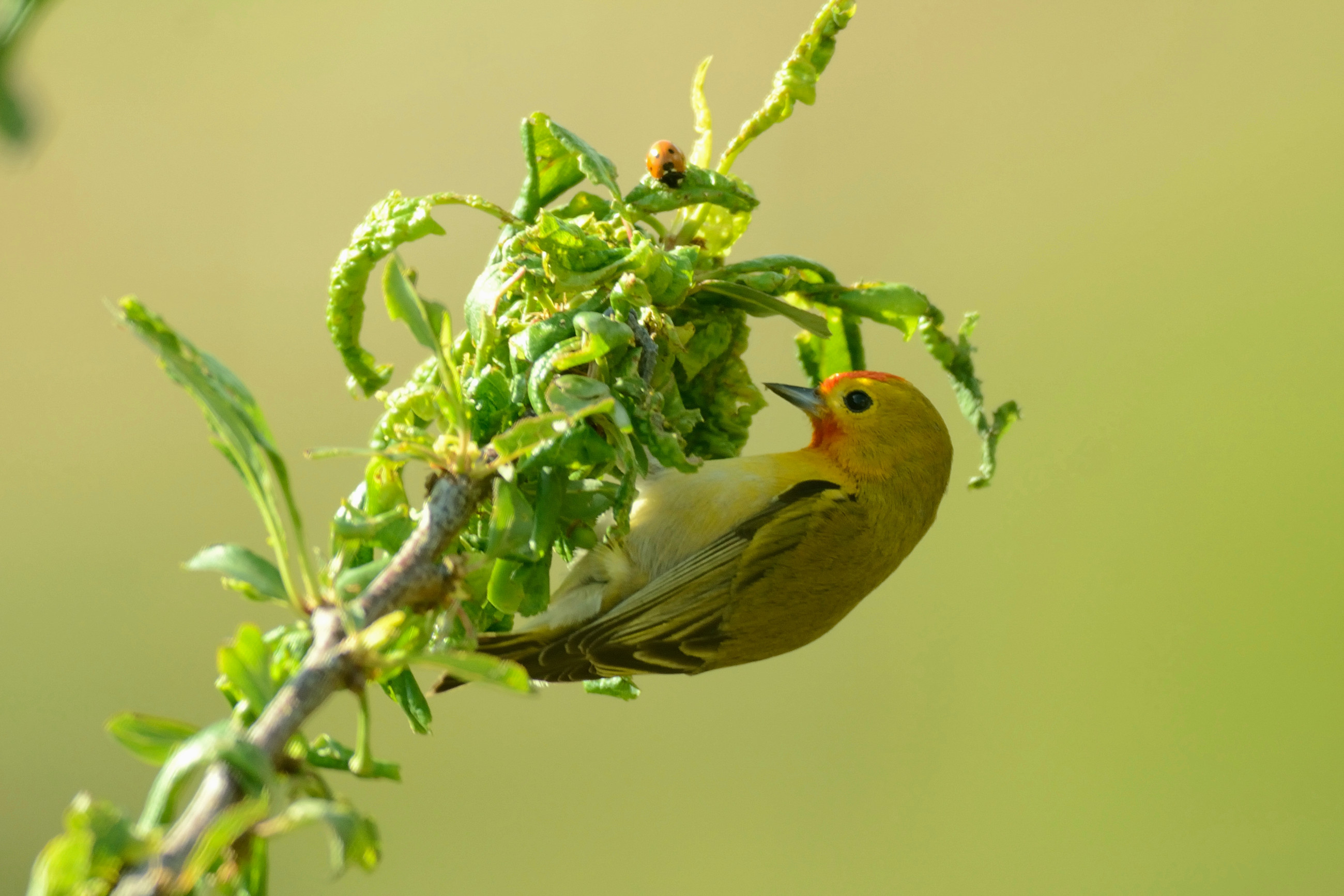
Male

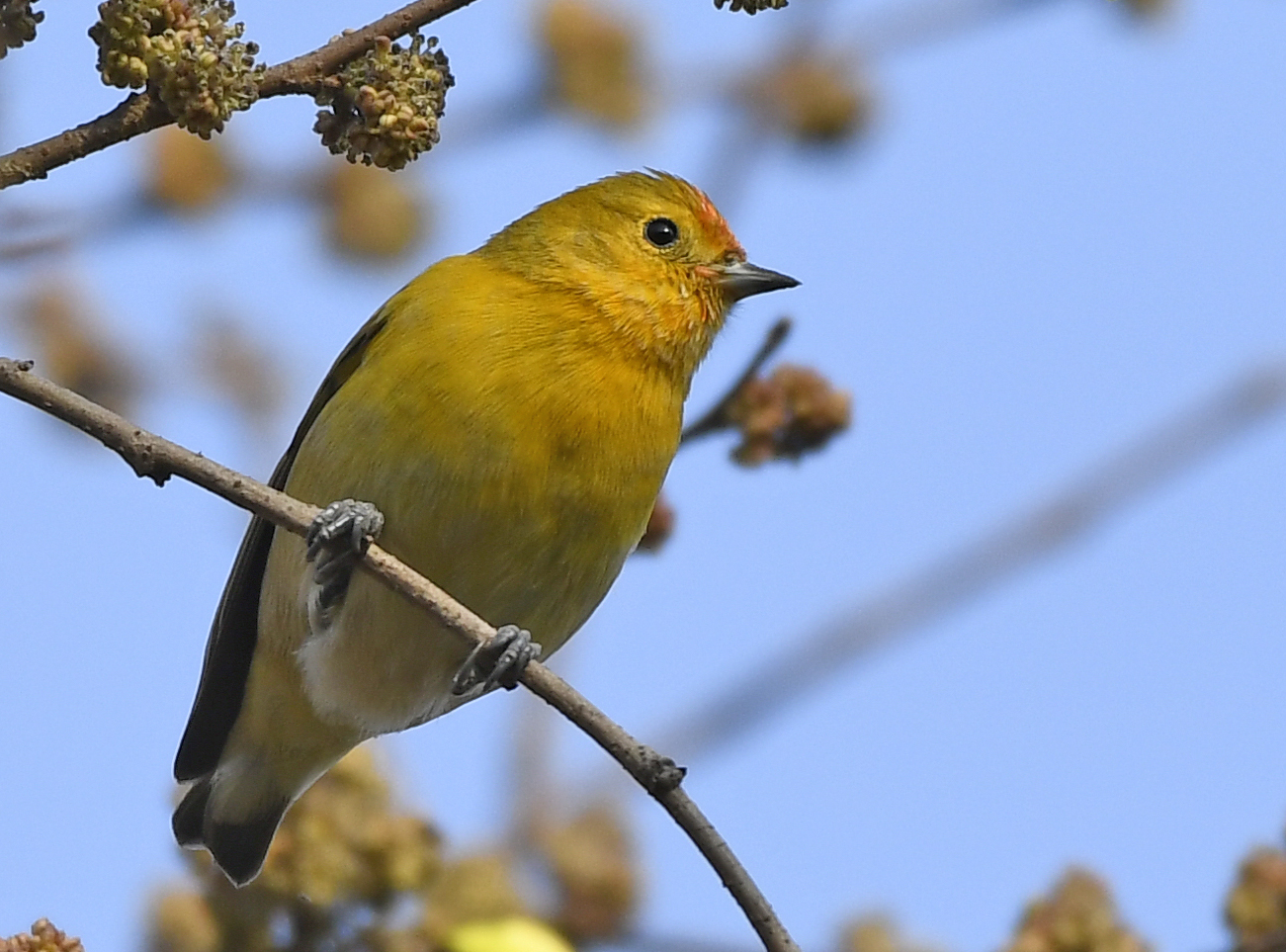
Fire-capped Tit: Male, at Delhi, India

=== Male ===
Outside the breeding season (September–January), the crown is dark olive-brown, with a yellowish olive-green border. The upper parts are yellowish to olive-green. The rump yellowish to olive-golden yellow. The longest tail feathers are dark gray. The tail is dark olive-brown, all the feathers being tipped with white. The wings are the same color as the tail, but with olive-yellow edging larger or smaller on all blankets and feathers. The throat is white. Chest, belly and flanks show a yellow lemon, contrasting with the gray of the thighs, anal area and the underside of the tail.

In breeding plumage (February–July), the male has a slight orange-scarlet colored crest. The eyebrow and around the eye is golden yellow tinged with red. The cheeks, ear coverts and sides of the neck are olive-yellow. The chin and upper throat are orange chrome, melting into golden yellow chest. The sides of the chest and the upper sides are yellow-olive. The rear flanks and belly are pale yellow. The tips of the tail and wing feathers are white but worn.

Year round, the iris is brown to dark brown, the bill dark blue-gray with a darker tip. Legs and feet are dark blue-gray. The underwing coverts are white with a yellow fringe tip.

=== Female ===
Outside the breeding season, the female is not very different from her partner, although the upper parts (including the cheeks, brow and sides of the neck) are olive-green gray. The chin and throat are whitish gray, blending into the dull gray of the rest of the underparts. The chest is yellow-tinged olive, the upper sides and belly are pale yellow tinged. The axillary and the underside of the wings are gray.

In breeding plumage, the forehead is yellow-olive drab. The top of the lower parts (chin and throat chest) olive-yellow contrasts sharply with the belly and anal area whitish yellow.

=== Egg ===
Eggs have a dull blue-green color.

=== Sounds ===
Calls include a high-pitched but ample and jerky "tsit-tsit-tsit-tsit" at irregular intervals.

Contact call is a soft and low "whitoo-whitoo".

When singing, the male flies or sits on a high well-exposed spot like the top of a tree. The song lasts several minutes. It consists of a series of rapid, high notes, forming well-constructed sentences: "pit'su-pit'su-pit'su-pit'su".

== Behaviour ==
The fire-capped tit is not shy. It is always active, giving little wing strokes like a warbler. It is reminiscent of the small tit Sylviparus modestus. During migration and in winter, it is usually found in small flocks, but groups of up to 100 may be seen. Most of the time, these groups, flying high above the bare hills, are monotypic, but they sometimes join mixed flocks when foraging.

The flight is powerful like that of finches. It seeks its food higher up in large trees, but also sometimes in the bushes close to the ground. It is rather agile, adopting acrobatic positions, upside down, or sliding along vertical branches like parrots. This tit is able to open rolled-up leaves with its beak as starlings do, and hold it with its foot.

=== Feeding ===
The fire-capped tit feeds largely on insects but also leaves, flowers, buds and probably pollen and sap. Captured prey is held with the feet and processed with the bill. Large insects are opened and emptied of their contents, the empty carapace being discarded. This practice is quite similar to that of other tits, but unlike them, the fire-capped tit does not cut its prey into small pieces.

=== Nesting ===
The nesting season runs from early April to mid-June. The nest is built in a hollow inside a trunk or large branch. The fire-capped tit prefers cavities with their entrance protected by a branch or scar. It usually uses natural cavities but often takes over an abandoned woodpecker nest. Occasionally, a hollow is excavated where a rotting branch fell off. The nest, usually between 6 and 12 meters above the ground, is often very difficult to detect. The nest itself is a bowl built of dry grass, rootlets and sometimes a few feathers. It is lined with finer grasses and feathers. This is done by the female, while the male protects the territory. There are usually four dull blue-green eggs. The incubation period is unknown. If she is disturbed, she tries to deter the intruders by inflating her feathers and making hissing sounds. It is unknown if the male takes part in incubating. Youngsters are fed by both parents. The female takes care of maintenance and cleaning of the nest on her own.

== Habitat ==
The fire-capped tit occurs in forest, woodlands and regions with solitary trees. It prefers temperate rainforest and mixed deciduous forest with oak, hazel, elm and walnut, just below the conifer belt. At higher altitudes it frequents clusters of cherry and scattered willows. In Kashmir and Ladakh it nests in shrubs at high altitude. In China it is reported in spruce, fir and rhododendron. In Thailand, it stays in deciduous hillside forests. Nesting occurs at different altitudes depending on the region. In Pakistan, the fire-capped tit nests between 1,800 m (5,900 ft) and 2,600 m (8,500 ft), in the northwest of India from 1800 m to 3,500 m (11,500 ft), and in Nepal from 2,135 m (7,005 ft) to 3,000 m (9,800 ft). Western populations winter in the plains of North-Central India. Populations of the eastern Himalayas spend the period from November to May in southern Sikkim, between 300 m (980 ft) and 1,400 m (4,600 ft). In the far east of the breeding range, seasonal migration is less pronounced, and in Sichuan and Burma the birds remain during the winter at relatively high altitudes, around 1800 meters. During the winter it is also found in evergreen broad-leaved forest in Thailand.

== Subspecies and distribution ==
- C. f. flammiceps (E. Burton, 1836) - breeds from Northern Pakistan (Gilgit) and Kashmir in the west, to Western Nepal at the east end of its range. It occurs in North-Central India but does not breed there.
- C. f. olivaceus Rothschild, 1923 - breeds from Eastern Nepal in the west to Bhutan, North-Eastern India (Assam, Arunachal Pradesh, Sikkem), and southern China (South Ningxia, South-East Gansu, South Shaanxi, South and Central Sichuan, South-East Xizang, Yunnan and West Guizhou) in the east. It occurs in foothills, and also (rarely) in East Myanmar, North-West Thailand and North-West Laos, but does not breed there.
