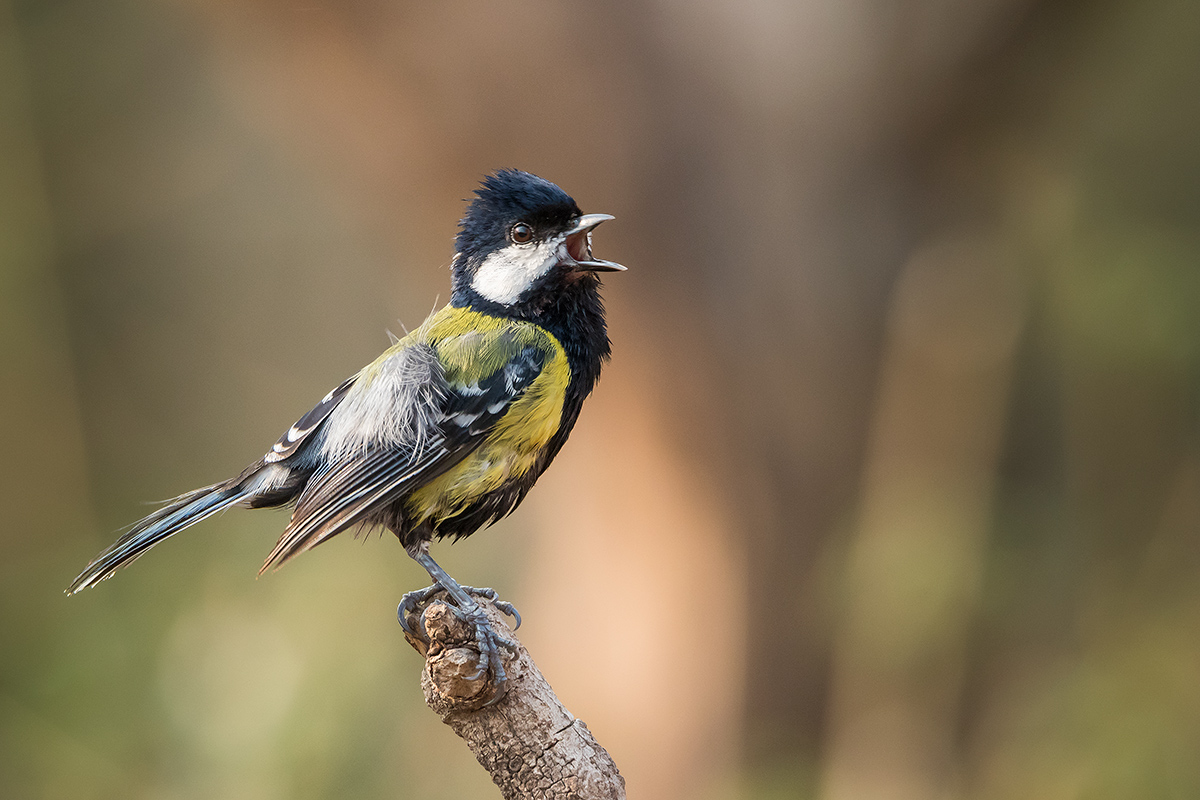
- At Sattal. Uttarakhand, India

Conservation status
- Least Concern (IUCN 3.1)

Scientific classification
- Kingdom: Animalia
- Phylum: Chordata
- Class: Aves
- Order: Passeriformes
- Family: Paridae
- Genus: Parus
- Species: P. monticolus

Binomial name
- Parus monticolus Vigors, 1831

= Green-backed tit =

Species of bird

The green-backed tit (Parus monticolus) is a species of bird in the family Paridae.

It is found in Bangladesh, Bhutan, China, India, Laos, Myanmar, Nepal, Pakistan, Taiwan and Vietnam.

Its natural habitats are boreal forest, temperate forest, and subtropical or tropical moist lowland forest.
