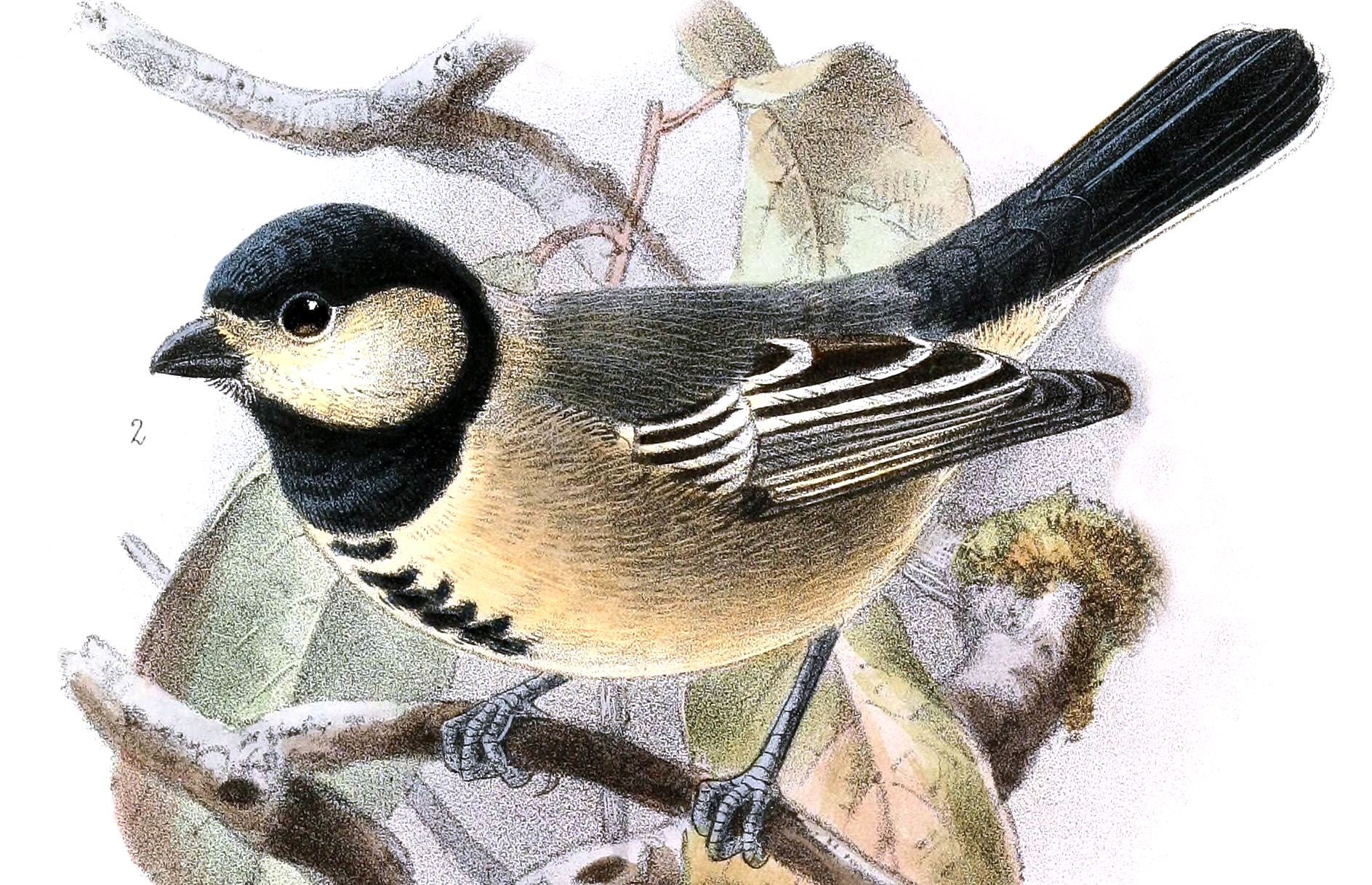

Conservation status
- Least Concern (IUCN 3.1)

Scientific classification
- Kingdom: Animalia
- Phylum: Chordata
- Class: Aves
- Order: Passeriformes
- Family: Paridae
- Genus: Melaniparus
- Species: M. thruppi

Binomial name
- Melaniparus thruppi (Shelley, 1885)
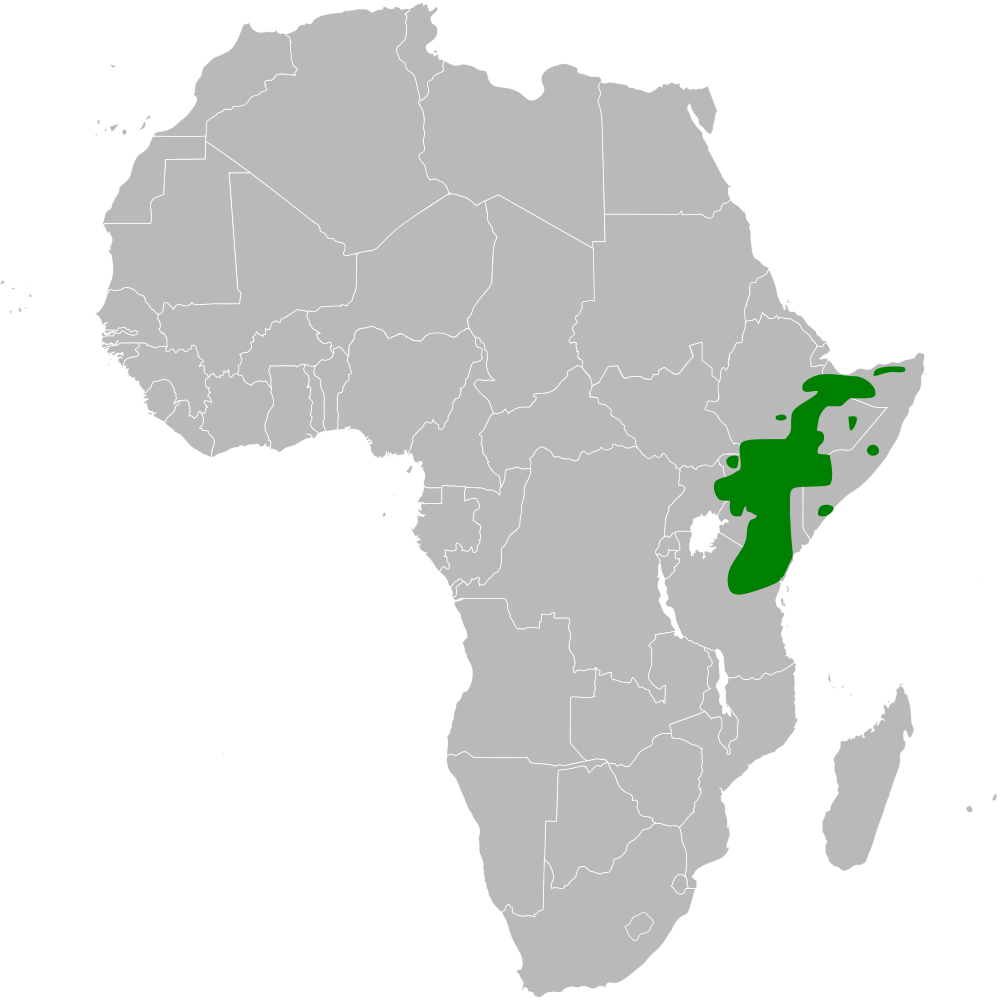
- resident range

Synonyms
- Parus thruppi Shelley, 1885

= Acacia tit =

Species of bird

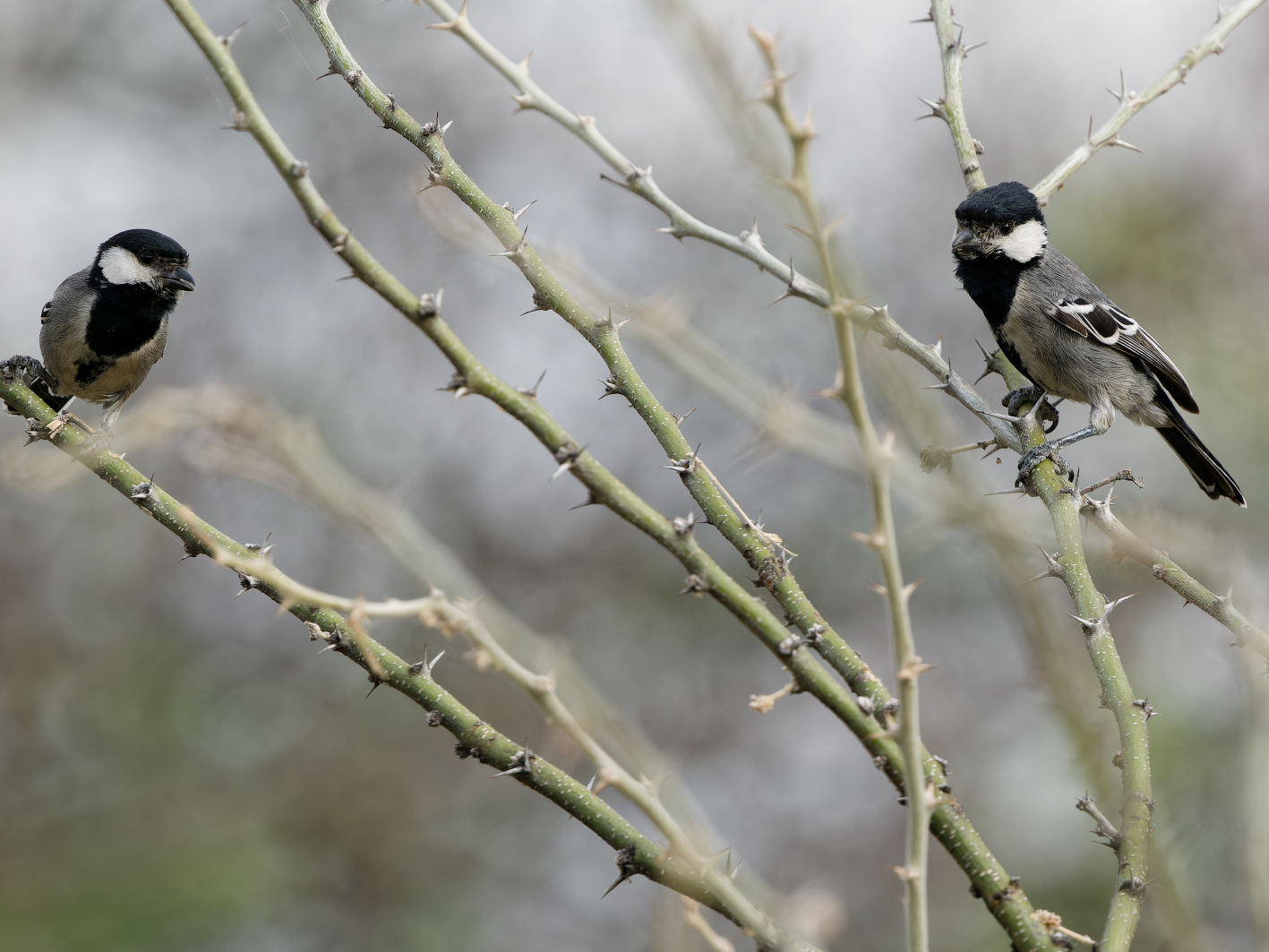
Melaniparus thruppi

The acacia tit (Melaniparus thruppi), also known as the Somali tit and northern grey tit, is a species of bird in the family Paridae. It is native to north eastern Africa where it occurs in dry acacia habitat.

== Description ==
The smallest of the grey Melaniparus tits of Africa, the acacia tit has a glossy blue-black cap, nape, throat and breast contrasting with a large buffy white patch which extends from the bill to the sides of the neck. There is a broad black band which stretches from the breast to the vent. The upperparts are grey with white panels in the wings and there is a white spot on the nape. The underparts are greyish white, broken by the black band. Legs and bill are slate grey. The females tend to have a narrower band than males. Juveniles are similar to the adults but are duller. It measures 11.5–12 cm (4.5–4.7 in) in length and weighs 12 g (0.42 oz).

== Distribution and habitat ==
The acacia tit is found from Ethiopia and Somalia south to north eastern Tanzania.

The acacia tit inhabits arid and semi arid wooded and bushed savanna, principally in acacia and stands of trees along streams or rivers, avoiding truly arid regions. It is recorded up to 2,000 m (6,600 ft) in Somalia.

== Habits ==
The acacia tit is found in pairs or small parties and occasionally joins mixed species foraging flocks. The food consists of small invertebrates, principally wasps, beetles and caterpillars. It nests in holes in trees and one nest found had been predated by a snake but otherwise the habits and ecology of this species are poorly known.

== Taxonomy ==
The acacia tit was formerly one of the many species in the genus Parus but was moved to Melaniparus after a molecular phylogenetic analysis published in 2013 showed that the members of the new genus formed a distinct clade. It forms a superspecies with the southern grey tit and probably also the miombo tit and ashy tit. All of these species have been treated as conspecific with the Palearctic great tit but they are not now thought to be closely related to that species.

=== Subspecies ===
There are two currently recognised subspecies, they are:

- Melaniparus thruppi thruppi Shelley, 1885: Ethiopia and Somalia
- Melaniparus thruppi barakae Jackson, 1899: south western Somalia to Kenya, Uganda and north eastern Tanzania.
