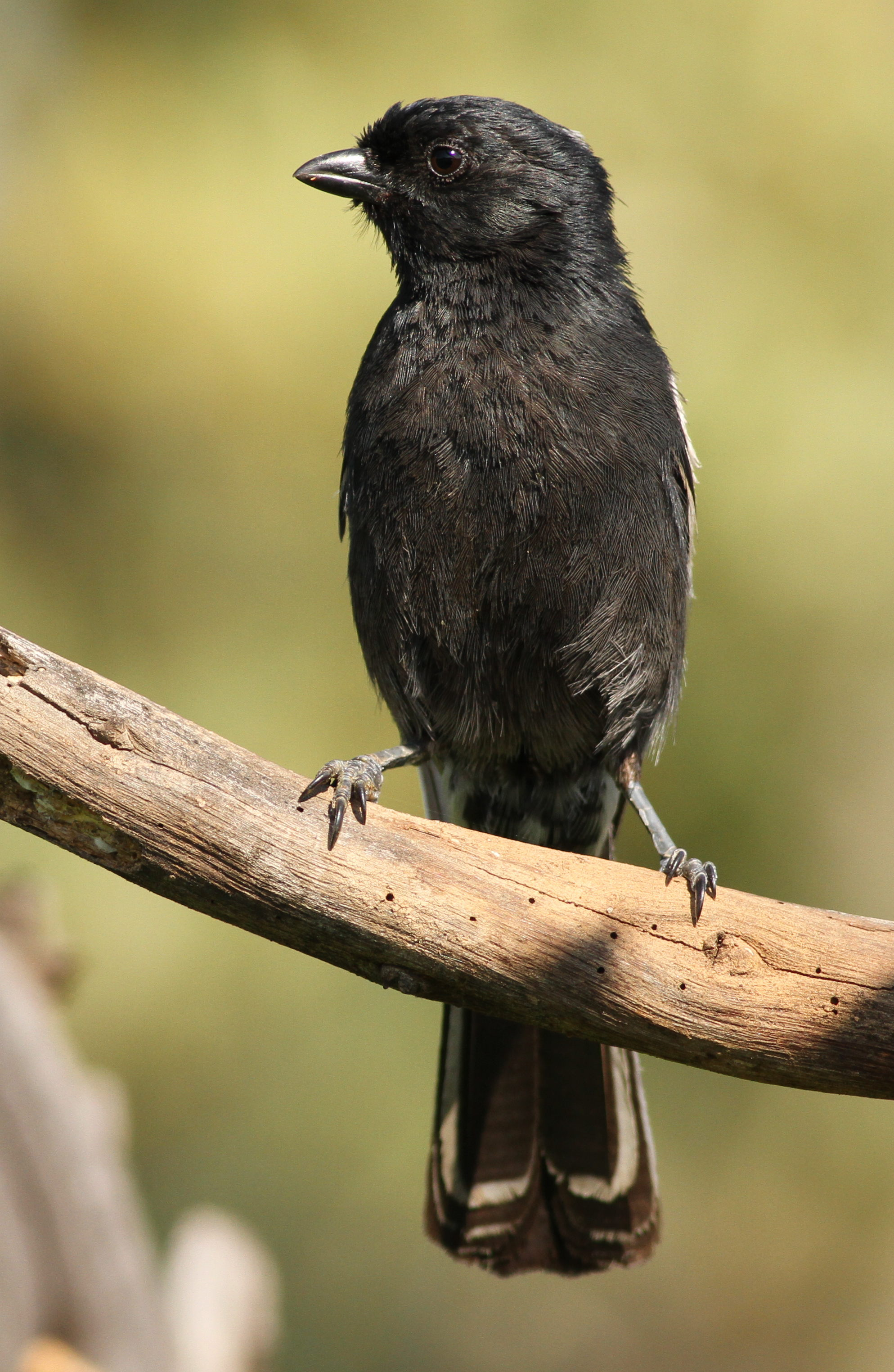

Conservation status
- Least Concern (IUCN 3.1)

Scientific classification
- Kingdom: Animalia
- Phylum: Chordata
- Class: Aves
- Order: Passeriformes
- Family: Paridae
- Genus: Melaniparus
- Species: M. niger

Binomial name
- Melaniparus niger (Vieillot, 1818)
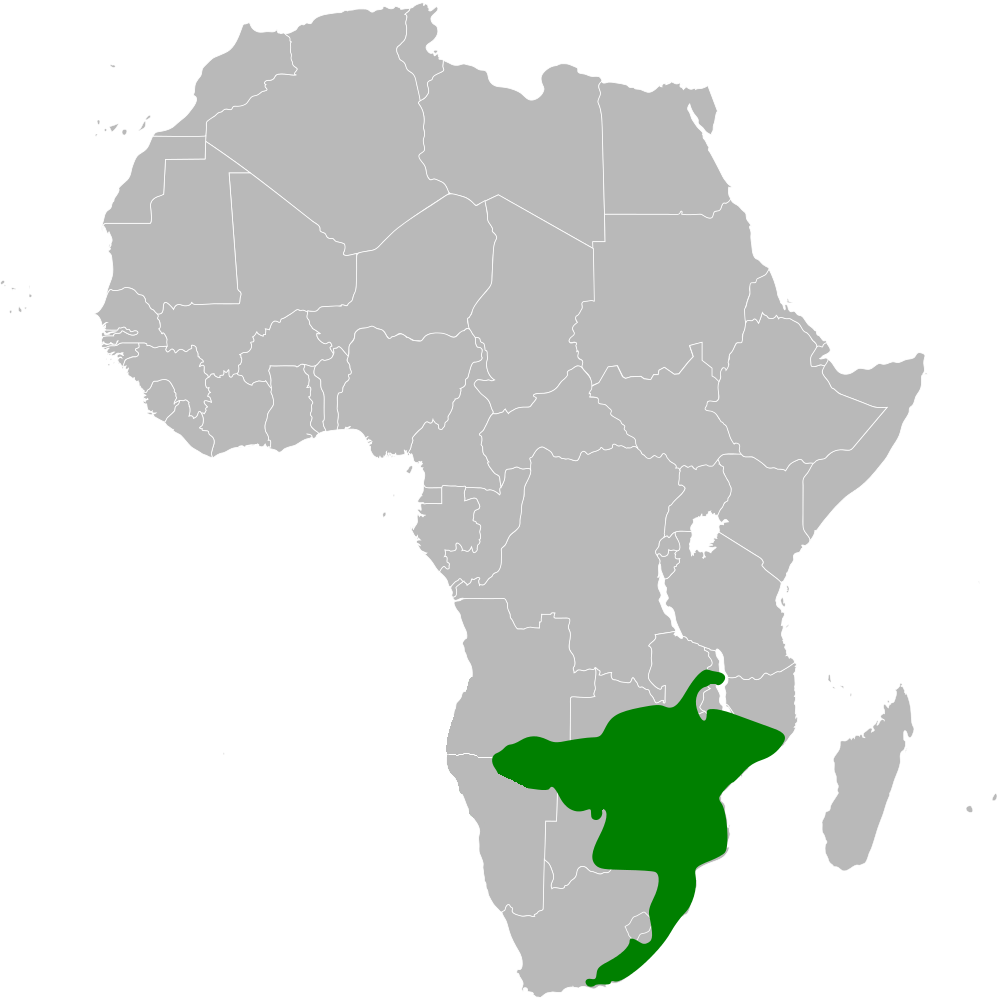
- resident range

Synonyms
- Parus niger

= Southern black tit =

Species of bird

The southern black tit or simply black tit (Melaniparus niger) is a species of bird in the tit family Paridae, which is native to woodland habitats in southern Africa.

== Subspecies ==
Three subspecies are recognized:

- Melaniparus niger niger – southernmost Mozambique to Eswatini, KwaZulu-Natal and Eastern Cape
- Melaniparus niger xanthostomus – southern Angola to northern Namibia, northern Botswana, northwestern Zimbabwe, southern Zambia and southern Tanzania
- Melaniparus niger ravidus – eastern Zambia, Malawi, Zimbabwe, Mozambique, eastern Botswana and northern South Africa

== Range and habitat ==
It occurs chiefly in tropical and subtropical savanna woodland, in a semicircular arc from Angola to the Eastern Cape, South Africa. It prefers woodland dominated by broad-leaved trees, most importantly miombo, Combretum species, and Burkea africana. It is especially common in the woodlands of western Zimbabwe, where densities can reach as high as fifty birds per square kilometre.

== Description ==
The southern black tit, unlike parids of the Northern Hemisphere or other local species, is almost entirely monotone in colour and sexually somewhat dimorphic, with the female being greyish and the male very distinctly blue-black in colour. It can be distinguished from the white-winged tit and Carp's tit by having no white rim in its tail and is around 16 centimetres (6 in) in total length including the tail.

== Food ==
Like all tits, it feeds chiefly on insects, and is a voracious consumer of wasps in its favoured habitat; however, it has unusually for a parid been known to take nectar and fruiting figs.

== Breeding ==
Breeding occurs during the summer wet season, but its initiation is very varied and the number of broods reared depends on the consistency of rainfall. The breeding system of the southern black tit has been intensively studied and is often regarded as a classic example of the differences in breeding strategies between warm regions with unpredictable rainfall and cold regions with severe winters. Unlike the great tit or blue tit which can provision up to twenty-five nestlings per year in unassisted pairs, the southern black tit, living on a much poorer food supply, can as an unassisted pair seldom provision even one nestling in a breeding season. As a result, most males must stay in the parental territory for several years to help rear the usually three nestlings that each breeding female produces under favourable conditions. An interesting feature of the southern black tit is that the breeding female, who incubates continuously during the fifteen days of incubation and is fed by her mate and the helpers, will mimic venomous snakes when she feels threatened to prevent depredation of the nest.

== Longevity ==
Although the species has been recovered from ringing on only a few occasions and data about survival and longevity are thus useless, it is practically certain that the adult mortality rate is much lower than the 70 to 75 percent mortality of closely related parids in Europe and North America.

== Taxonomy ==
The southern black tit was formerly one of the many species in the genus Parus but was moved to Melaniparus after a molecular phylogenetic analysis published in 2013 showed that the members of the new genus formed a distinct clade.

== Gallery ==
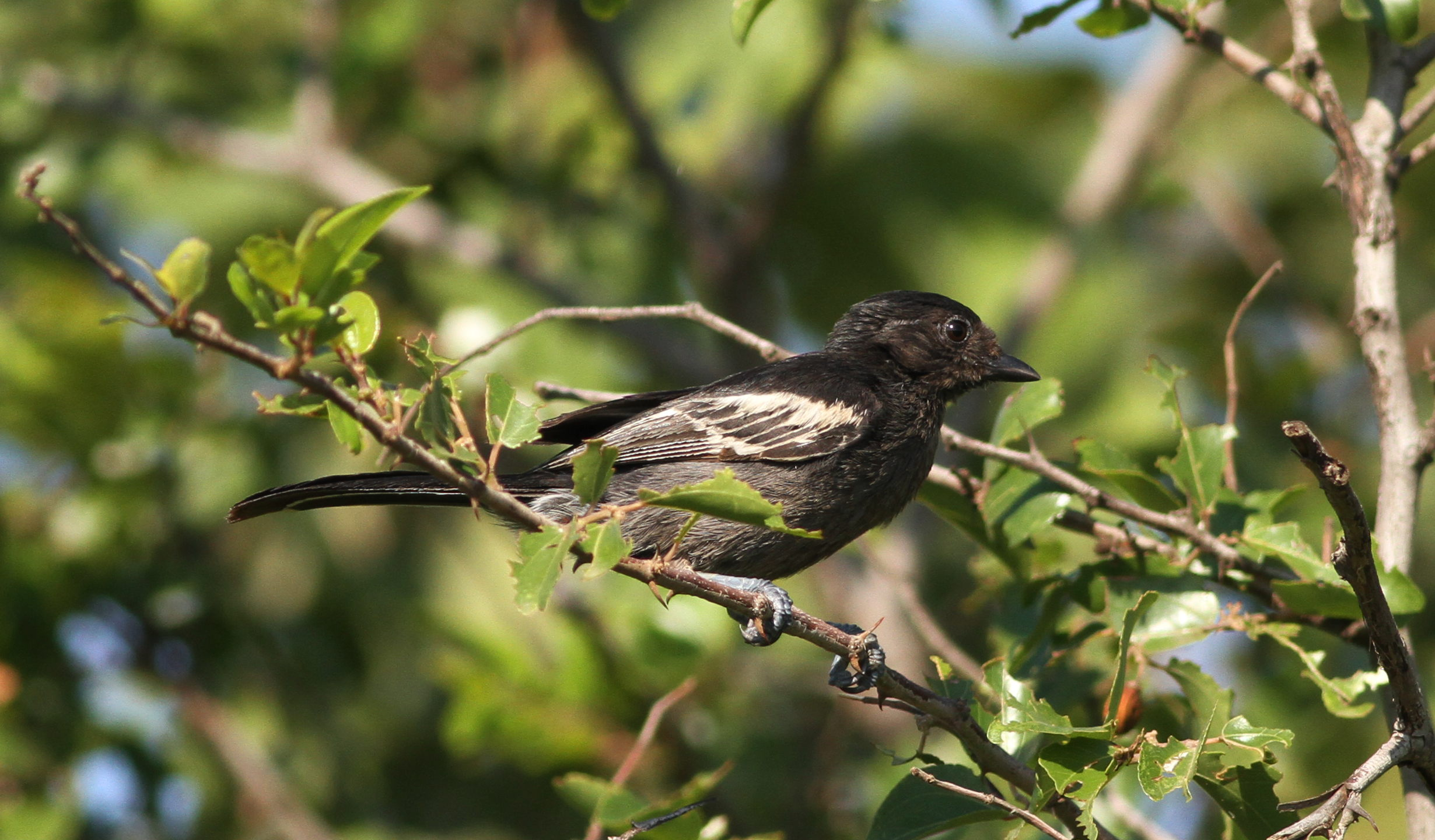

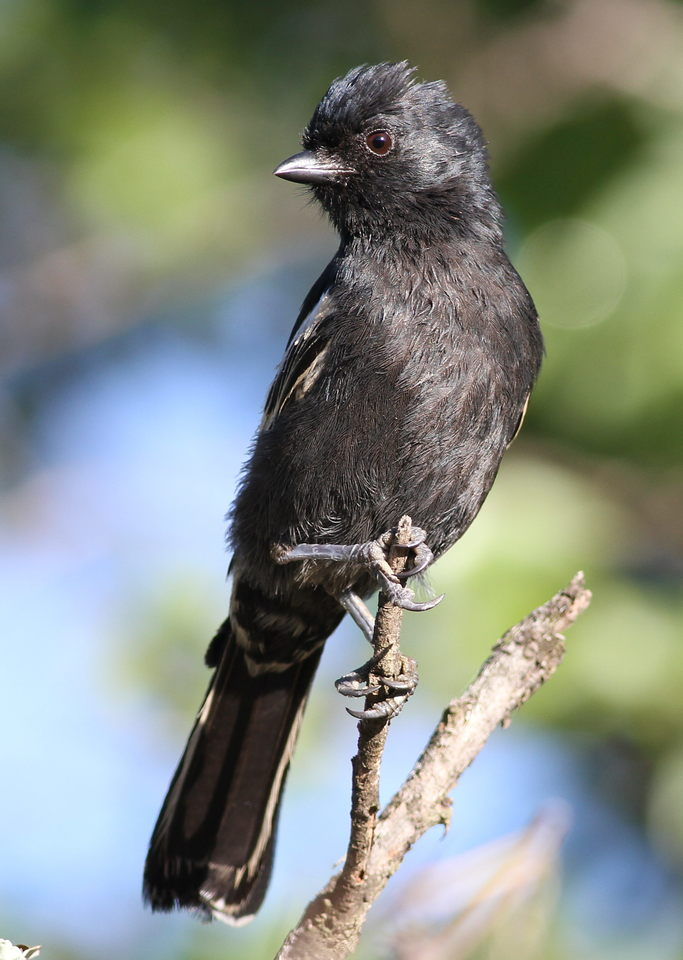

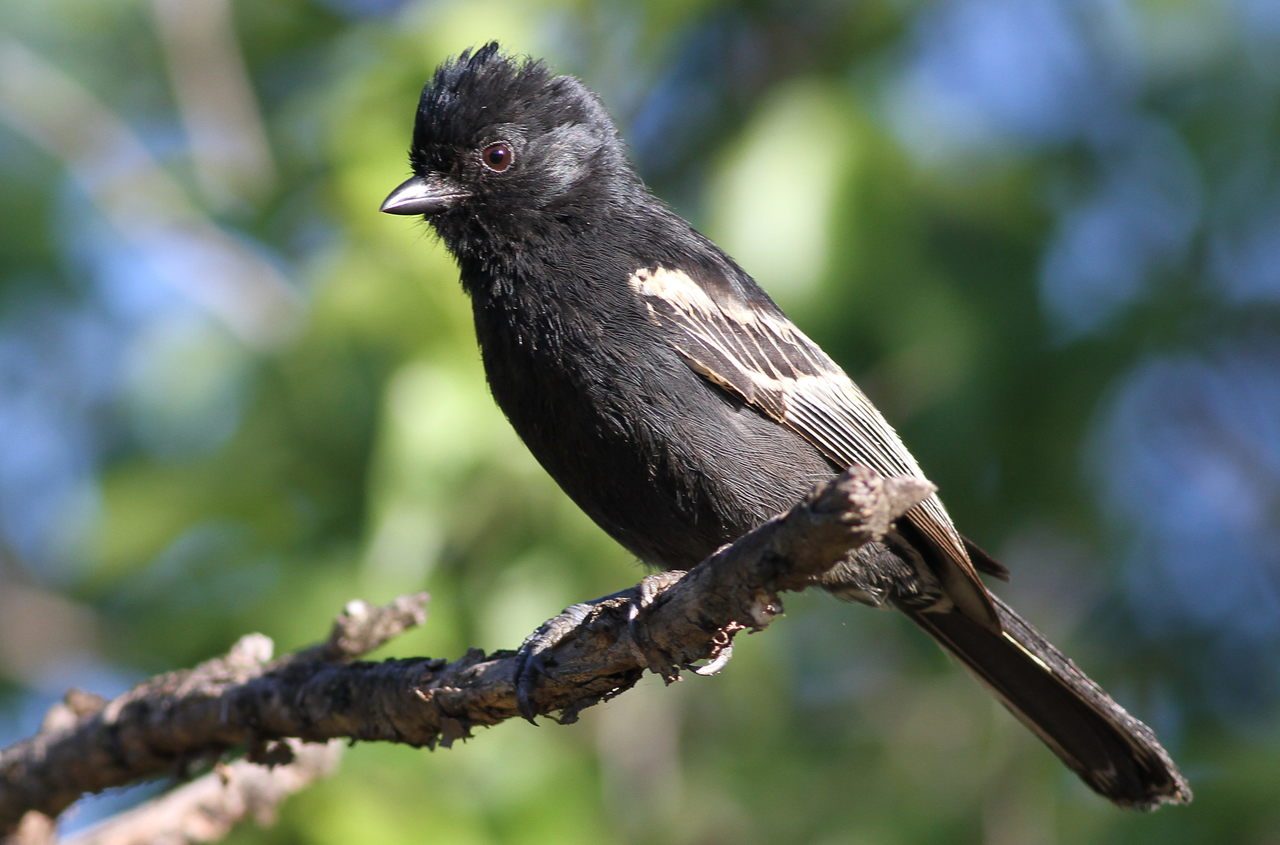

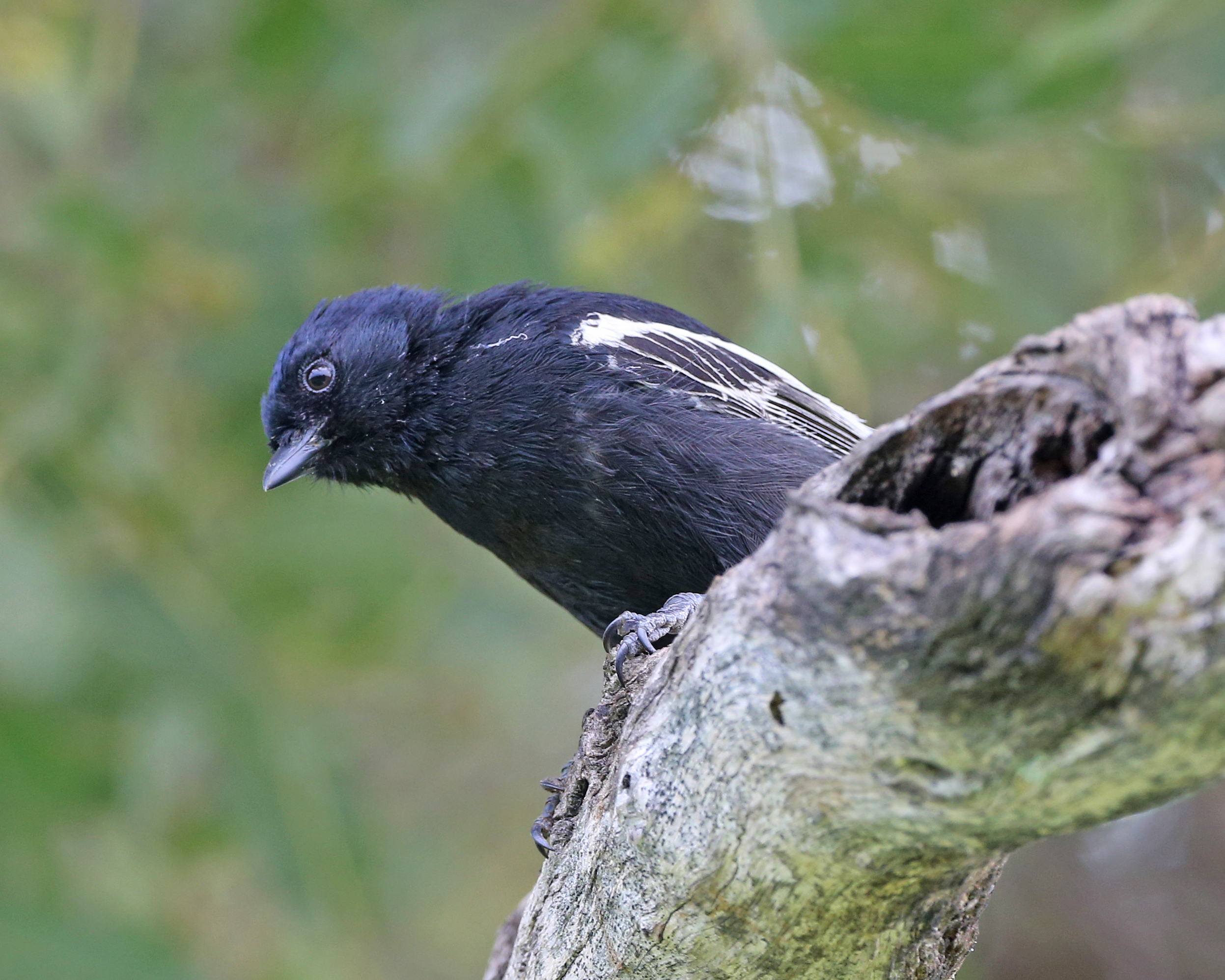

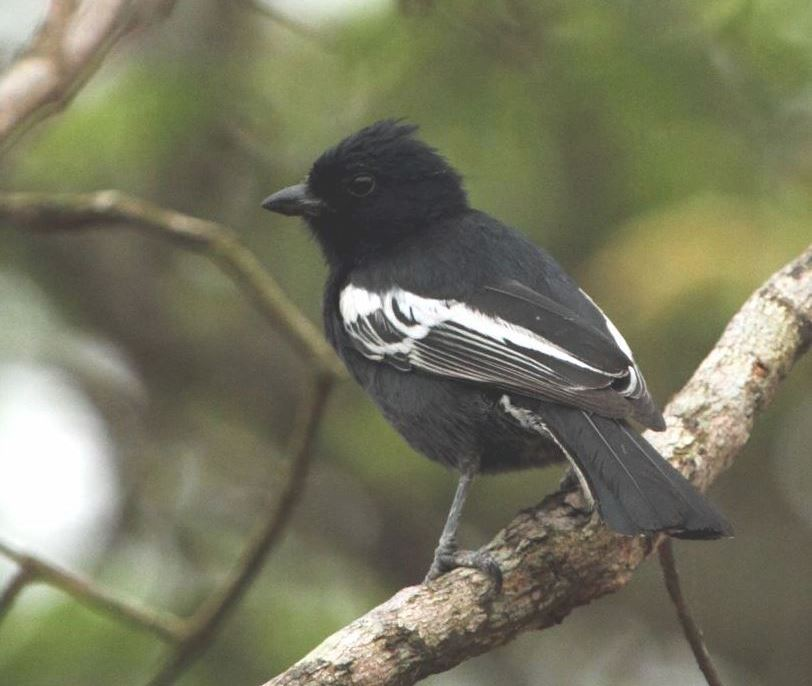
