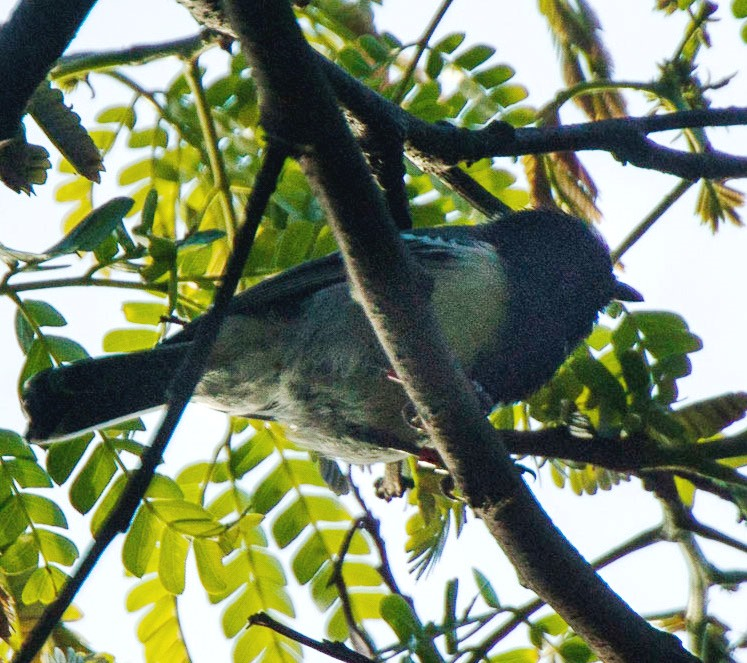

Conservation status
- Least Concern (IUCN 3.1)

Scientific classification
- Kingdom: Animalia
- Phylum: Chordata
- Class: Aves
- Order: Passeriformes
- Family: Paridae
- Genus: Melaniparus
- Species: M. fasciiventer

Binomial name
- Melaniparus fasciiventer (Reichenow, 1893)
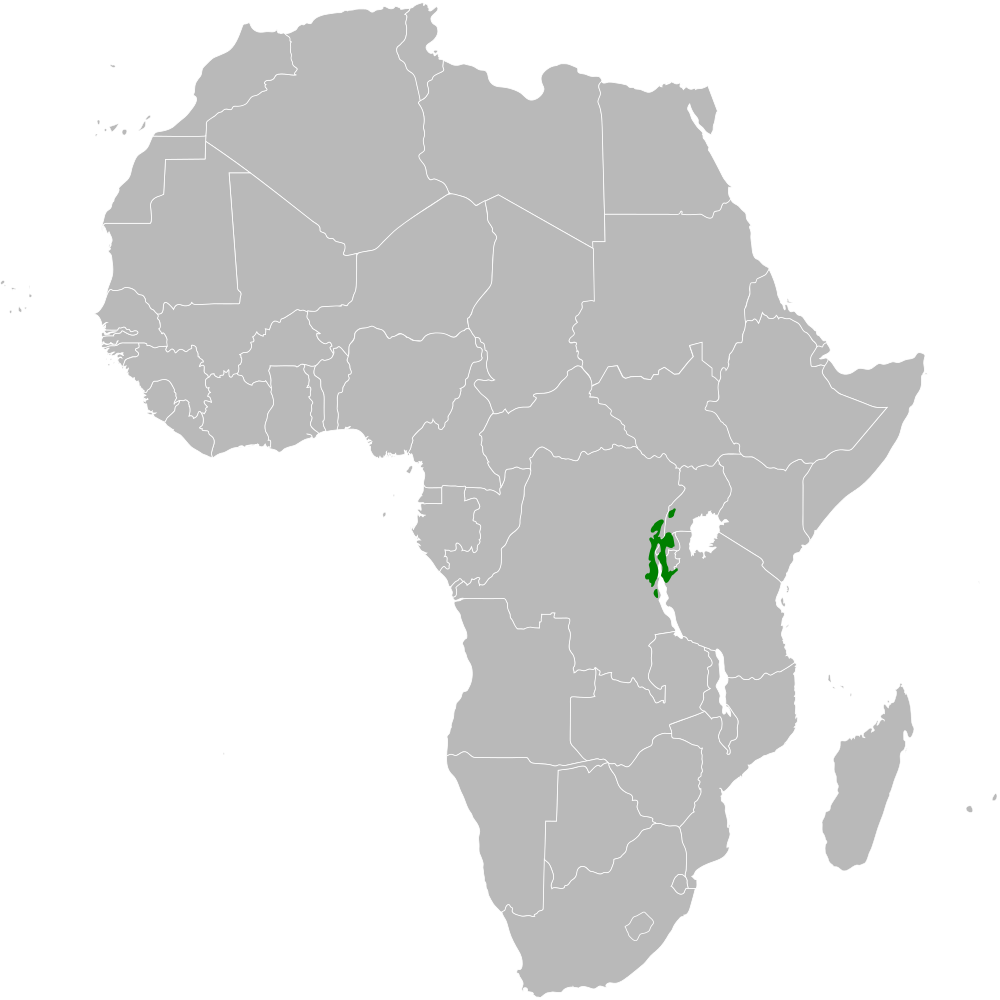
- resident range

Synonyms
- Parus fasciiventer

= Stripe-breasted tit =

Species of bird

The stripe-breasted tit (Melaniparus fasciiventer) is a species of bird in the family Paridae. It is native to the Albertine Rift montane forests in east-central Africa.

The stripe-breasted tit was formerly one of the many species in the genus Parus but was moved to Melaniparus after a molecular phylogenetic analysis published in 2013 showed that the members of the new genus formed a distinct clade.
