= Red-throated tit =

Conservation status
- Least Concern (IUCN 3.1)

Scientific classification
- Kingdom: Animalia
- Phylum: Chordata
- Class: Aves
- Order: Passeriformes
- Family: Paridae
- Genus: Melaniparus
- Species: M. fringillinus

Binomial name
- Melaniparus fringillinus (Fischer & Reichenow, 1884)
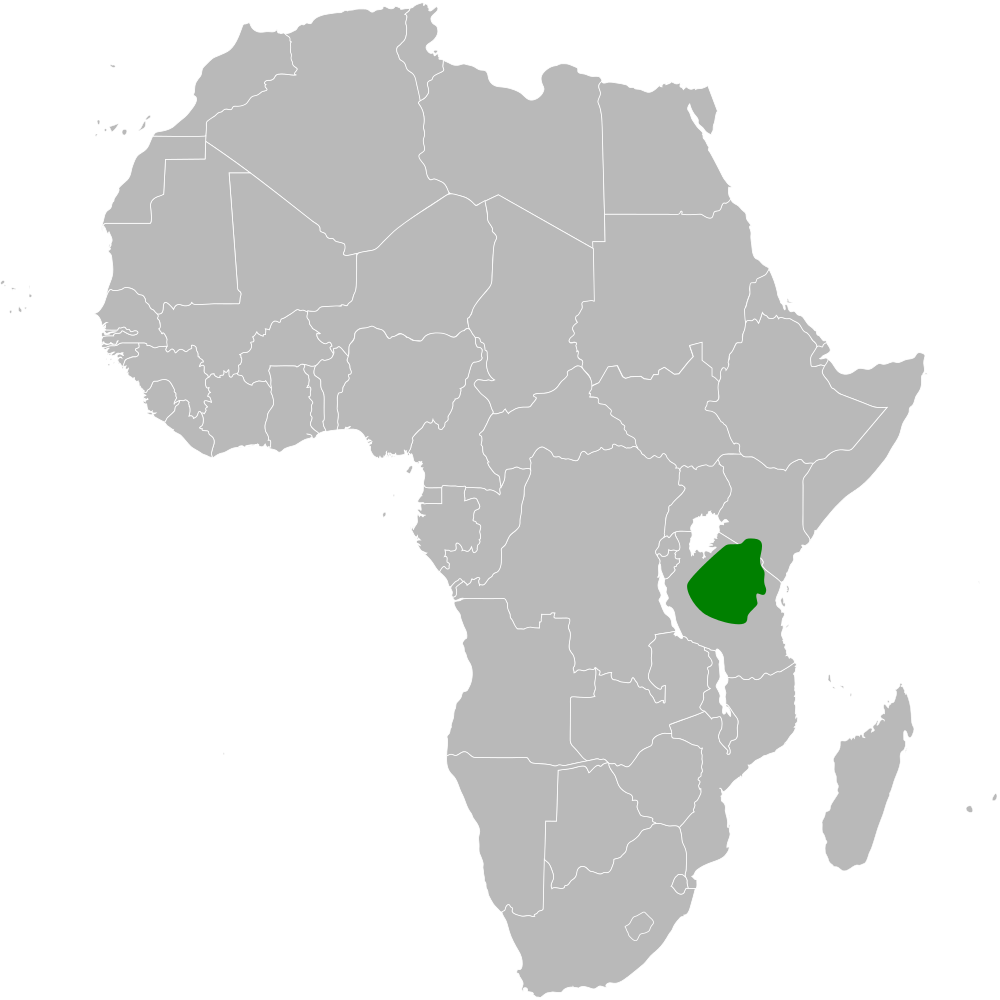
- resident range

Synonyms
- Parus fringillinus

Species of bird

The red-throated tit (Melaniparus fringillinus) is a species of bird in the family Paridae. It is found in Kenya and Tanzania, where its natural habitat is dry savanna.

The red-throated tit was formerly one of the many species in the genus Parus but was moved to Melaniparus after a molecular phylogenetic analysis published in 2013 showed that the members of the new genus formed a distinct clade.
