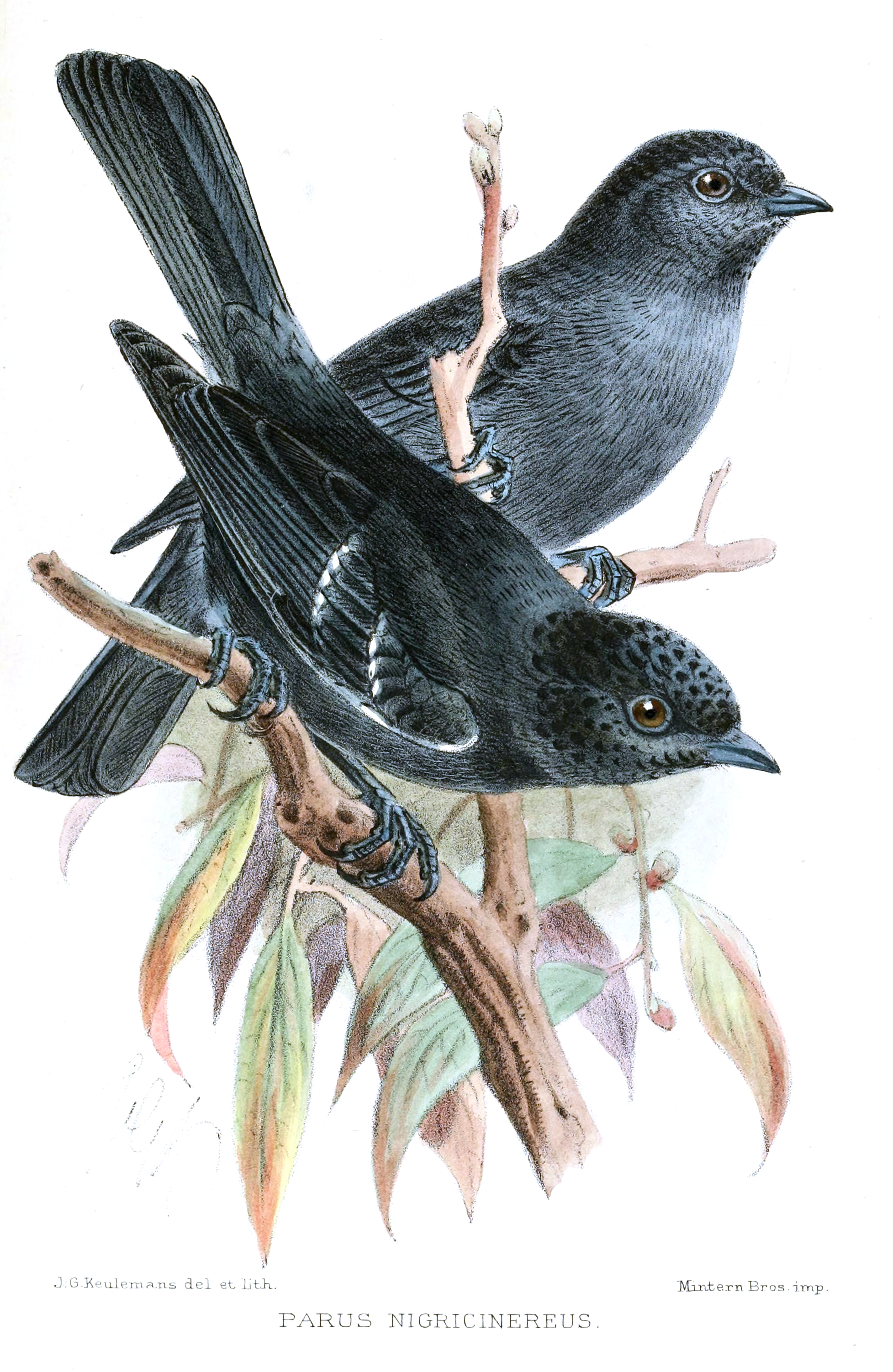

Conservation status
- Least Concern (IUCN 3.1)

Scientific classification
- Kingdom: Animalia
- Phylum: Chordata
- Class: Aves
- Order: Passeriformes
- Family: Paridae
- Genus: Melaniparus
- Species: M. funereus

Binomial name
- Melaniparus funereus Verreaux & Verreaux, 1855
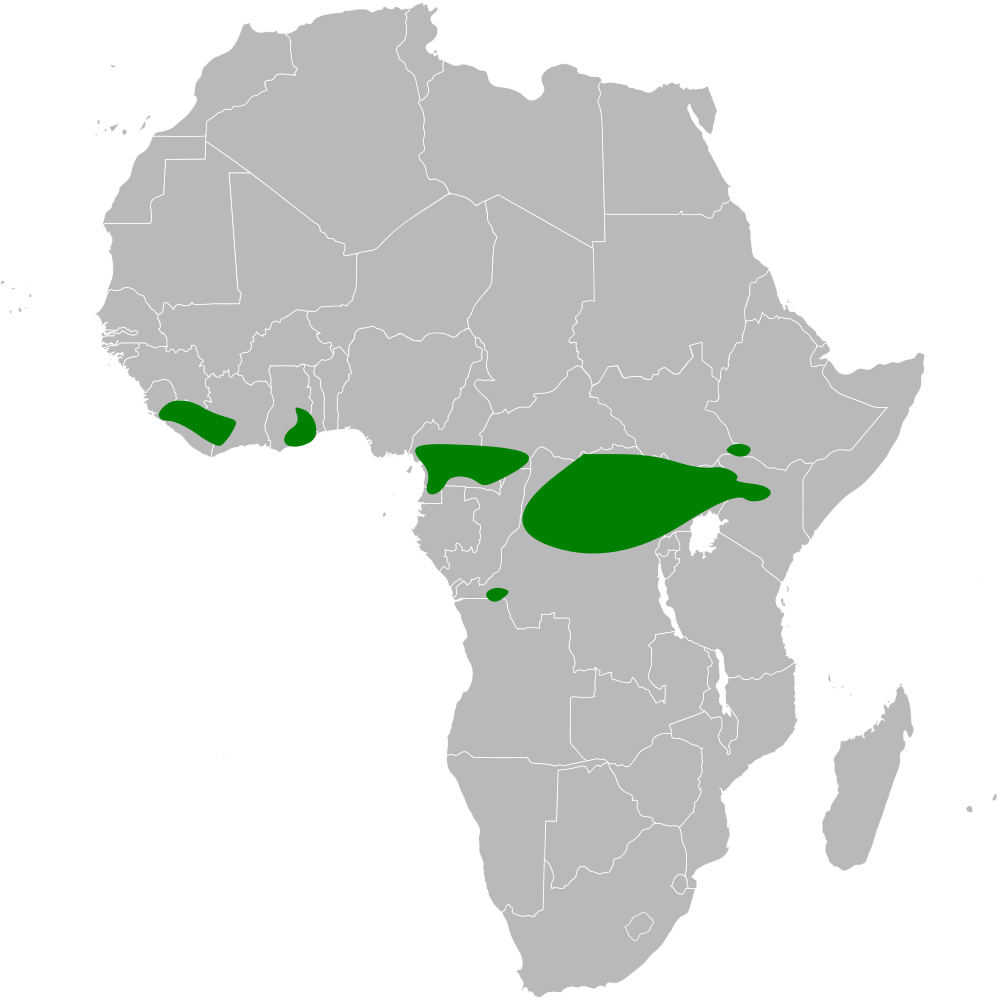
- resident range

Synonyms
- Parus funereus

= Dusky tit =

Species of bird

The dusky tit (Melaniparus funereus) is a species of bird in the tit family Paridae. It is native to the African tropical rainforest.

The dusky tit was formerly one of the many species placed in the genus Parus. It was moved to the resurrected genus Melaniparus based on a molecular phylogenetic analysis published in 2013.

This bird has an unknown population size in the middle of Africa. The dusky tit is known for being almost entirely black with brownish or gray tones, depending on its sex. It is a relatively minor bird to a medium-sized bird; it may range from 13 to 15 cm depending on the sex. It is characterized by red eyes and a chirp that sounds like "dree di-di-di".

== Characteristics ==
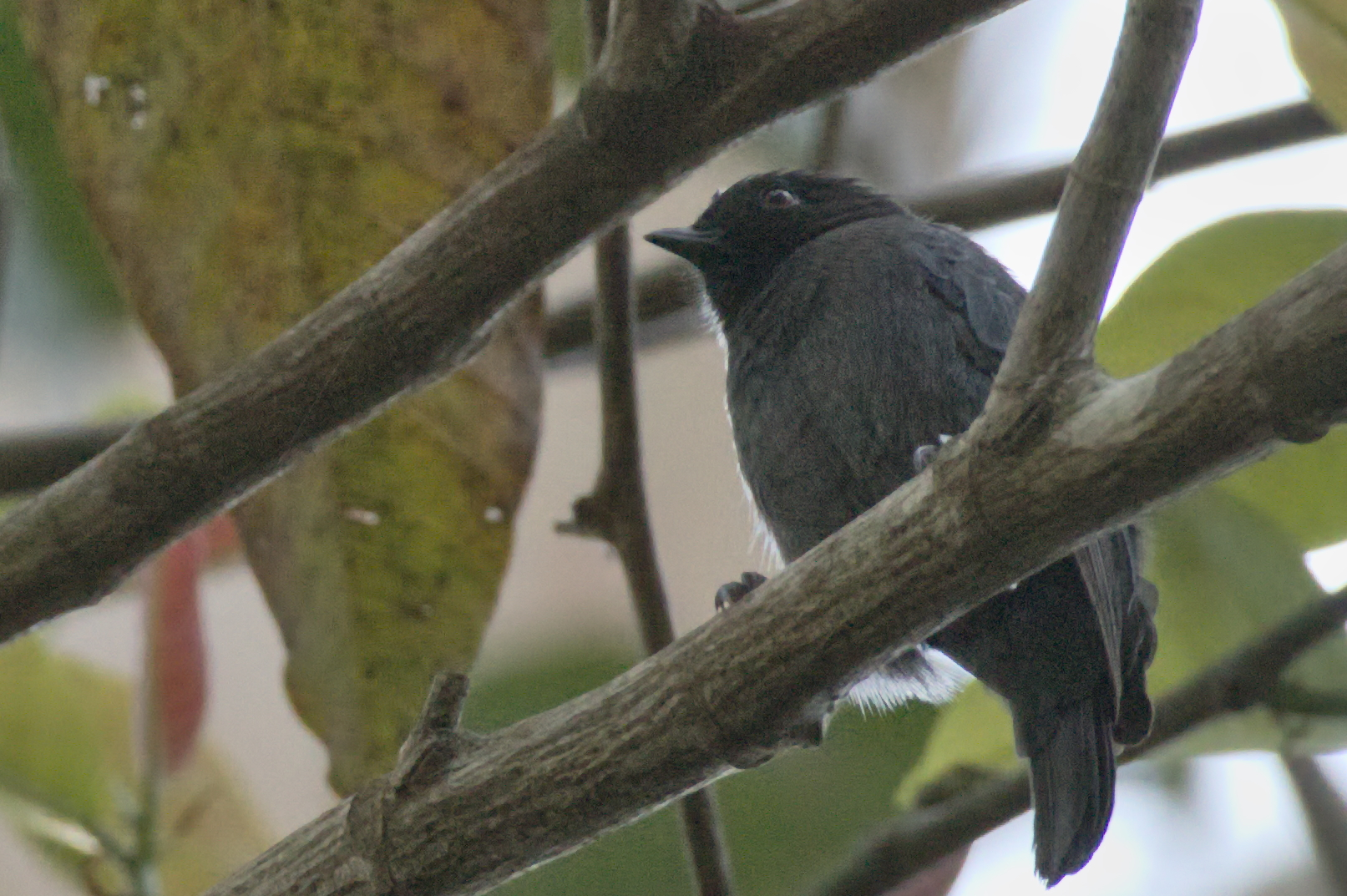
Dusky tit in Angola

Dusky tit in Uganda

The males are mostly black, and the only distinct color resides in the eyes. The eyes will almost always be primarily red, but can vary from red to orange-red. Another key feature is its bill, which is smaller and thus easier to identify. In general, the male is the dominant sex. Therefore, its length will vary more towards the 14-15 cm mark.

The female has similar characteristics as the male; however, the upper body parts are more blackish-gray. Their tail is fringed gray and brown; however, the bill is still small, and they have red or orange eyes. In general, the females have lighter features than the males, as the females' underparts and faces are relatively more gentle than those of a male. The female's size is between 13 and 14 cm.

The dusky tit juvenile holds the same characteristics as the male; however, its upper parts are more blackish brown, and no glossy feathers are portrayed in the females.

== Range and habitat ==
The birds primarily live in humid forests around central Africa, including Angola, the DR Congo, South Sudan, Uganda, Liberia, Ghana, and Kenya. They are mostly found in old plantations, edges of cultivation, and forests.

== Diet ==
The dusky tit mainly feeds on small invertebrates, beetles, and orthopterans, micro-lepidopterans, but also consumes seeds and fruits.

== Population size ==
The dusky tit has a decreasing population; it takes approximately 4.2 years to regenerate and repopulate. Currently, the population size is located in a range of 20,000 km2. This population size has yet to be quantified entirely, but it is not believed to approach thresholds of vulnerability for the species.

== Behavior ==
The bird travels and surrounds itself in pairs or within a group. They also join mixed-species groups of flocks. They are known for their vocalizations, the sound of "dree di-di-di."
