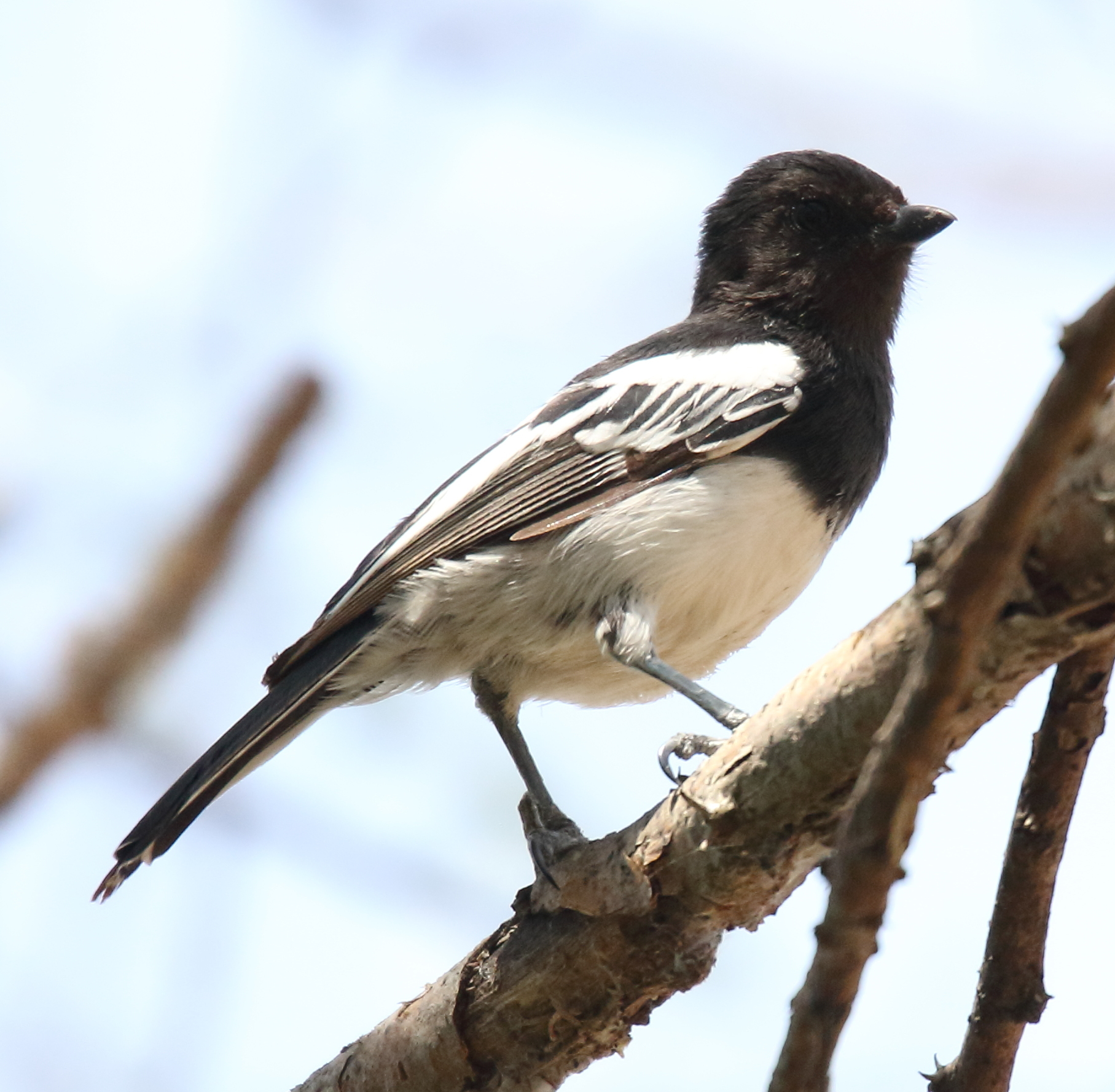

Conservation status
- Least Concern (IUCN 3.1)

Scientific classification
- Kingdom: Animalia
- Phylum: Chordata
- Class: Aves
- Order: Passeriformes
- Family: Paridae
- Genus: Melaniparus
- Species: M. albiventris

Binomial name
- Melaniparus albiventris (Shelley, 1881)
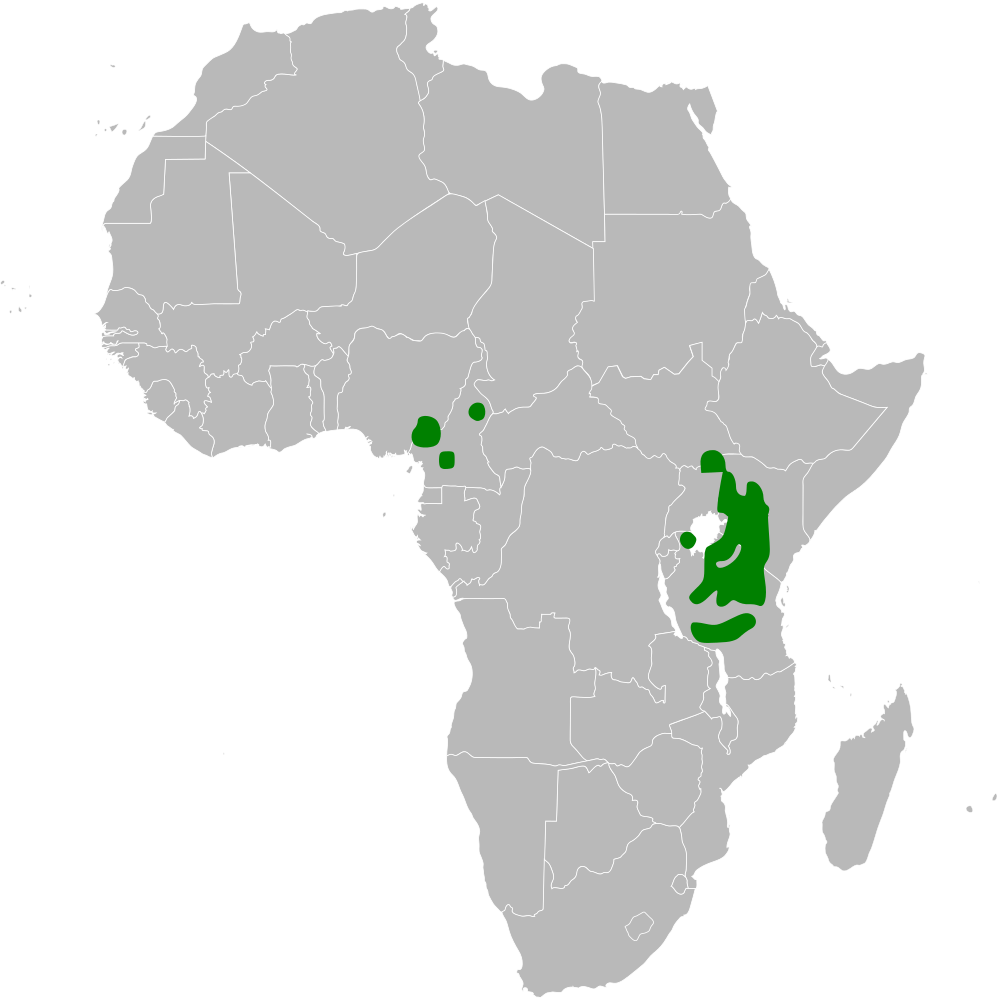
- resident range

Synonyms
- Parus albiventris

= White-bellied tit =

Species of bird

The white-bellied tit (Melaniparus albiventris) is a species of bird in the family Paridae. It is found in Cameroon, Kenya, Nigeria, South Sudan, Tanzania, and Uganda. Its natural habitats are subtropical or tropical dry forests and subtropical or tropical moist montane forests.

The white-bellied tit was formerly one of the many species in the genus Parus but was moved to Melaniparus after a molecular phylogenetic analysis published in 2013 showed that the members of the new genus formed a distinct clade.

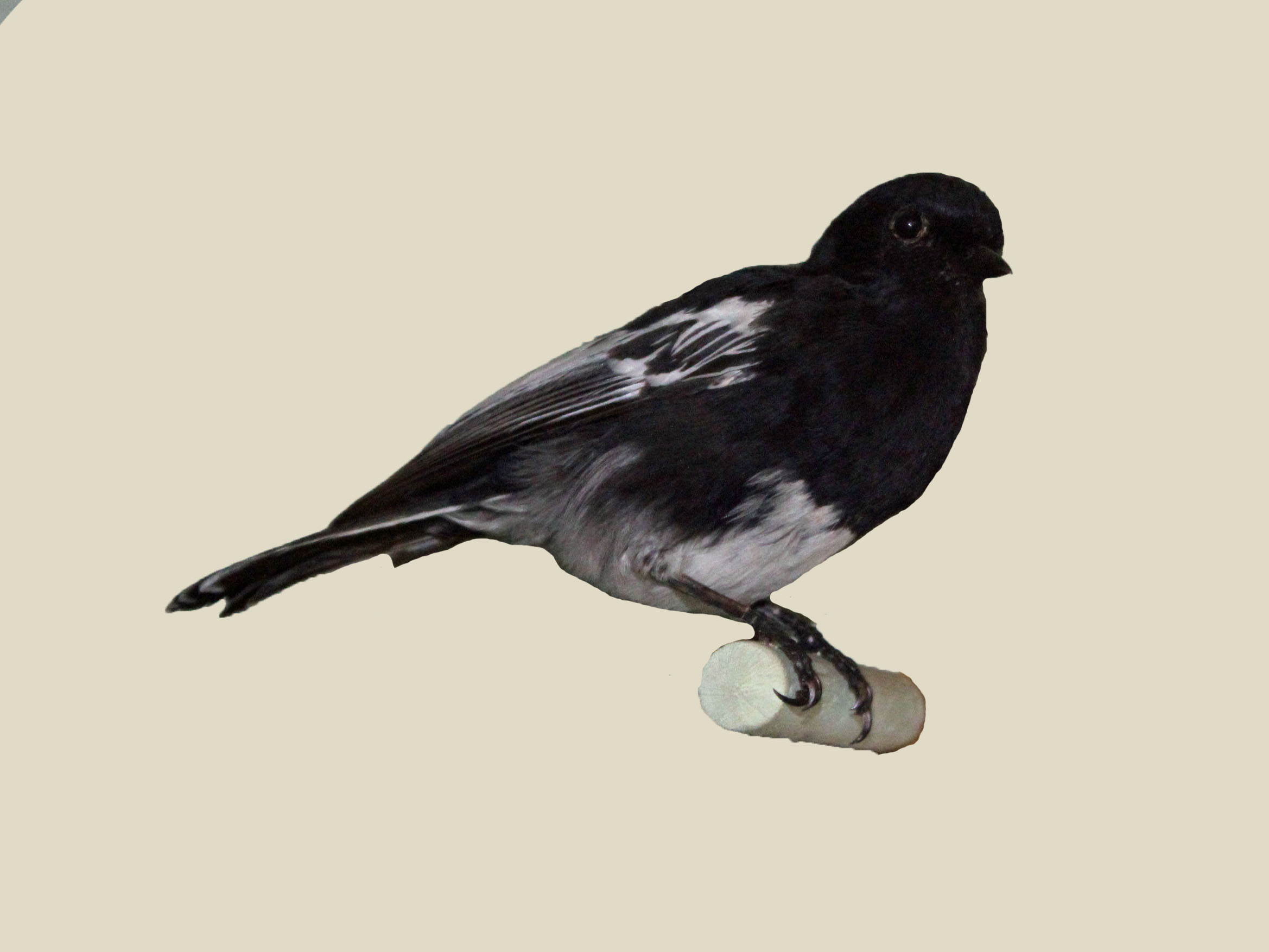
Specimen at Nairobi National Museum
