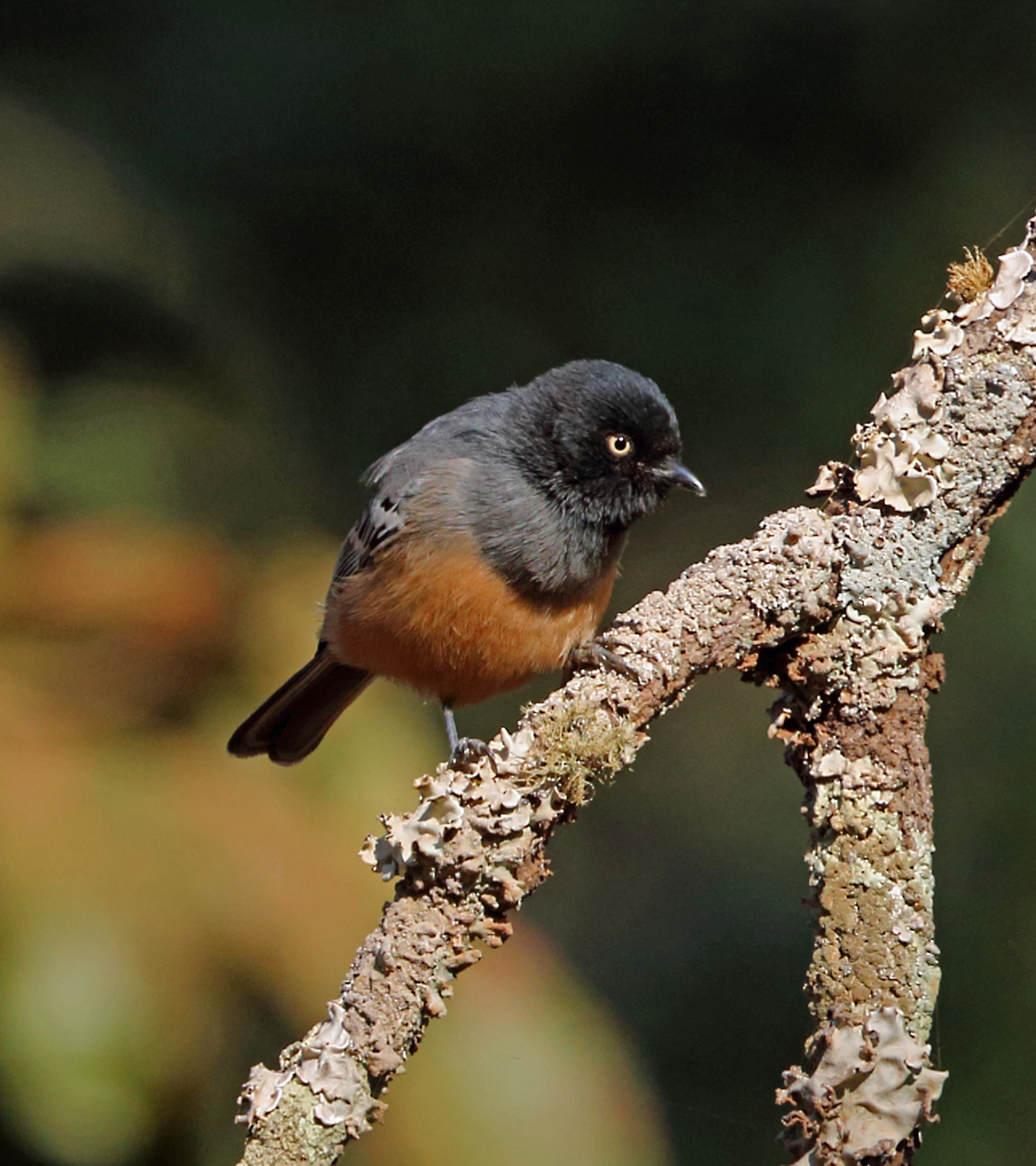
- Melaniparus rufiventris (Rufous-bellied tit)

Scientific classification
- Kingdom: Animalia
- Phylum: Chordata
- Class: Aves
- Order: Passeriformes
- Family: Paridae
- Genus: Melaniparus; Bonaparte, 1850

Type species
- Parus niger Vieillot, 1818

Species
- See text

= Melaniparus =

Genus of birds

Melaniparus is a genus of birds in the tit family that are found in sub-Saharan Africa.

== Taxonomy ==
The species now assigned to this genus were formerly placed in the speciose genus Parus but were moved to Melaniparus based on a molecular phylogenetic analysis published in 2013 that showed that the members formed a distinct clade. The genus Melaniparus had originally been introduced by the French naturalist Charles Lucien Bonaparte in 1850. The type species was subsequently designated as the southern black tit (Melaniparus niger). The name of the genus combines the Ancient Greek melas, melanos "black" and the genus Parus introduced by Carl Linnaeus in 1758.

The following 14 species, all from Africa and mostly having dark plumage, have been placed in the genus:

Image	Scientific name	Common name	Distribution
	Melaniparus guineensis	White-shouldered black tit	Africa from Senegal in the west to Kenya and Ethiopia in the east
	Melaniparus leucomelas	White-winged black tit	central Africa, from Angola in the west to Ethiopia in the east
	Melaniparus niger	Southern black tit	Angola to the Eastern Cape, South Africa
	Melaniparus carpi	Carp's tit	Angola and Namibia
	Melaniparus albiventris	White-bellied tit	Cameroon, Kenya, Nigeria, South Sudan, Tanzania, and Uganda
	Melaniparus leuconotus	White-backed black tit	Eritrea and Ethiopia.
	Melaniparus funereus	Dusky tit	Angola, Cameroon, Central African Republic, Republic of the Congo, Democratic Republic of the Congo, Ivory Coast, Gabon, Ghana, Guinea, Kenya, Liberia, Rwanda, Sierra Leone, South Sudan, and Uganda
	Melaniparus rufiventris	Rufous-bellied tit	Republic of the Congo, Democratic Republic of the Congo, Angola, Zambia, Namibia and Botswana
	Melaniparus fringillinus	Red-throated tit	Kenya and Tanzania
	Melaniparus fasciiventer	Stripe-breasted tit	Burundi, Democratic Republic of the Congo, Rwanda, and Uganda.
	Melaniparus thruppi	Acacia tit or Somali Tit	Ethiopia and Somalia south to north eastern Tanzania
	Melaniparus griseiventris	Miombo tit	Angola, Democratic Republic of the Congo, Malawi, Mozambique, Tanzania, Zambia, and Zimbabwe
	Melaniparus cinerascens	Ashy tit	Angola, Botswana, Namibia, South Africa, and Zimbabwe.
	Melaniparus afer	Grey tit	Lesotho and South Africa
