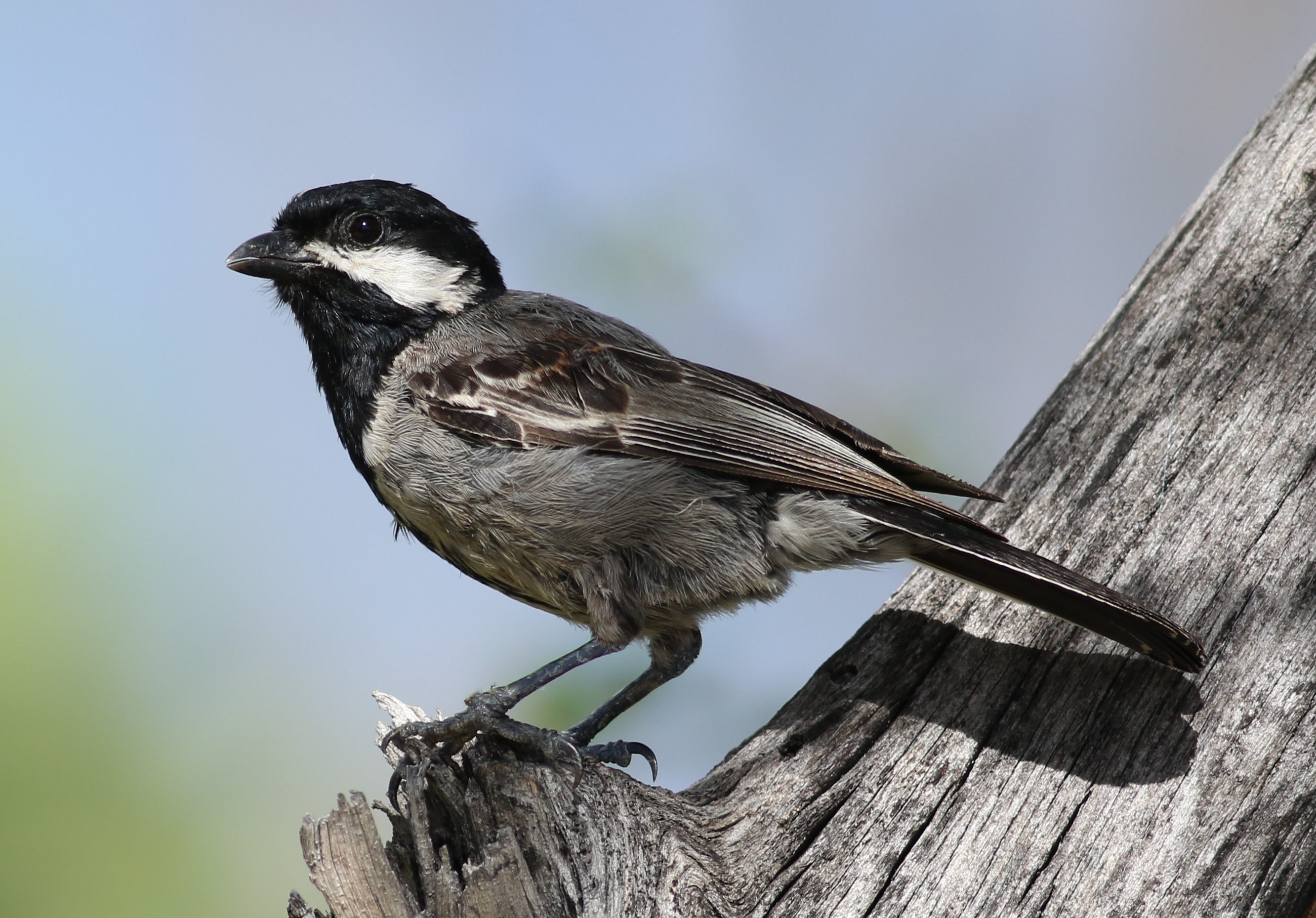
- In Botswana

Conservation status
- Least Concern (IUCN 3.1)

Scientific classification
- Kingdom: Animalia
- Phylum: Chordata
- Class: Aves
- Order: Passeriformes
- Family: Paridae
- Genus: Melaniparus
- Species: M. cinerascens

Binomial name
- Melaniparus cinerascens (Vieillot, 1818)
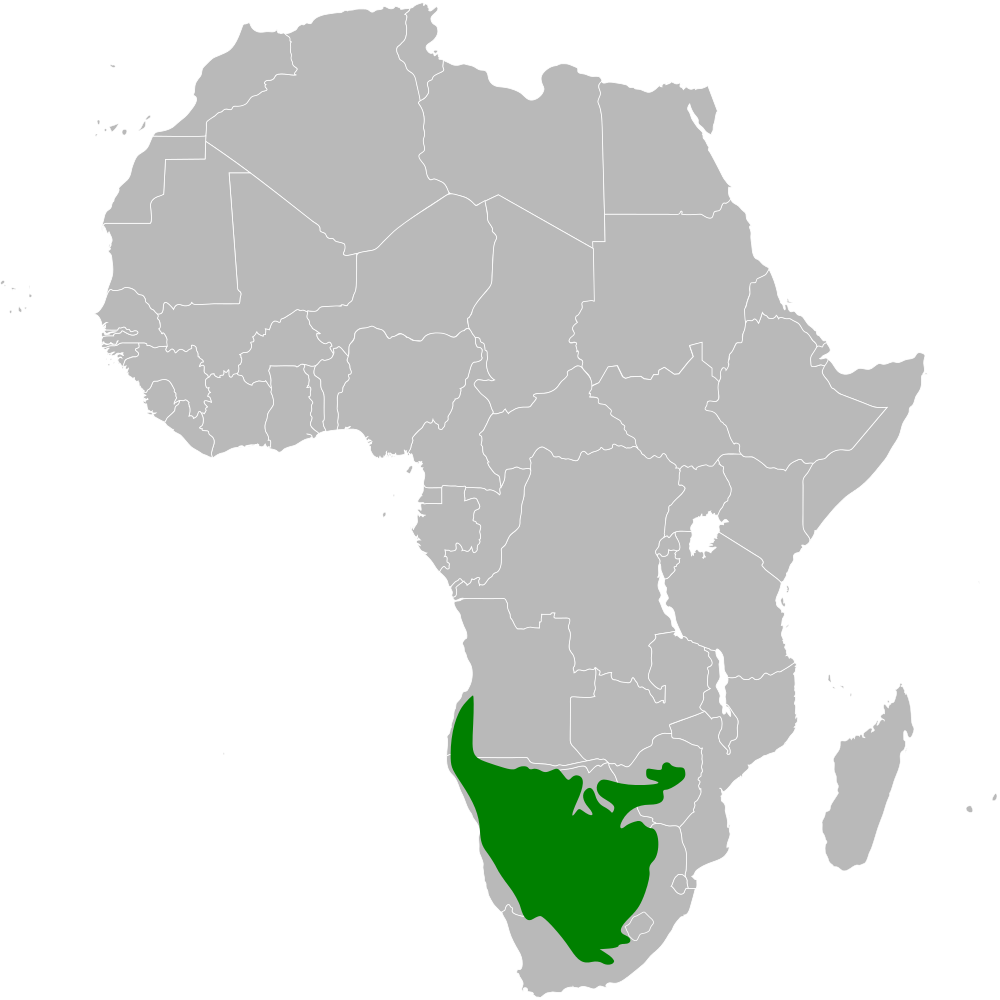
- resident range

Synonyms
- Parus cinerascens

= Ashy tit =

Species of bird

The ashy tit (Melaniparus cinerascens) is a species of bird in the family Paridae. It is found in Angola, Botswana, Namibia, South Africa, and Zimbabwe. Its natural habitats are subtropical or tropical dry forests and dry savanna.

The ashy tit was formerly one of the many species in the genus Parus but was moved to Melaniparus after a molecular phylogenetic analysis published in 2013 showed that the members of the new genus formed a distinct clade.

In Botswana
