= White-backed black tit =

- Melaniparus leuconotus in Ethiopia

Conservation status
- Least Concern (IUCN 3.1)

Scientific classification
- Kingdom: Animalia
- Phylum: Chordata
- Class: Aves
- Order: Passeriformes
- Family: Paridae
- Genus: Melaniparus
- Species: M. leuconotus

Binomial name
- Melaniparus leuconotus (Guérin-Méneville, 1843)
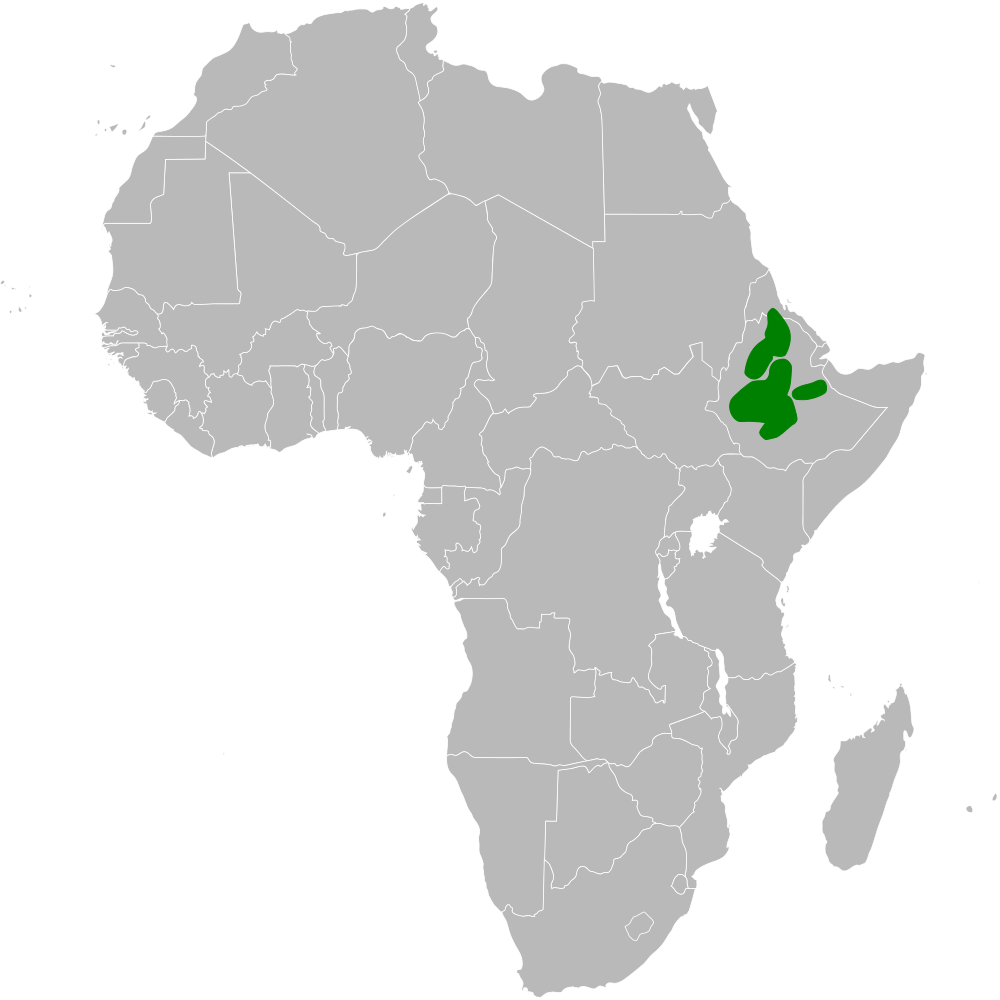
- resident range

Synonyms
- Parus leuconotus

Species of bird

The white-backed black tit (Melaniparus leuconotus), also known as the white-backed tit, is a species of bird in the family Paridae. It is found in Eritrea and Ethiopia. Its natural habitat is boreal forests.

The white-backed black tit was formerly one of the many species in the genus Parus but was moved to Melaniparus after a molecular phylogenetic analysis published in 2013 showed that the members of the new genus formed a distinct clade.
