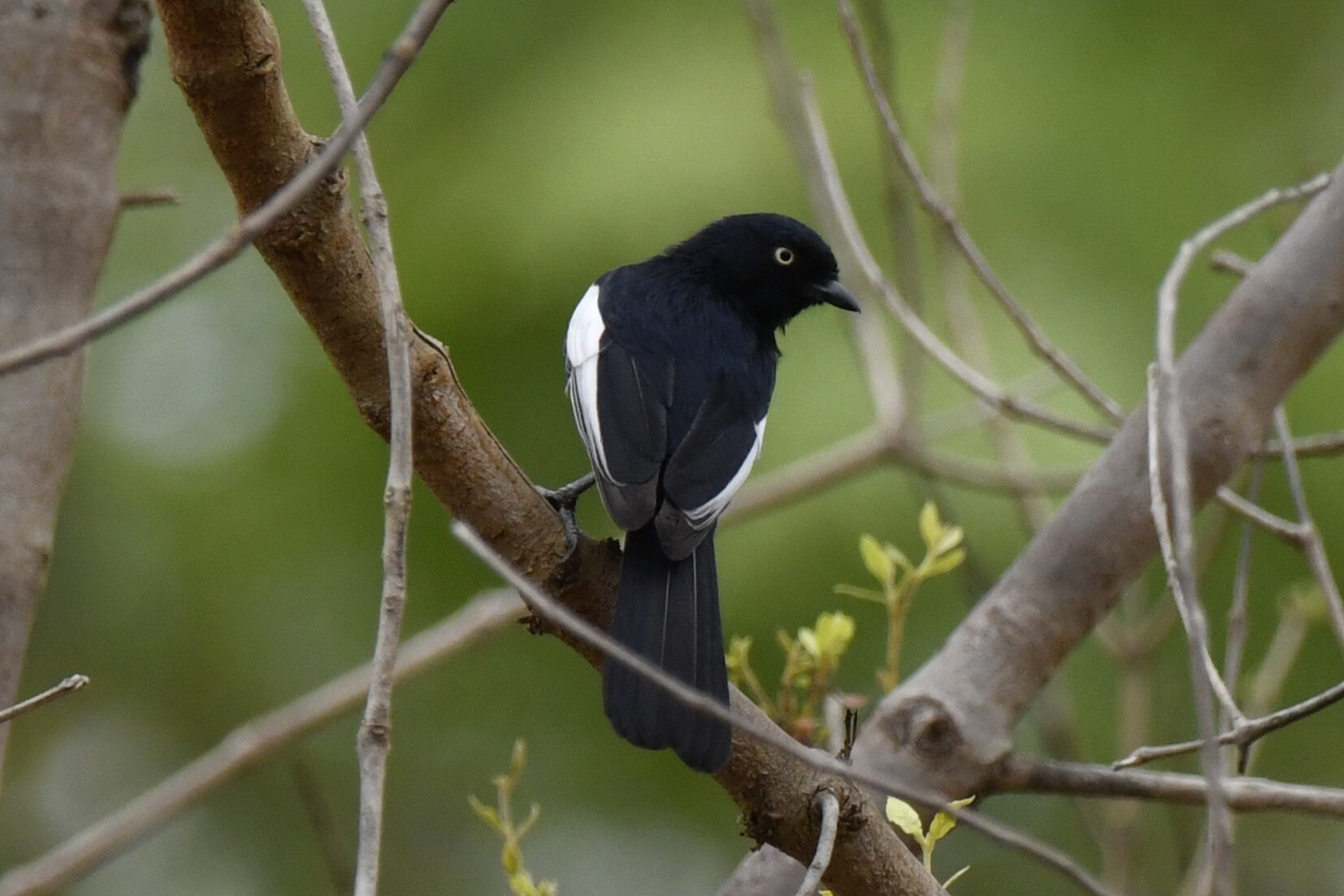

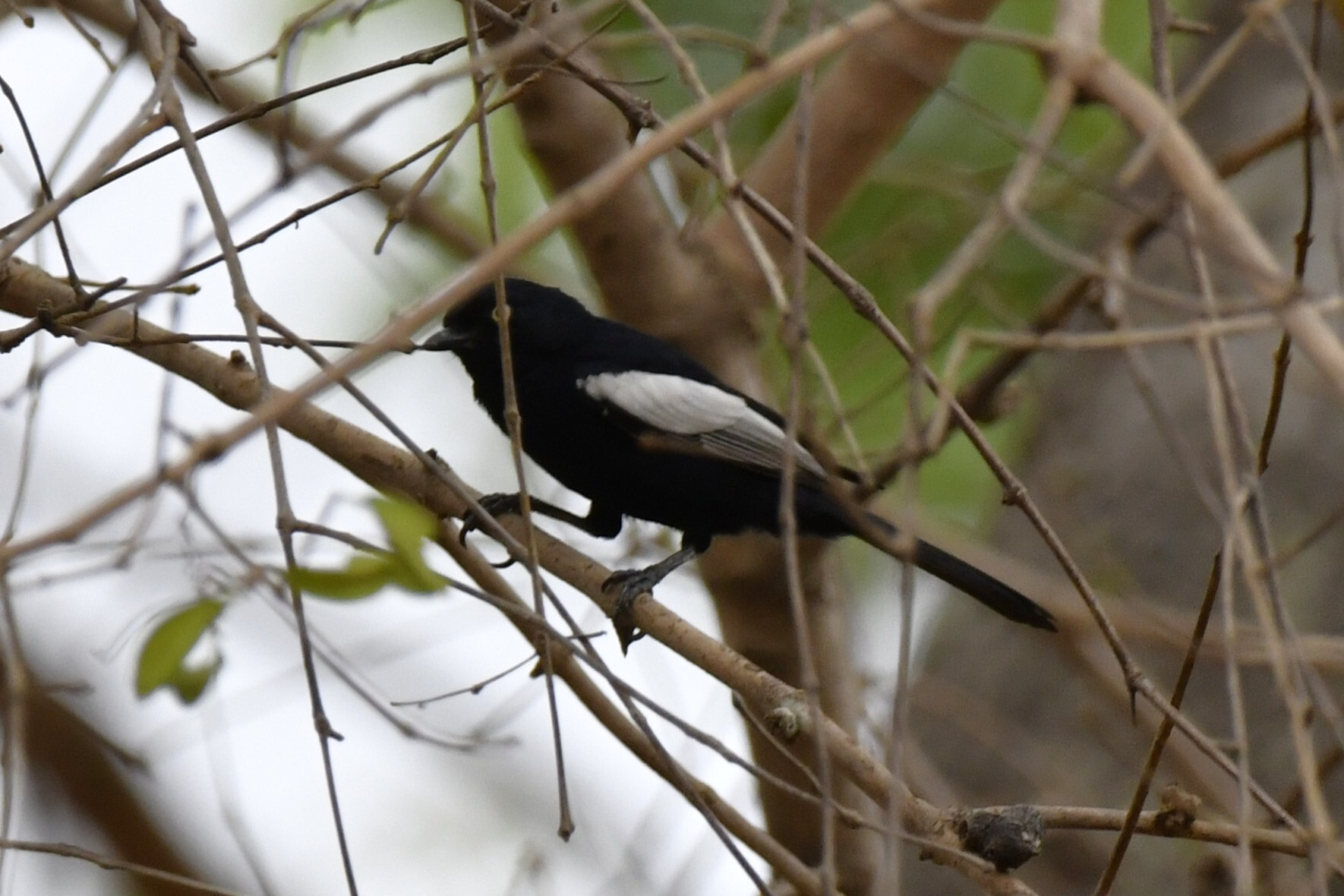

Conservation status
- Least Concern (IUCN 3.1)

Scientific classification
- Kingdom: Animalia
- Phylum: Chordata
- Class: Aves
- Order: Passeriformes
- Family: Paridae
- Genus: Melaniparus
- Species: M. guineensis

Binomial name
- Melaniparus guineensis (Shelley, 1900)
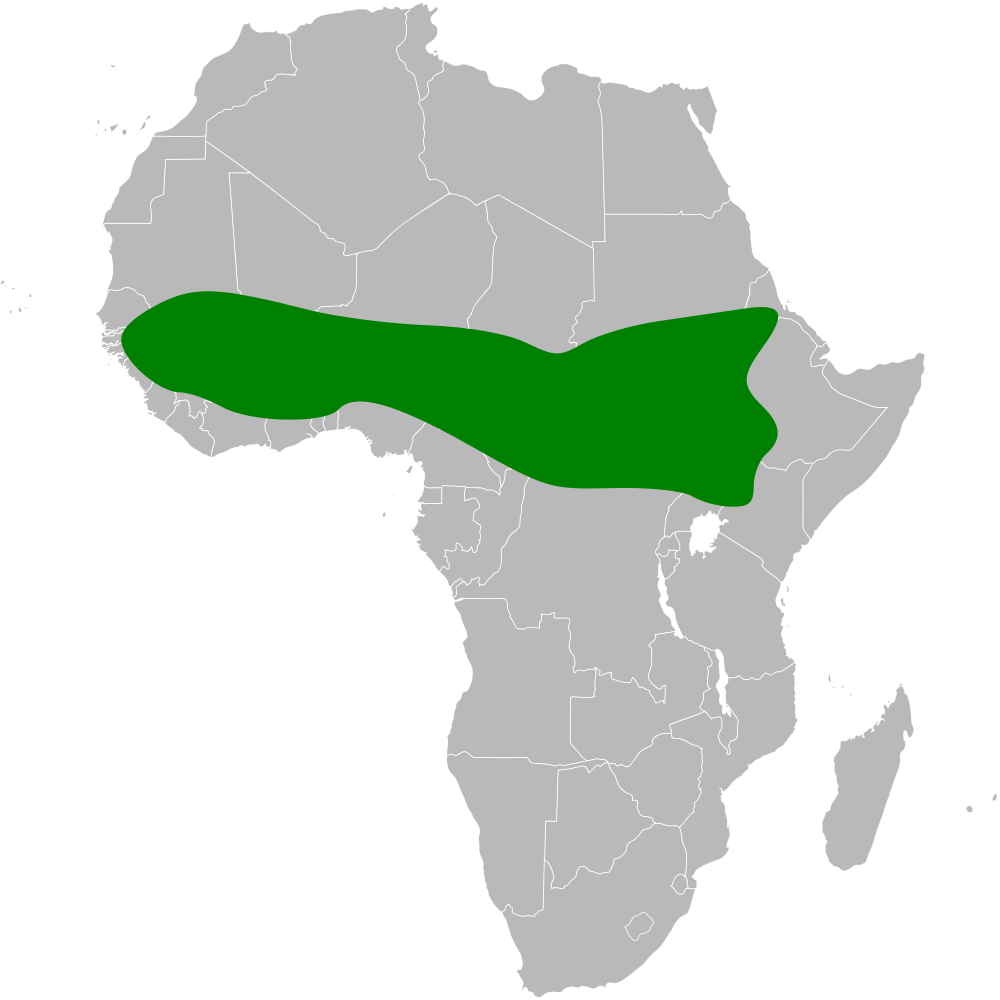
- resident range

Synonyms
- Parus guineensis

= White-shouldered black tit =

Species of bird

The white-shouldered black tit (Melaniparus guineensis), also known as the pale-eyed black tit, is a passerine bird in the tit family. It breeds in a belt across Africa from Senegal in the west to Kenya and Ethiopia in the east. It is sometimes considered conspecific with the more southerly white-winged black tit Melaniparus leucomelas and, like that species, it is mainly black with a white wing patch, but differs in that it has a pale eye.

It is a resident in coniferous woodlands throughout its range, and nests in tree crevices. 4-6 reddish-brown blotched pinkish-white eggs are laid.

The white-shouldered black tit was formerly one of the many species in the genus Parus but was moved to Melaniparus after a molecular phylogenetic analysis published in 2013 showed that birds in the new genus formed a distinct clade.
