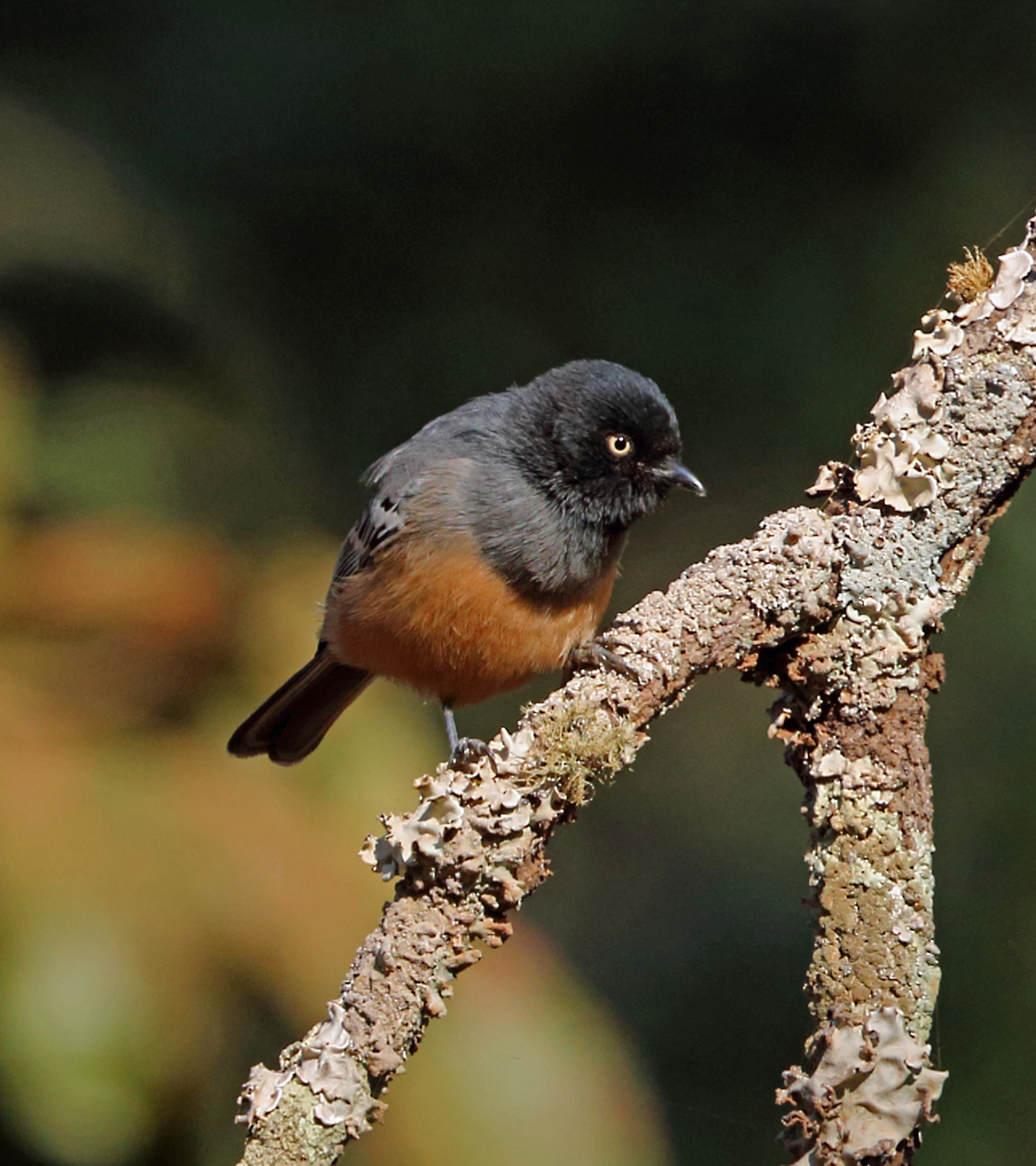

Conservation status
- Least Concern (IUCN 3.1)

Scientific classification
- Kingdom: Animalia
- Phylum: Chordata
- Class: Aves
- Order: Passeriformes
- Family: Paridae
- Genus: Melaniparus
- Species: M. rufiventris

Binomial name
- Melaniparus rufiventris (Barboza du Bocage, 1877)
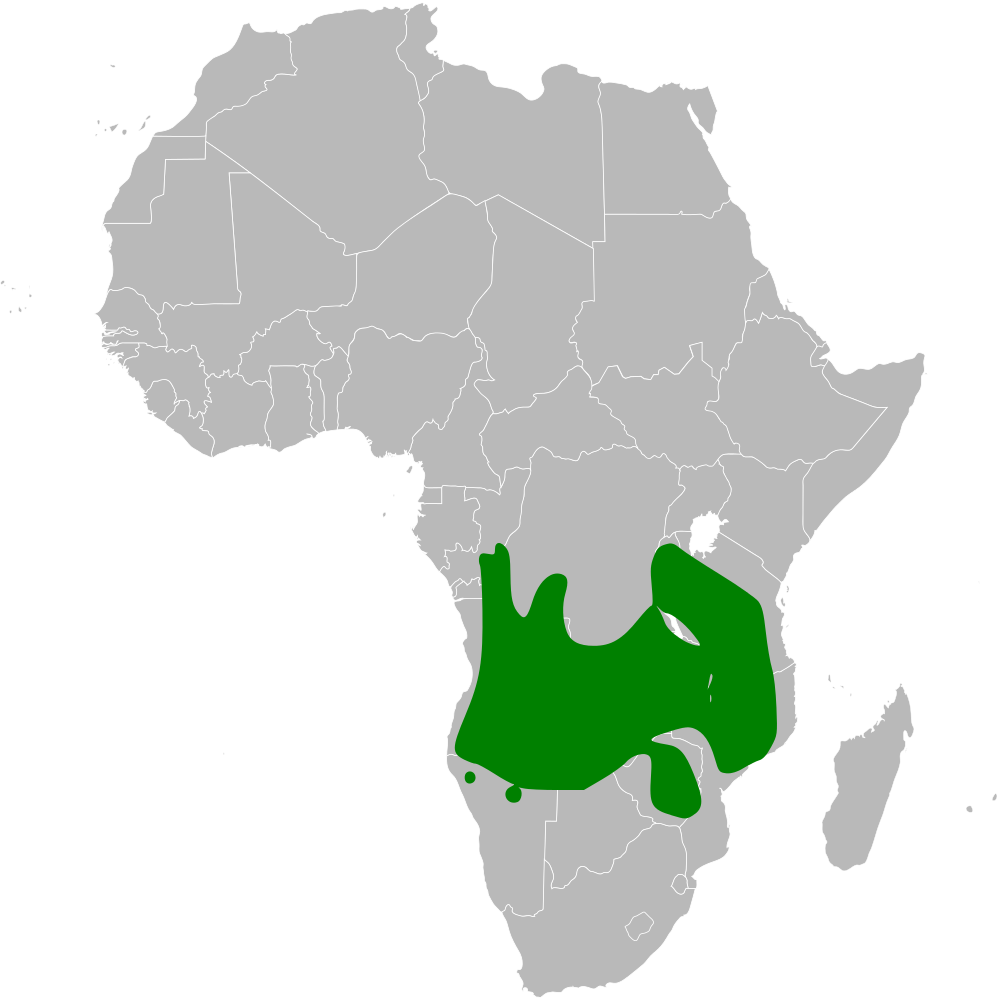
- resident range

Synonyms
- Parus rufiventris

= Rufous-bellied tit =

Species of bird

The rufous-bellied tit (Melaniparus rufiventris) is a species of bird in the tit family. It is found in Africa from the Republic of the Congo, DR Congo and northern Namibia east to Tanzania and northern Mozambique.

== Taxonomy ==
The rufous-bellied tit was formally described in 1877 by the Portuguese zoologist José Vicente Barbosa du Bocage based on a specimen collected near the town of Caconda in central Angola. He placed it with the tits in the genus Parus and coined the binomial name Parus rufiventris. The specific epithet is Modern Latin meaning "red-bellied", from Latin rufus meaning "ruddy" or "rufous" and venter, ventris meaning "belly". The rufous-bellied tit is now one of 14 tits placed in the genus Melaniparus that was introduced in 1850 by the French naturalist Charles Lucien Bonaparte.

Five subspecies are recognised:

- M. r. rufiventris (Barboza du Bocage, 1877) – south Congo and south DR Congo to central Angola and central Zambia
- M. r. masukuensis (Shelley, 1900) – southeast DR Congo, east Zambia and Malawi
- M. r. diligens (Clancey, 1979) – south Angola, north Namibia, southwest Zambia and northwest Botswana
- M. r. pallidiventris (Reichenow, 1885) – Tanzania, south Malawi and north Mozambique
- M. r. stenotopicus (Clancey, 1989) – east Zimbabwe and central west Mozambique

The subspecies M. r. pallidiventris and M. r. stenotopicus have sometimes been considered as a separate species, the cinnamon-breasted tit. It was thought that iris color was a reliable feature to differentiate the two species but a study published in 2015 found that in western Tanzania birds with dark eyes and pale eyes occurred in the same flocks. This suggests that it might be better to consider the cinnamon-breasted tit as a subspecies of the rufous-bellied tit.

== Description ==
This 15 cm (5.9 in) long bird has a black head, breast, wings and tail, grey upperparts, white fringes to the wing feathers, and rufous underparts. The adult has a yellow eye, brown in the duller juvenile.

Its habitat is subtropical or tropical dry miombo forests.
