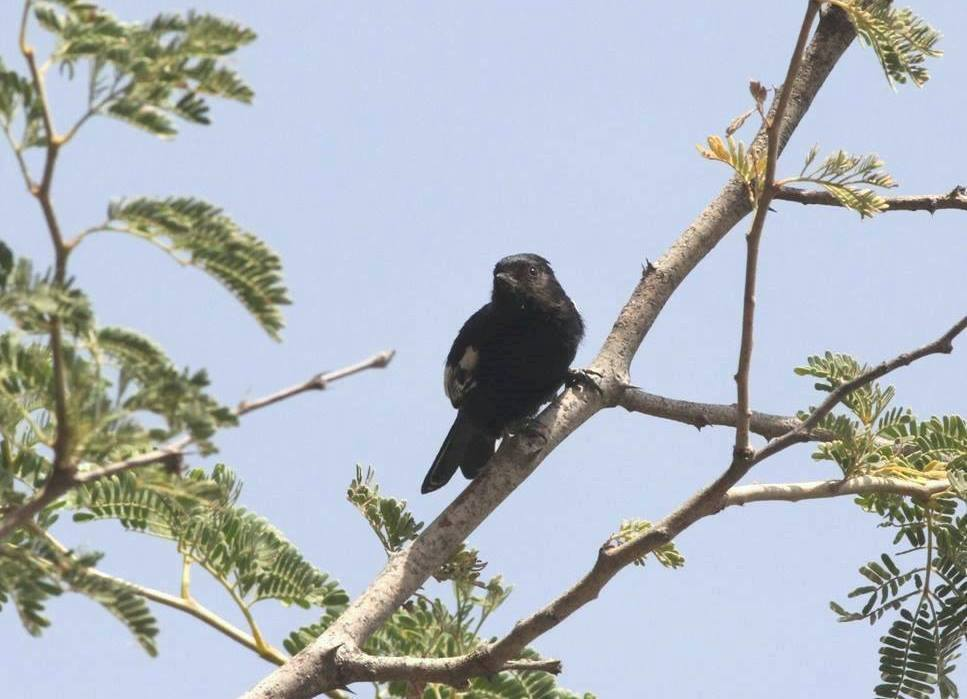

Conservation status
- Least Concern (IUCN 3.1)

Scientific classification
- Kingdom: Animalia
- Phylum: Chordata
- Class: Aves
- Order: Passeriformes
- Family: Paridae
- Genus: Melaniparus
- Species: M. carpi

Binomial name
- Melaniparus carpi (Macdonald & Hall, BP, 1957)
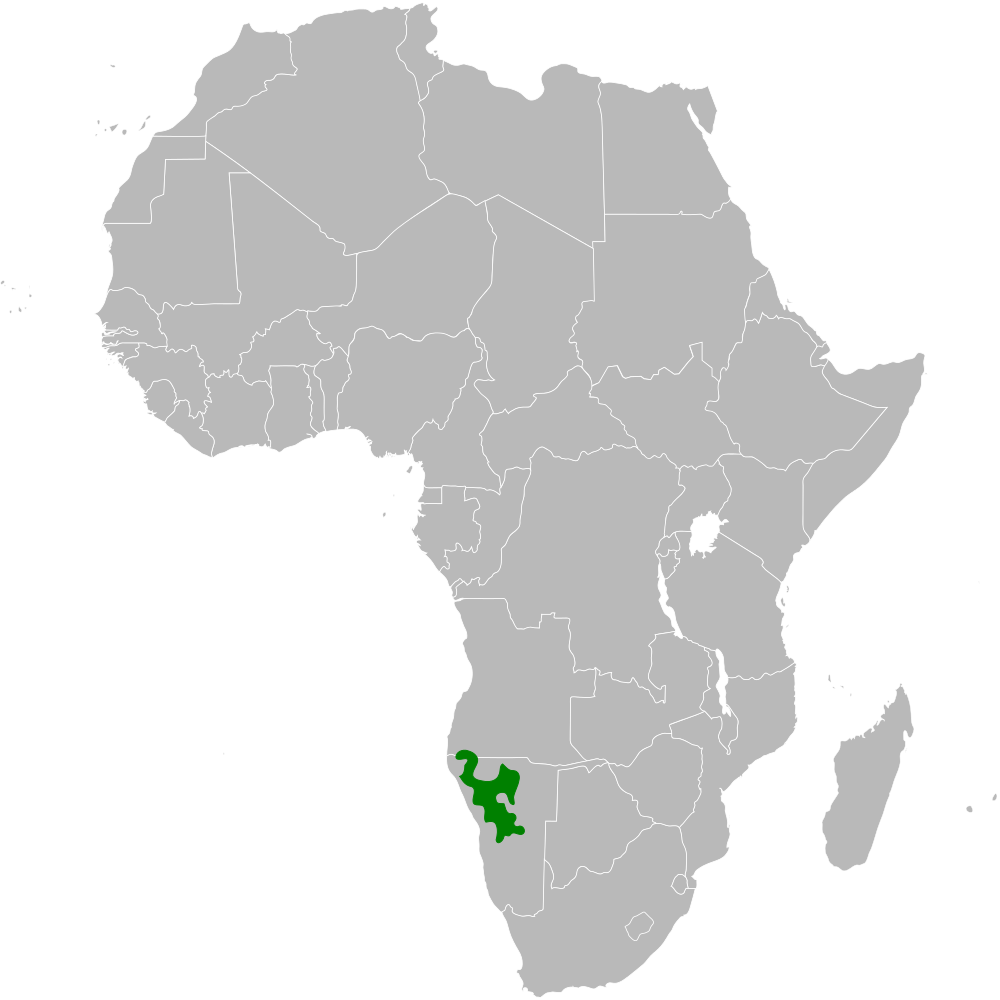

Synonyms
- Parus carpi

= Carp's tit =

Species of bird

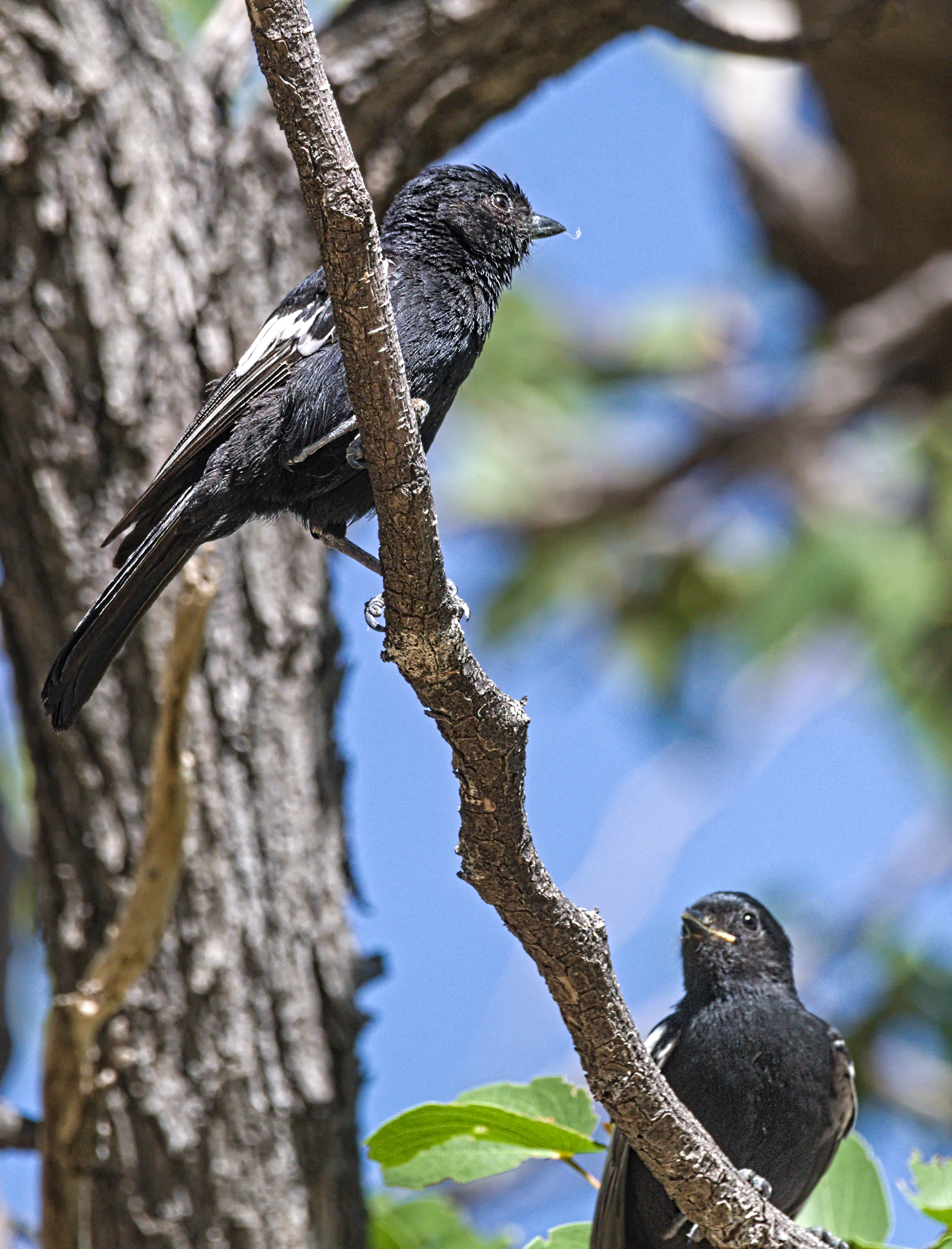
Carp's tit in Namibia

Carp's tit (Melaniparus carpi) or Carp's black tit, is a species of bird in the family Paridae. Some authors consider it a subspecies of the black tit. It is found throughout the Namibian savanna woodlands and the southern Angolan mopane woodlands.

Its name commemorates olympic sailor and ornithologist Berend Carp (1901-1966).

Carp's tit was formerly one of the many species in the genus Parus but was moved to Melaniparus after a molecular phylogenetic analysis published in 2013 showed that the members of the new genus formed a distinct clade.
