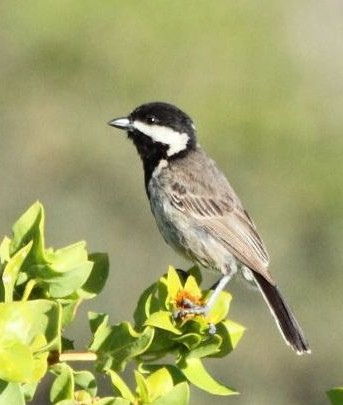
- At Namaqua National Park, Northern Cape, South Africa

Conservation status
- Least Concern (IUCN 3.1)

Scientific classification
- Kingdom: Animalia
- Phylum: Chordata
- Class: Aves
- Order: Passeriformes
- Family: Paridae
- Genus: Melaniparus
- Species: M. afer

Binomial name
- Melaniparus afer (Gmelin, JF, 1789)
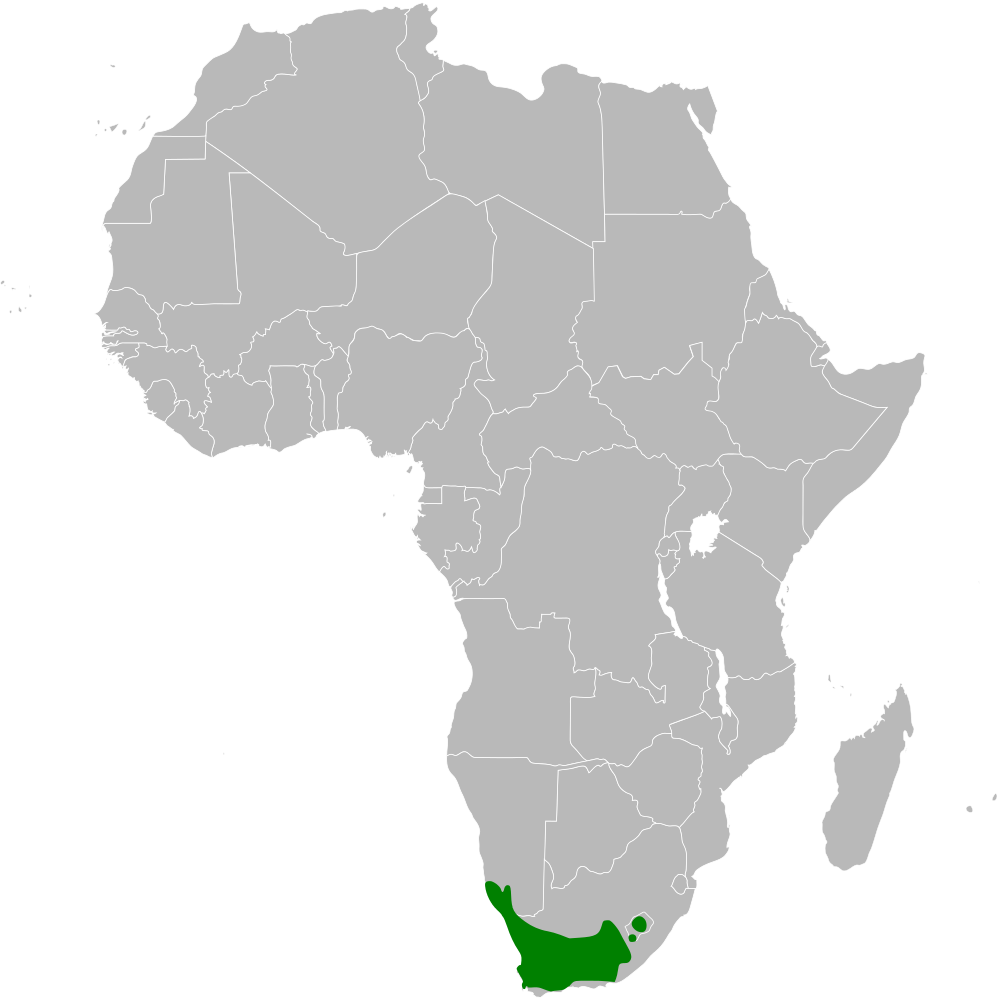
- resident range

Synonyms
- Parus afer

= Grey tit =

Species of bird

The grey tit (Melaniparus afer) is a species of bird in the tit family Paridae. It is found in Lesotho and South Africa. Its natural habitats are subtropical or tropical dry shrubland and Mediterranean-type shrubby vegetation.

== Taxonomy ==
The grey tit was formally described in 1789 by the German naturalist Johann Friedrich Gmelin in his revised and expanded edition of Carl Linnaeus's Systema Naturae. He placed it with the tits in the genus Parus and coined the binomial name Parus afer. Gmelin based his account on the "black-breasted titmouse" that had been described in 1783 by the English ornithologist John Latham in his book A General Synopsis of Birds. Latham had examined a specimen from the Cape of Good Hope that formed part of the collection of the naturalist Joseph Banks. The grey tit was moved to the genus Melaniparus based on the results of a molecular phylogenetic study published in 2013 that found that a group of species formed a distinct clade. The genus Melaniparus had been introduced in 1850 by the French naturalist Charles Lucien Bonaparte. The genus name combines the Ancient Greek melas, melanos "black" and the genus Parus introduced by Carl Linnaeus in 1758. The specific epithet afer is Latin meaning "African".

Two subspecies are recognised:

- M. a. arens (Clancey, 1963) – south South Africa and Lesotho
- M. a. afer (Gmelin, JF, 1789) – Namibia and west South Africa
