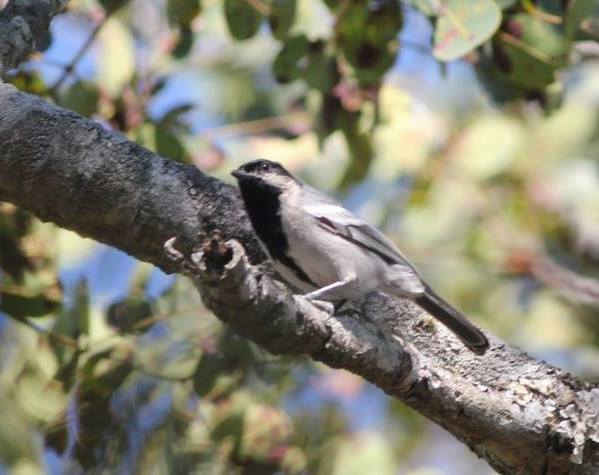

Conservation status
- Least Concern (IUCN 3.1)

Scientific classification
- Kingdom: Animalia
- Phylum: Chordata
- Class: Aves
- Order: Passeriformes
- Family: Paridae
- Genus: Melaniparus
- Species: M. griseiventris

Binomial name
- Melaniparus griseiventris (Reichenow, 1882)
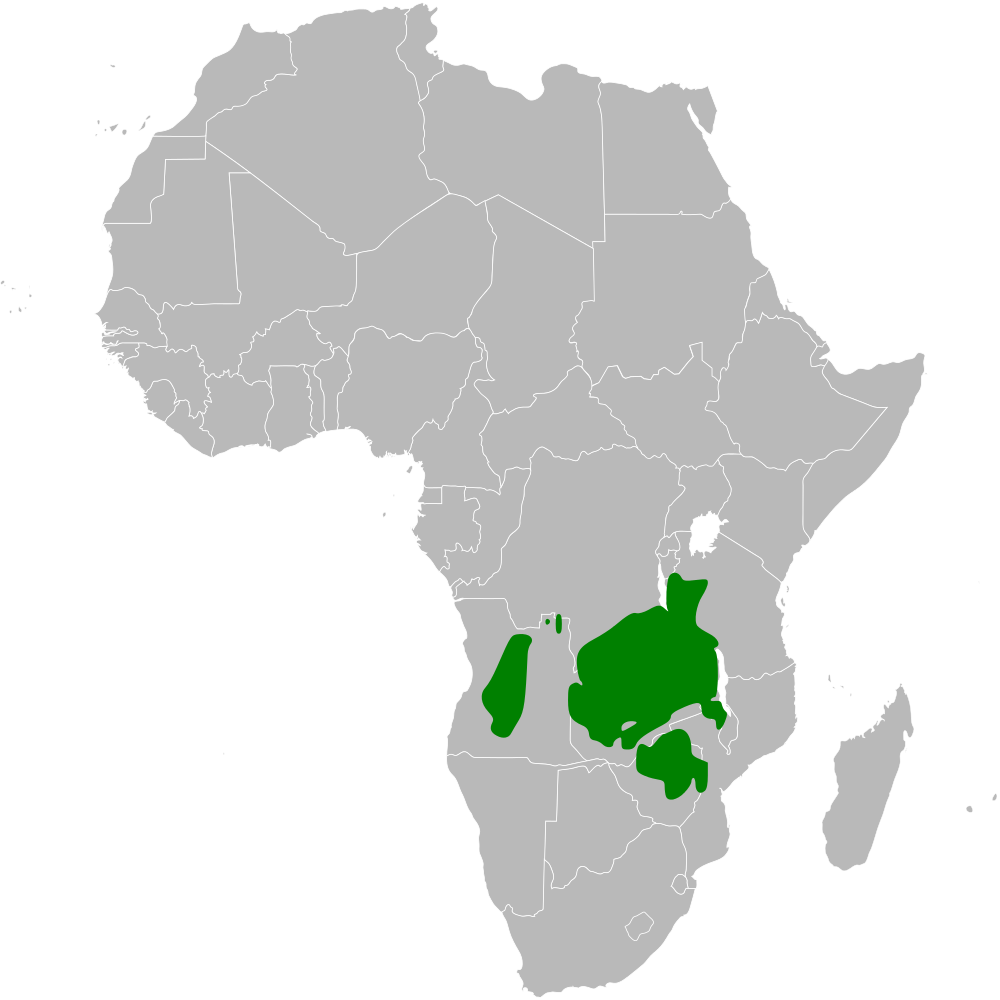
- resident range

Synonyms
- Parus griseiventris

= Miombo tit =

Species of bird

The miombo tit (Melaniparus griseiventris) is a species of bird in the family Paridae. It is found in Angola, DR Congo, Malawi, Mozambique, Tanzania, Zambia, and Zimbabwe. Its natural habitat is subtropical or tropical dry forests.

The miombo tit was formerly one of many species in the genus Parus but was moved to Melaniparus after a molecular phylogenetic analysis published in 2013 showed that the members of the new genus formed a distinct clade.
