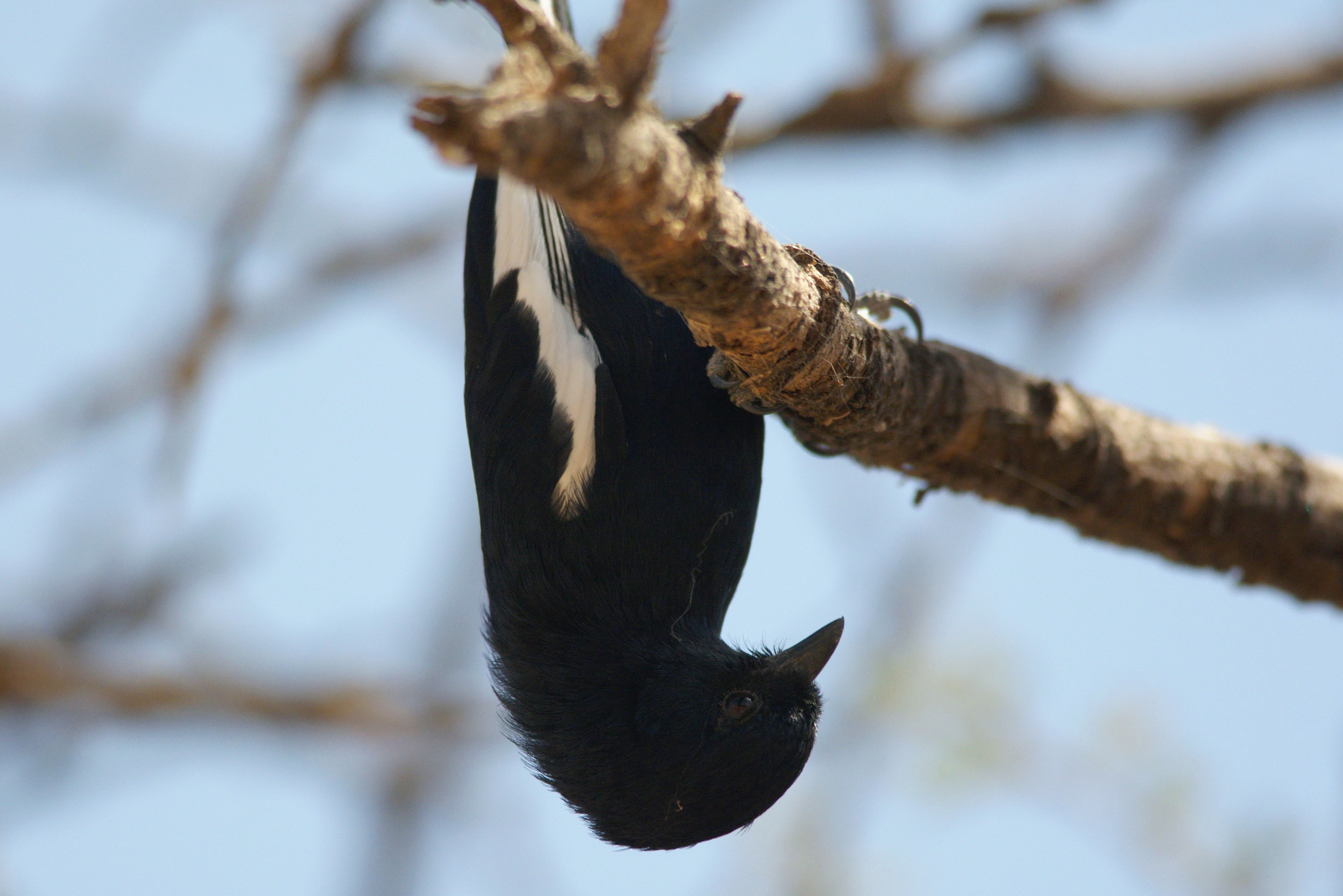
- Nominate race in Ethiopia
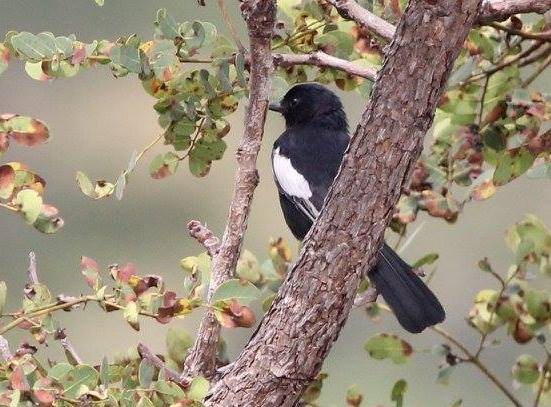
- M. l. insignis in Angola

Conservation status
- Least Concern (IUCN 3.1)

Scientific classification
- Kingdom: Animalia
- Phylum: Chordata
- Class: Aves
- Order: Passeriformes
- Family: Paridae
- Genus: Melaniparus
- Species: M. leucomelas

Binomial name
- Melaniparus leucomelas (Rüppell, 1840)
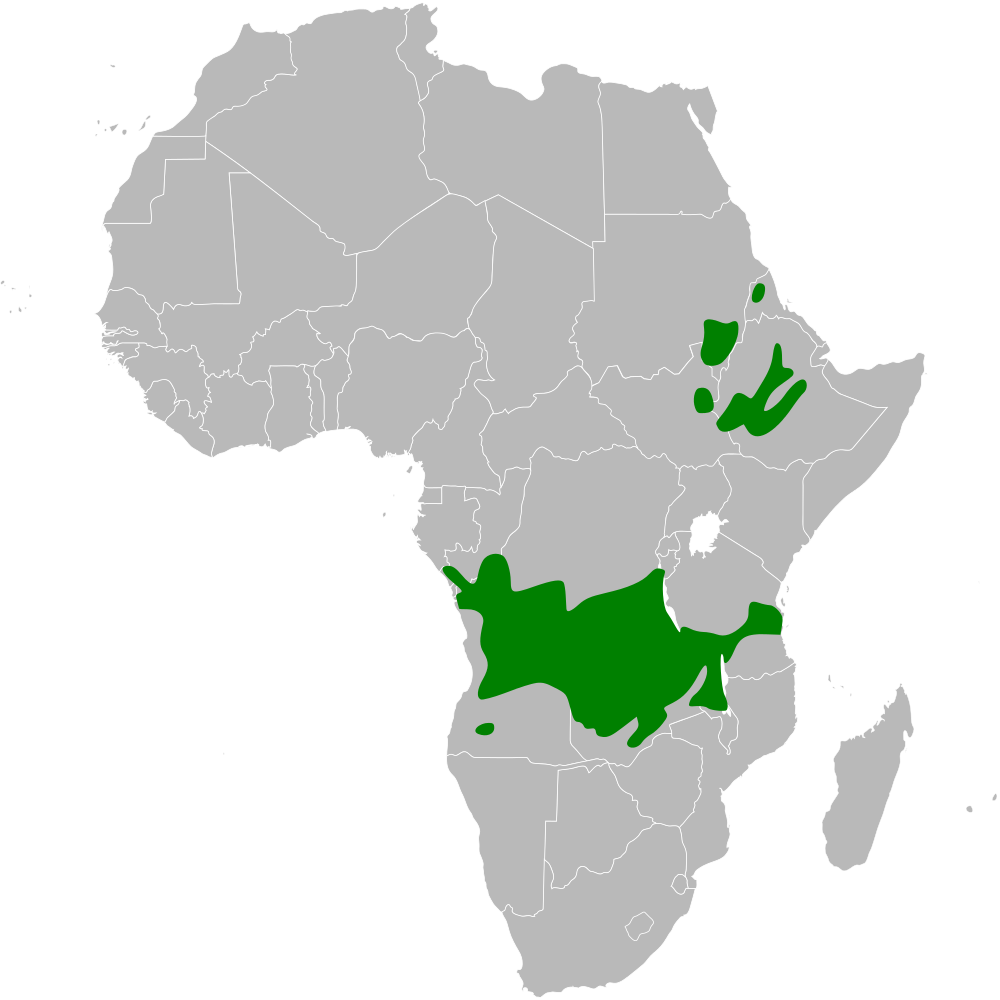
- Map showing ranges of two races, respectively north and south of equator

Synonyms
- Parus leucomelas

= White-winged black tit =

Species of bird

The white-winged black tit (Melaniparus leucomelas) is a passerine bird in the tit family Paridae. It is also known as the white-winged tit, dark-eyed black tit or northern black tit. The species was first described by Eduard Rüppell in 1840.

== Description ==
It is mainly black with a white wing patch, but differs from the more northern white-shouldered tit (Melaniparus guineensis) with which it sometimes considered conspecific in that it has a dark eye.

== Range and races ==
It is found in central Africa, from Angola in the west to Ethiopia in the east. There are two races:

- M. l. leucomelas Rüppell, 1840 – Ethiopia, Eritrea, Sudan and South Sudan
- M. l. insignis Cabanis, 1880 – African equator to southern subtropics

== Taxonomy ==
The white-winged black tit was formerly one of the many species in the genus Parus but was moved to Melaniparus after a molecular phylogenetic analysis published in 2013 showed that the members of the new genus formed a distinct clade.
