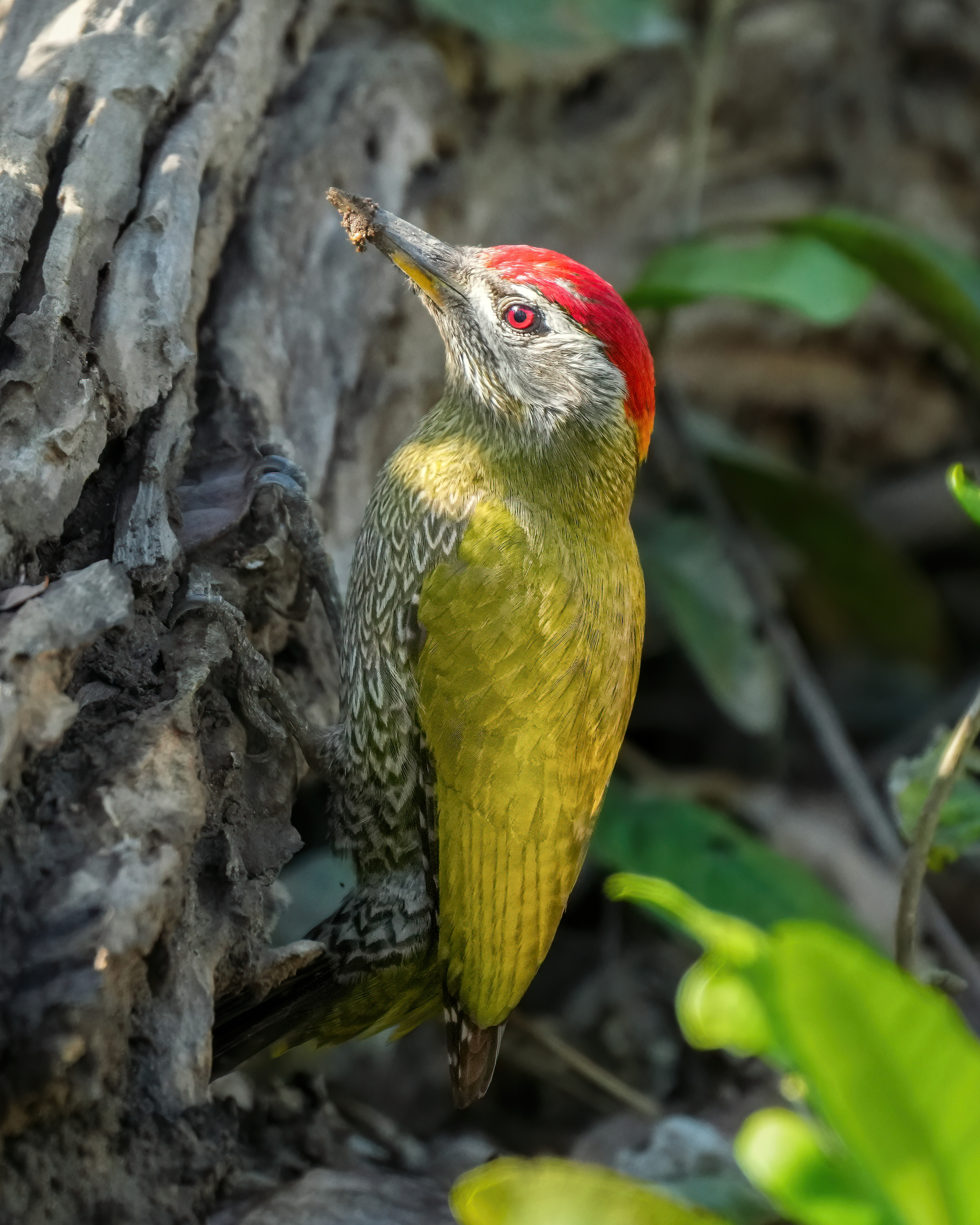
- Male bird in Jim Corbett National Park and a sound recording from Tamil Nadu, India

Conservation status
- Least Concern (IUCN 3.1)

Scientific classification
- Kingdom: Animalia
- Phylum: Chordata
- Class: Aves
- Order: Piciformes
- Family: Picidae
- Genus: Picus
- Species: P. xanthopygaeus

Binomial name
- Picus xanthopygaeus (Gray, JE & Gray, GR, 1847)

Synonyms
- Picus myrmecophoneus

= Streak-throated woodpecker =

Species of bird

The streak-throated woodpecker (Picus xanthopygaeus) is a species of woodpecker found in the Indian subcontinent. It occurs in drier woodland, from lowland to the foothills of mountains.

== Description ==
A medium-sized, green woodpecker with streaked throat and scaly whitish underparts. Green above with yellowish rump, white supercilia and white and black moustache. Crown red in male, blackish in female. Tail dark and plain. Smallish, dark bill.

== Similar species ==
The streak-breasted woodpecker has pale eyes, denser underpart streaking, and a thinner pale moustache stripe. The laced woodpecker has less underpart streaking and a warm yellowish hue all over the neck. The scaly-bellied woodpecker has streaked belly feathers, but unstreaked breast and throat plumage.

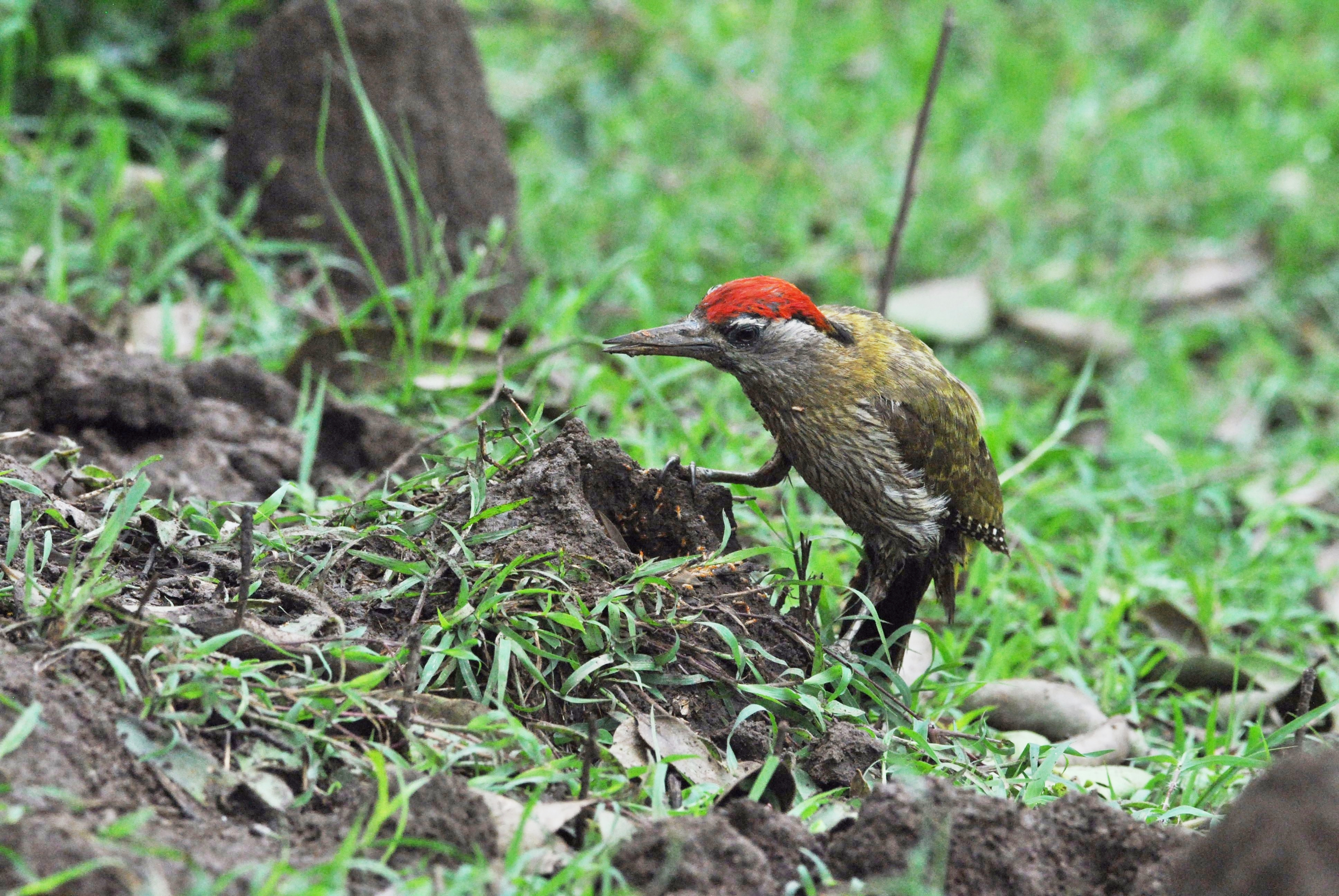
male feeding on termites at Nagarhole National Park in Karnataka

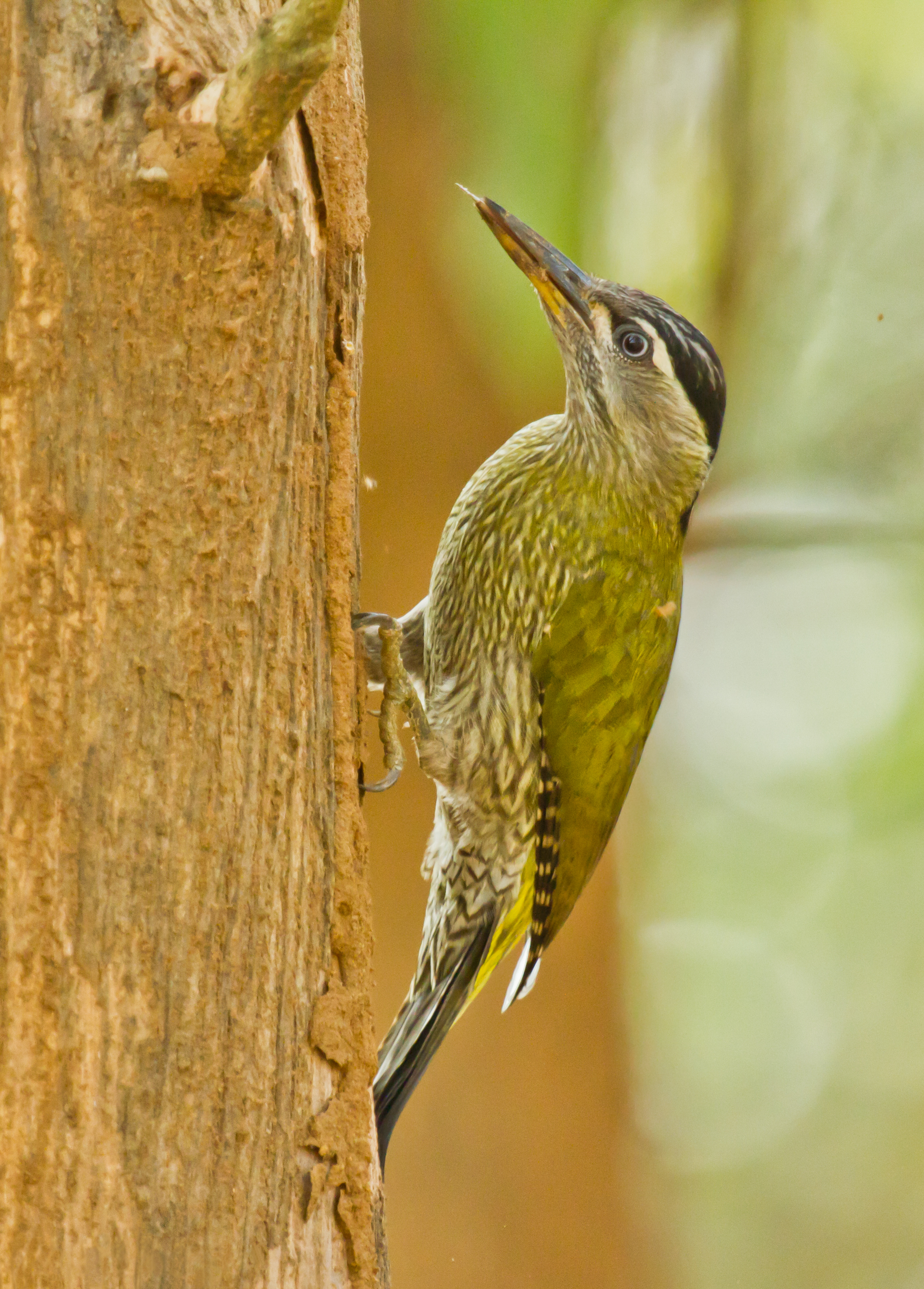
female at Nilambur in Kerala

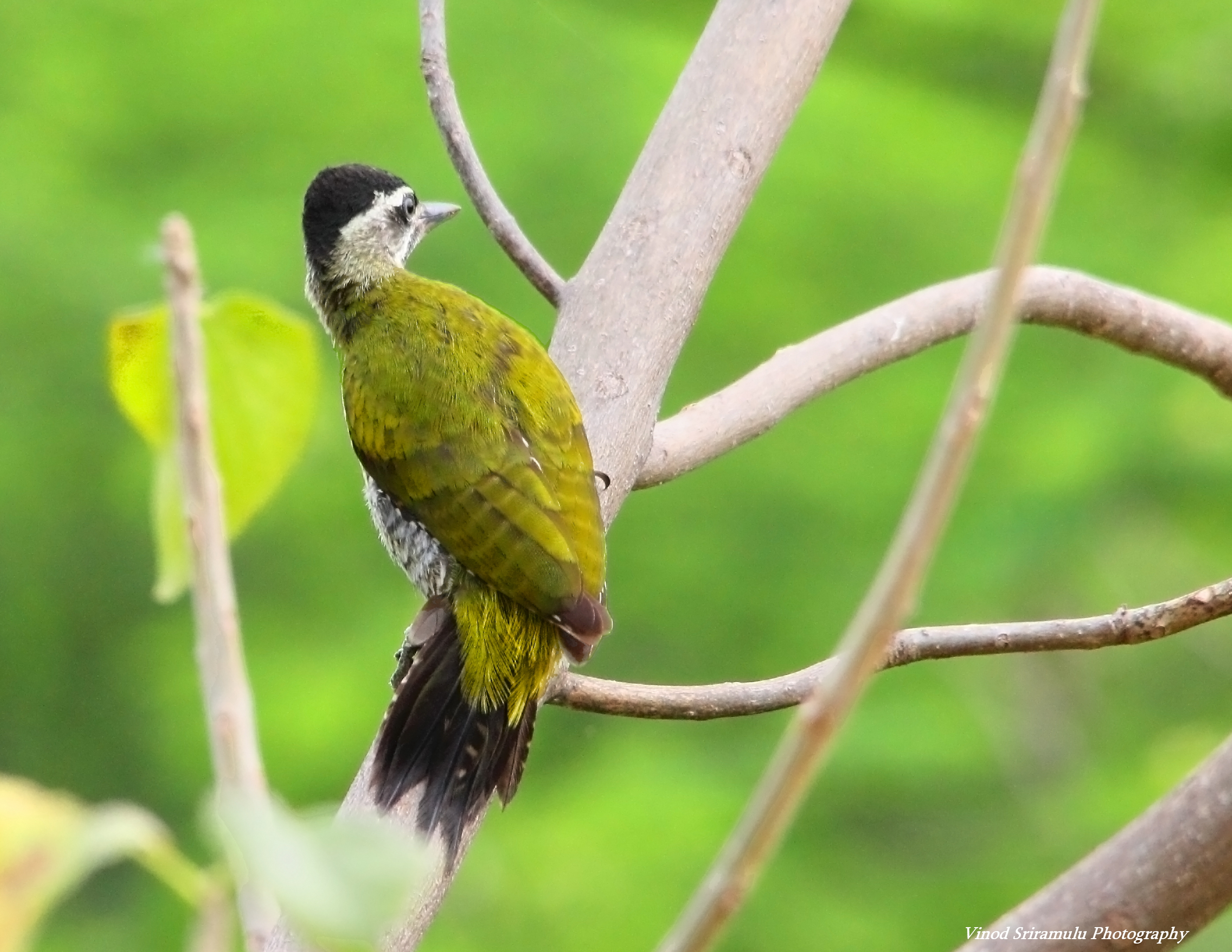
dorsal view of a female in western Tamil Nadu

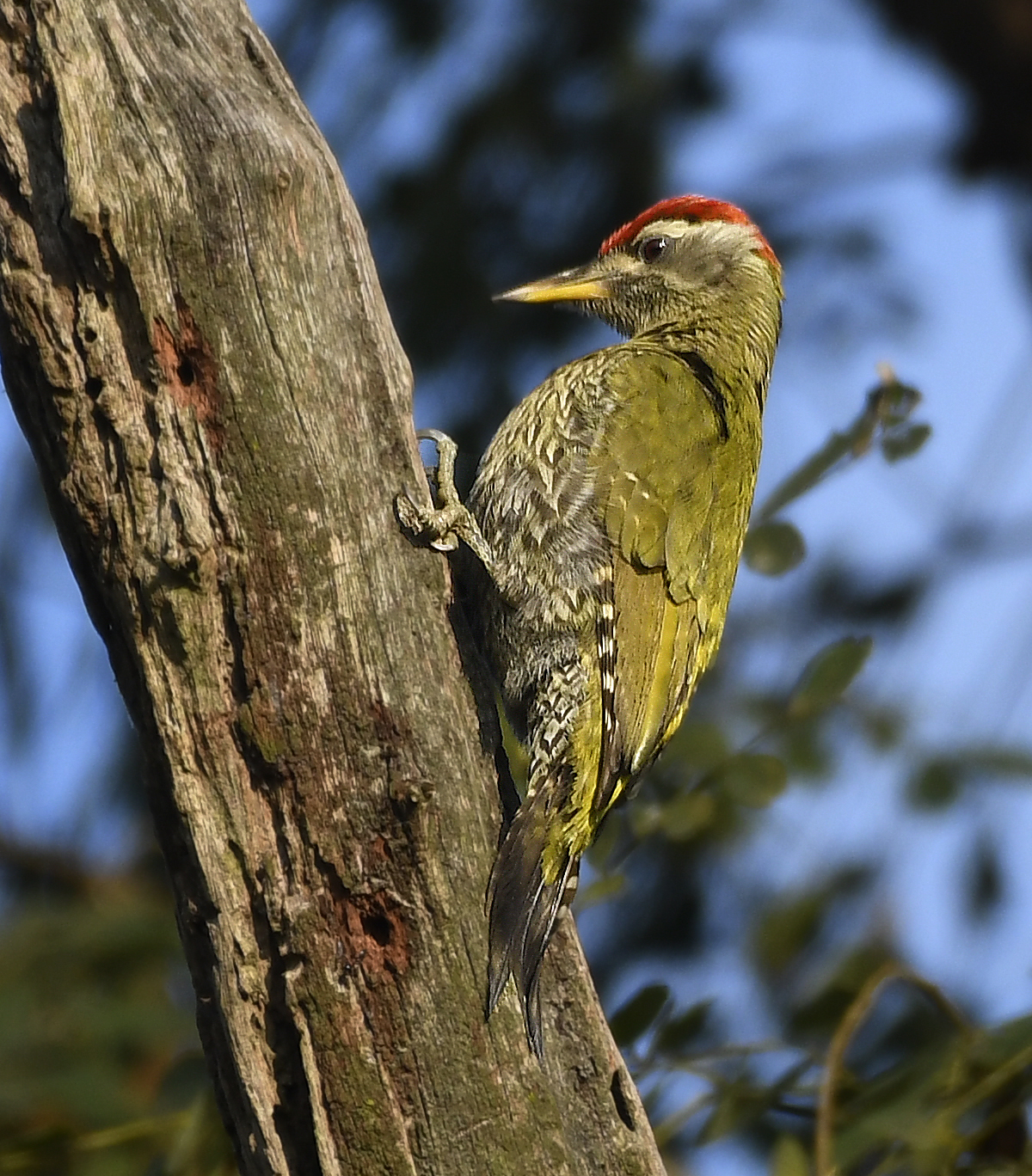
male at Kaziranga National Park in Assam
