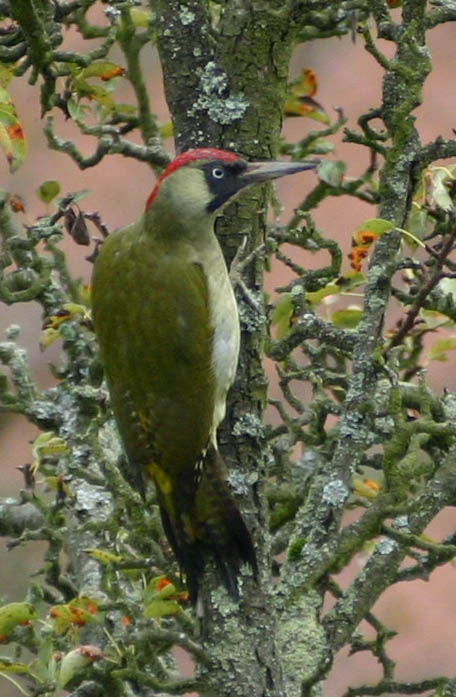
- Female Eurasian green woodpecker (P. viridis)

Scientific classification
- Kingdom: Animalia
- Phylum: Chordata
- Class: Aves
- Order: Piciformes
- Family: Picidae
- Tribe: Picini
- Genus: Picus; Linnaeus, 1758

Type species
- Picus viridis Linnaeus, 1758

Species
- see list

Synonyms
- Gecinus

= Picus (bird) =

Genus of birds

Picus is a genus of birds in the woodpecker family. It has representatives in Europe, Asia and North Africa. The genus name is Latin for "woodpecker". The genus Picus was erected by the Swedish naturalist Carl Linnaeus in 1758 in the tenth edition of his Systema Naturae.

These are large woodpeckers, typically with green upperparts. They are found in forests or more open woodland, and lay their white eggs in a tree hole nest, typically on a bed of wood chips. Picus woodpeckers are primarily insect eaters, with several species specialising in taking ants or termites. Some species will also consume fruit or eggs. Insects are captured by a rapid outward flick of the long tongue and gummed to its tip by sticky saliva. This genus is less completely arboreal than some other woodpecker groups, and its members often feed on the ground, attacking anthills or termitaries.

== Taxonomy ==
The genus Picus was introduced in 1758 by the Swedish naturalist Carl Linnaeus in the tenth edition of his Systema Naturae. The genus name is the Latin word for a woodpecker. Picus was a figure in Roman mythology, the first king of Latium who was changed into a woodpecker by the sorceress Circe. Of the 13 species in the genus listed by Linnaeus, the English naturalist William Swainson designated the European green woodpecker (Picus viridis) as the type species.

The genus contains 13 species:

Image	Common name	Scientific name	Distribution
	Lesser yellownape	Picus chlorolophus	India, Bhutan, Nepal, Bangladesh and Sri Lanka eastwards to Thailand, Burma, Cambodia, Laos, Indonesia, Malaysia and Vietnam.
	Crimson-winged woodpecker	Picus puniceus	Brunei, Indonesia, Malaysia, Myanmar, Singapore, and Thailand.
	Streak-breasted woodpecker	Picus viridanus	southeastern Bangladesh to central Malay Peninsula.
	Laced woodpecker	Picus vittatus	Cambodia, China, Indonesia, Laos, Malaysia, Myanmar, Singapore, Thailand and Vietnam.
	Streak-throated woodpecker	Picus xanthopygaeus	Indian Subcontinent and Southeast Asia
	Scaly-bellied woodpecker	Picus squamatus	Afghanistan, Iran, India, Nepal, Pakistan, and Turkmenistan.
	Japanese green woodpecker	Picus awokera	Japan.
	Eurasian green woodpecker	Picus viridis	Europe south from southern Yugoslavia, Bulgaria, Asia Minor, northern Iran and south-west Turkmenistan.
	Iberian green woodpecker	Picus sharpei	Iberian Peninsula, as well as southern France
	Levaillant's woodpecker	Picus vaillantii	Morocco, Algeria and Tunisia in northwest Africa
	Red-collared woodpecker	Picus rabieri	Cambodia, China, Laos, and Vietnam.
	Black-headed woodpecker	Picus erythropygius	Cambodia, Laos, Myanmar, Thailand, and Vietnam.
	Grey-headed woodpecker	Picus canus	Central, Northern and Eastern Europe, as well as a wide belt south of the boreal coniferous forests across Asia all the way to the Pacific coast, Sakhalin and Hokkaidō

== Former species ==
The following were formerly included in Picus, but are now placed in Chrysophlegma.

- Greater yellownape, Chrysophlegma flavinucha
- Checker-throated woodpecker, Chrysophlegma mentalis
- Banded woodpecker, Chrysophlegma miniaceus

An extinct woodpecker has been described from a fossil of a left tarsometatarsus dating from late Miocene. It may belong to this genus and has been given the binomial name Picus peregrinabundus.
