= Burmese prinia =

Scientific classification
- Kingdom: Animalia
- Phylum: Chordata
- Class: Aves
- Order: Passeriformes
- Family: Cisticolidae
- Genus: Prinia
- Species: P. cooki

Binomial name
- Prinia cooki (Harington, 1913)

Species of bird

The Burmese prinia (Prinia cooki) is a species of bird in the family Cisticolidae. It and the Annam prinia (P. rocki) were formerly lumped with Deignan's prinia (P. polychroa) as the brown prinia.

It is found in Southeast Asia, where it is distributed from central Myanmar west to the western edge of Thailand and Laos, and north to the southern Yunnan Province in China. It is monotypic and has no known subspecies. It was split from P. rocki and P. polychroa following a phylogenetic study published in 2019.
