= Picus peregrinabundus =

Picus peregrinabundus Temporal range: Late Miocene, 11.6–5.3 Ma

Scientific classification
- Kingdom: Animalia
- Phylum: Chordata
- Class: Aves
- Order: Piciformes
- Family: Picidae
- Genus: Picus
- Species: P. peregrinabundus

Binomial name
- Picus peregrinabundus Umanskaja, 1981

Extinct woodpecker species

Picus peregrinabundus is a species of woodpecker from the late Miocene first described by Soviet scientist Umanskaja in 1981. It lived in what is now Ukraine. The species relationships have been called into question and need to be rechecked. The species is only known from a left tarsometatarsus.

== Paleoecology ==
Picus peregrinabundus lived with the loon species Gavia paradoxa and the falcon Falco medius, all in the Odesa region of Ukraine near the city of Myhai. During its time Europe was covered by forests.
