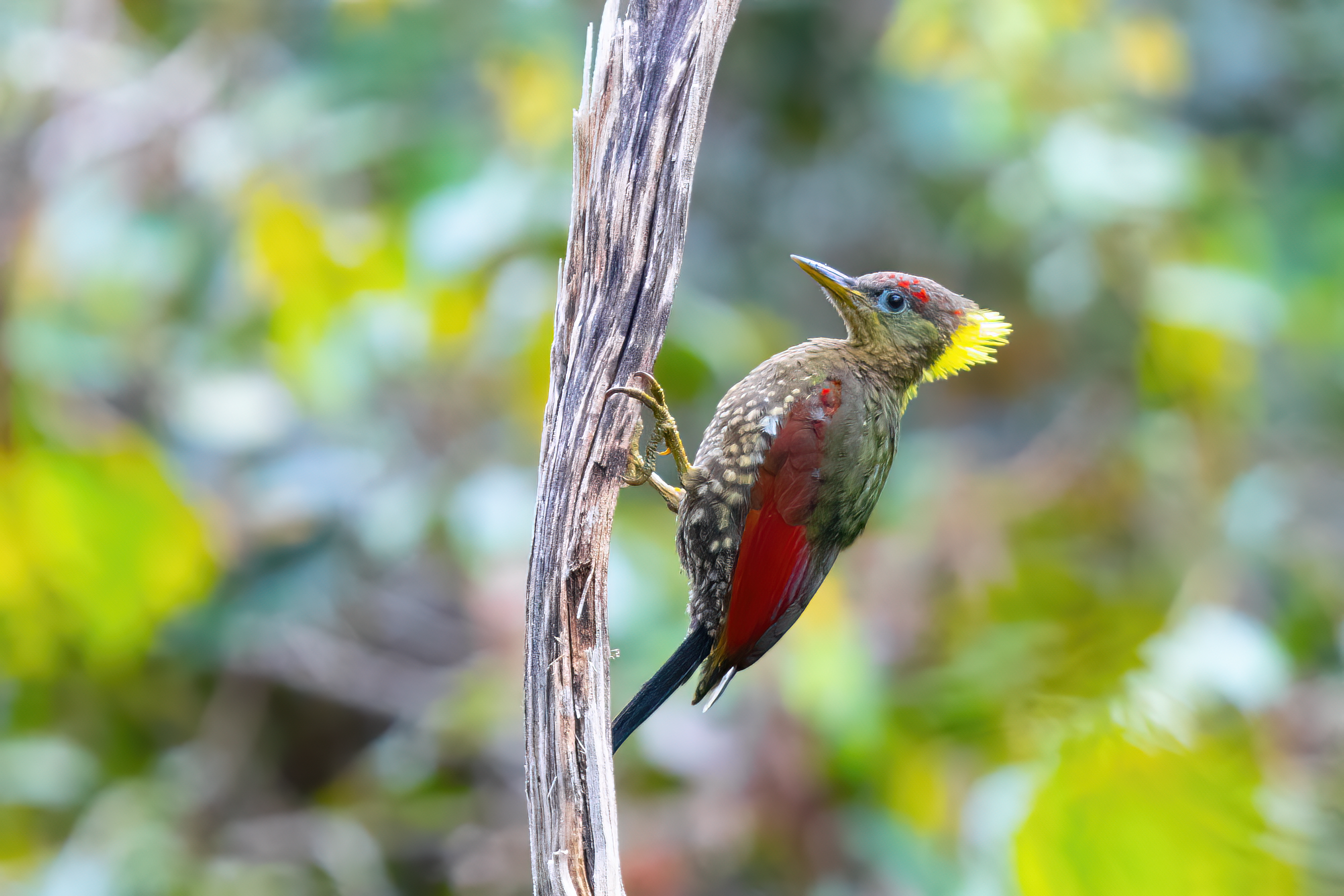

Conservation status
- Least Concern (IUCN 3.1)

Scientific classification
- Kingdom: Animalia
- Phylum: Chordata
- Class: Aves
- Order: Piciformes
- Family: Picidae
- Genus: Picus
- Species: P. puniceus

Binomial name
- Picus puniceus Horsfield, 1821

= Crimson-winged woodpecker =

Species of bird

The crimson-winged woodpecker (Picus puniceus) is a species of bird in the woodpecker family. It is found in Brunei, Indonesia, Malaysia, Myanmar, Singapore, and Thailand. Its natural habitat is subtropical or tropical moist lowland forests. It can grow up to 25 cm long. Its diet is mainly insects and larvae. It is a bright and colourful bird that is hard to misidentify.
