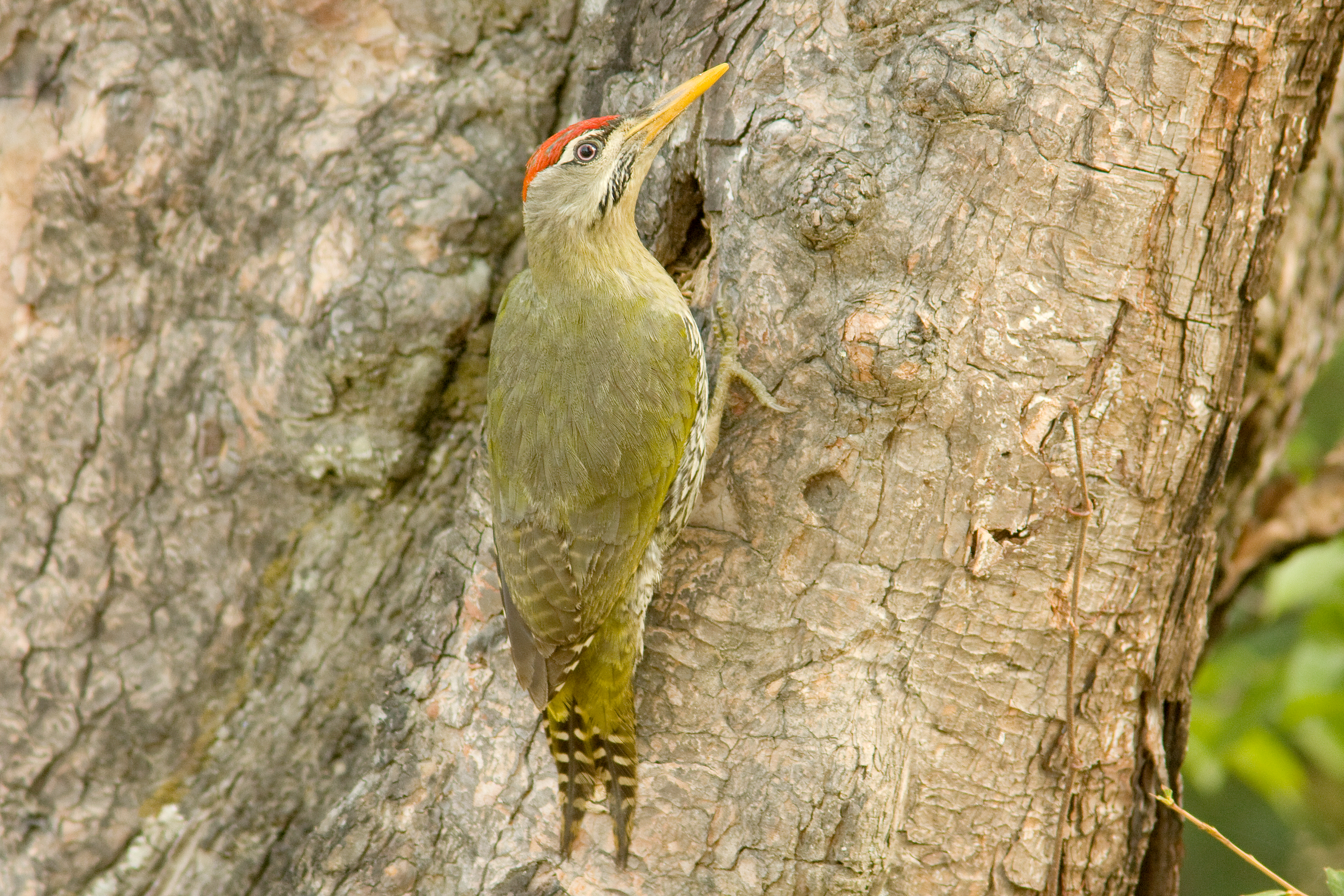
- in Nainital district of Uttarakhand, India.

Conservation status
- Least Concern (IUCN 3.1)

Scientific classification
- Kingdom: Animalia
- Phylum: Chordata
- Class: Aves
- Order: Piciformes
- Family: Picidae
- Genus: Picus
- Species: P. squamatus

Binomial name
- Picus squamatus Vigors, 1831

= Scaly-bellied woodpecker =

Species of bird

The scaly-bellied woodpecker (Picus squamatus) is a species of bird in the family Picidae. It is found in the Indian subcontinent and adjoining regions, ranging across Afghanistan, Iran, India, Nepal, Pakistan, and Turkmenistan.

== Habitat ==
Its natural habitats are boreal forests, temperate forests, and subtropical or tropical moist lowland forests.

== Description ==
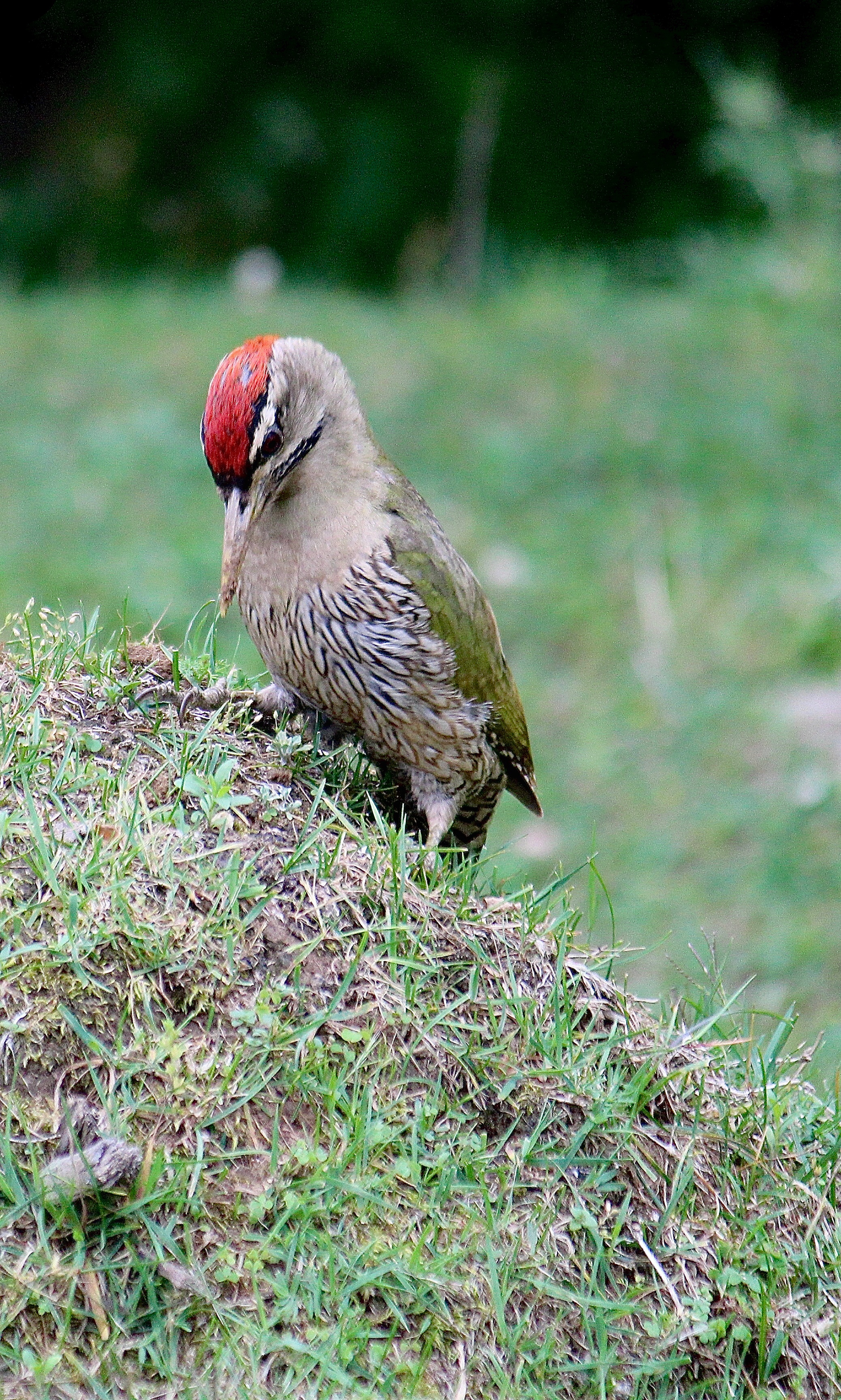
Adult male foraging for termites in Kasmir

Large, green woodpecker with distinct scaling from breast to vent. Similar to streak-throated woodpecker but larger and with unstreaked throat and upper breast. Black moustache and black bored white supercilia. Tail strongly barred. Crown red in male, blackish in female. Large pale bill.
