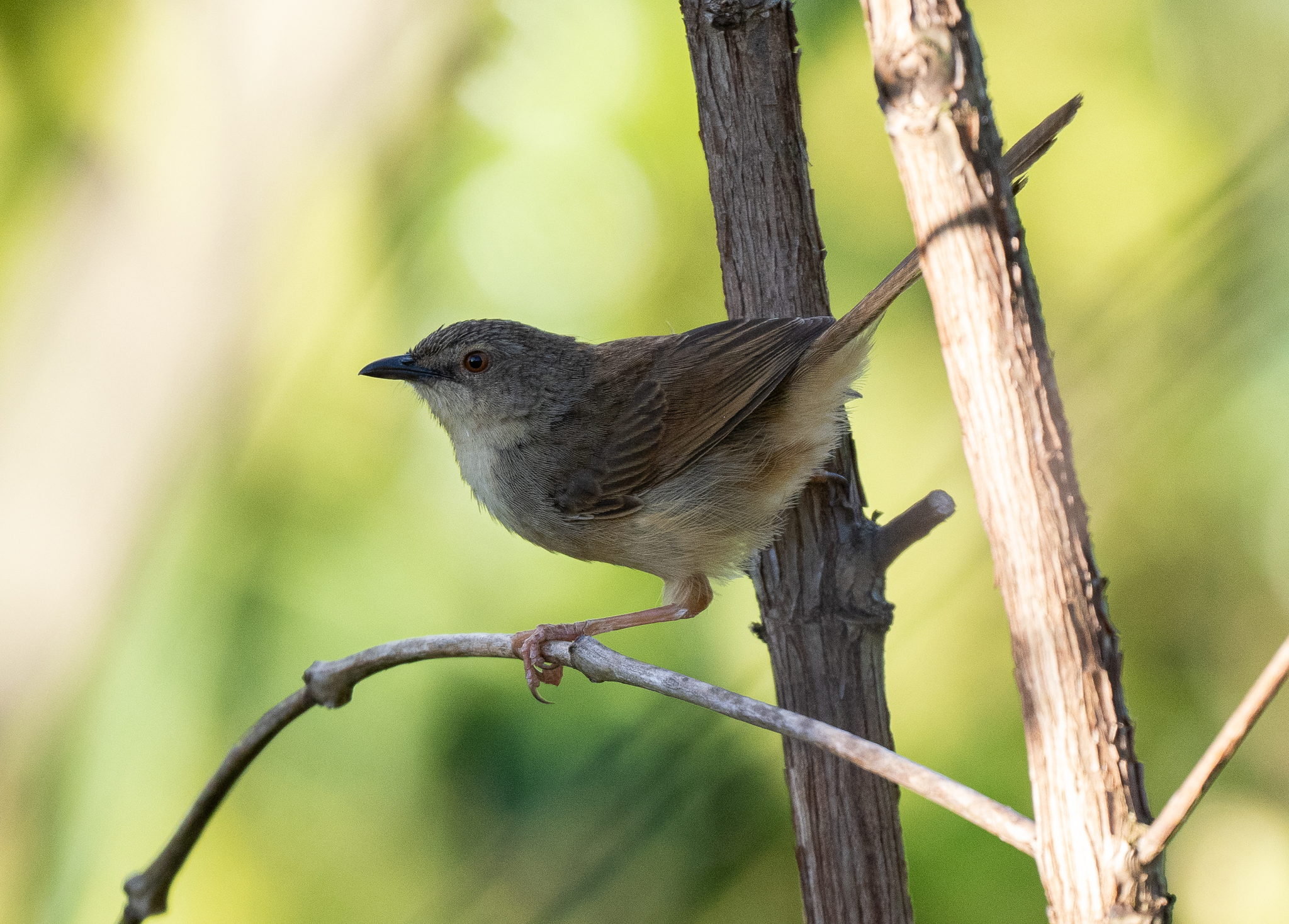

Scientific classification
- Kingdom: Animalia
- Phylum: Chordata
- Class: Aves
- Order: Passeriformes
- Family: Cisticolidae
- Genus: Prinia
- Species: P. rocki

Binomial name
- Prinia rocki Deignan, 1957

= Annam prinia =

Species of bird

The Annam prinia (Prinia rocki) is a species of bird in the family Cisticolidae. It and the Burmese prinia (P. cooki) were formerly lumped with Deignan's prinia (P. polychroa) as the brown prinia.

It is found in the Đà Lạt Plateau of the Annamite Mountains in a small portion of southern Vietnam and eastern Cambodia. It is monotypic and has no known subspecies. It was split from P. cooki and P. polychroa following a phylogenetic study published in 2019.
