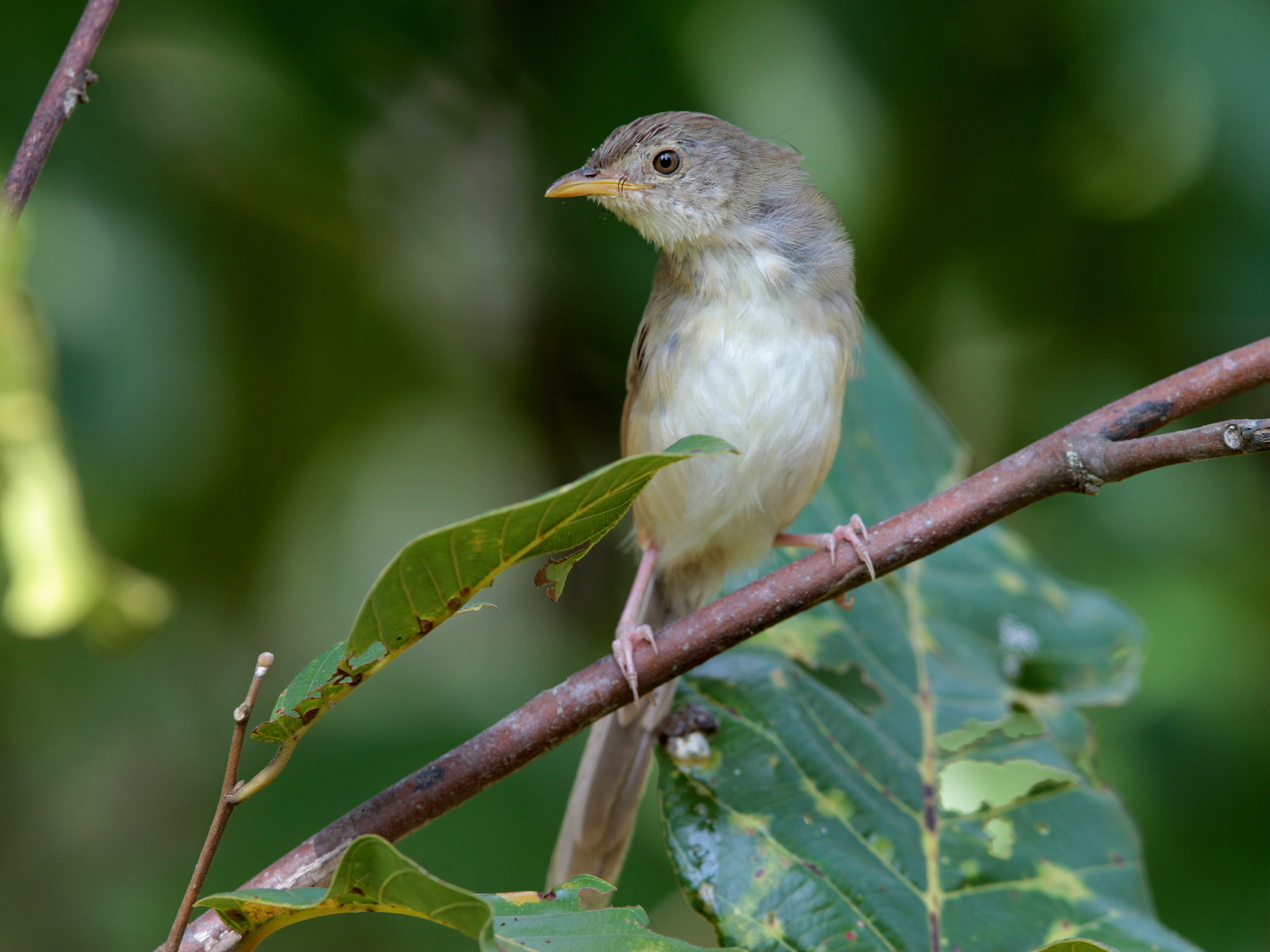

Conservation status
- Least Concern (IUCN 3.1)

Scientific classification
- Kingdom: Animalia
- Phylum: Chordata
- Class: Aves
- Order: Passeriformes
- Family: Cisticolidae
- Genus: Prinia
- Species: P. polychroa

Binomial name
- Prinia polychroa (Temminck, 1828)

= Brown prinia =

Species of bird

The brown prinia (Prinia polychroa) is a species of bird in the family Cisticolidae. The Burmese prinia (P. cooki) and the Annam prinia (P. rocki) were formerly lumped with this species.

It is found in mainland Southeast Asia, namely in most of Thailand, Laos, Vietnam, and Cambodia, as well as on the Indonesian island of Java. Its natural habitat is subtropical or tropical dry forest. Populations in Myanmar, far western Thailand, far western Laos, and southern China are now considered to belong to P. cooki, while populations in the Đà Lạt Plateau of Vietnam and far eastern Cambodia are now considered to belong P. rocki.

There are two recognised subspecies: P. p. deignani, which is found in Thailand, Laos, Vietnam and Cambodia, and P. p. polychroa, which is restricted to Java. P. p. deignani was formerly considered an eastern population of P. p. cooki (when it was considered a subspecies) until the 2019 study, which split the Burmese and south Chinese populations as P. cooki while reclassifying the Thai, Laotian, and Cambodian populations into a new subspecies, P. p. deignani. P. crinigera bangsi, now considered a subspecies of the Himalayan prinia (P. crinigera), was also formerly considered another south Chinese subspecies of P. polychroa (P. p. bangsi) until the 2019 study.

It was named after the American ornithologist Herbert Girton Deignan.
