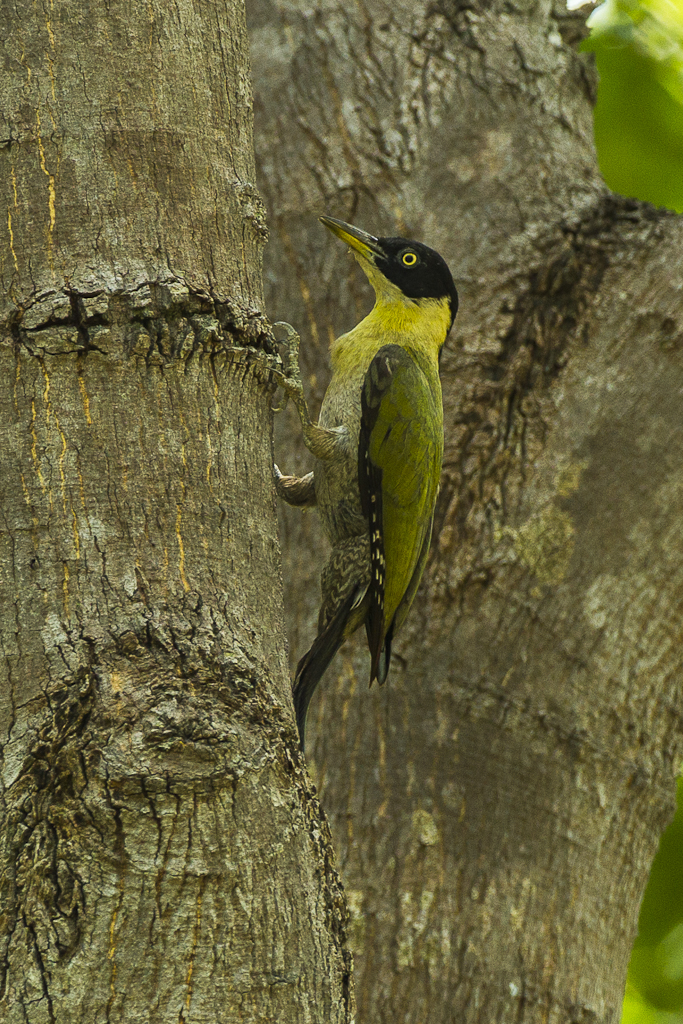
- Female
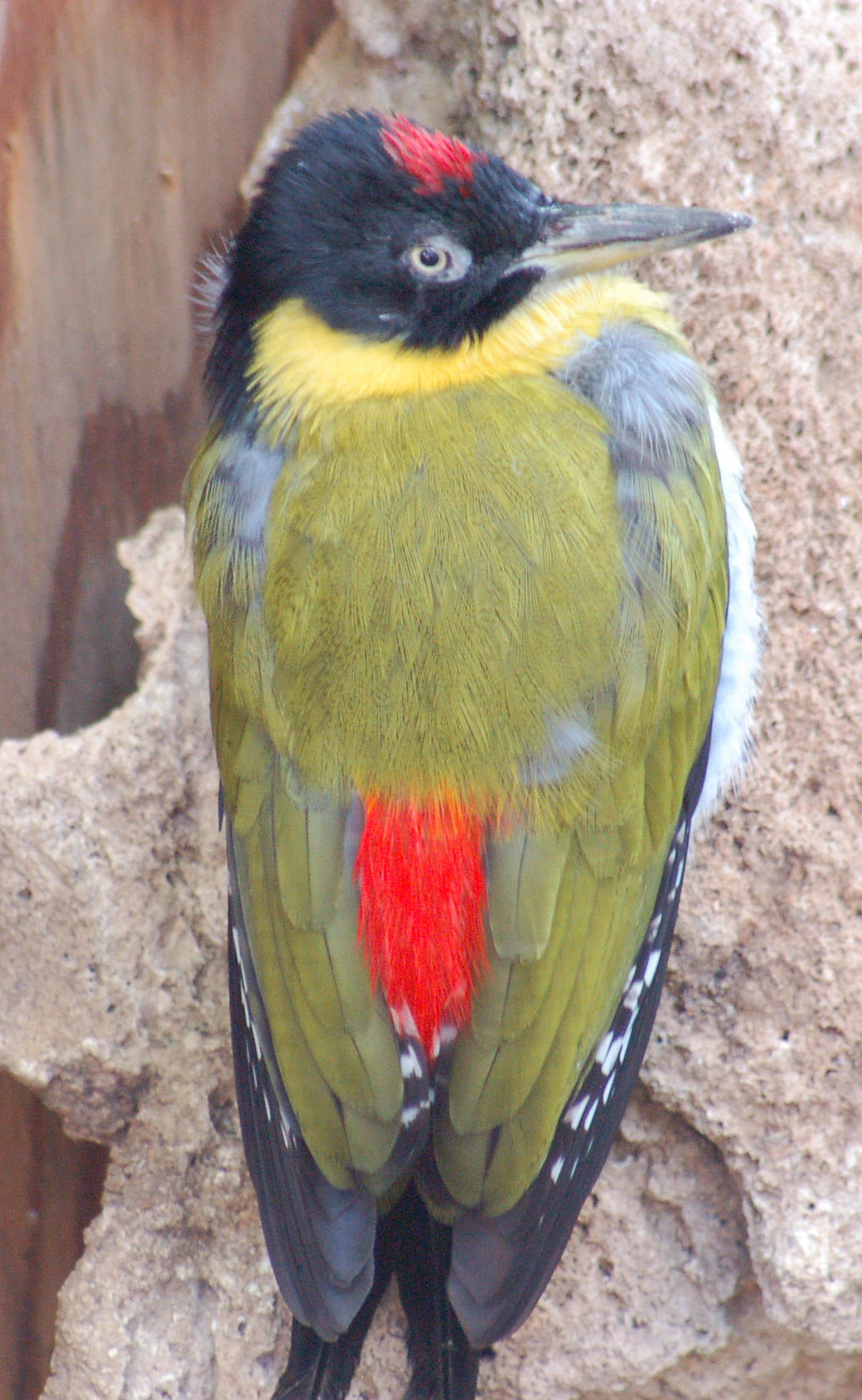
- Male

Conservation status
- Least Concern (IUCN 3.1)

Scientific classification
- Kingdom: Animalia
- Phylum: Chordata
- Class: Aves
- Order: Piciformes
- Family: Picidae
- Genus: Picus
- Species: P. erythropygius

Binomial name
- Picus erythropygius (Elliot, 1865)

= Black-headed woodpecker =

Species of bird

The black-headed woodpecker (Picus erythropygius) is a species of bird in the family Picidae. It typically inhabits deciduous and coniferous forests and is found in Cambodia, Laos, Myanmar, Thailand, and Vietnam.

== Description ==
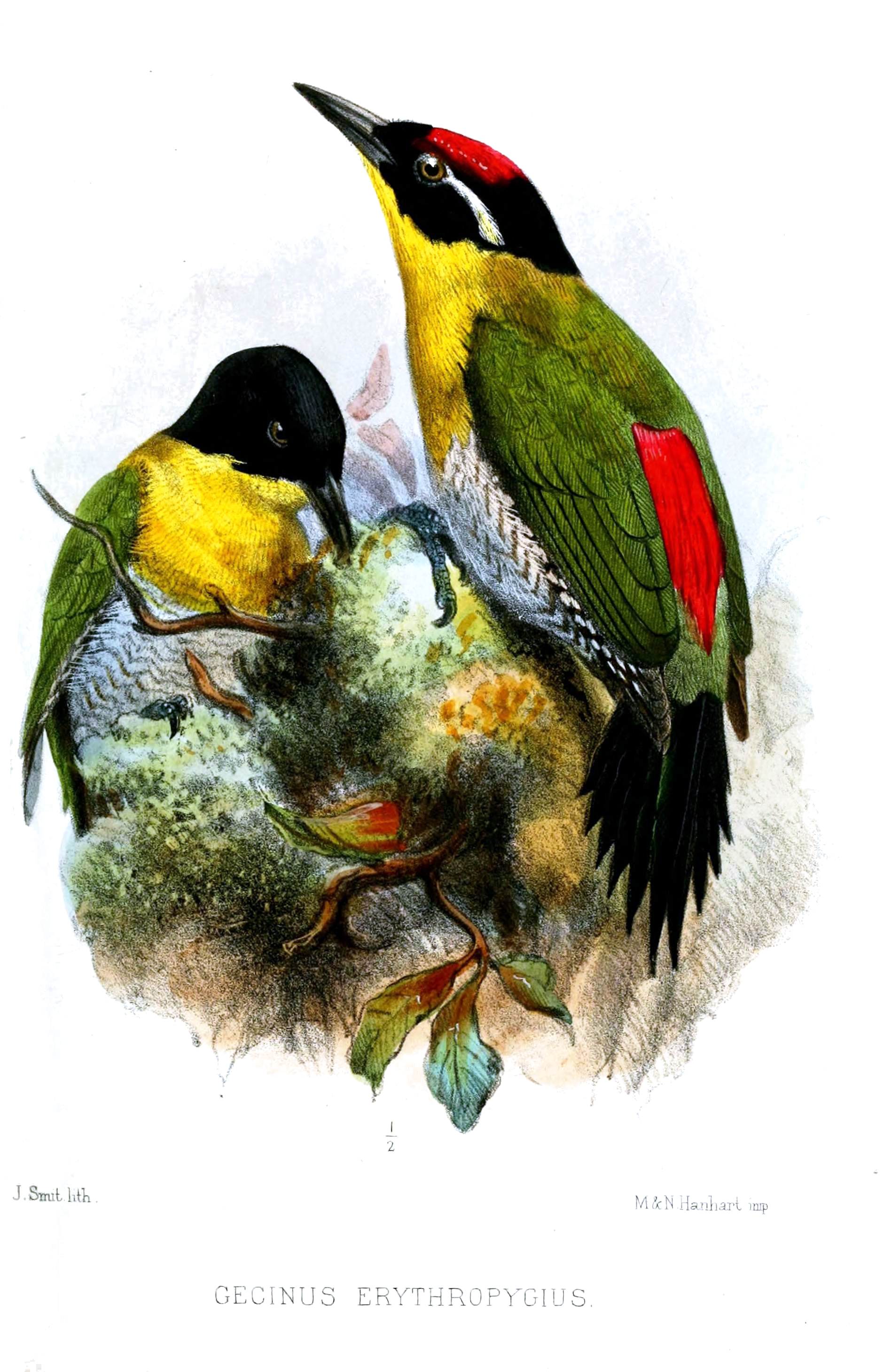
Female and male black-headed woodpeckers

The black-headed woodpecker is a medium-sized bird at around 33 cm tall and 100-135g. Adult birds have very distinct plumage and have a black face, yellow throat, green wings, a red lower back, and a white stomach. They also have white/yellow eyes and some individuals have a thin white line from their eye to their neck. Males have a red crown, while females have a completely black crown with no red. Juveniles are less pigmented than adults and juvenile males have fewer red crown feathers on their heads.

== Taxonomy ==
The black-headed woodpecker is a member of the woodpecker family Picidae and the genus Picus. They have been considered to be most closely related to the European green woodpecker (P. viridis) and the grey-headed woodpecker (P. canus). However, recent studies have challenged this original phylogenetic relationship.

=== Subspecies ===
There are two recognized subspecies of the black-headed woodpecker:

- Picus erythropygius nigrigenis (Hume, 1874) – Myanmar and Northwest-West Thailand. This subspecies is more commonly found and can be identified by its black bill.
- Picus erythropygius erythropygius (Elliot, 1865) – Northeast Thailand and Indochina. This subspecies has a white bill, as opposed to a black one.

== Distribution and habitat ==
Black-headed woodpeckers are found in Cambodia, Laos, Myanmar, Thailand, and Vietnam. They are most commonly found in the mid-story and sub-canopy of deciduous and coniferous forests. They usually prefer dry dipterocarp forests, semi-evergreen forests, riverine forests, and savanna forests. They are also resident birds.

== Behaviour and ecology ==
=== Diet ===
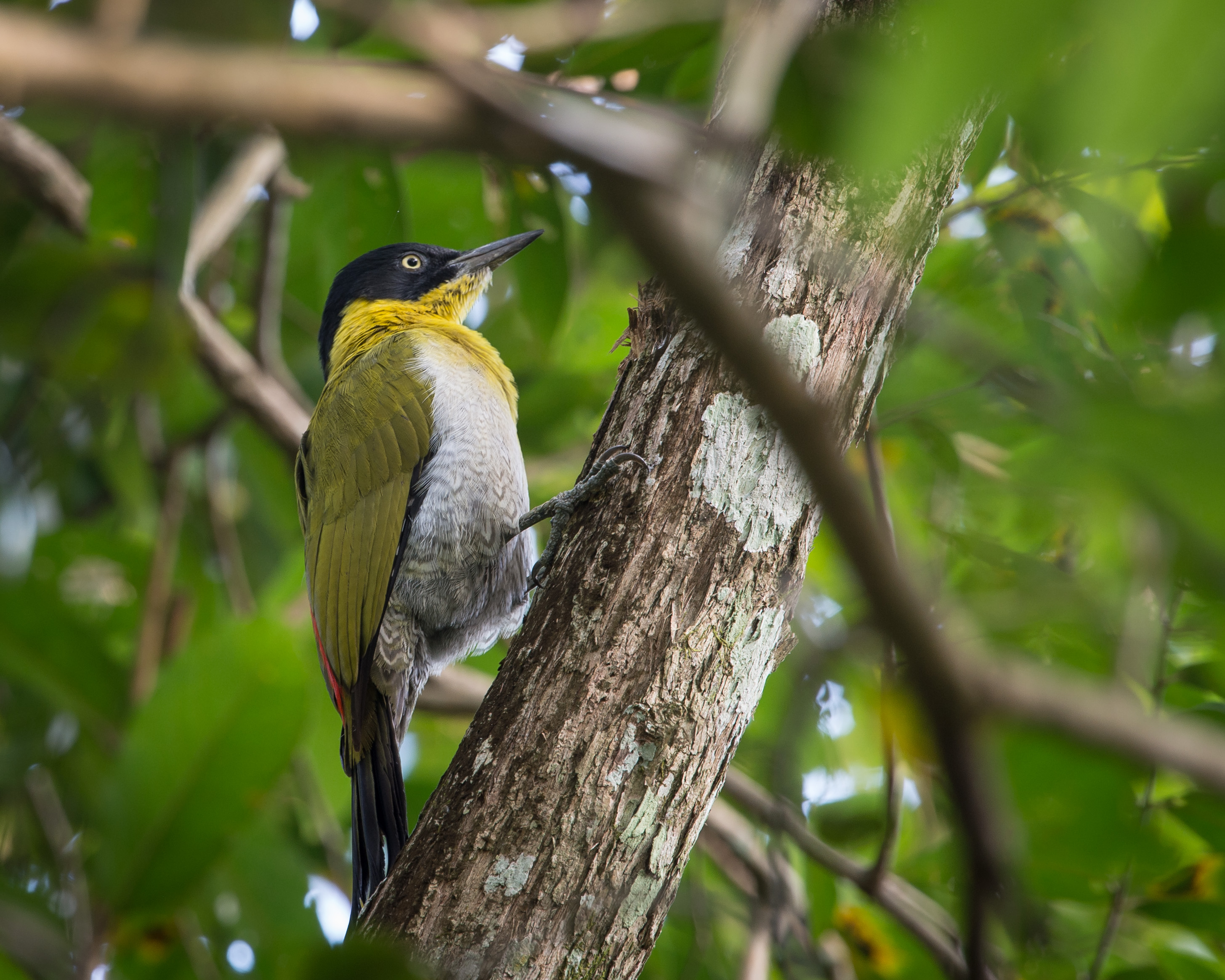
Black-headed woodpecker on a tree

Black-headed woodpeckers, like most woodpeckers, are insectivorous and glean insects on the bark of trees. They most commonly consume termites, but they also eat ants and other insects and invertebrates.

=== Vocalization ===
Their song is a loud series of yelps that sound similar to laughing. These yelps ("ka-tek-a-tek-a-tek-a-tek" or "cha-cha-cha, cha-cha-cha") are rapidly repeated and the first note is emphasized.

=== Reproduction ===
Little is known about their reproduction, but they reproduce between February–June and nest within trees. They also have around 3-4 eggs. In a wildlife sanctuary in Chiang Mai, their nests were occupied in May.

=== Flocks ===
Black-headed woodpeckers are usually found in groups with other bird species. These bird waves consist of larger flock sizes, which allow birds to worry less about predators and spend more time foraging. Black-headed woodpeckers are typically found in flocks with white-crested laughingthrushes (Garrulax leucolophus), lesser necklaced laughingthrushes (Garrulax monileger), and greater racket-tailed drongos (Dicrurus paradiseus). In these flocks, black-headed woodpeckers, along with the other birds, produce alarm calls when predators approach.

=== Parasites ===
The black-headed woodpecker is vulnerable to many parasites, including avian haemoproteid parasite, Haemoproteus bennetti, which has been detected in its blood. They are also susceptible to Picidae-specific parasites, including chewing lice, Picicola roberti, and quill mites, Picobia heeri, which inhabit the feather quills.

== Status and Conservation ==
The black-headed woodpecker is currently classified as least concern, but populations are decreasing. This is mostly due to habitat destruction caused by human settlements and agricultural fields.

In 2003, the black-headed woodpecker was declared a protected wildlife species by the Thai government. The species is also found in many wildlife sanctuaries across Thailand.
