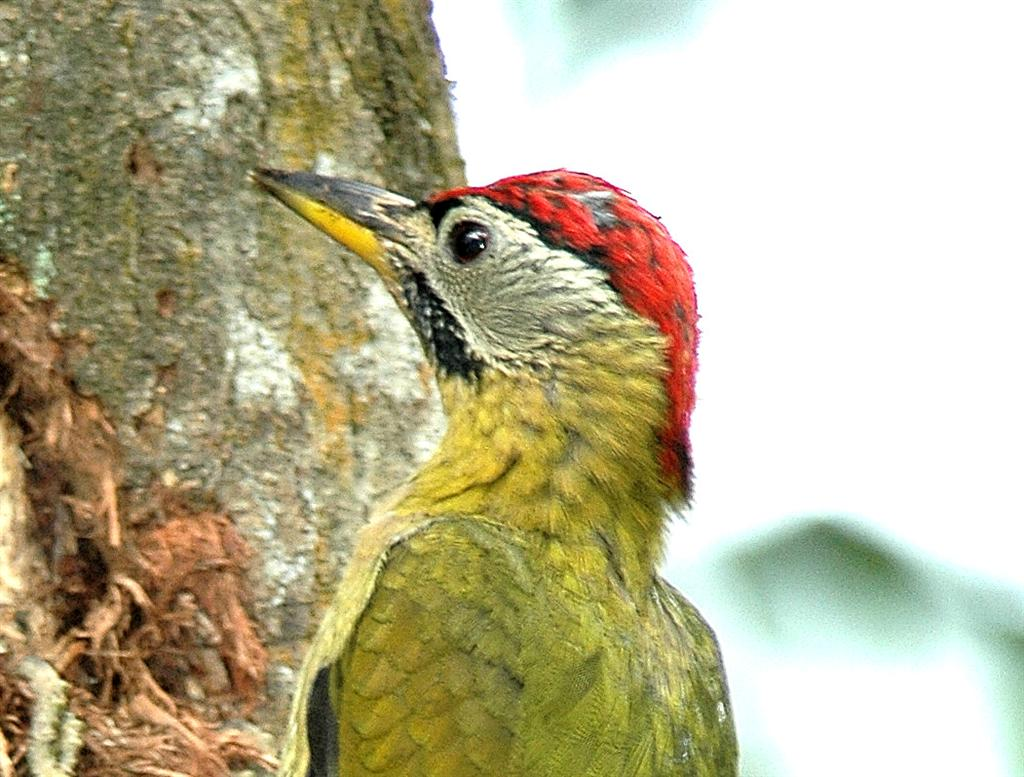

Conservation status
- Least Concern (IUCN 3.1)

Scientific classification
- Kingdom: Animalia
- Phylum: Chordata
- Class: Aves
- Order: Piciformes
- Family: Picidae
- Genus: Picus
- Species: P. vittatus

Binomial name
- Picus vittatus Vieillot, 1818

= Laced woodpecker =

Species of bird

The laced woodpecker (Picus vittatus) is a species of bird in the family Picidae.

It is found throughout Southeast Asia in the countries of Cambodia, China, Indonesia, Laos, Malaysia, Myanmar, Singapore, Thailand and Vietnam. A sole specimen recorded for Bangladesh has since been reidentified as a streak-breasted woodpecker.

Its natural habitats are subtropical or tropical dry forest, subtropical or tropical moist lowland forest, subtropical or tropical mangrove forest, and subtropical or tropical moist montane forest.

== Gallery ==
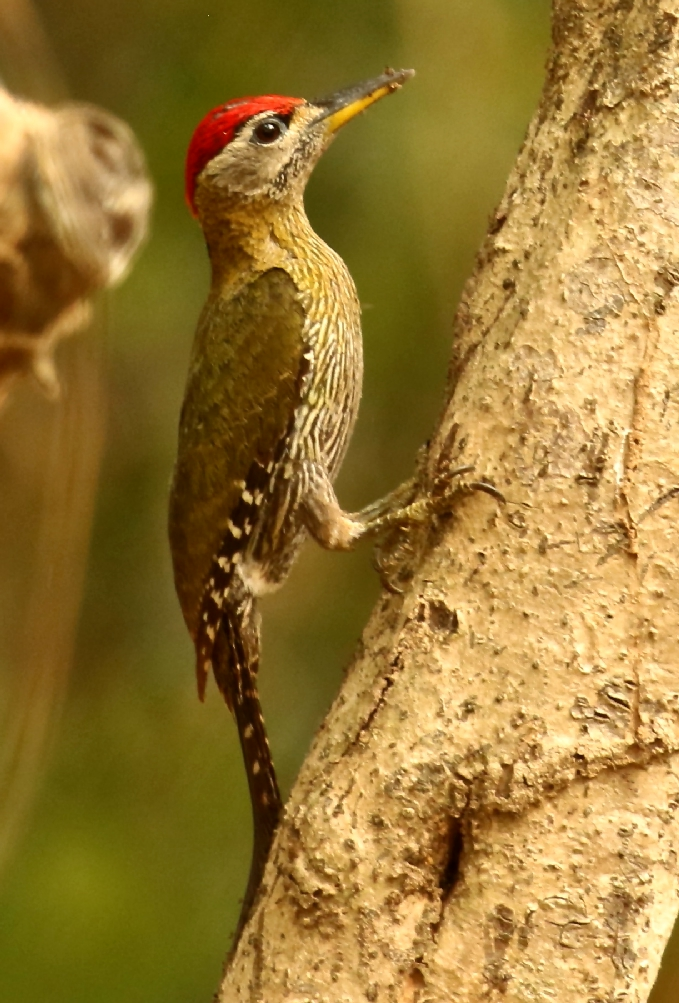
Kaeng Krachen Nat'l Park - Thailand

Kuala Selangor, Malaysia, Sept 1997
