= Lesser yellownape =

- Male
- Female

Conservation status
- Least Concern (IUCN 3.1)

Scientific classification
- Kingdom: Animalia
- Phylum: Chordata
- Class: Aves
- Order: Piciformes
- Family: Picidae
- Genus: Picus
- Species: P. chlorolophus

Binomial name
- Picus chlorolophus Vieillot, 1818

Species of bird

The lesser yellownape (Picus chlorolophus) is a type of woodpecker which is a widespread and often common breeder in tropical and sub-tropical Asia, primarily the Indian subcontinent and Southeast Asia. It ranges from India, Bhutan, Nepal, Bangladesh and Sri Lanka eastwards to Thailand, Burma, Cambodia, Laos, Indonesia, Malaysia and Vietnam. Much of the scientific knowledge gathered about this species is sourced from formal studies in various parts of India.

== Description ==
Male

Female

The lesser yellownape is a largish species at 27 cm in length. It has a typical woodpecker shape. The upperparts are green apart from the bright yellow tufted nape. The neck and breast are green and the belly is whitish, finely barred with green. The rump and tail are blackish.

The adult male lesser yellownape has a green head with a white throat. He has red markings above the eye and above the nape, and red moustachial stripes. Females have only a red patch above the ear coverts. Young birds are like the female, but duller. The subspecies occurring in peninsular India has a greyer head.

== Ecology ==
Greater and lesser yellownape, in India

This is a jungle species which nests in a tree cavity, laying two to four white eggs. Like other woodpecking birds, this species has a straight pointed bill, a stiff tail to provide support against tree trunks, and zygodactyl or "yoked" feet, with two toes pointing forward, and two backward. The long tongue can be darted forward to capture insects.

== Subspecies ==
Three subspecies are known.

- chloropus - Himalayan
- chlorigaster - Peninsular
- wellsi - Sri Lanka.
