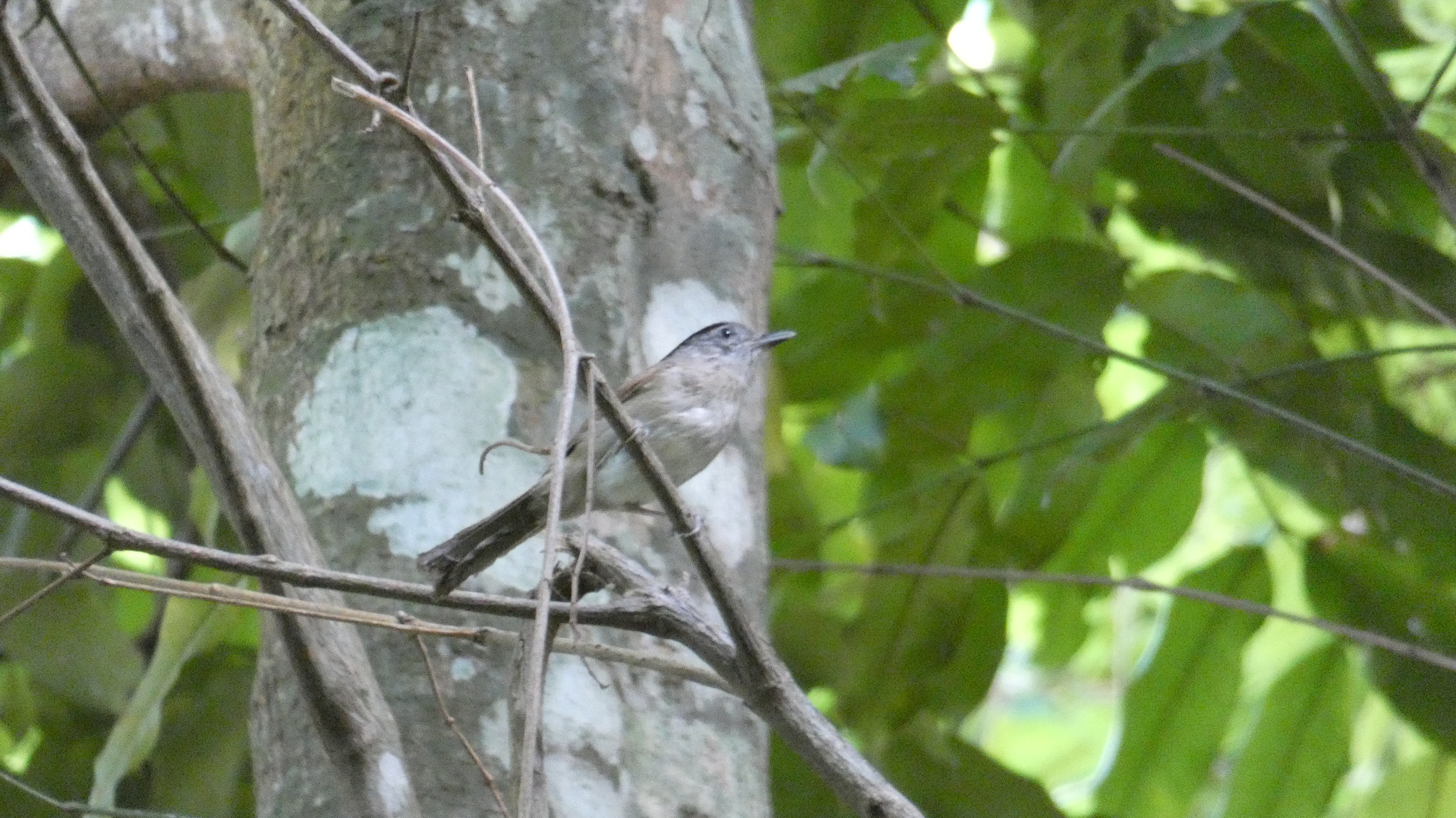

Conservation status
- Least Concern (IUCN 3.1)

Scientific classification
- Kingdom: Animalia
- Phylum: Chordata
- Class: Aves
- Order: Passeriformes
- Family: Leiothrichidae
- Genus: Alcippe
- Species: A. grotei

Binomial name
- Alcippe grotei Delacour, 1936

= Black-browed fulvetta =

Species of bird

The black-browed fulvetta (Alcippe grotei) is a 15.5 to 16.5 cm long species of passerine bird in the family Leiothrichidae. It is found in subtropical or tropical moist montane evergreen forests, adjacent secondary growth and bamboo in Cambodia, Laos, Thailand, and Vietnam.

It is often considered conspecific with the mountain fulvetta, Alcippe peracensis, but the two forms differ in morphology and vocalisations, and are separated altitudinally. Black-browed fulvetta occurs primarily below 400 m, and mountain fulvetta above 900 m.

Both have a warm brown back and tail, whitish underparts, a grey face and a slate grey crown edged below with a black line. Black-browed has brown flanks and a weaker white eyering; it has been described as a bit like a cross between mountain and grey-cheeked fulvetta. The black-browed has a song yu-chi-chiwi-chuwoo, yu-uwit-ii-uwoo, whereas the mountain is yi-yuii-uwee-uwee.

Two subspecies are recognised:

- A. g. eremita Riley, JH, 1936 – southeastern Thailand
- A. g. grotei Delacour, JT, 1936 – northern and central Annam and adjacent Laos
