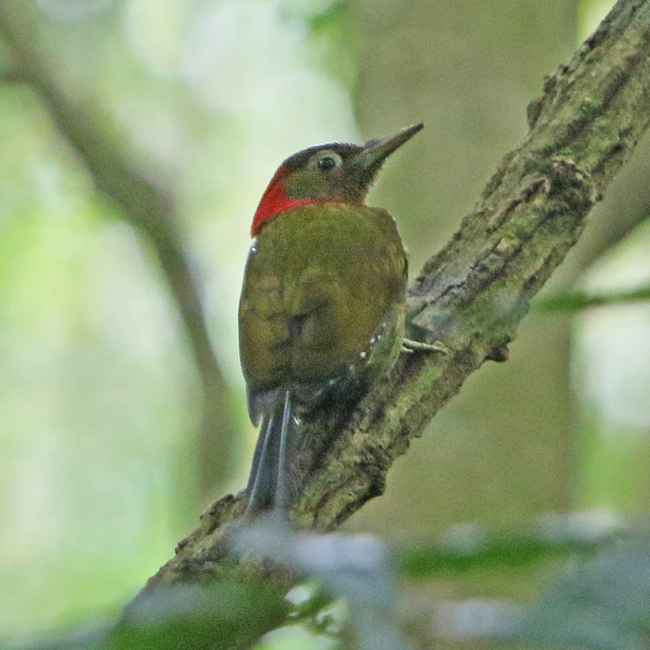

Conservation status
- Near Threatened (IUCN 3.1)

Scientific classification
- Kingdom: Animalia
- Phylum: Chordata
- Class: Aves
- Order: Piciformes
- Family: Picidae
- Genus: Picus
- Species: P. rabieri

Binomial name
- Picus rabieri (Oustalet, 1898)

= Red-collared woodpecker =

Species of bird

The red-collared woodpecker (Picus rabieri) is a species of bird in the family Picidae. It is found in Cambodia, China, Laos, and Vietnam.

Its natural habitat is temperate forests. It is threatened by habitat loss.
