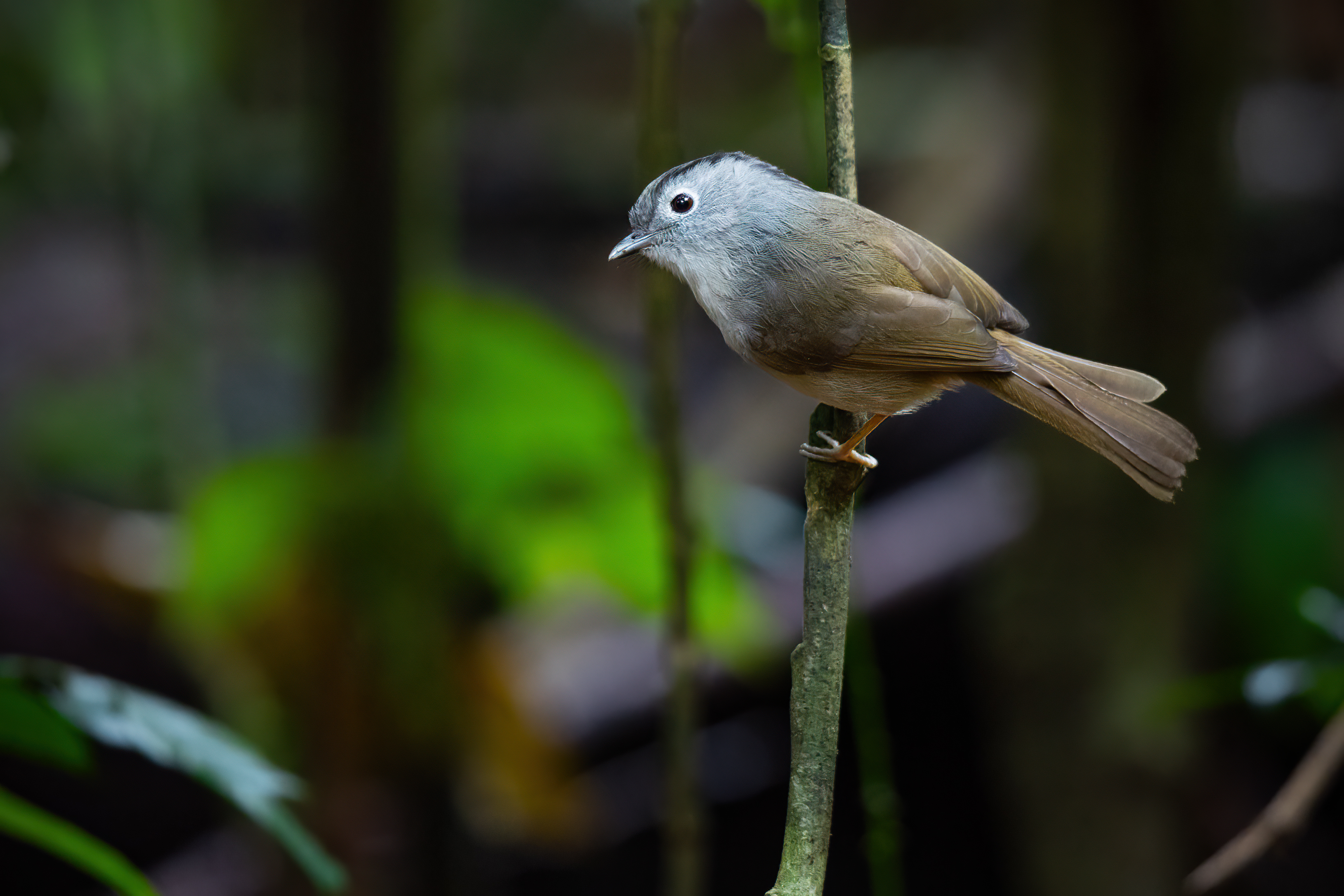

Conservation status
- Least Concern (IUCN 3.1)

Scientific classification
- Kingdom: Animalia
- Phylum: Chordata
- Class: Aves
- Order: Passeriformes
- Family: Leiothrichidae
- Genus: Alcippe
- Species: A. peracensis

Binomial name
- Alcippe peracensis Sharpe, 1887

= Mountain fulvetta =

Species of bird

The mountain fulvetta (Alcippe peracensis) is a 14 to 15.5 cm long species of bird in the family Leiothrichidae. It is found in Cambodia, Laos, Malaysia, Thailand, and Vietnam in subtropical or tropical moist montane forests.

The black-browed fulvetta, Alcippe grotei, is sometimes considered to be conspecific with mountain fulvetta, but the two forms differ in morphology and vocalisations, and are separated altitudinally. Black-browed fulvetta occurs primarily below 400 m, and mountain fulvetta above 900 m.

Both have a warm brown back and tail, whitish underparts, a grey face and a slate grey crown bordered below with a black line, but black-browed has brown flanks and a weaker white eyering. Mountain has a yi-yuii-uwee-uwee song, whereas black-browed's is yu-chi-chiwi-chuwoo, yu-uwit-ii-uwoo.

Two subspecies are recognised:

- A. p. annamensis Robinson, HC & Kloss, CB, 1919 – southern Laos (Bolaven Plateau), southern Annam, and adjacent Cochinchina
- A. p. peracensis Sharpe, RB, 1887 – highlands of Malay Peninsula (northern Perak to southern Selangor and Pahang)
