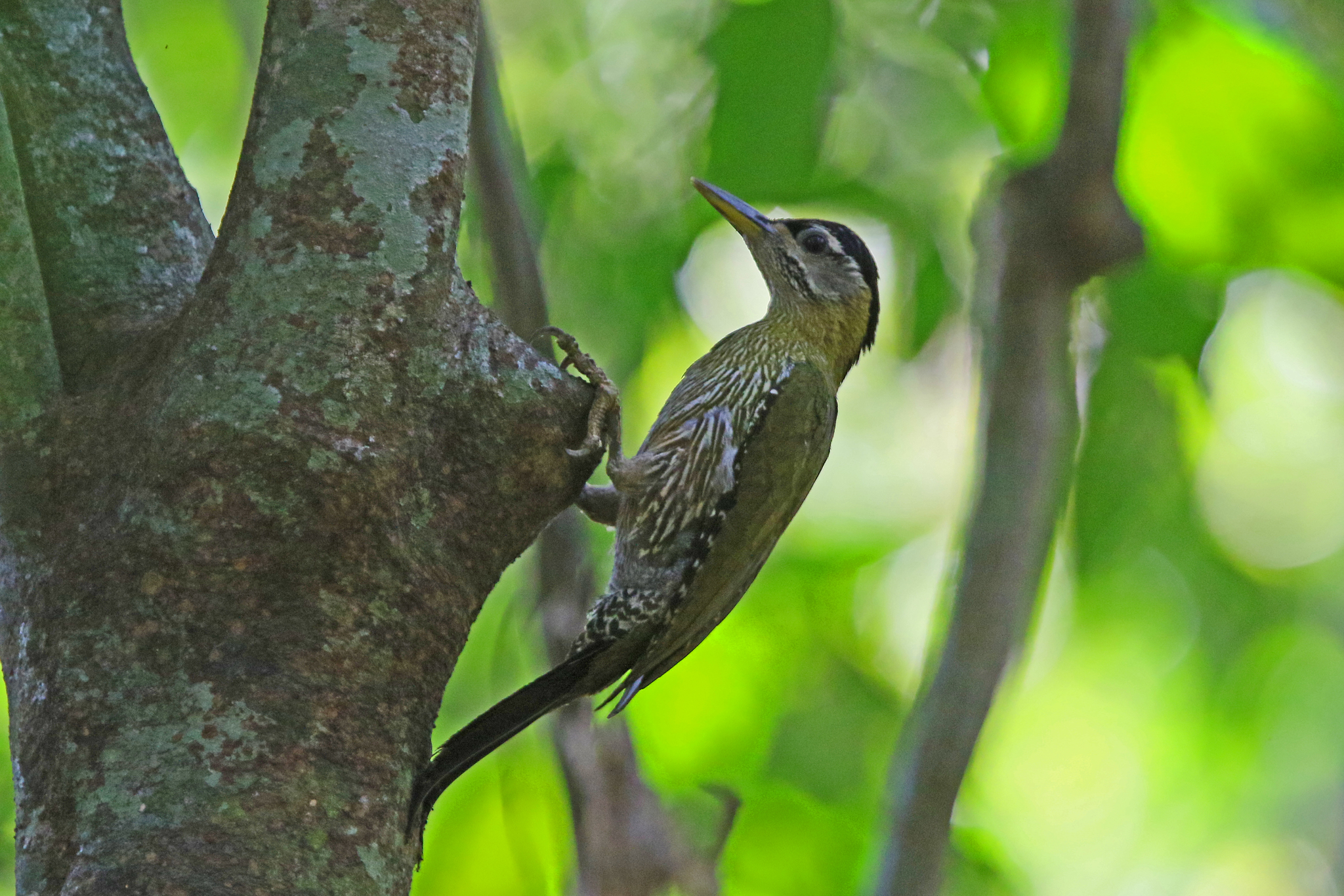
- An adult female at Kaeng Krachan National Park in Thailand

Conservation status
- Least Concern (IUCN 3.1)

Scientific classification
- Kingdom: Animalia
- Phylum: Chordata
- Class: Aves
- Order: Piciformes
- Family: Picidae
- Genus: Picus
- Species: P. viridanus

Binomial name
- Picus viridanus Blyth, 1843

= Streak-breasted woodpecker =

Species of bird

The streak-breasted woodpecker (Picus viridanus) is a species of bird in the family Picidae.

It is found from far southeastern Bangladesh to central Malay Peninsula. Its natural habitats are subtropical or tropical moist lowland forest and subtropical or tropical mangrove forest.

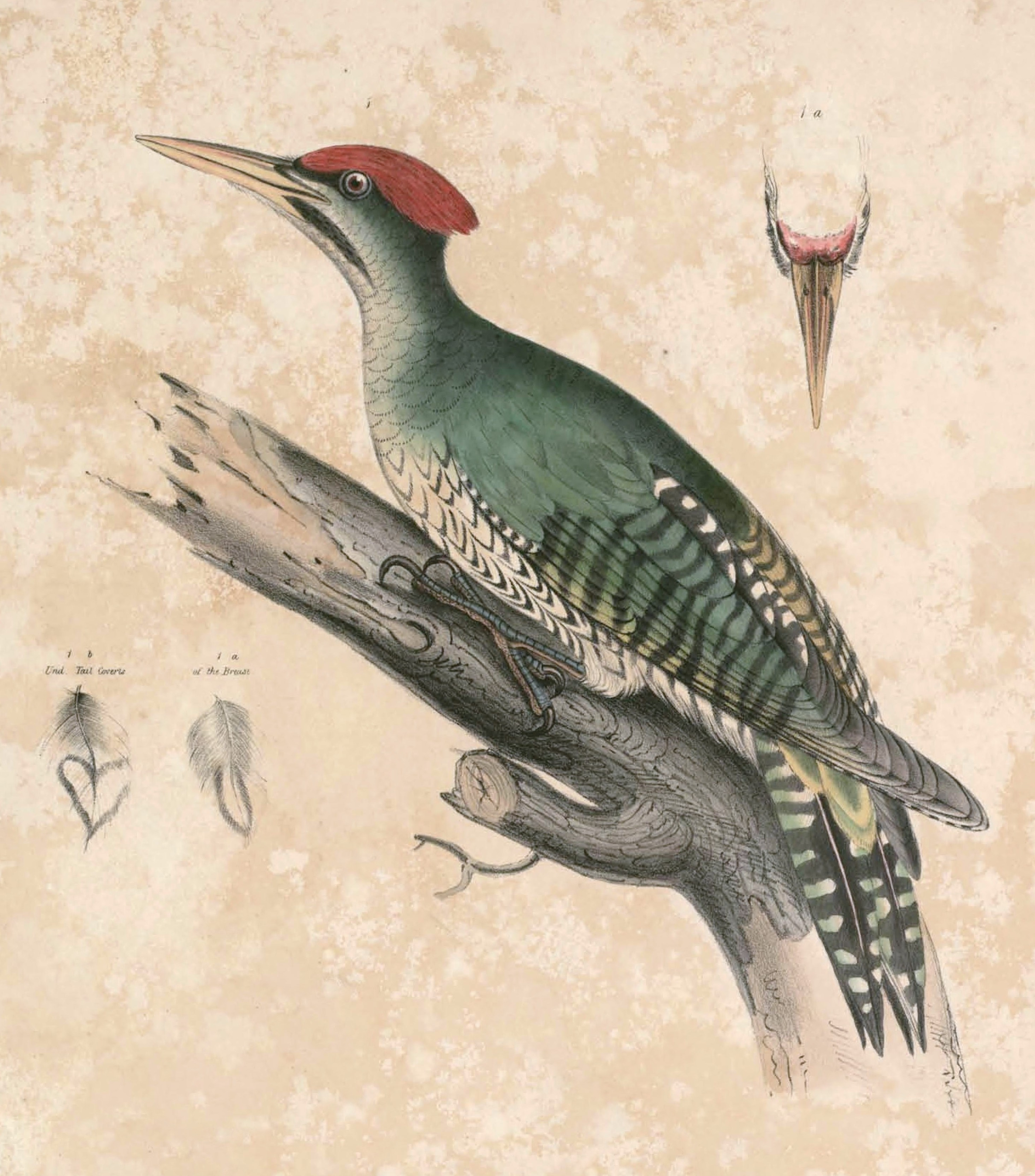
Illustration of an adult male
