= List of birds of Macau =

This is a list of the bird species recorded in Macau. The avifauna of Macau include a total of 416 species, of which 6 have been introduced by humans.

This list's taxonomic treatment (designation and sequence of orders, families and species) and nomenclature (common and scientific names) follow the conventions of The Clements Checklist of Birds of the World, 2022 edition. The family accounts at the beginning of each heading reflect this taxonomy, as do the species counts found in each family account. Introduced species are included in the total count for Macau.

The following tags have been used to highlight accidental and introduced species. The commonly occurring native species are untagged.

- (A) Accidental - a species that rarely or accidentally occurs in Macau
- (I) Introduced - a species introduced to Macau as a consequence, direct or indirect, of human actions

== Ducks, geese, and waterfowl ==
Order: Anseriformes Family: Anatidae

The family Anatidae includes the ducks and most duck-like waterfowl, such as geese and swans. These birds are adapted to an aquatic existence with webbed feet, flattened bills, and feathers that are excellent at shedding water due to an oily coating.

- Lesser whistling-duck, Dendrocygna javanica
- Graylag goose, Anser anser
- Ruddy shelduck, Tadorna ferruginea
- Common shelduck, Tadorna tadorna
- Garganey, Spatula querquedula
- Northern shoveler, Spatula clypeata
- Gadwall, Mareca strepera
- Eurasian wigeon, Mareca penelope
- Eastern spot-billed duck, Anas zonorhyncha
- Mallard, Anas platyrhynchos
- Northern pintail, Anas acuta
- Green-winged teal, Anas crecca
- Common pochard, Aythya ferina
- Tufted duck, Aythya fuligula
- Common goldeneye, Bucephala clangula

== Pheasants, grouse, and allies ==
Order: Galliformes Family: Phasianidae

The Phasianidae are a family of terrestrial birds which consists of quails, partridges, snowcocks, francolins, spurfowls, tragopans, monals, pheasants, peafowls and jungle fowls. In general, they are plump (although they vary in size) and have broad, relatively short wings.

- Ring-necked pheasant, Phasianus colchicus
- Red junglefowl, Gallus gallus
- Chinese francolin, Francolinus pintadeanus
- Japanese quail, Coturnix japonica (A)

== Flamingos ==
Order: Phoenicopteriformes Family: Phoenicopteridae

Flamingos are gregarious wading birds, usually 3 to 5 feet (0.9 to 1.5 m) tall, found in both the Western and Eastern Hemispheres. Flamingos filter-feed on shellfish and algae. Their oddly shaped beaks are specially adapted to separate mud and silt from the food they consume and, uniquely, are used upside-down.

- Greater flamingo, Phoenicopterus roseus (I)

== Grebes ==
Order: Podicipediformes Family: Podicipedidae

Grebes are small to medium-large freshwater diving birds. They have lobed toes and are excellent swimmers and divers. However, they have their feet placed far back on the body, making them quite ungainly on land.

- Little grebe, Tachybaptus ruficollis
- Great crested grebe, Podiceps cristatus
- Eared grebe, Podiceps nigricollis

== Pigeons and doves ==
Order: Columbiformes Family: Columbidae

Pigeons and doves are stout-bodied birds with short necks and short slender bills with a fleshy cere.

- Rock pigeon, Columba livia
- Oriental turtle-dove, Streptopelia orientalis
- Eurasian collared-dove, Streptopelia decaocto
- Red collared-dove, Streptopelia tranquebarica
- Spotted dove, Streptopelia chinensis
- Barred cuckoo-dove, Macropygia unchall (A)
- Asian emerald dove, Chalcophaps indica
- White-bellied green-pigeon, Treron sieboldii

== Cuckoos ==
Order: Cuculiformes Family: Cuculidae

The family Cuculidae includes cuckoos, roadrunners and anis. These are birds of variable sizes with slender bodies, long tails and strong legs.

- Greater coucal, Centropus sinensis
- Lesser coucal, Centropus bengalensis
- Green-billed malkoha, Phaenicophaeus tristis
- Chestnut-winged cuckoo, Clamator coromandus
- Asian koel, Eudynamys scolopaceus
- Asian emerald cuckoo, Chrysococcyx maculatus
- Plaintive cuckoo, Cacomantis merulinus
- Square-tailed drongo-cuckoo, Surniculus lugubris (A)
- Large hawk-cuckoo, Hierococcyx sparverioides
- Northern hawk-cuckoo, Hierococcyx hyperythrus
- Hodgson's hawk-cuckoo, Hierococcyx nisicolor
- Lesser cuckoo, Cuculus poliocephalus
- Indian cuckoo, Cuculus micropterus
- Common cuckoo, Cuculus canorus
- Oriental cuckoo, Cuculus optatus

== Nightjars and allies ==
Order: Caprimulgiformes Family: Caprimulgidae

Nightjars are medium-sized nocturnal birds that usually nest on the ground. They have long wings, short legs and very short bills. Most have small feet, of little use for walking, and long pointed wings. Their soft plumage is camouflaged to resemble bark or leaves.

- Gray nightjar, Caprimulgus jotaka (A)
- Savanna nightjar, Caprimulgus affinis

== Swifts ==
Order: Caprimulgiformes Family: Apodidae

Swifts are small birds which spend the majority of their lives flying. These birds have very short legs and never settle voluntarily on the ground, perching instead only on vertical surfaces. Many swifts have long swept-back wings which resemble a crescent or boomerang.

- White-throated needletail, Hirundapus caudacutus
- Himalayan swiftlet, Aerodramus brevirostris
- Pacific swift, Apus pacificus
- Little swift, Apus affinis
- House swift, Apus nipalensis

== Rails, gallinules, and coots ==
Order: Gruiformes Family: Rallidae

Rallidae is a large family of small to medium-sized birds which includes the rails, crakes, coots and gallinules. Typically they inhabit dense vegetation in damp environments near lakes, swamps or rivers. In general they are shy and secretive birds, making them difficult to observe. Most species have strong legs and long toes which are well adapted to soft uneven surfaces. They tend to have short, rounded wings and to be weak fliers.

- Brown-cheeked rail, Rallus indicus
- Slaty-breasted rail, Lewinia striata
- Eurasian moorhen, Gallinula chloropus
- Eurasian coot, Fulica atra
- Watercock, Gallicrex cinerea
- White-breasted waterhen, Amaurornis phoenicurus
- Slaty-legged crake, Rallina eurizonoides
- Ruddy-breasted crake, Zapornia fusca
- Brown crake, Zapornia akool

== Cranes ==
Order: Gruiformes Family: Gruidae

Cranes are large, long-legged and long-necked birds. Unlike the similar-looking but unrelated herons, cranes fly with necks outstretched, not pulled back. Most have elaborate and noisy courting displays or "dances".

- Common crane, Grus grus
- Red-crowned crane, Grus japonensis

== Stilts and avocets ==
Order: Charadriiformes Family: Recurvirostridae

Recurvirostridae is a family of large wading birds, which includes the avocets and stilts. The avocets have long legs and long up-curved bills. The stilts have extremely long legs and long, thin, straight bills.

- Black-winged stilt, Himantopus himantopus
- Pied avocet, Recurvirostra avosetta

== Oystercatchers ==
The oystercatchers are large and noisy plover-like birds, with strong bills used for smashing or prising open molluscs.

- Eurasian oystercatcher, Haematopus ostralegus

== Plovers and lapwings ==
Order: Charadriiformes Family: Charadriidae

The family Charadriidae includes the plovers, dotterels and lapwings. They are small to medium-sized birds with compact bodies, short, thick necks and long, usually pointed, wings. They are found in open country worldwide, mostly in habitats near water.

- Black-bellied plover, Pluvialis squatarola
- Pacific golden-plover, Pluvialis fulva
- Northern lapwing, Vanellus vanellus (A)
- Gray-headed lapwing, Vanellus cinereus
- Lesser sand-plover, Charadrius mongolus
- Greater sand-plover, Charadrius leschenaultii
- Kentish plover, Charadrius alexandrinus
- White-faced plover, Charadrius dealbatus
- Long-billed plover, Charadrius placidus
- Little ringed plover, Charadrius dubius
- Oriental plover, Charadrius veredus

== Painted-snipes ==
Order: Charadriiformes Family: Rostratulidae

Painted-snipes are short-legged, long-billed birds similar in shape to the true snipes, but more brightly colored.

- Greater painted-snipe, Rostratula benghalensis

== Jacanas ==
Order: Charadriiformes Family: Jacanidae

The jacanas are a group of tropical waders in the family Jacanidae. They are found throughout the tropics. They are identifiable by their huge feet and claws which enable them to walk on floating vegetation in the shallow lakes that are their preferred habitat.

- Pheasant-tailed jacana, Hydrophasianus chirurgus

== Sandpipers and allies ==
Order: Charadriiformes Family: Scolopacidae

Scolopacidae is a large diverse family of small to medium-sized shorebirds including the sandpipers, curlews, godwits, shanks, tattlers, woodcocks, snipes, dowitchers and phalaropes. The majority of these species eat small invertebrates picked out of the mud or soil. Variation in length of legs and bills enables multiple species to feed in the same habitat, particularly on the coast, without direct competition for food.

- Whimbrel, Numenius phaeopus
- Eurasian curlew, Numenius arquata
- Bar-tailed godwit, Limosa lapponica
- Black-tailed godwit, Limosa limosa
- Ruddy turnstone, Arenaria interpres
- Broad-billed sandpiper, Calidris falcinellus
- Sharp-tailed sandpiper, Calidris acuminata
- Curlew sandpiper, Calidris ferruginea
- Temminck's stint, Calidris temminckii
- Long-toed stint, Calidris subminuta
- Spoon-billed sandpiper, Calidris pygmaea
- Red-necked stint, Calidris ruficollis
- Sanderling, Calidris alba
- Dunlin, Calidris alpina
- Little stint, Calidris minuta (A)
- Asian dowitcher, Limnodromus semipalmatus
- Eurasian woodcock, Scolopax rusticola
- Solitary snipe, Gallinago solitaria
- Common snipe, Gallinago gallinago
- Pin-tailed snipe, Gallinago stenura
- Terek sandpiper, Xenus cinereus
- Red-necked phalarope, Phalaropus lobatus
- Common sandpiper, Actitis hypoleucos
- Green sandpiper, Tringa ochropus
- Gray-tailed tattler, Tringa brevipes
- Spotted redshank, Tringa erythropus (A)
- Common greenshank, Tringa nebularia
- Nordmann's greenshank, Tringa guttifer
- Marsh sandpiper, Tringa stagnatilis
- Wood sandpiper, Tringa glareola
- Common redshank, Tringa totanus

== Buttonquail ==
Order: Charadriiformes Family: Turnicidae

The buttonquail are small, drab, running birds which resemble the true quails. The female is the brighter of the sexes and initiates courtship. The male incubates the eggs and tends the young.

- Small buttonquail, Turnix sylvatica
- Yellow-legged buttonquail, Turnix tanki
- Barred buttonquail, Turnix suscitator

== Pratincoles and coursers ==
Order: Charadriiformes Family: Glareolidae

Glareolidae is a family of wading birds comprising the pratincoles, which have short legs, long pointed wings and long forked tails, and the coursers, which have long legs, short wings and long, pointed bills which curve downwards.

- Oriental pratincole, Glareola maldivarum

== Skuas and jaegers ==
Order: Charadriiformes Family: Stercorariidae

The family Stercorariidae are, in general, medium to large birds, typically with gray or brown plumage, often with white markings on the wings. They nest on the ground in temperate and arctic regions and are long-distance migrants.

- Pomarine jaeger, Stercorarius pomarinus

== Gulls, terns, and skimmers ==
Order: Charadriiformes Family: Laridae

Laridae is a family of medium to large seabirds, the gulls, terns, and skimmers. Gulls are typically grey or white, often with black markings on the head or wings. They have stout, longish bills and webbed feet. Terns are a group of generally medium to large seabirds typically with grey or white plumage, often with black markings on the head. Most terns hunt for fish by diving but some pick insects off the surface of fresh water. Terns are generally long-lived birds, with several species known to live in excess of 30 years.

- Saunders's gull, Chroicocephalus saundersi
- Black-headed gull, Chroicocephalus ridibundus
- Brown-headed gull, Chroicocephalus brunnicephalus
- Black-tailed gull, Larus crassirostris
- Herring gull, Larus argentatus
- Lesser black-backed gull, Larus fuscus
- White tern, Gygis alba
- Sooty tern, Onychoprion fuscatus
- Gull-billed tern, Gelochelidon nilotica
- Caspian tern, Hydroprogne caspia
- White-winged tern, Chlidonias leucopterus (A)
- Whiskered tern, Chlidonias hybrida
- Black-naped tern, Sterna sumatrana
- Great crested tern, Thalasseus bergii

== Southern storm-petrels ==
Order: Procellariiformes Family: Oceanitidae

The southern storm-petrels are relatives of the petrels and are the smallest seabirds. They feed on planktonic crustaceans and small fish picked from the surface, typically while hovering. The flight is fluttering and sometimes bat-like.

- White-bellied storm-petrel, Fregetta grallaria

== Northern storm-petrels ==
Order: Procellariiformes Family: Hydrobatidae

The northern storm-petrels are relatives of the petrels and are the smallest seabirds. They feed on planktonic crustaceans and small fish picked from the surface, typically while hovering. The flight is fluttering and sometimes bat-like.

- Swinhoe's storm-petrel, Hydrobates monorhis

== Shearwaters and petrels ==
Order: Procellariiformes Family: Procellariidae

The procellariids are the main group of medium-sized "true petrels", characterised by united nostrils with medium septum and a long outer functional primary.

- Black-winged petrel, Pterodroma nigripennis
- Bulwer's petrel, Bulweria bulwerii
- Streaked shearwater, Calonectris leucomelas
- Wedge-tailed shearwater, Ardenna pacifica

== Storks ==
Order: Ciconiiformes Family: Ciconiidae

Storks are large, long-legged, long-necked, wading birds with long, stout bills. Storks are mute, but bill-clattering is an important mode of communication at the nest. Their nests can be large and may be reused for many years. Many species are migratory.

- Black stork, Ciconia nigra
- Oriental stork, Ciconia boyciana

== Frigatebirds ==
Order: Suliformes Family: Fregatidae

Frigatebirds are large seabirds usually found over tropical oceans. They are large, black-and-white or completely black, with long wings and deeply forked tails. The males have colored inflatable throat pouches. They do not swim or walk and cannot take off from a flat surface. Having the largest wingspan-to-body-weight ratio of any bird, they are essentially aerial, able to stay aloft for more than a week.

- Lesser frigatebird, Fregata ariel
- Great frigatebird, Fregata minor

== Boobies and gannets ==
Order: Suliformes Family: Sulidae

The sulids comprise the gannets and boobies. Both groups are medium to large coastal seabirds that plunge-dive for fish.

- Brown booby, Sula leucogaster

== Cormorants and shags ==
Order: Suliformes Family: Phalacrocoracidae

Phalacrocoracidae is a family of medium to large coastal, fish-eating seabirds that includes cormorants and shags. Plumage coloration varies, with the majority having mainly dark plumage, some species being black-and-white and a few being colorful.

- Great cormorant, Phalacrocorax carbo

== Herons, egrets, and bitterns ==
Order: Pelecaniformes Family: Ardeidae

The family Ardeidae contains the bitterns, herons, and egrets. Herons and egrets are medium to large wading birds with long necks and legs. Bitterns tend to be shorter necked and more wary. Members of Ardeidae fly with their necks retracted, unlike other long-necked birds such as storks, ibises and spoonbills.

- Great bittern, Botaurus stellaris
- Yellow bittern, Ixobrychus sinensis
- Schrenck's bittern, Ixobrychus eurhythmus
- Cinnamon bittern, Ixobrychus cinnamomeus
- Black bittern, Ixobrychus flavicollis
- Gray heron, Ardea cinerea
- Purple heron, Ardea purpurea
- Great egret, Ardea alba
- Intermediate egret, Ardea intermedia
- Chinese egret, Egretta eulophotes
- Little egret, Egretta garzetta
- Pacific reef-heron, Egretta sacra
- Cattle egret, Bubulcus ibis
- Chinese pond-heron, Ardeola bacchus
- Striated heron, Butorides striata
- Black-crowned night-heron, Nycticorax nycticorax
- Malayan night-heron, Gorsachius melanolophus (A)

== Ibises and spoonbills ==
Order: Pelecaniformes Family: Threskiornithidae

Threskiornithidae is a family of large terrestrial and wading birds which includes the ibises and spoonbills. They have long, broad wings with 11 primary and about 20 secondary feathers. They are strong fliers and despite their size and weight, very capable soarers.

- Black-headed ibis, Threskiornis melanocephalus
- Eurasian spoonbill, Platalea leucorodia
- Black-faced spoonbill, Platalea minor

== Osprey ==
Order: Accipitriformes Family: Pandionidae

The family Pandionidae contains only one species, the osprey. The osprey is a medium-large raptor which is a specialist fish-eater with a worldwide distribution.

- Osprey, Pandion haliaetus

== Hawks, eagles, and kites ==
Order: Accipitriformes Family: Accipitridae

Accipitridae is a family of birds of prey and includes the hawks, eagles, kites, harriers, and Old World vultures. These birds have powerful hooked beaks for tearing flesh from their prey, strong legs, powerful talons and keen eyesight.

- Black-winged kite, Elanus caeruleus
- Oriental honey-buzzard, Pernis ptilorhynchus
- Black baza, Aviceda leuphotes
- Crested serpent-eagle, Spilornis cheela
- Greater spotted eagle, Clanga clanga
- Steppe eagle, Aquila nipalensis
- Imperial eagle, Aquila heliaca
- Golden eagle, Aquila chrysaetos
- Bonelli's eagle, Aquila fasciata
- Gray-faced buzzard, Butastur indicus
- Eastern marsh-harrier, Circus spilonotus
- Pied harrier, Circus melanoleucos
- Crested goshawk, Accipiter trivirgatus
- Chinese sparrowhawk, Accipiter soloensis
- Japanese sparrowhawk, Accipiter gularis
- Besra, Accipiter virgatus
- Eurasian sparrowhawk, Accipiter nisus
- Northern goshawk, Accipiter gentilis
- Black kite, Milvus migrans
- Brahminy kite, Haliastur indus
- White-bellied sea-eagle, Haliaeetus leucogaster
- Rough-legged hawk, Buteo lagopus
- Common buzzard, Buteo buteo
- Eastern buzzard, Buteo japonicus

== Barn-owls ==
Order: Strigiformes Family: Tytonidae

Barn-owls are medium to large owls with large heads and characteristic heart-shaped faces. They have long strong legs with powerful talons.

- Australasian grass-owl, Tyto longimembris
- Eastern barn owl, Tyto javanica

== Owls ==
Order: Strigiformes Family: Strigidae

The typical owls are small to large solitary nocturnal birds of prey. They have large forward-facing eyes and ears, a hawk-like beak and a conspicuous circle of feathers around each eye, called a facial disk.

- Mountain scops-owl, Otus spilocephalus
- Collared scops-owl, Otus lettia
- Oriental scops-owl, Otus sunia
- Eurasian eagle-owl, Bubo bubo
- Brown fish-owl, Ketupa zeylonensis
- Tawny fish-owl, Ketupa flavipes
- Asian barred owlet, Glaucidium cuculoides
- Brown wood-owl, Strix leptogrammica
- Long-eared owl, Asio otus
- Short-eared owl, Asio flammeus (A)
- Brown boobook, Ninox scutulata
- Northern boobook, Ninox japonica

== Trogons ==
Order: Trogoniformes Family: Trogonidae

The family Trogonidae includes trogons and quetzals. Found in tropical woodlands worldwide, they feed on insects and fruit, and their broad bills and weak legs reflect their diet and arboreal habits. Although their flight is fast, they are reluctant to fly any distance. Trogons have soft, often colorful, feathers with distinctive male and female plumage.

- Red-headed trogon, Harpactes erythrocephalus

== Hoopoes ==
Order: Bucerotiformes Family: Upupidae

Hoopoes have black, white and orangey-pink colouring with a large erectile crest on their head.

- Eurasian hoopoe, Upupa epops

== Kingfishers ==
Order: Coraciiformes Family: Alcedinidae

Kingfishers are medium-sized birds with large heads, long, pointed bills, short legs and stubby tails.

- Common kingfisher, Alcedo atthis
- Ruddy kingfisher, Halcyon coromanda
- White-throated kingfisher, Halcyon smyrnensis
- Black-capped kingfisher, Halcyon pileata
- Crested kingfisher, Megaceryle lugubris
- Pied kingfisher, Ceryle rudis

== Bee-eaters ==
Order: Coraciiformes Family: Meropidae

The bee-eaters are a group of near passerine birds in the family Meropidae. Most species are found in Africa but others occur in southern Europe, Madagascar, Australia and New Guinea. They are characterized by richly colored plumage, slender bodies and usually elongated central tail feathers. All are colorful and have long downturned bills and pointed wings, which give them a swallow-like appearance when seen from afar.

- Blue-throated bee-eater, Merops viridis
- Blue-tailed bee-eater, Merops philippinus

== Rollers ==
Order: Coraciiformes Family: Coraciidae

Rollers resemble crows in size and build, but are more closely related to the kingfishers and bee-eaters. They share the colourful appearance of those groups, with blues and browns predominating. The two inner front toes are connected, but the outer toe is not.

- Dollarbird, Eurystomus orientalis

== Asian barbets ==
Order: Piciformes Family: Megalaimidae

The Asian barbets are plump birds, with short necks and large heads. They get their name from the bristles which fringe their heavy bills. Most species are brightly colored.

- Great barbet, Psilopogon virens

== Woodpeckers ==
Order: Piciformes Family: Picidae

Woodpeckers are small to medium-sized birds with chisel-like beaks, short legs, stiff tails and long tongues used for capturing insects. Some species have feet with two toes pointing forward and two backward, while several species have only three toes. Many woodpeckers have the habit of tapping noisily on tree trunks with their beaks.

- Eurasian wryneck, Jynx torquilla
- Speckled piculet, Picumnus innominatus

== Falcons and caracaras ==
Order: Falconiformes Family: Falconidae

Falconidae is a family of diurnal birds of prey. They differ from hawks, eagles and kites in that they kill with their beaks instead of their talons.

- Pied falconet, Microhierax melanoleucos
- Eurasian kestrel, Falco tinnunculus
- Amur falcon, Falco amurensis
- Merlin, Falco columbarius
- Eurasian hobby, Falco subbuteo
- Oriental hobby, Falco severus
- Peregrine falcon, Falco peregrinus

== Cockatoos ==
Order: Psittaciformes Family: Cacatuidae

The cockatoos share many features with other parrots including the characteristic curved beak shape and a zygodactyl foot, with two forward toes and two backwards toes. They differ, however in a number of characteristics, including the often spectacular movable headcrest.

- Yellow-crested cockatoo, Cacatua sulphurea (A)

== Old World parrots ==
Order: Psittaciformes Family: Psittaculidae

Old World parrots are small to large birds with a characteristic curved beak. Their upper mandibles have slight mobility in the joint with the skull and they have a generally erect stance. All parrots are zygodactyl, having the four toes on each foot with two at the front and two at the back.

- Rose-ringed parakeet, Psittacula krameri (I)

== Pittas ==
Order: Passeriformes Family: Pittidae

Pittas are medium-sized by passerine standards and are stocky, with fairly long, strong legs, short tails and stout bills. Many, but not all, are brightly colored. They spend the majority of their time on wet forest floors, eating snails, insects and similar invertebrates.

- Fairy pitta, Pitta nympha (A)

== Cuckooshrikes ==
Order: Passeriformes Family: Campephagidae

The cuckooshrikes are small to medium-sized passerine birds. They are predominantly grayish with white and black, although some species are brightly colored.

- Gray-chinned minivet, Pericrocotus solaris
- Short-billed minivet, Pericrocotus brevirostris
- Scarlet minivet, Pericrocotus flammeus
- Ashy minivet, Pericrocotus divaricatus
- Brown-rumped minivet, Pericrocotus cantonensis
- Large cuckooshrike, Coracina macei
- Black-winged cuckooshrike, Coracina melaschistos

== Vireos, shrike-babblers, and erpornis ==
Order: Passeriformes Family: Vireonidae

Most of the members of this family are found in the New World. However, the shrike-babblers and erpornis, which only slightly resemble the "true" vireos and greenlets, are found in South East Asia.

- White-bellied erpornis, Erpornis zantholeuca

== Old World orioles ==
Order: Passeriformes Family: Oriolidae

The Old World orioles are colorful passerine birds. They are not related to the New World orioles.

- Black-naped oriole, Oriolus chinensis

== Woodswallows, bellmagpies, and allies ==
Order: Passeriformes Family: Artamidae

The woodswallows are soft-plumaged, somber-colored passerine birds. They are smooth, agile flyers with moderately large, semi-triangular wings.

- Ashy woodswallow, Artamus fuscus

== Vangas, helmetshrikes, and allies ==
Order: Passeriformes Family: Vangidae

The family Vangidae is highly variable, though most members of it resemble true shrikes to some degree.

- Large woodshrike, Tephrodornis gularis

== Drongos ==
Order: Passeriformes Family: Dicruridae

The drongos are mostly black or dark grey in colour, sometimes with metallic tints. They have long forked tails, and some Asian species have elaborate tail decorations. They have short legs and sit very upright when perched, like a shrike. They flycatch or take prey from the ground.

- Black drongo, Dicrurus macrocercus
- Ashy drongo, Dicrurus leucophaeus
- Hair-crested drongo, Dicrurus hottentottus

== Monarch flycatchers ==
Order: Passeriformes Family: Monarchidae

The monarch flycatchers are small to medium-sized insectivorous passerines which hunt by flycatching.

- Black-naped monarch, Hypothymis azurea
- Japanese paradise-flycatcher, Terpsiphone atrocaudata (A)
- Amur paradise-flycatcher, Terpsiphone incei

== Shrikes ==
Order: Passeriformes Family: Laniidae

Shrikes are passerine birds known for their habit of catching other birds and small animals and impaling the uneaten portions of their bodies on thorns. A typical shrike's beak is hooked, like a bird of prey.

- Tiger shrike, Lanius tigrinus
- Bull-headed shrike, Lanius bucephalus
- Brown shrike, Lanius cristatus
- Burmese shrike, Lanius collurioides
- Long-tailed shrike, Lanius schach
- Chinese gray shrike, Lanius sphenocercus

== Crows, jays, and magpies ==
Order: Passeriformes Family: Corvidae

The family Corvidae includes crows, ravens, jays, choughs, magpies, treepies, nutcrackers and ground jays. Corvids are above average in size among the Passeriformes, and some of the larger species show high levels of intelligence.

- Eurasian jay, Garrulus glandarius
- Azure-winged magpie, Cyanopica cyanus
- Red-billed blue-magpie, Urocissa erythrorhyncha
- Gray treepie, Dendrocitta formosae
- Oriental magpie, Pica serica
- Eurasian magpie, Pica pica
- Large-billed crow, Corvus macrorhynchos
- Collared crow, Corvus torquatus

== Fairy flycatchers ==
Order: Passeriformes Family: Stenostiridae

Most of the species of this small family are found in Africa, though a few inhabit tropical Asia. They are not closely related to other birds called "flycatchers".

- Gray-headed canary-flycatcher, Culicicapa ceylonensis (A)

== Tits, chickadees, and titmice ==
Order: Passeriformes Family: Paridae

The Paridae are mainly small stocky woodland species with short stout bills. Some have crests. They are adaptable birds, with a mixed diet including seeds and insects.

- Japanese tit, Parus minor
- Yellow-cheeked tit, Machlolophus spilonotus

== Penduline-tits ==
Order: Passeriformes Family: Remizidae

The penduline-tits are a group of small passerine birds related to the true tits. They are insectivores.

- Chinese penduline-tit, Remiz consobrinus

== Larks ==
Order: Passeriformes Family: Alaudidae

Larks are small terrestrial birds with often extravagant songs and display flights. Most larks are fairly dull in appearance. Their food is insects and seeds.

- Oriental skylark, Alauda gulgula

== Cisticolas and allies ==
Order: Passeriformes Family: Cisticolidae

The Cisticolidae are warblers found mainly in warmer southern regions of the Old World. They are generally very small birds of drab brown or grey appearance found in open country such as grassland or scrub.

- Common tailorbird, Orthotomus sutorius
- Yellow-bellied prinia, Prinia flaviventris
- Plain prinia, Prinia inornata
- Zitting cisticola, Cisticola juncidis
- Golden-headed cisticola, Cisticola exilis

== Reed warblers and allies ==
Order: Passeriformes Family: Acrocephalidae

The members of this family are usually rather large for "warblers". Most are rather plain olivaceous brown above with much yellow to beige below. They are usually found in open woodland, reedbeds, or tall grass. The family occurs mostly in southern to western Eurasia and surroundings, but it also ranges far into the Pacific, with some species in Africa.

- Thick-billed warbler, Arundinax aedon
- Black-browed reed warbler, Acrocephalus bistrigiceps
- Oriental reed warbler, Acrocephalus orientalis

== Grassbirds and allies ==
Order: Passeriformes Family: Locustellidae

Locustellidae are a family of small insectivorous songbirds found mainly in Eurasia, Africa, and the Australian region. They are smallish birds with tails that are usually long and pointed, and tend to be drab brownish or buffy all over.

- Pallas's grasshopper warbler, Helopsaltes certhiola
- Lanceolated warbler, Locustella lanceolata
- Russet bush warbler, Locustella mandelli (A)

== Cupwings ==
Order: Passeriformes Family: Pnoepygidae

The members of this small family are found in mountainous parts of South and South East Asia.

- Pygmy cupwing, Pnoepyga pusilla

== Swallows ==
Order: Passeriformes Family: Hirundinidae

The family Hirundinidae is adapted to aerial feeding. They have a slender streamlined body, long pointed wings and a short bill with a wide gape. The feet are adapted to perching rather than walking, and the front toes are partially joined at the base.

- Barn swallow, Hirundo rustica
- Red-rumped swallow, Cecropis daurica
- Asian house-martin, Delichon dasypus

== Bulbuls ==
Order: Passeriformes Family: Pycnonotidae

Bulbuls are medium-sized songbirds. Some are colourful with yellow, red or orange vents, cheeks, throats or supercilia, but most are drab, with uniform olive-brown to black plumage. Some species have distinct crests.

- Collared finchbill, Spizixos semitorques
- Red-vented bulbul, Pycnonotus cafer (I)
- Red-whiskered bulbul, Pycnonotus jocosus
- Light-vented bulbul, Pycnonotus sinensis
- Sooty-headed bulbul, Pycnonotus aurigaster
- Black bulbul, Hypsipetes leucocephalus
- Chestnut bulbul, Hemixos castanonotus
- Mountain bulbul, Ixos mcclellandii

== Leaf warblers ==
Order: Passeriformes Family: Phylloscopidae

Leaf warblers are a family of small insectivorous birds found mostly in Eurasia and ranging into Wallacea and Africa. The species are of various sizes, often green-plumaged above and yellow below, or more subdued with greyish-green to greyish-brown colors.

- Yellow-browed warbler, Phylloscopus inornatus
- Hume's warbler, Phylloscopus humei
- Chinese leaf warbler, Phylloscopus yunnanensis
- Pallas's leaf warbler, Phylloscopus proregulus
- Radde's warbler, Phylloscopus schwarzi
- Dusky warbler, Phylloscopus fuscatus
- Eastern crowned warbler, Phylloscopus coronatus
- White-spectacled warbler, Phylloscopus intermedius (A)
- Bianchi's warbler, Phylloscopus valentini (A)
- Martens's warbler, Phylloscopus omeiensis (A)
- Alström's warbler, Phylloscopus soror
- Two-barred warbler, Phylloscopus plumbeitarsus
- Pale-legged leaf warbler, Phylloscopus tenellipes
- Sakhalin leaf warbler, Phylloscopus borealoides
- Arctic warbler, Phylloscopus borealis
- Chestnut-crowned warbler, Phylloscopus castaniceps
- Sulphur-breasted warbler, Phylloscopus ricketti (A)
- Hartert's leaf warbler, Phylloscopus goodsoni

== Bush warblers and allies ==
Order: Passeriformes Family: Scotocercidae

The members of this family are found throughout Africa, Asia, and Polynesia. Their taxonomy is in flux, and some authorities place some genera in other families.

- Pale-footed bush warbler, Urosphena pallidipes (A)
- Asian stubtail, Urosphena squameiceps
- Rufous-faced warbler, Abroscopus albogularis
- Mountain tailorbird, Phyllergates cuculatus
- Manchurian bush warbler, Horornis borealis
- Brownish-flanked bush warbler, Horornis fortipes

== Sylviid warblers, parrotbills, and allies ==
Order: Passeriformes Family: Sylviidae

The family Sylviidae is a group of small insectivorous passerine birds. They mainly occur as breeding species, as the common name implies, in Europe, Asia and, to a lesser extent, Africa. Most are of generally undistinguished appearance, but many have distinctive songs.

- Vinous-throated parrotbill, Sinosuthora webbiana

== White-eyes, yuhinas, and Allies ==
Order: Passeriformes Family: Zosteropidae

The white-eyes are small and mostly undistinguished, their plumage above being generally some dull colour like greenish-olive, but some species have a white or bright yellow throat, breast or lower parts, and several have buff flanks. As their name suggests, many species have a white ring around each eye.

- Indochinese yuhina, Staphida torqueola
- Chestnut-flanked white-eye, Zosterops erythropleurus
- Swinhoe's white-eye, Zosterops simplex

== Tree-babblers, scimitar-babblers, and allies ==
Order: Passeriformes Family: Timaliidae

The babblers, or timaliids, are somewhat diverse in size and coloration, but are characterized by soft fluffy plumage.

- Streak-breasted scimitar-babbler, Pomatorhinus ruficollis

== Laughingthrushes and allies ==
Order: Passeriformes Family: Leiothrichidae

The members of this family are diverse in size and colouration, though those of genus Turdoides tend to be brown or greyish. The family is found in Africa, India, and southeast Asia.

- Huet's fulvetta, Alcippe hueti
- Red-billed leiothrix, Leiothrix lutea
- Silver-eared mesia, Leiothrix argentauris (A)
- Chinese hwamei, Garrulax canorus
- Lesser necklaced laughingthrush, Garrulax monileger
- Black-throated laughingthrush, Pterorhinus chinensis
- Masked laughingthrush, Garrulax perspicillatus
- Greater necklaced laughingthrush, Pterorhinus pectoralis

== Dippers ==
Order: Passeriformes Family: Cinclidae

Dippers are a group of perching birds whose habitat includes aquatic environments in the Americas, Europe and Asia. They are named for their bobbing or dipping movements.

- Brown dipper, Cinclus pallasii

== Starlings ==
Order: Passeriformes Family: Sturnidae

Starlings are small to medium-sized passerine birds. Their flight is strong and direct and they are very gregarious. Their preferred habitat is fairly open country. They eat insects and fruit. Plumage is typically dark with a metallic sheen.

- Asian glossy starling, Aplonis panayensis (A)
- Common hill myna, Gracula religiosa (I)
- Rosy starling, Pastor roseus (A)
- Daurian starling, Agropsar sturninus (A)
- Black-collared starling, Gracupica nigricollis
- White-shouldered starling, Sturnia sinensis
- Red-billed starling, Spodiopsar sericeus
- White-cheeked starling, Spodiopsar cineraceus
- Common myna, Acridotheres tristis (I)
- Crested myna, Acridotheres cristatellus

== Thrushes and allies ==
Order: Passeriformes Family: Turdidae

The thrushes are a group of passerine birds that occur mainly in the Old World. They are plump, soft plumaged, small to medium-sized insectivores or sometimes omnivores, often feeding on the ground. Many have attractive songs.

- White's thrush, Zoothera aurea
- Siberian thrush, Geokichla sibirica
- Orange-headed thrush, Geokichla citrina
- Chinese thrush, Geokichla mupinensis (A)
- Chinese blackbird, Turdus mandarinus
- Japanese thrush, Turdus cardis
- Gray-backed thrush, Turdus hortulorum
- Eyebrowed thrush, Turdus obscurus
- Brown-headed thrush, Turdus chrysolaus
- Pale thrush, Turdus pallidus
- Dusky thrush, Turdus eunomus (A)
- Naumann's thrush, Turdus naumanni (A)

== Old World flycatchers ==
Order: Passeriformes Family: Muscicapidae

Old World flycatchers are a large group of small passerine birds native to the Old World. They are mainly small arboreal insectivores. The appearance of these birds is highly varied, and most have weak songs and harsh calls.

- Gray-streaked flycatcher, Muscicapa griseisticta
- Dark-sided flycatcher, Muscicapa sibirica (A)
- Ferruginous flycatcher, Muscicapa ferruginea
- Asian brown flycatcher, Muscicapa dauurica
- Brown-breasted flycatcher, Muscicapa muttui
- Oriental magpie-robin, Copsychus saularis
- Hainan blue flycatcher, Cyornis hainanus
- Hill blue flycatcher, Cyornis whitei
- Brown-chested jungle-flycatcher, Cyornis brunneatus
- Small niltava, Niltava macgrigoriae
- Fujian niltava, Niltava davidi (A)
- Blue-and-white flycatcher, Cyanoptila cyanomelana
- Verditer flycatcher, Eumyias thalassinus
- Lesser shortwing, Brachypteryx leucophris (A)
- Rufous-tailed robin, Larvivora sibilans
- Japanese robin, Larvivora akahige
- Siberian blue robin, Larvivora cyane
- Bluethroat, Luscinia svecica
- Blue whistling-thrush, Myophonus caeruleus
- White-crowned forktail, Enicurus leschenaulti
- Spotted forktail, Enicurus maculatus
- Siberian rubythroat, Calliope calliope
- White-tailed robin, Myiomela leucura (A)
- Red-flanked bluetail, Tarsiger cyanurus
- Yellow-rumped flycatcher, Ficedula zanthopygia (A)
- Green-backed flycatcher, Ficedula elisae
- Narcissus flycatcher, Ficedula narcissina (A)
- Ryukyu flycatcher, Ficedula owstoni
- Mugimaki flycatcher, Ficedula mugimaki
- Slaty-backed flycatcher, Ficedula erithacus (A)
- Rufous-gorgeted flycatcher, Ficedula strophiata (A)
- Taiga flycatcher, Ficedula albicilla
- Red-breasted flycatcher, Ficedula parva
- Blue-fronted redstart, Phoenicurus frontalis
- Plumbeous redstart, Phoenicurus fuliginosus
- Daurian redstart, Phoenicurus auroreus
- White-throated rock-thrush, Monticola gularis
- Blue rock-thrush, Monticola solitarius
- Amur stonechat, Saxicola stejnegeri
- Gray bushchat, Saxicola ferreus

== Flowerpeckers ==
Order: Passeriformes Family: Dicaeidae

The flowerpeckers are very small, stout, often brightly coloured birds, with short tails, short thick curved bills and tubular tongues.

- Fire-breasted flowerpecker, Dicaeum ignipectus
- Scarlet-backed flowerpecker, Dicaeum cruentatum

== Sunbirds and spiderhunters ==
Order: Passeriformes Family: Nectariniidae

The sunbirds and spiderhunters are very small passerine birds which feed largely on nectar, although they will also take insects, especially when feeding young. Flight is fast and direct on their short wings. Most species can take nectar by hovering like a hummingbird, but usually perch to feed.

- Olive-backed sunbird, Cinnyris jugularis
- Fork-tailed sunbird, Aethopyga christinae

== Leafbirds ==
Order: Passeriformes Family: Chloropseidae

The leafbirds are small, bulbul-like birds. The males are brightly plumaged, usually in greens and yellows.

- Blue-winged leafbird, Chloropsis cochinchinensis (I)
- Orange-bellied leafbird, Chloropsis hardwickii

== Waxbills and allies ==
Order: Passeriformes Family: Estrildidae

The estrildid finches are small passerine birds of the Old World tropics and Australasia. They are gregarious and often colonial seed eaters with short, thick but pointed bills. They are all similar in structure and habits, but have wide variation in plumage colours and patterns.

- Scaly-breasted munia, Lonchura punctulata
- White-rumped munia, Lonchura striata
- Chestnut munia, Lonchura atricapilla

== Old World sparrows ==
Order: Passeriformes Family: Passeridae

Old World sparrows are small passerine birds. In general, sparrows tend to be small, plump, brown or grey birds with short tails and short powerful beaks. Sparrows are seed eaters, but they also consume small insects.

- Russet sparrow, Passer cinnamomeus
- Eurasian tree sparrow, Passer montanus

== Wagtails and pipits ==
Order: Passeriformes Family: Motacillidae

Motacillidae is a family of small passerine birds with medium to long tails. They include the wagtails, longclaws and pipits. They are slender, ground feeding insectivores of open country.

- Forest wagtail, Dendronanthus indicus (A)
- Gray wagtail, Motacilla cinerea
- Western yellow wagtail, Motacilla flava
- Eastern yellow wagtail, Motacilla tschutschensis
- Citrine wagtail, Motacilla citreola
- White wagtail, Motacilla alba
- Richard's pipit, Anthus richardi
- Olive-backed pipit, Anthus hodgsoni
- Red-throated pipit, Anthus cervinus (A)

== Finches, euphonias, and allies ==
Order: Passeriformes Family: Fringillidae

Finches are seed-eating passerine birds, that are small to moderately large and have a strong beak, usually conical and in some species very large. All have twelve tail feathers and nine primaries. These birds have a bouncing flight with alternating bouts of flapping and gliding on closed wings and most sing well.

- Yellow-billed grosbeak, Eophona migratoria
- Japanese grosbeak, Eophona personata
- Common rosefinch, Carpodacus erythrinus
- Brown bullfinch, Pyrrhula nipalensis
- Oriental greenfinch, Chloris sinica (A)
- Eurasian siskin, Spinus spinus

== Old World buntings ==
Order: Passeriformes Family: Emberizidae

The emberizids are a large family of passerine birds. They are seed-eating birds with distinctively shaped bills. Many emberizid species have distinctive head patterns.

- Crested bunting, Emberiza lathami
- Chestnut-eared bunting, Emberiza fucata
- Yellow-breasted bunting, Emberiza aureola
- Little bunting, Emberiza pusilla
- Yellow bunting, Emberiza sulphurata
- Black-faced bunting, Emberiza spodocephala
- Chestnut bunting, Emberiza rutila
- Yellow-browed bunting, Emberiza chrysophrys
- Tristram's bunting, Emberiza tristrami

== See also ==
- List of birds
- Lists of birds by region
- List of mammals of Macau
