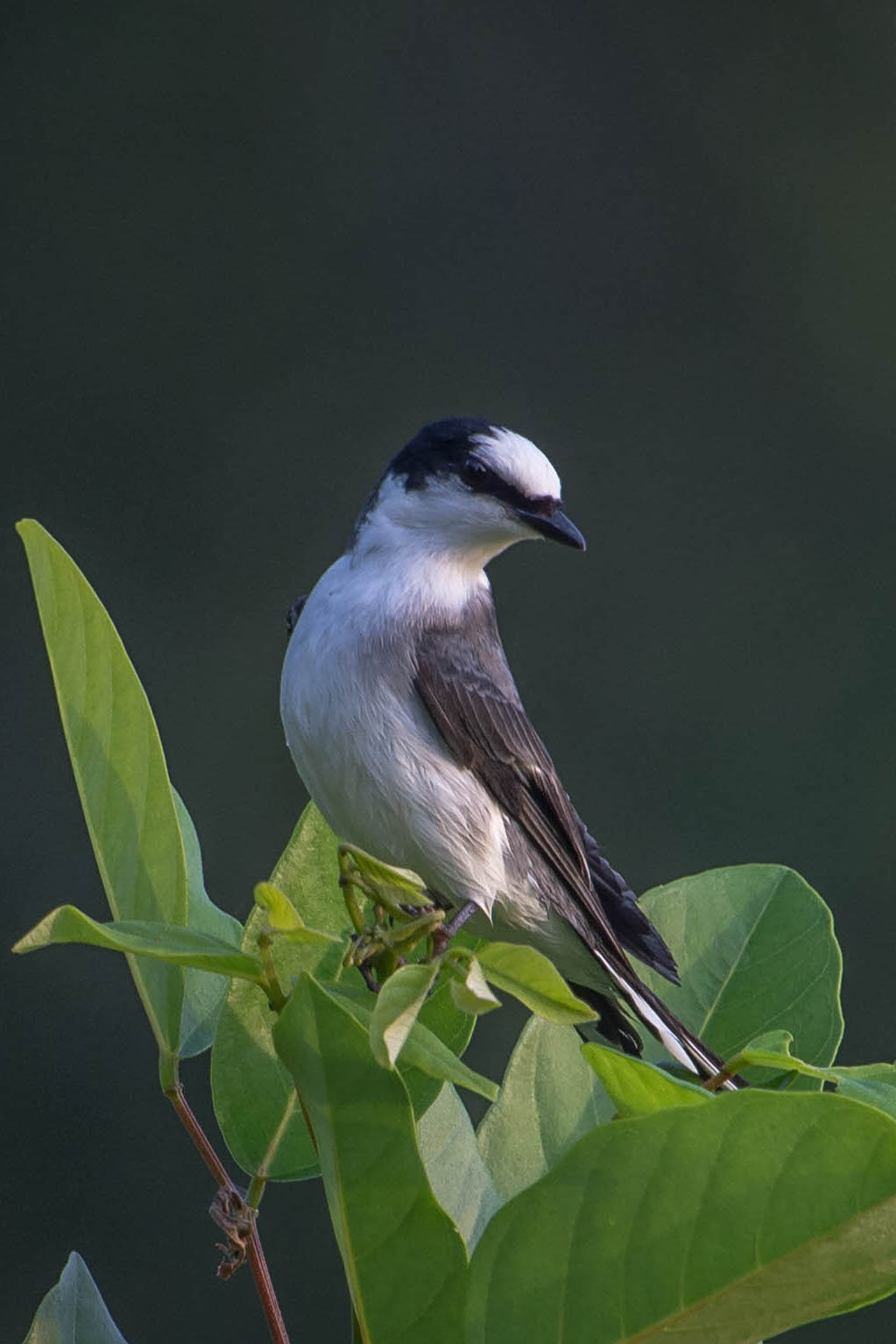

Conservation status
- Least Concern (IUCN 3.1)

Scientific classification
- Kingdom: Animalia
- Phylum: Chordata
- Class: Aves
- Order: Passeriformes
- Family: Campephagidae
- Genus: Pericrocotus
- Species: P. divaricatus

Binomial name
- Pericrocotus divaricatus (Raffles, 1822)

Synonyms
- Lanius divaricatus Raffles, 1822

= Ashy minivet =

Species of bird

The ashy minivet (Pericrocotus divaricatus) is a passerine bird of eastern Asia belonging to the minivet genus Pericrocotus in the cuckooshrike family Campephagidae. While most of the minivets have shades of yellow, orange and red in their plumage, this species has only greys, whites and blacks. The male is distinctive with a white face and black nape although females can be confused with the female of the brown-rumped minivet. They forage in the canopy, often along with other minivets and join mixed-species foraging flocks.

== Description ==
Patterning of the male

It is 18.5–20 cm long. The male is grey above and whitish below. It has a black cap with a white forehead and there is a white band across the flight-feathers. The outer tail feathers are white. The bill and feet are black. The female's cap is grey apart from a black band between the bill and eye and a narrow white band above it. The call is a high-pitched, metallic trill. It is considered as closely related to Pericrocotus roseus and Pericrocotus cantonensis but differs in moult pattern. It is one of the few passerine birds that moult their primaries twice in a year and is the longest distance migrant among the minivets.

It breeds in south-east Siberia, north-east China, Korea and Japan. Birds in the Ryūkyū Islands of southern Japan are commonly considered to be a separate species—Ryukyu minivet (P. tegimae). The ashy minivet is a long distance migrant, wintering in South and South-east Asia as far south as Sumatra, Borneo and the Philippines as well as from Sri Lanka, first recorded in Northern parts in January 2026. It is found in forest as well as in more open areas with scattered trees. It forages in the tree canopy for insects sometimes joining mixed-species foraging flocks. Migrant birds can often be seen in large flocks.

The status of the species is considered to be secure and is considered as a "least concern" species by the IUCN. Populations of the species on the Amami Island was found to have increased from 1985–2001.

In the South Asian region, they are considered rare. They were first noted on the Indian mainland only in 1965 although they had been reported in 1897 from the Andaman Islands. It has since been reported with greater regularity.

Four to seven eggs are laid. These are incubated for 17 to 18 days.
