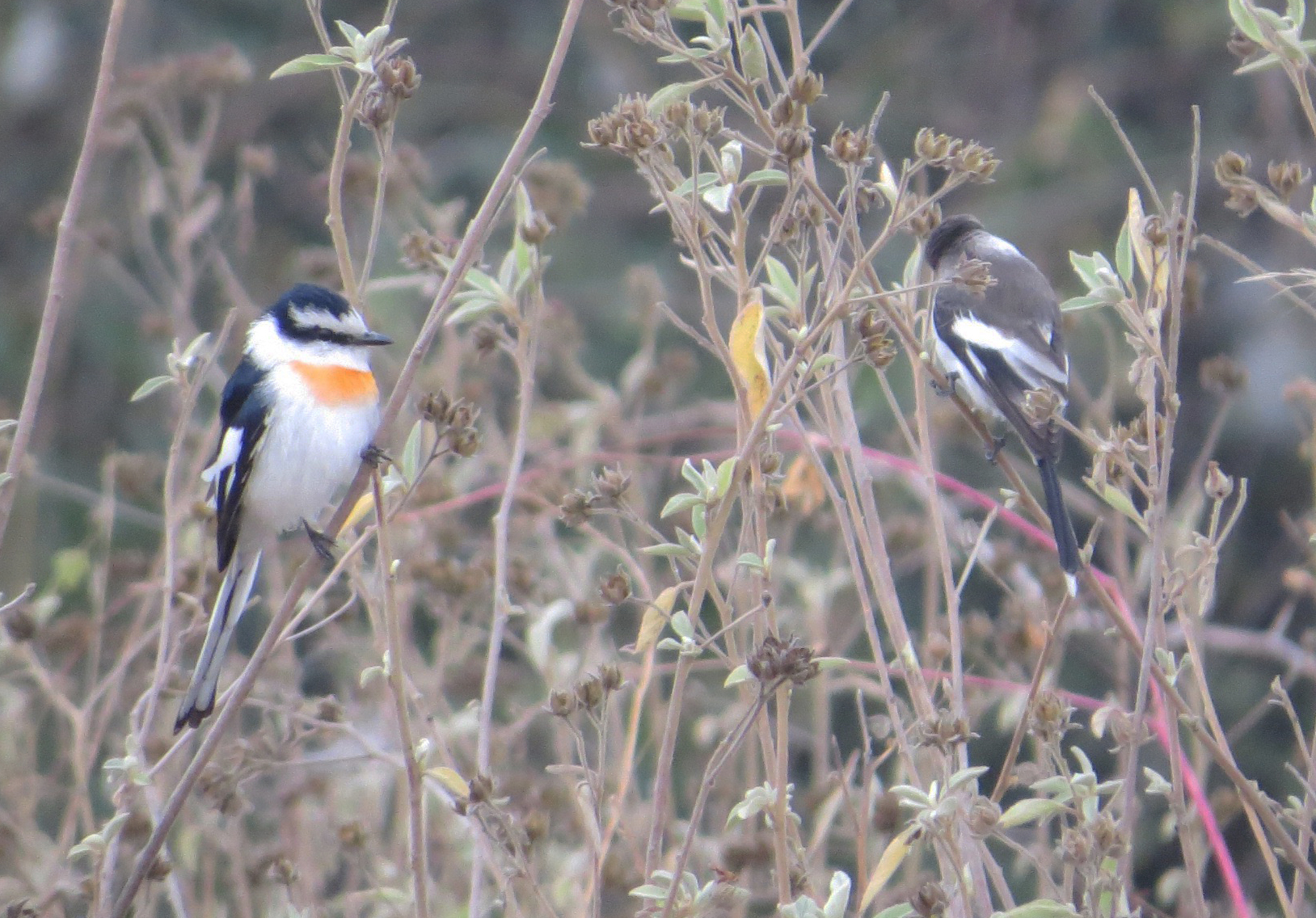

Conservation status
- Near Threatened (IUCN 3.1)

Scientific classification
- Kingdom: Animalia
- Phylum: Chordata
- Class: Aves
- Order: Passeriformes
- Family: Campephagidae
- Genus: Pericrocotus
- Species: P. albifrons

Binomial name
- Pericrocotus albifrons Jerdon, 1862

= Jerdon's minivet =

Species of bird

Jerdon's minivet (Pericrocotus albifrons) is a species of minivet found in Myanmar, mostly in dry deciduous forest. It is sometimes considered conspecific with the white-bellied minivet.
