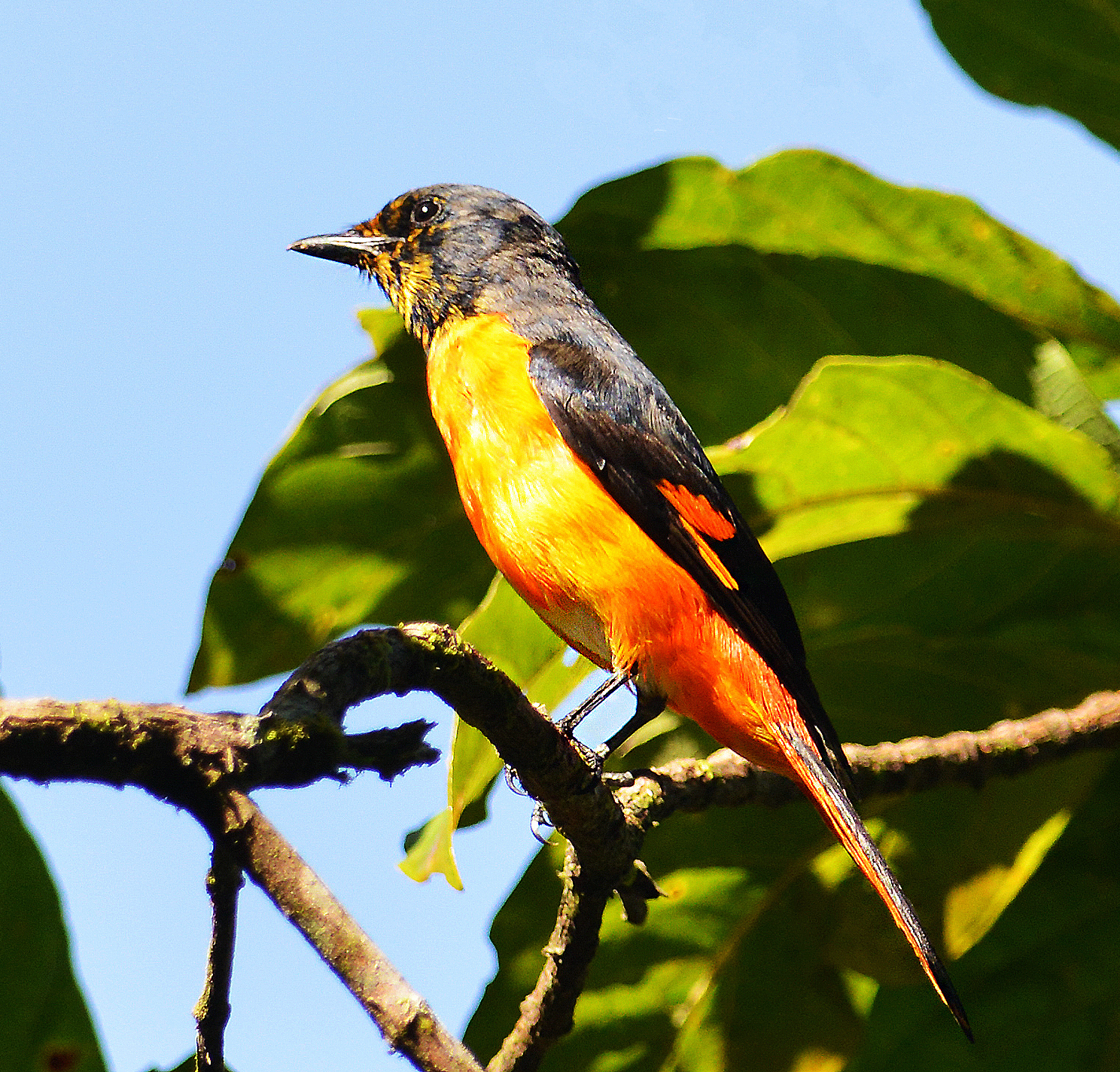
- Male
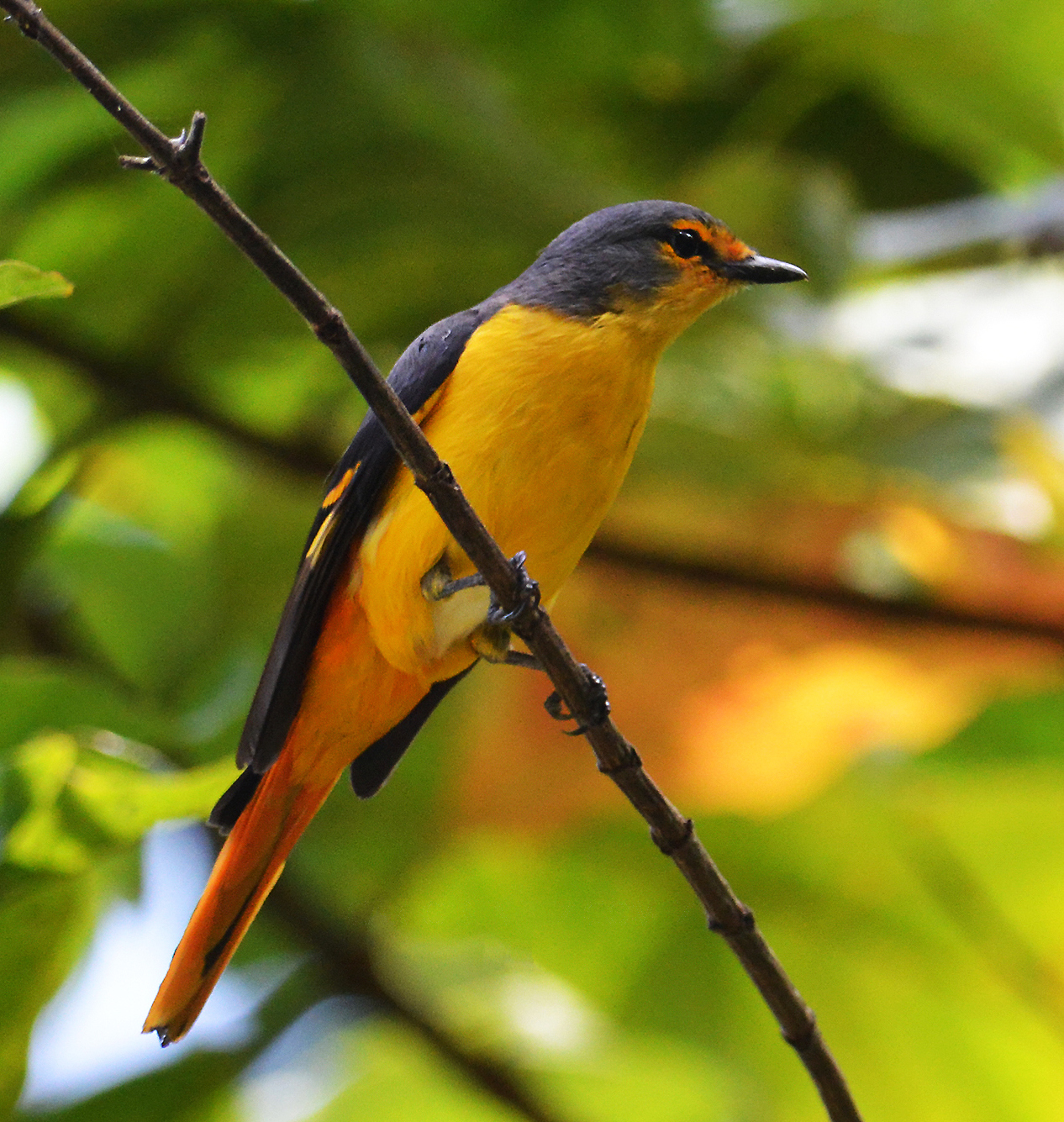
- Female

Conservation status
- Near Threatened (IUCN 3.1)

Scientific classification
- Kingdom: Animalia
- Phylum: Chordata
- Class: Aves
- Order: Passeriformes
- Family: Campephagidae
- Genus: Pericrocotus
- Species: P. igneus

Binomial name
- Pericrocotus igneus Blyth, 1846

= Fiery minivet =

Species of bird

The fiery minivet (Pericrocotus igneus) is a species of bird in the family Campephagidae. Its range includes Thailand, Malaysia, Indonesia and the Philippines. Its natural habitats are broadleaf, secondary and coastal forests. It is threatened by forest clearance and has been assessed as near-threatened by the International Union for Conservation of Nature (IUCN).

== Taxonomy ==
This species was described from Malacca by Edward Blyth in 1846. The species name is from the Latin igneus "fiery". Harry C. Oberholser described the larger subspecies Pericrocotus igneus trophis from Simeulue in 1912. A 2010 molecular phylogenetic study confirmed the previously hypothesised relationship that the fiery minivet and small minivet (Pericrocotus cinnamomeus) are sister species.

== Description ==
The fiery minivet is 15–16.5 cm (5.9–6.5 in) long. It is sexually dimorphic. The male has a glossy black head and mantle and an orange-red back. The wings are mostly glossy black, with orange-red edges to the secondary coverts and an orange-red patch on the flight feathers. The gradated tail is black and orange-red. The chin and throat are glossy black, and the rest of the underparts is orange-red. The eyes are dark brown, and the beak and feet are black. The female has a grey head, with orange lores and eye-rims. The back is lead grey, and the rump is orange-red. The wings are darker grey, and the wing-patch is paler than the male's. The underparts are yellow. The juvenile bird has sooty brown upperparts and sooty black flight feathers. The underparts are off-white from the chin to upper belly, the rest being pale yellow. After a post-juvenile moult, it becomes similar to the adult female.

== Distribution and habitat ==
This species is found in Tenasserim, the Thai-Malay Peninsula, Sumatra and its satellite islands, Borneo and Palawan. It is locally extinct in Singapore. It lives in the canopy of lowland broadleaf forest, forest edges, peat swamp forest, well-grown secondary forest, and coastal and mangrove forest. It is found up to 1,200 m (3,900 ft) in elevation, mainly below 600 m (2,000 ft). It sometimes visits wooded gardens near forests.

== Behaviour ==
This minivet occurs in groups and also joins mixed-species foraging flocks. Its contact call is a swee-eet or twee-eet. It catches insects in the air and from leaves and branches. Breeding has been observed from May to July. The shallow cup nest is built on a fork of a tree from twigs and fibres and camouflaged with lichen and pieces of bark. The eggs are pale yellowish, with brown and grey marks. Moulting has been recorded from June to September.

== Status ==
Deforestation due to logging and land conversion has likely caused the population to decline at a moderate speed. Forest fires are also a threat, such as in 1997 and 1998. The IUCN has assessed it as a near-threatened species.
