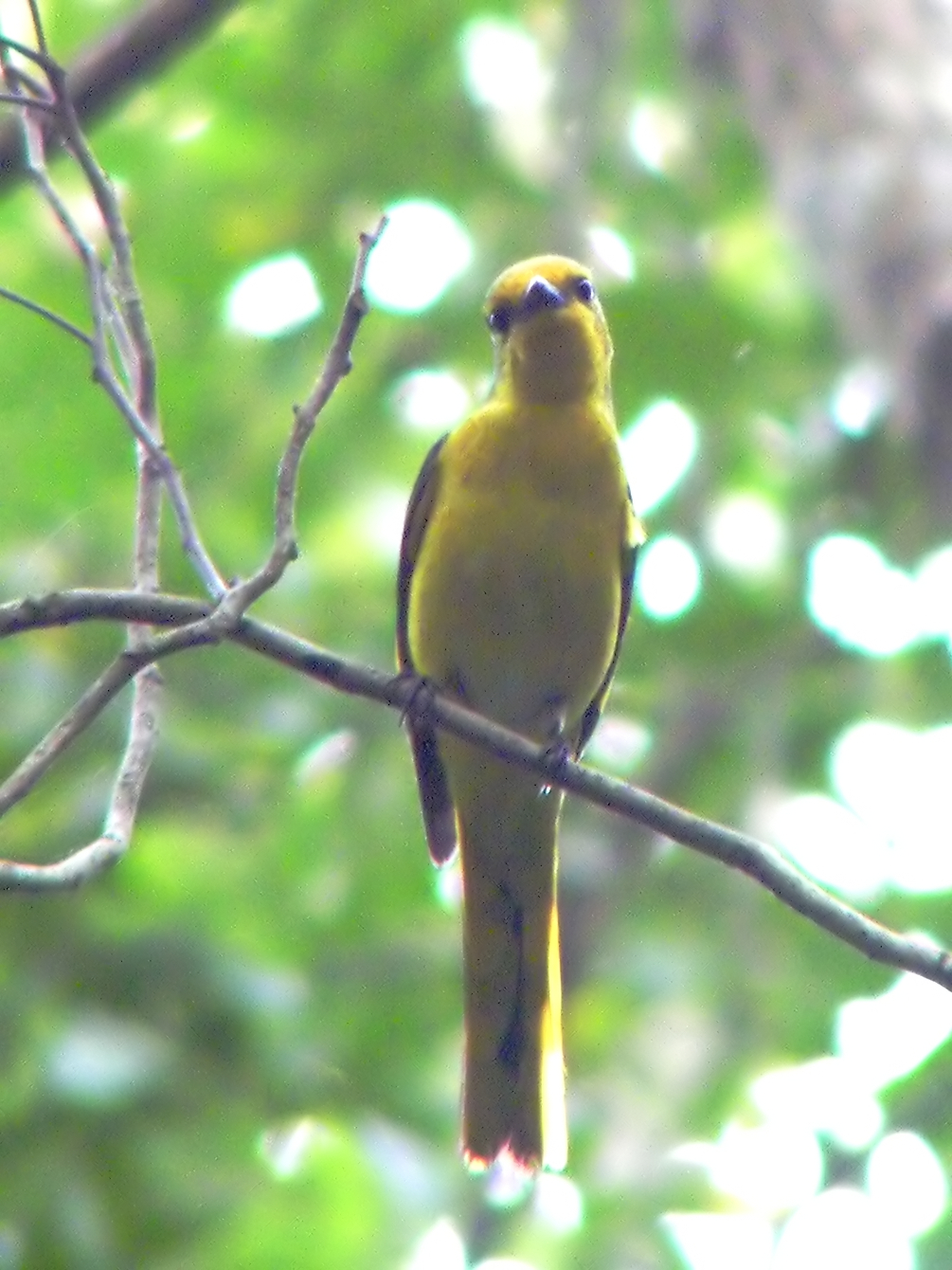
- Female scarlet minivet (P. flammeus)

Scientific classification
- Kingdom: Animalia
- Phylum: Chordata
- Class: Aves
- Order: Passeriformes
- Family: Campephagidae
- Genus: Pericrocotus; Boie, 1826

Type species
- Muscicapa miniata Temminck, 1822

Species
- See text.

= Minivet =

Minivets

Genus of birds

The minivets are passerine birds belonging to the genus Pericrocotus in the cuckooshrike family Campephagidae. There are about 15 species, occurring mainly in forests in southern and eastern Asia. They are fairly small, slender birds with long tails and an erect posture. Most species have bright red or yellow markings. All species show sexual dichromatism with the male usually having more brightly coloured plumage. They feed mainly on insects, foraging in groups in the tree canopy.

== Taxonomy ==
The genus Pericrocotus was introduced in 1826 by the German zoologist Friedrich Boie with Muscicapa miniata Temminck, the Sunda minivet, as the type species. The genus name combines the Ancient Greek περι/peri meaning "very" or "all around" with κροκωτος/krokōtos meaning "golden-yellow" from κροκος/krokos meaning "saffron".

== Species list ==
The genus contains 15 species:

- White-bellied minivet, Pericrocotus erythropygius – India
- Jerdon's minivet, Pericrocotus albifrons – central Myanmar
- Fiery minivet, Pericrocotus igneus – Malay Peninsula, Sumatra, Borneo and Palawan (southwest Philippines)
- Small minivet, Pericrocotus cinnamomeus – Pakistan, India and Sri Lanka to Vietnam and north Malay Peninsula; disjunctly Java and Bali
- Grey-chinned minivet, Pericrocotus solaris – Himalayas from central west Nepal to east China, Taiwan, Vietnam, Sumatra and Borneo
- Sunda minivet, Pericrocotus miniatus – montane Sumatra and Java
- Short-billed minivet, Pericrocotus brevirostris – Himalayas to Laos
- Little minivet, Pericrocotus lansbergei – Sumbawa and Flores (west, central Lesser Sunda Islands)
- Long-tailed minivet, Pericrocotus ethologus – Himalayas to Laos
- Orange minivet, Pericrocotus flammeus – southwest India and Sri Lanka
- Scarlet minivet, Pericrocotus speciosus – Himalayas to Indonesia, Philippines
- Ashy minivet, Pericrocotus divaricatus – southeast Siberia, northeast China, Korea Peninsula and Japan (main island)
- Ryukyu minivet, Pericrocotus tegimae – Ryukyu Islands, expanding north to Honshu (central, south Japan)
- Swinhoe's minivet, Pericrocotus cantonensis – central, southeast China
- Rosy minivet, Pericrocotus roseus – Himalayas to south China, Myanmar and northwest Vietnam
