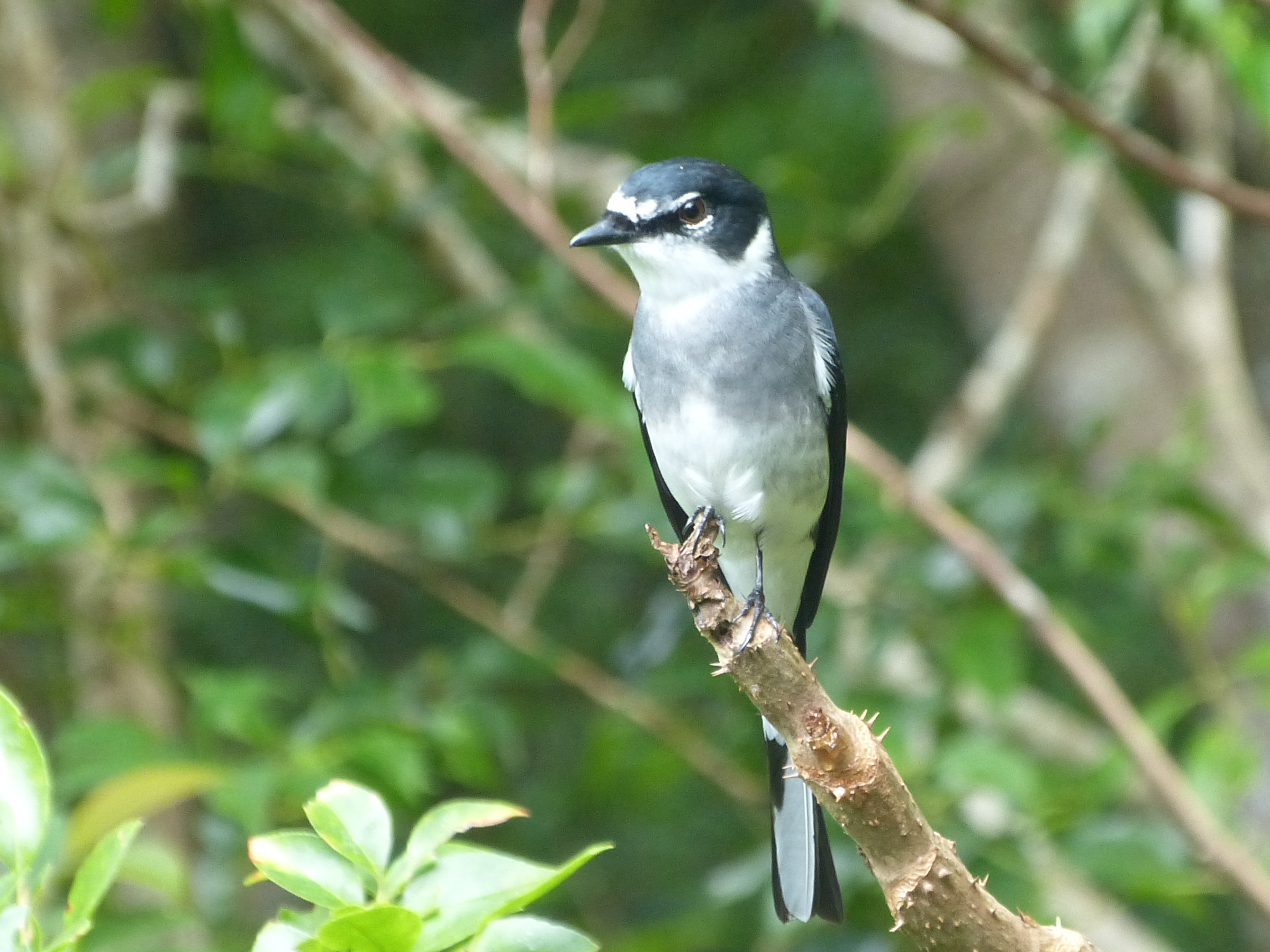

Conservation status
- Least Concern (IUCN 3.1)

Scientific classification
- Kingdom: Animalia
- Phylum: Chordata
- Class: Aves
- Order: Passeriformes
- Family: Campephagidae
- Genus: Pericrocotus
- Species: P. tegimae

Binomial name
- Pericrocotus tegimae Stejneger, 1887

= Ryukyu minivet =

Species of bird

The Ryukyu minivet (Pericrocotus tegimae) is a species of bird in the family Campephagidae. It is endemic to Japan. The species was previously thought to be a subspecies of the ashy minivet. Its specific name is named for the Japanese naturalist Seiichi Tegima.

== Distribution and habitat ==
The Ryukyu minivet was originally endemic to the Ryukyu Islands of Japan, but in the 1970s it spread to southern Kyushu and as of 2010 was found throughout that island and into Shikoku and western Honshu. It has been suggested that the species was able to spread due to declines in the related ashy minivet. Also found on the island of Jeju (South Korea) in 2024.

The species' natural habitat is evergreen and mixed deciduous forests. It will also use human-modified habitats, including cedar plantations and gardens. It ranges from sea-level to 1,700 m (5,600 ft).
