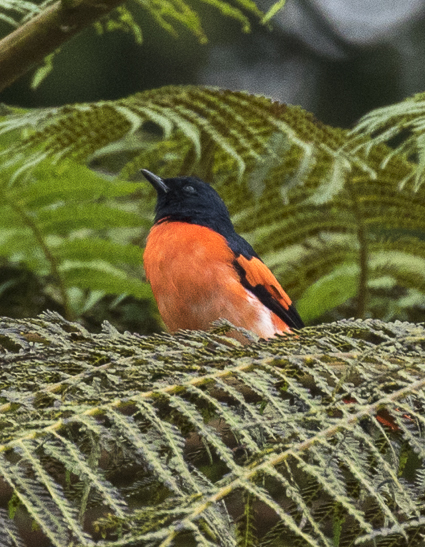

Conservation status
- Least Concern (IUCN 3.1)

Scientific classification
- Kingdom: Animalia
- Phylum: Chordata
- Class: Aves
- Order: Passeriformes
- Family: Campephagidae
- Genus: Pericrocotus
- Species: P. miniatus

Binomial name
- Pericrocotus miniatus (Temminck, 1822)

= Sunda minivet =

Species of bird

The Sunda minivet (Pericrocotus miniatus) is a species of bird in the family Campephagidae. It is endemic to Indonesia, where it occurs on secondary forests of Sumatra and Java.

== Gallery ==
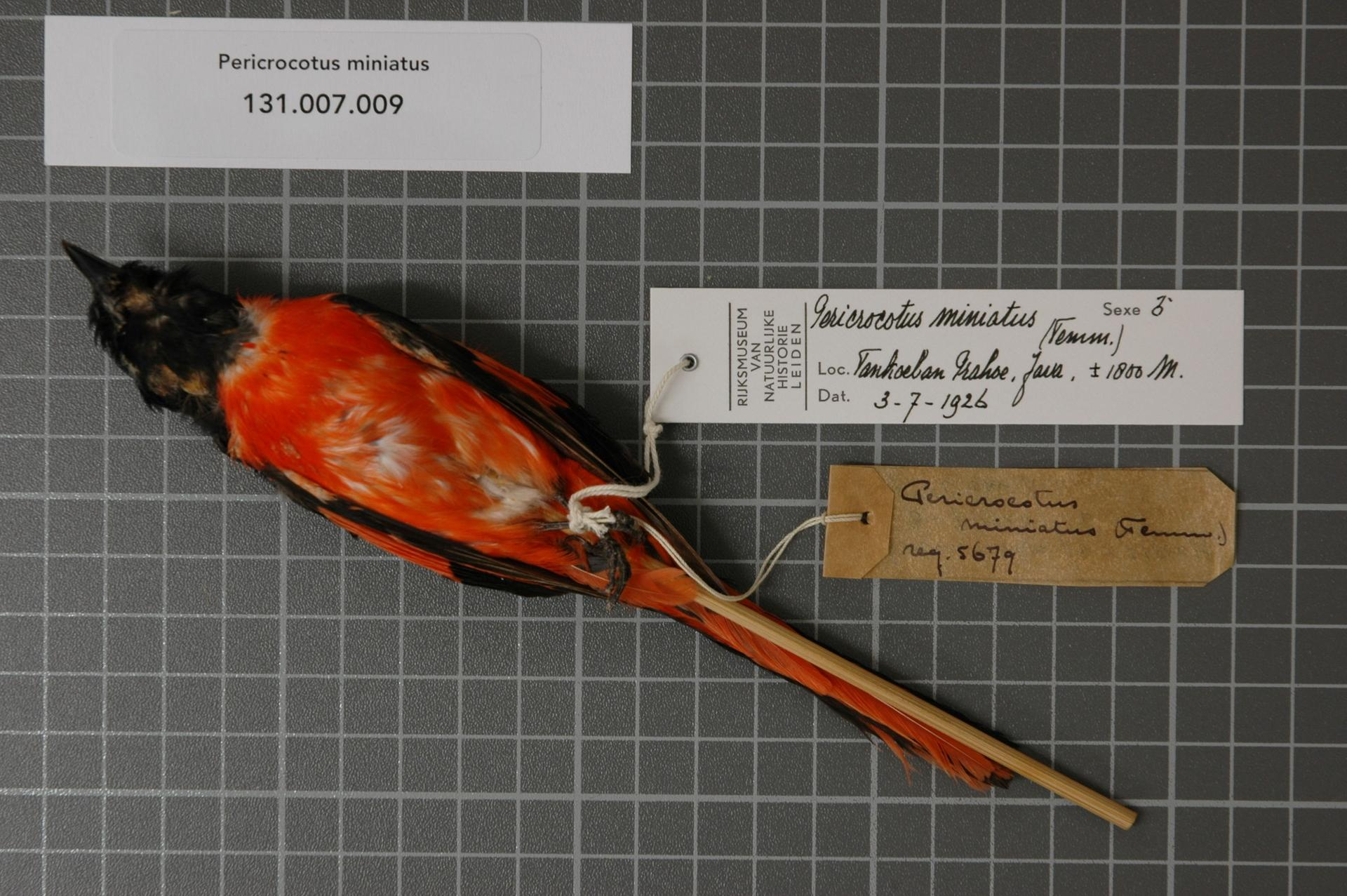
Male Pericrocotus miniatus (Temminck, 1822), museum specimens Naturalis

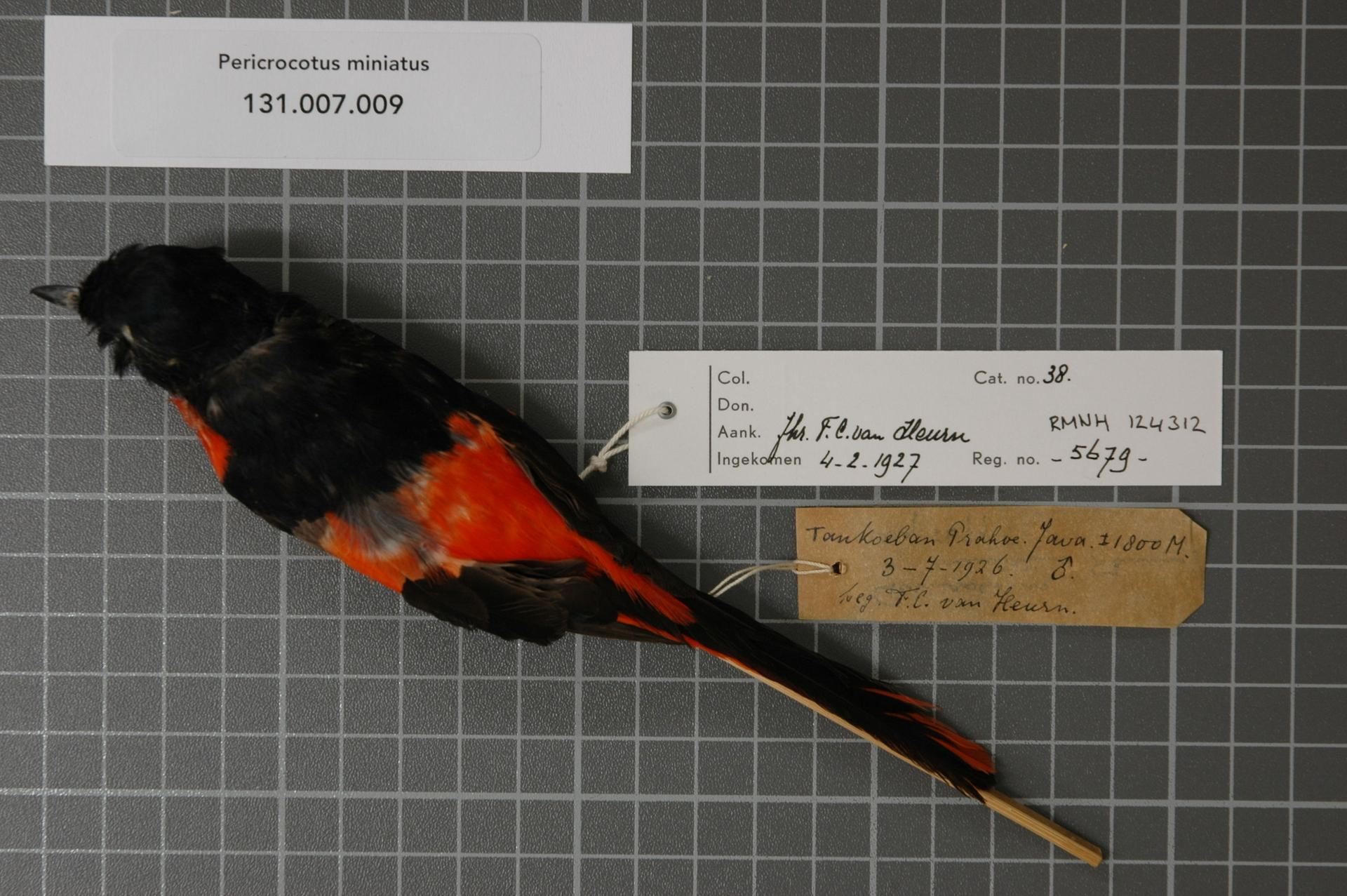
Same male Pericrocotus miniatus (Temminck, 1822), other view
