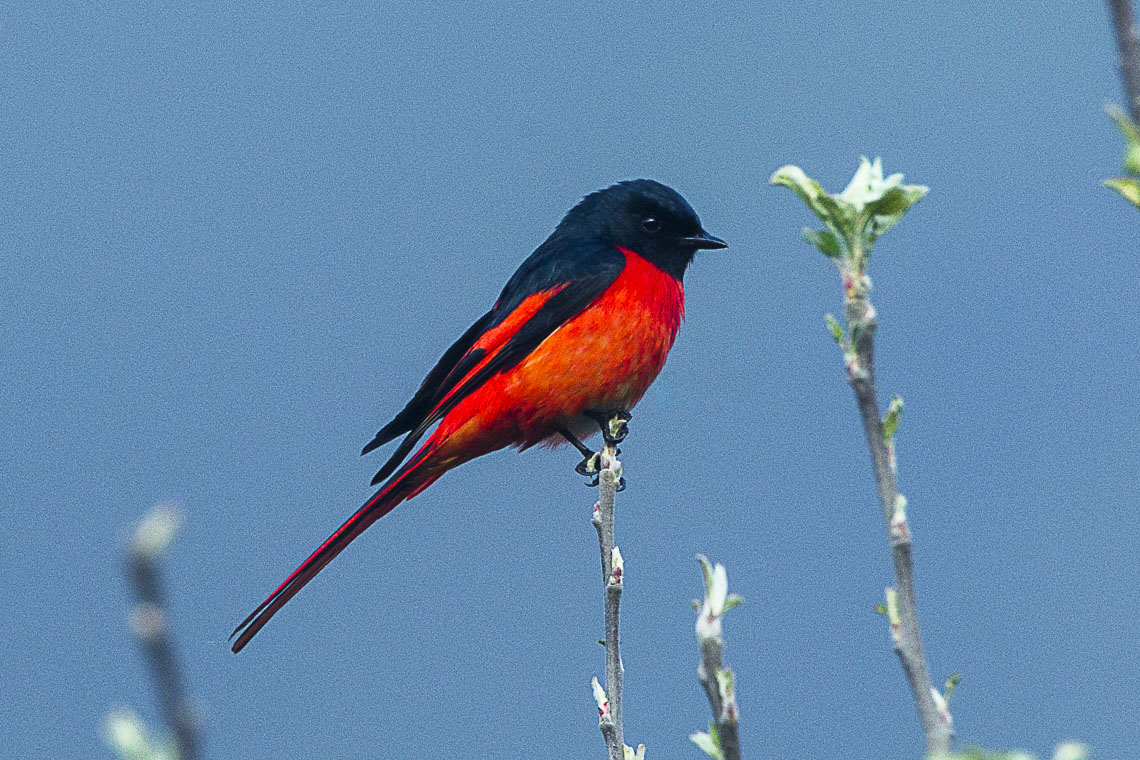
- male
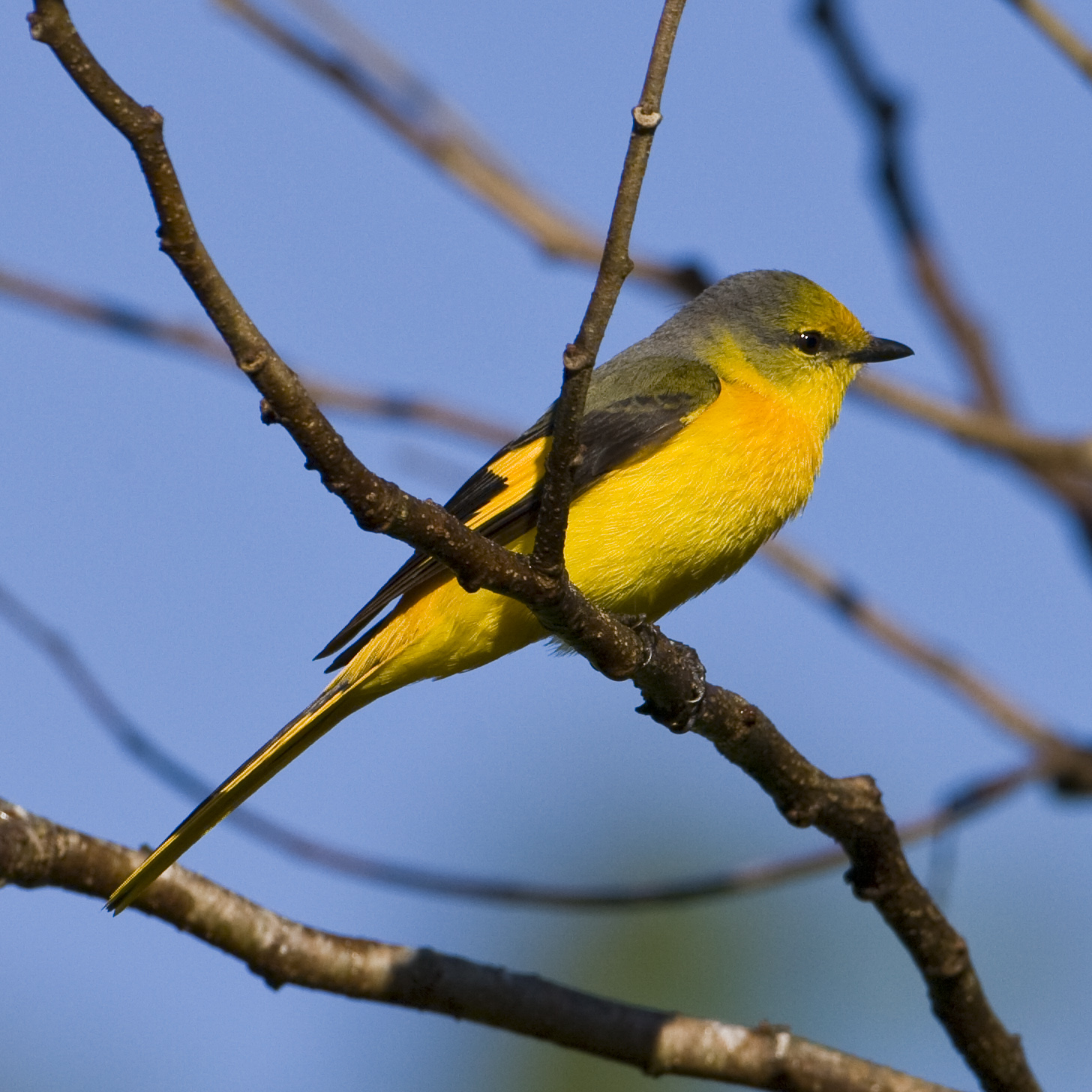
- female

Conservation status
- Least Concern (IUCN 3.1)

Scientific classification
- Kingdom: Animalia
- Phylum: Chordata
- Class: Aves
- Order: Passeriformes
- Family: Campephagidae
- Genus: Pericrocotus
- Species: P. brevirostris

Binomial name
- Pericrocotus brevirostris (Vigors, 1831)

Synonyms
- Muscipeta brevirostris Vigors, 1831

= Short-billed minivet =

Species of bird

The short-billed minivet (Pericrocotus brevirostris) is a species of bird in the family Campephagidae. It is found in Bangladesh, Bhutan, Cambodia, China, India, Laos, Myanmar, Nepal, Thailand, and Vietnam. Its natural habitats are subtropical or tropical moist lowland forest and subtropical or tropical moist montane forest.
