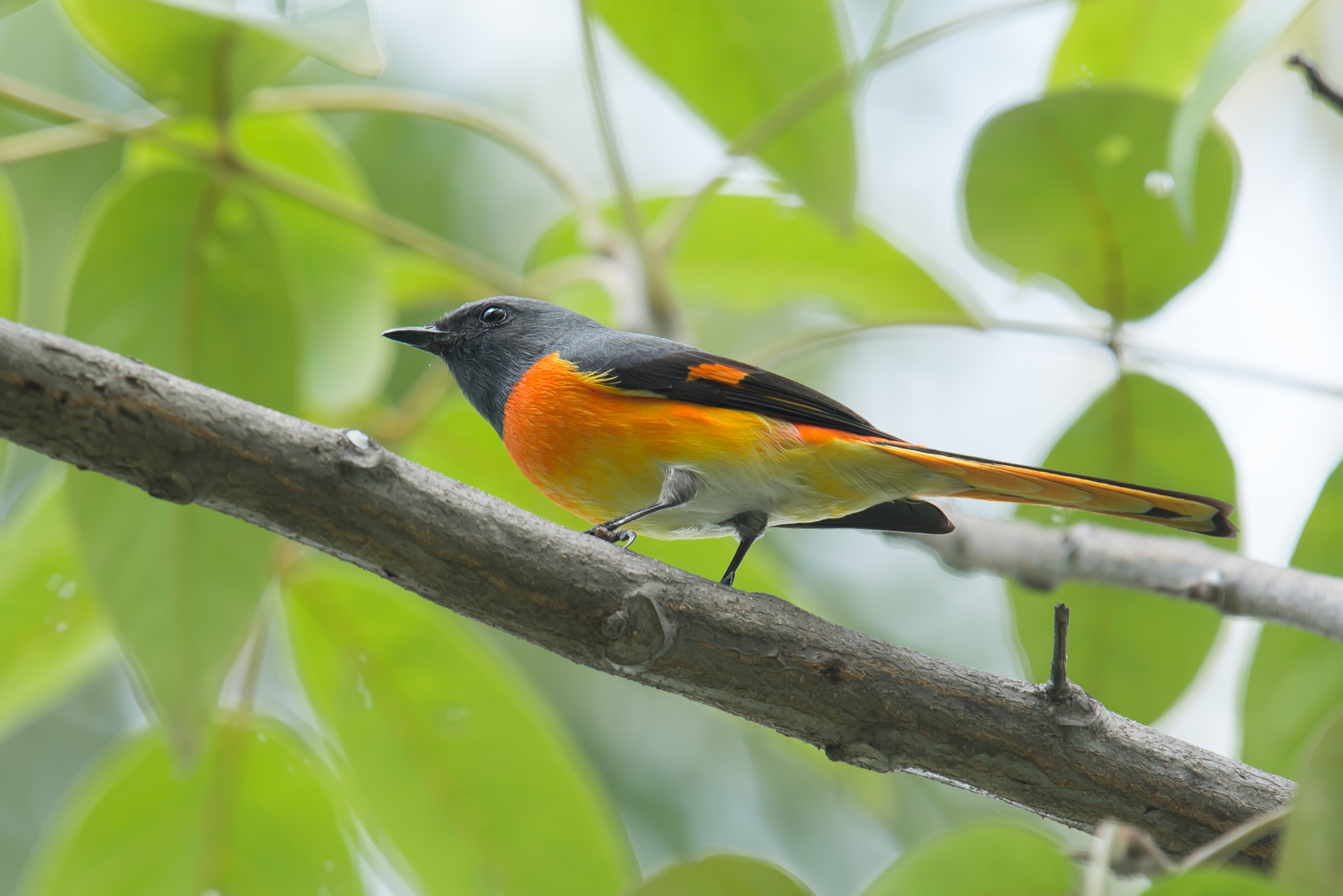
- a small minivet in Thailand

Conservation status
- Least Concern (IUCN 3.1)

Scientific classification
- Kingdom: Animalia
- Phylum: Chordata
- Class: Aves
- Order: Passeriformes
- Family: Campephagidae
- Genus: Pericrocotus
- Species: P. cinnamomeus

Binomial name
- Pericrocotus cinnamomeus (Linnaeus, 1766)

Synonyms
- Motacilla cinnamomea Linnaeus, 1766

= Small minivet =

Species of bird

The small minivet (Pericrocotus cinnamomeus) is a small passerine bird. This minivet is found in tropical southern Asia from the Indian subcontinent east to Indonesia.

== Description ==
The small minivet is 16 cm long with a strong dark beak and long wings. The male differs from most other common minivets by having grey, not glossy black, upperparts and head, and orange underparts, fading to yellow on the belly, orange tail edges, rump and wing patches.

The female is grey above, with yellow underparts (including the face), tail edges, rump and wing patches.

There is much racial variation. The male P. c. pallidus of the northwest Indian subcontinent is pale grey above, with the underparts whitish except on the throat and flanks, whereas the male P. c. malabaricus of peninsular and southern India is darker above, has more extensive scarlet below. The female of the southern race is also brighter yellow below.

== Behaviour ==
The small minivet is a widespread and common resident breeding bird in thorn jungle and scrub. The nest is a cup-like structure into which two to four spotted eggs are laid and incubated by the female.

This minivet catches insects in trees by flycatching or while perched. The small minivet will form small flocks. Its call is a high, thin swee swee swee.

== Gallery ==
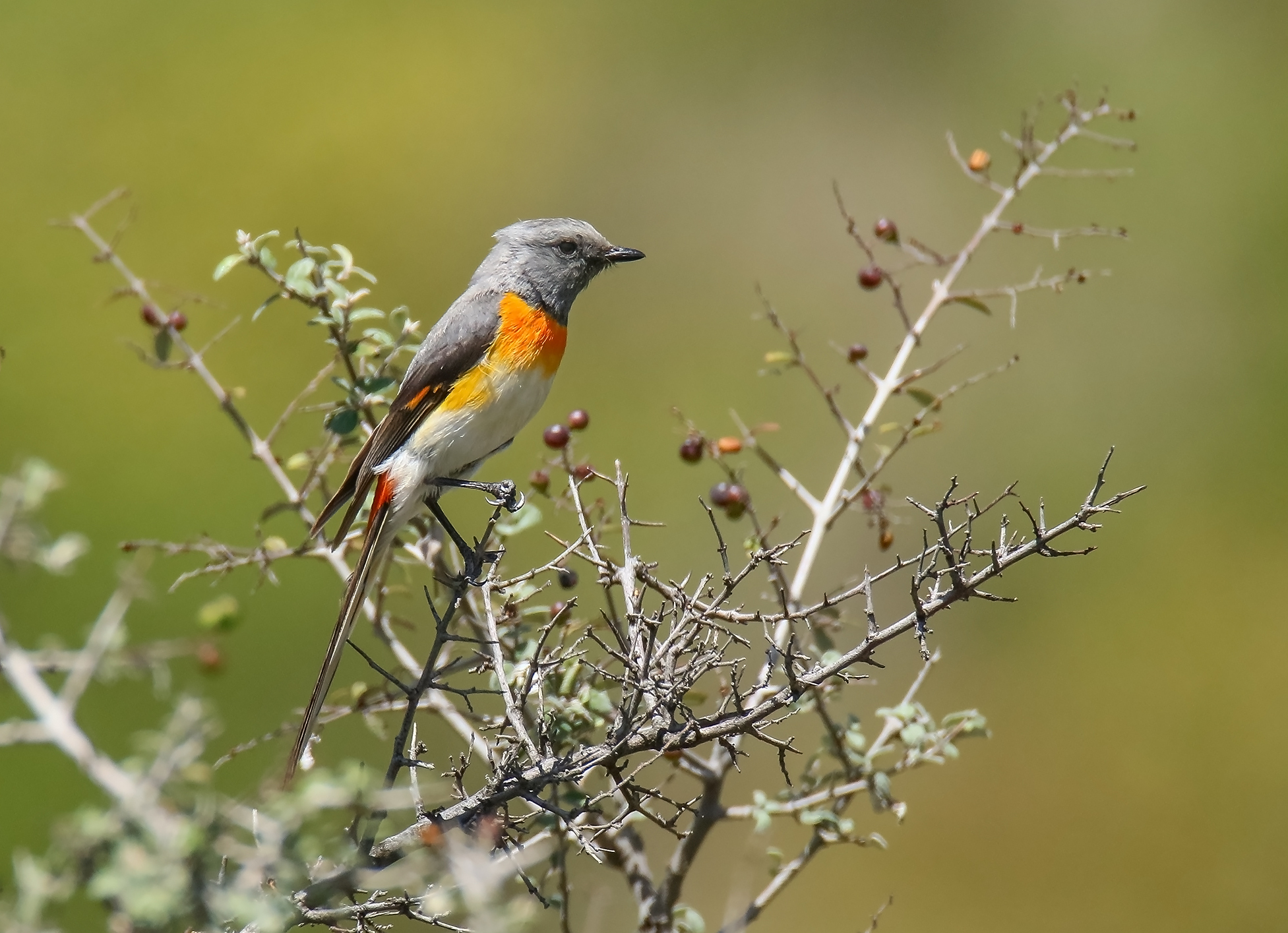
P. c. pallidus in Pakistan

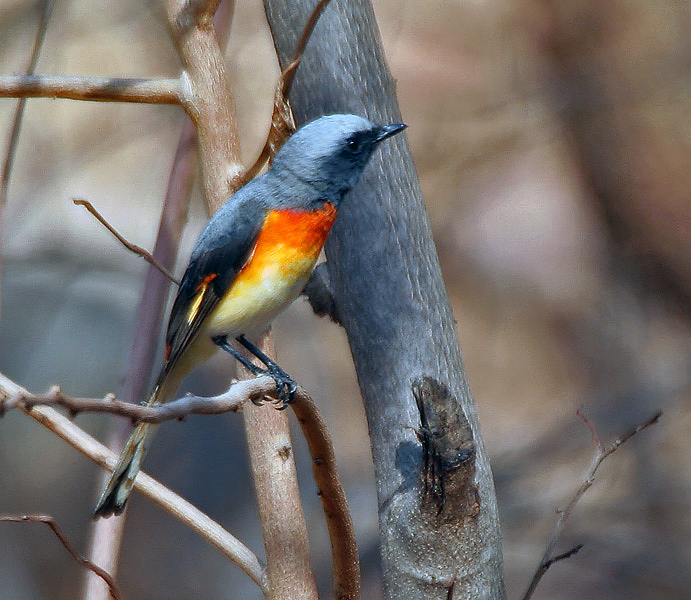
P. c. malabaricus India

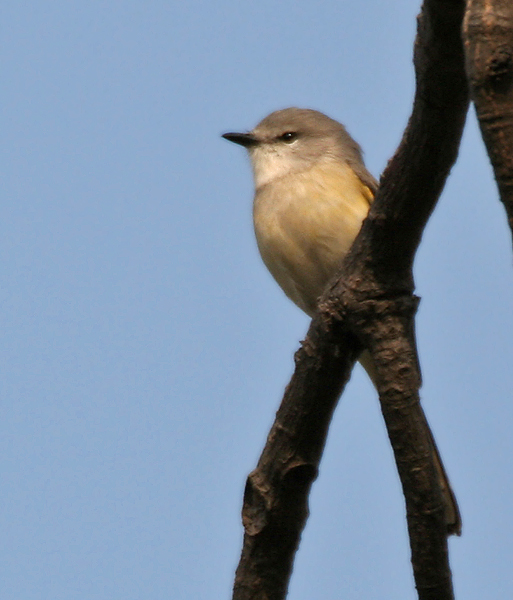
Female P. c. malabaricus in India

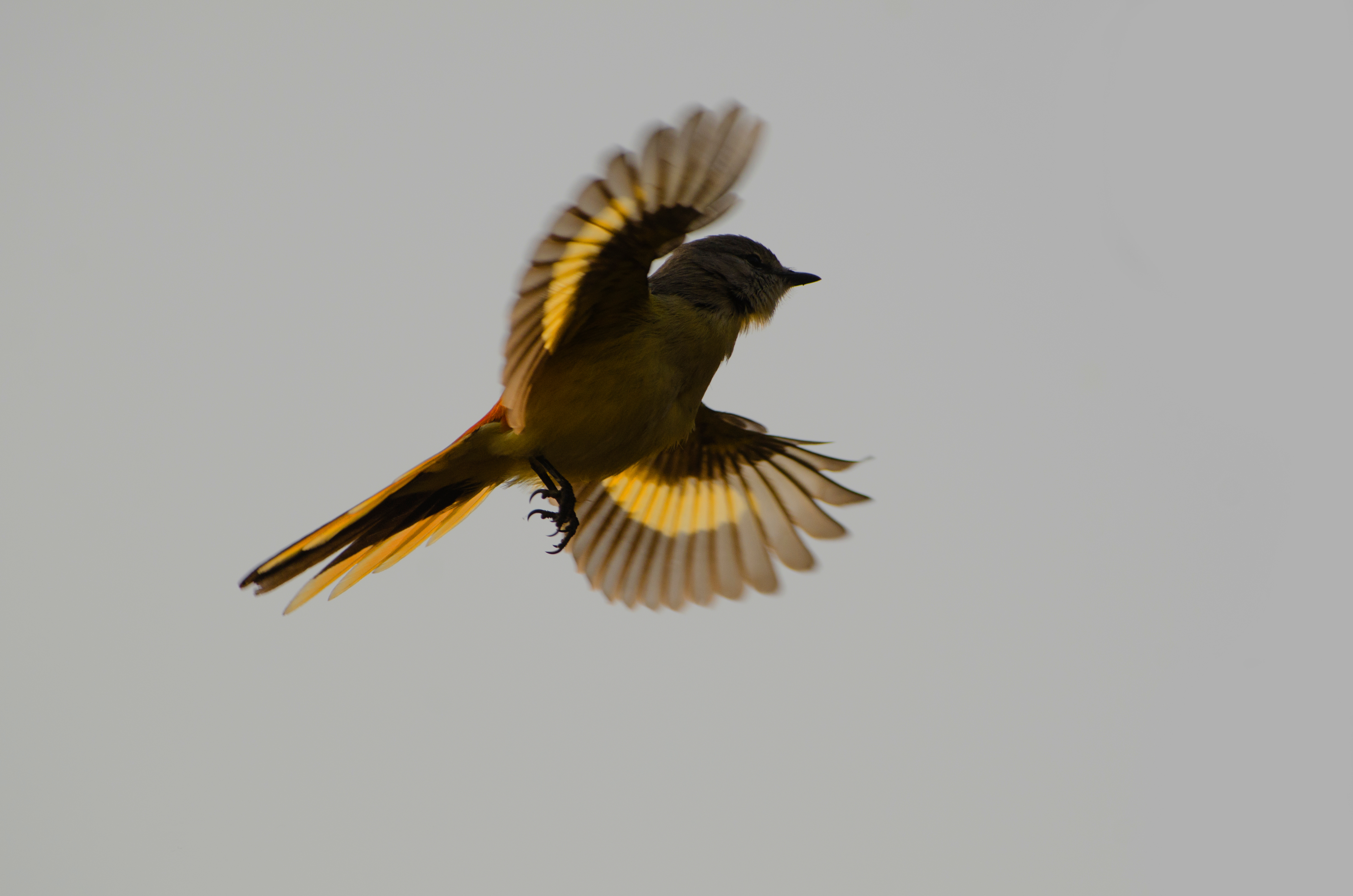
Female in flight

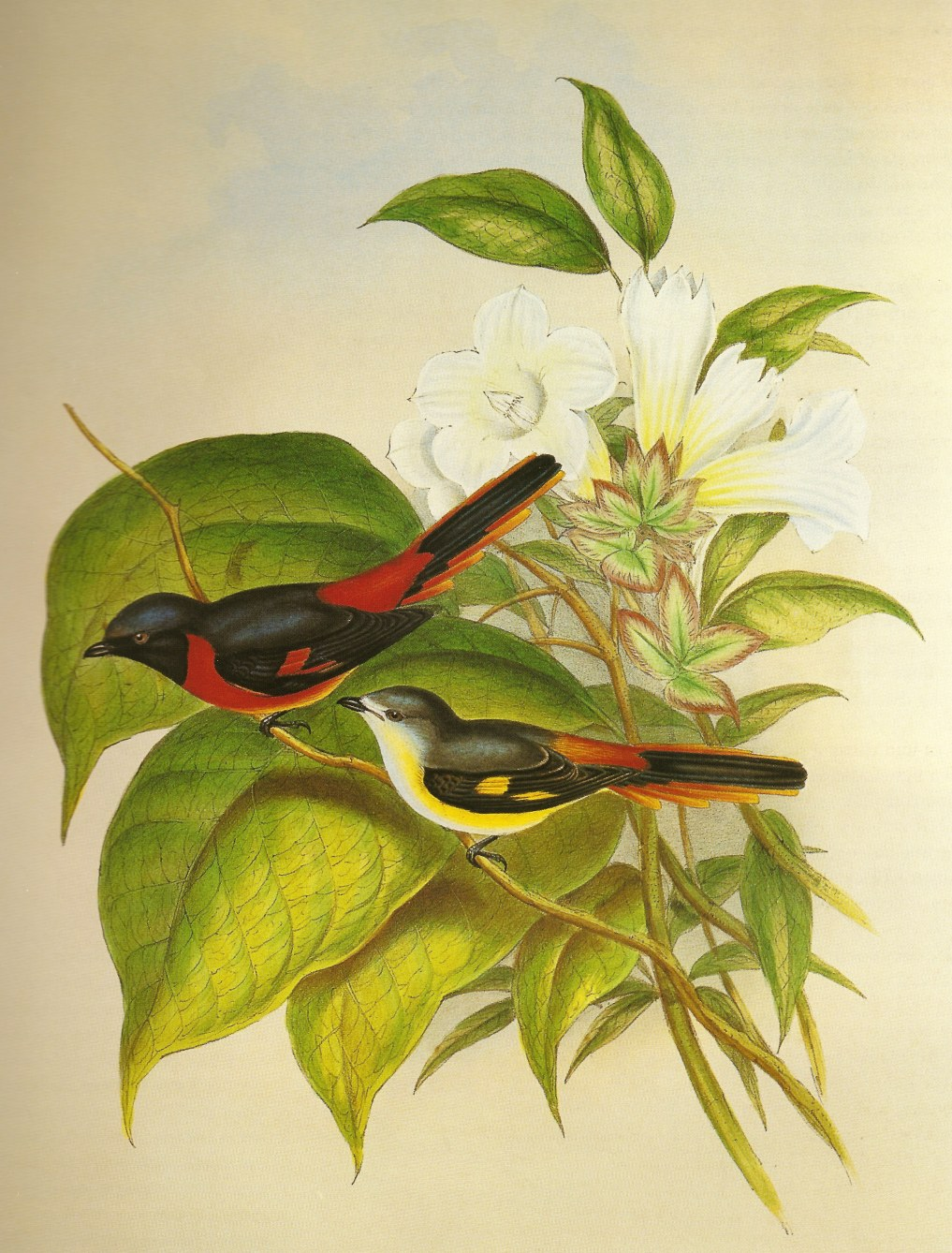
Illustration
