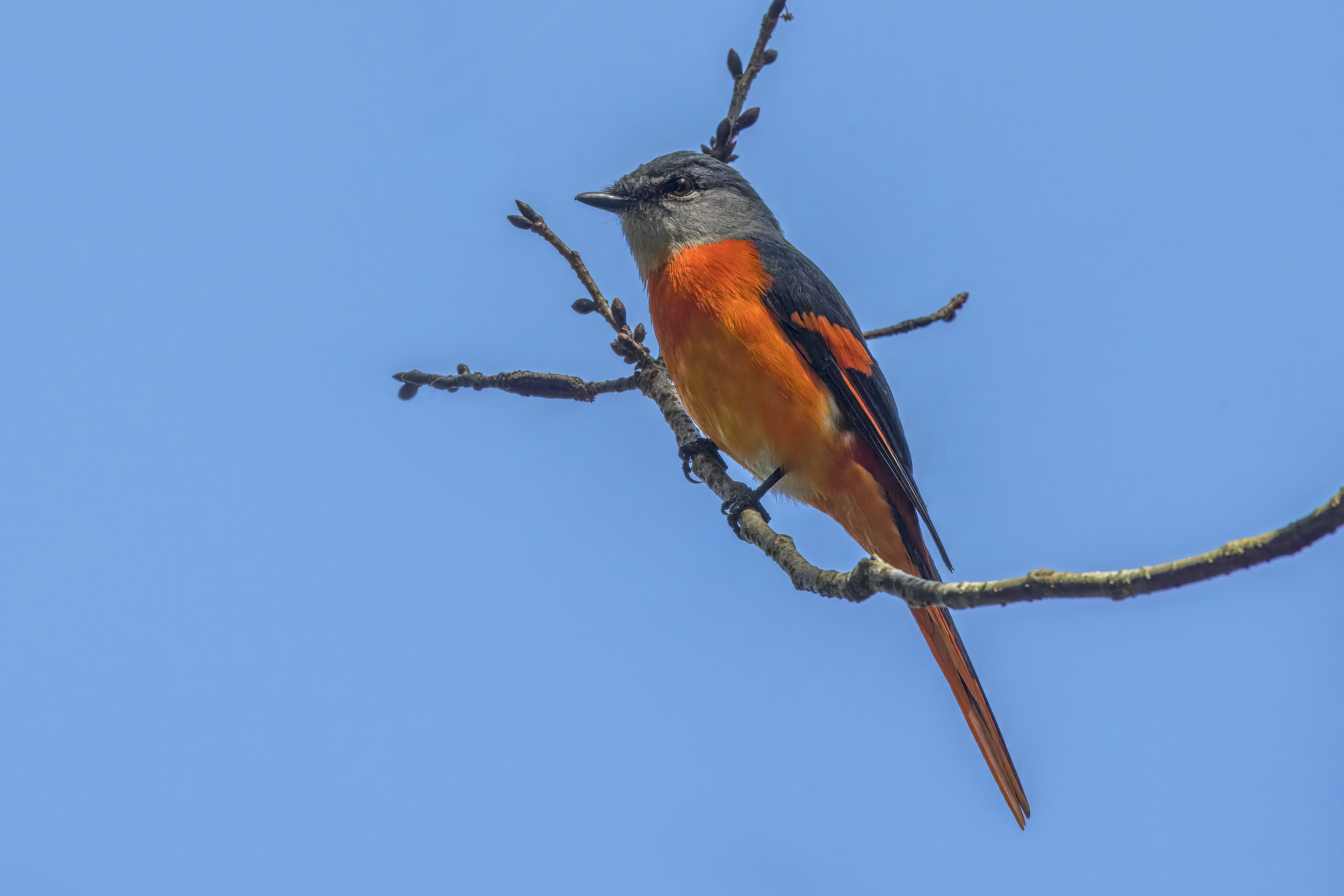
- Pericrocotus solaris griseogularis, Taiwan

Conservation status
- Least Concern (IUCN 3.1)

Scientific classification
- Kingdom: Animalia
- Phylum: Chordata
- Class: Aves
- Order: Passeriformes
- Family: Campephagidae
- Genus: Pericrocotus
- Species: P. solaris

Binomial name
- Pericrocotus solaris Blyth, 1846

= Grey-chinned minivet =

Species of bird

The grey-chinned minivet (Pericrocotus solaris) is a species of bird in the family Campephagidae. It is found from the Himalayas to China, Taiwan and Southeast Asia. Its natural habitat is forests about 1,000–2,000 m (3,300–6,600 ft) in elevation. The International Union for Conservation of Nature (IUCN) has assessed it as a least-concern species.

== Taxonomy ==
This species was described from Darjeeling by Edward Blyth in 1846. The IOC World Bird List recognises eight subspecies: Pericrocotus solaris solaris found in the Himalayas and northern and western Myanmar; P. s. rubrolimbatus in eastern Myanmar and northern Thailand; P. s. montpellieri in southern China; P. s. griseogularis in southeastern China, Taiwan, northeastern Laos and northern Vietnam; P. s. deignani in southern Laos and central Vietnam; P. s. nassovicus in eastern Thailand and southern Cambodia; P. s. montanus in western Malaysia and Sumatra; and P. s. cinereigula in Borneo. The Handbook of the Birds of the World considers that montanus and cinereigula form a separate species.

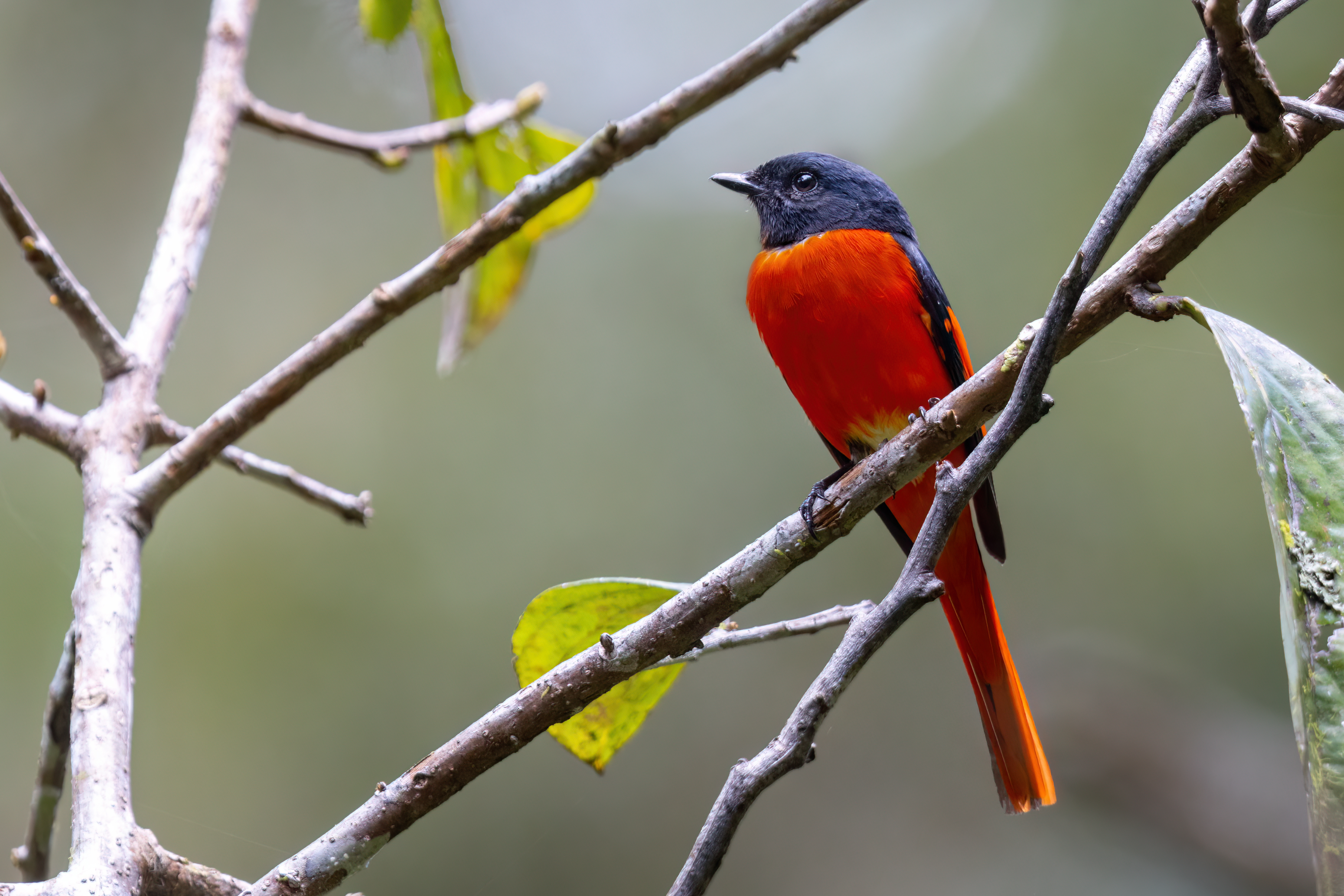
male P. s. cinereigula, Borneo

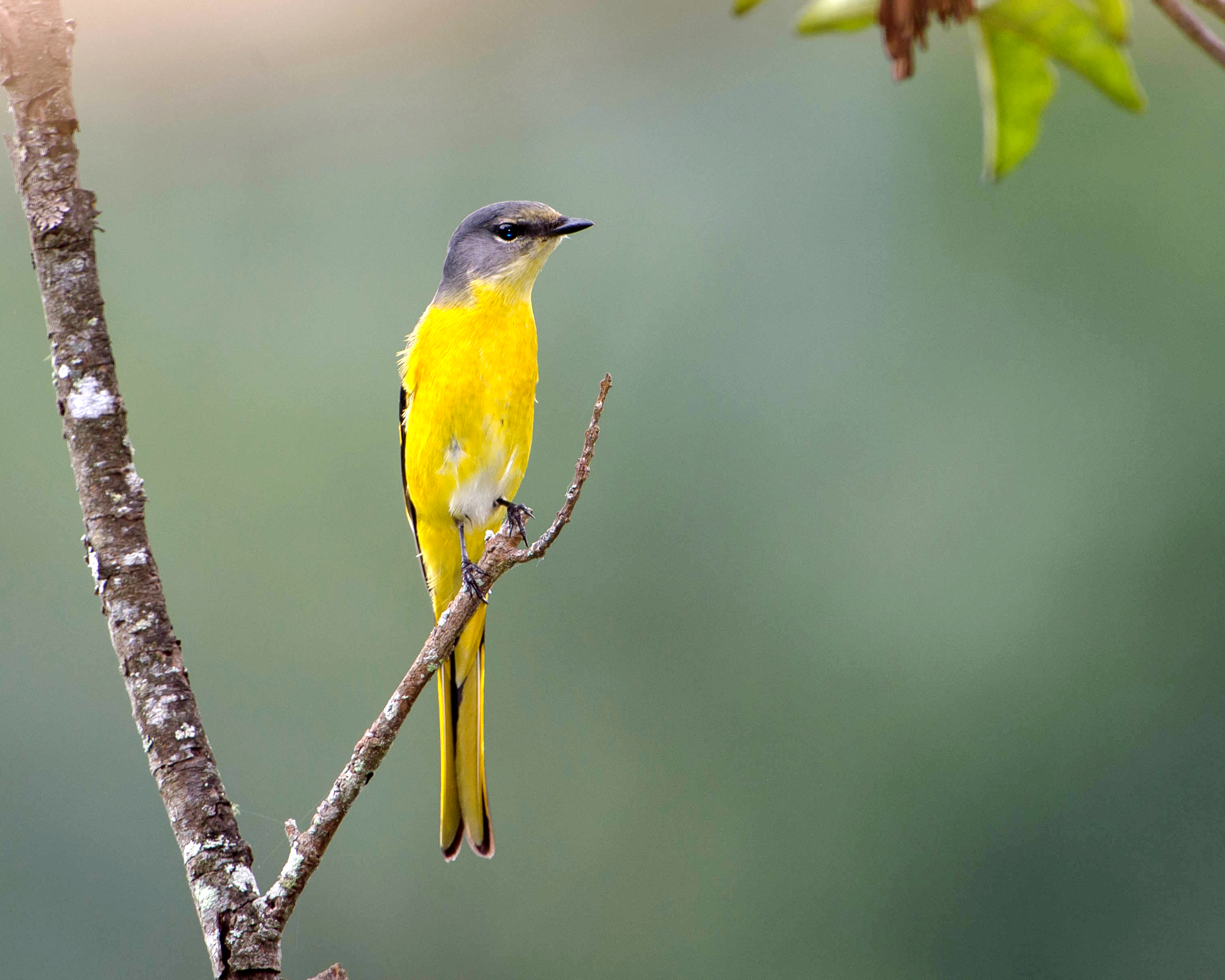
female P. s. rubrolimbatus, northern Thailand

== Description ==
The grey-chinned minivet is 17–19 cm (6.7–7.5 in) long and weighs 11–17 g (0.39–0.60 oz). It is sexually dimorphic. The adult male has a dark grey head and mantle, a pale grey chin, an orange-yellow throat and blackish wings. The underparts, lower back and tips of the greater coverts are orange. In the female, these parts are bright yellow instead. The eyes, beak and legs are black. The immature bird is similar to the female but has yellow-olive bars on its back.

== Distribution and habitat ==
This species ranges from the eastern foothills of the Himalayas through northeastern India, southern China, mainland Southeast Asia to Sumatra and Borneo. Its habitat is montane forest about 1,000–2,000 m (3,300–6,600 ft) in elevation. In Taiwan, it has been recorded down to 150 m (490 ft). It lives in the canopy of broadleaf forest and also coniferous forest, elfin forest, secondary forest, forest edges and gardens with trees. It is thought that all 12 of the minivet species adaptively radiated in mainland Asia and later dispersed to the Indonesian archipelago.

== Behaviour ==
When not breeding, this minivet forms small parties with fewer than 15 individuals and also large flocks of dozens of birds; it sometimes joins mixed-species foraging flocks. It forages for invertebrates in the canopy, sometimes descending to tree ferns or sallying in the air. It gives a twittering call while feeding, and contact calls include a high-pitched sri-sisi and a chirit-chirit.

Breeding has been recorded from February to April and has been inferred to occur in January. The male has been observed walking towards the female while holding a flower in its beak; the male swung its head, touched the female's beak and dropped the flower, and then they mated.

The nest, constructed by both sexes, is built on a branch or fork of a tree. It is a steep cup made of bryophytes and covered with felt externally. Lichens are added to camouflage the nest, and the female shapes the nest by pushing against the rim with its breast. The eggs have not been described. The male and female raise the brood together, and subadults have been seen helping them. Moulting occurs from June to October.

== Status ==
This species has a large range and stable population, so the IUCN has assessed it as a least-concern species.
