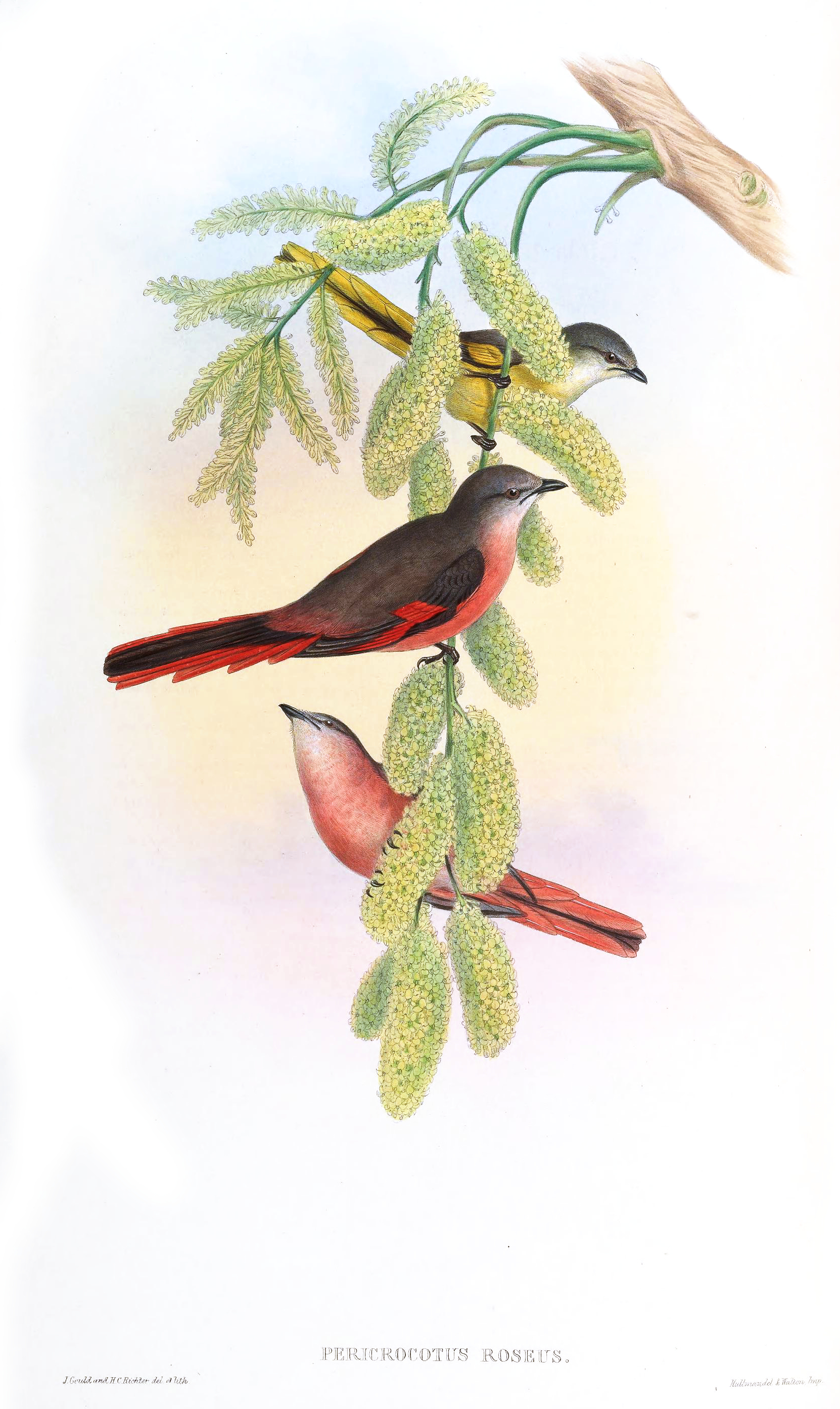

Conservation status
- Least Concern (IUCN 3.1)

Scientific classification
- Kingdom: Animalia
- Phylum: Chordata
- Class: Aves
- Order: Passeriformes
- Family: Campephagidae
- Genus: Pericrocotus
- Species: P. roseus

Binomial name
- Pericrocotus roseus (Vieillot, 1818)

Synonyms
- Muscicapa rosea Vieillot, 1818

= Rosy minivet =

Species of bird

The rosy minivet (Pericrocotus roseus) is a species of bird in the family Campephagidae. It is omnivorous.

== Description ==
The male is distinguished from other minivets by having a deep pink/light red shade in wings and tail and the female having an olive/olive yellow rump as against bright yellow in other minivets. Both male and female are grey above.

== Distribution ==
It is found in Afghanistan, Bangladesh, Bhutan, China, India, Laos, Myanmar, Nepal, Pakistan, Thailand, and Vietnam. In India, it is found in the Himalayas from west to east to Arunachal Pradesh and hills of Nagaland and Manipur. In winter in peninsula. Its natural habitats are subtropical or tropical moist lowland forest, and subtropical or tropical moist montane forest.

== Gallery ==
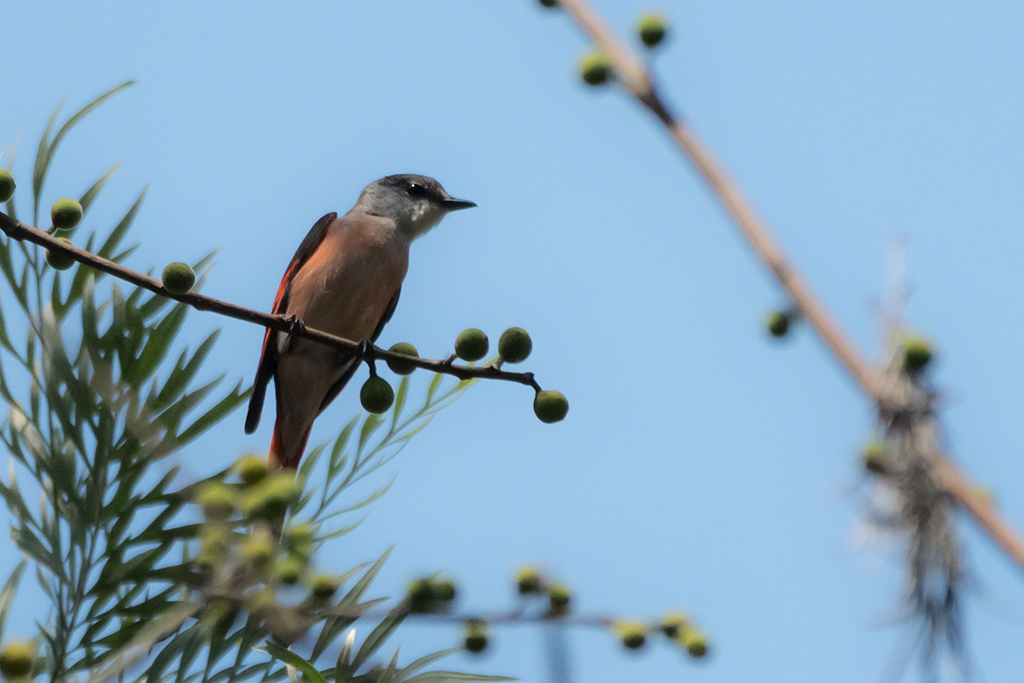
Rosy minivet male, Maredumilli forest, Andhra Pradesh, India

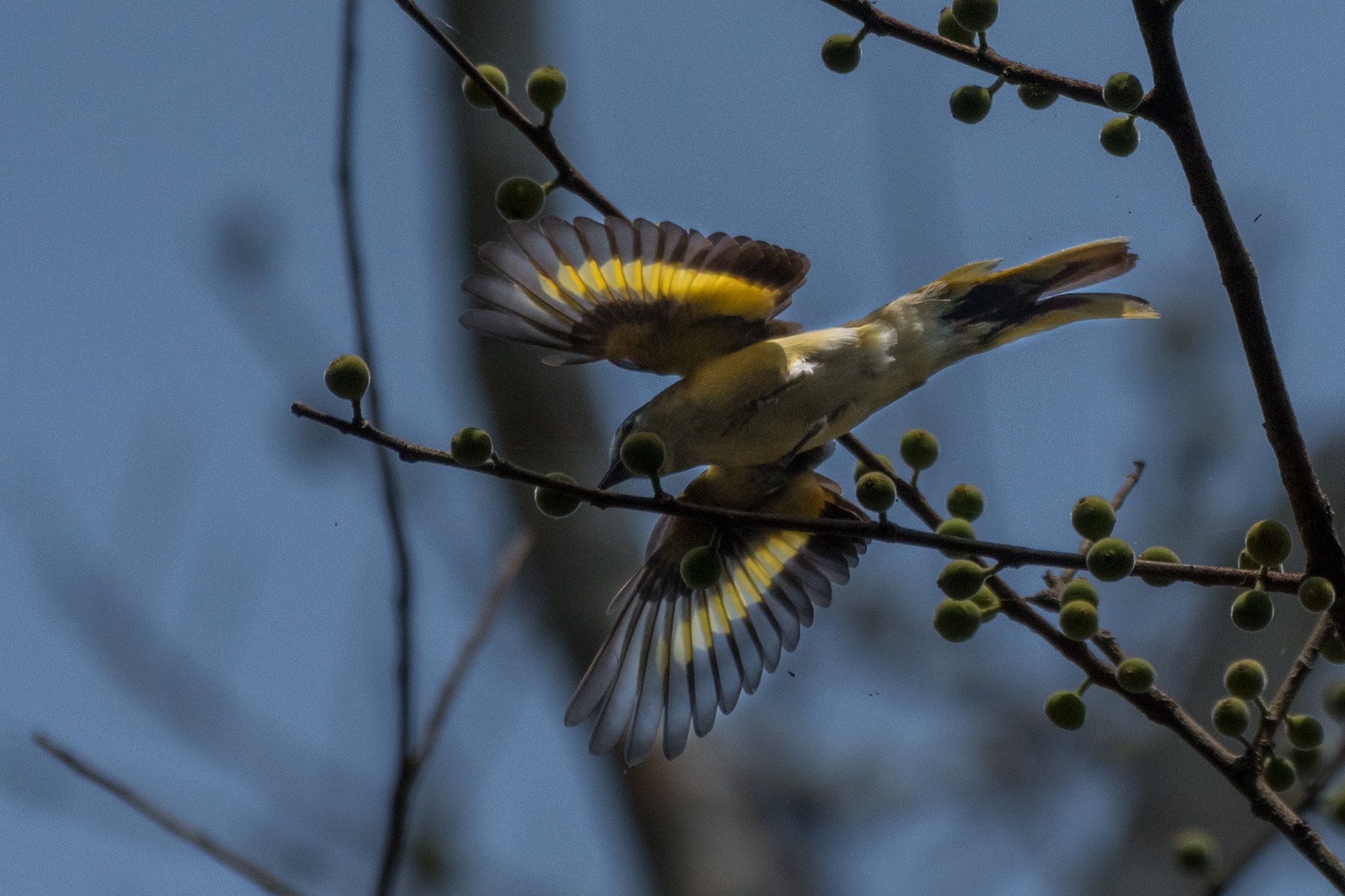
Rosy minivet female, Maredumilli forest, Andhra Pradesh, India

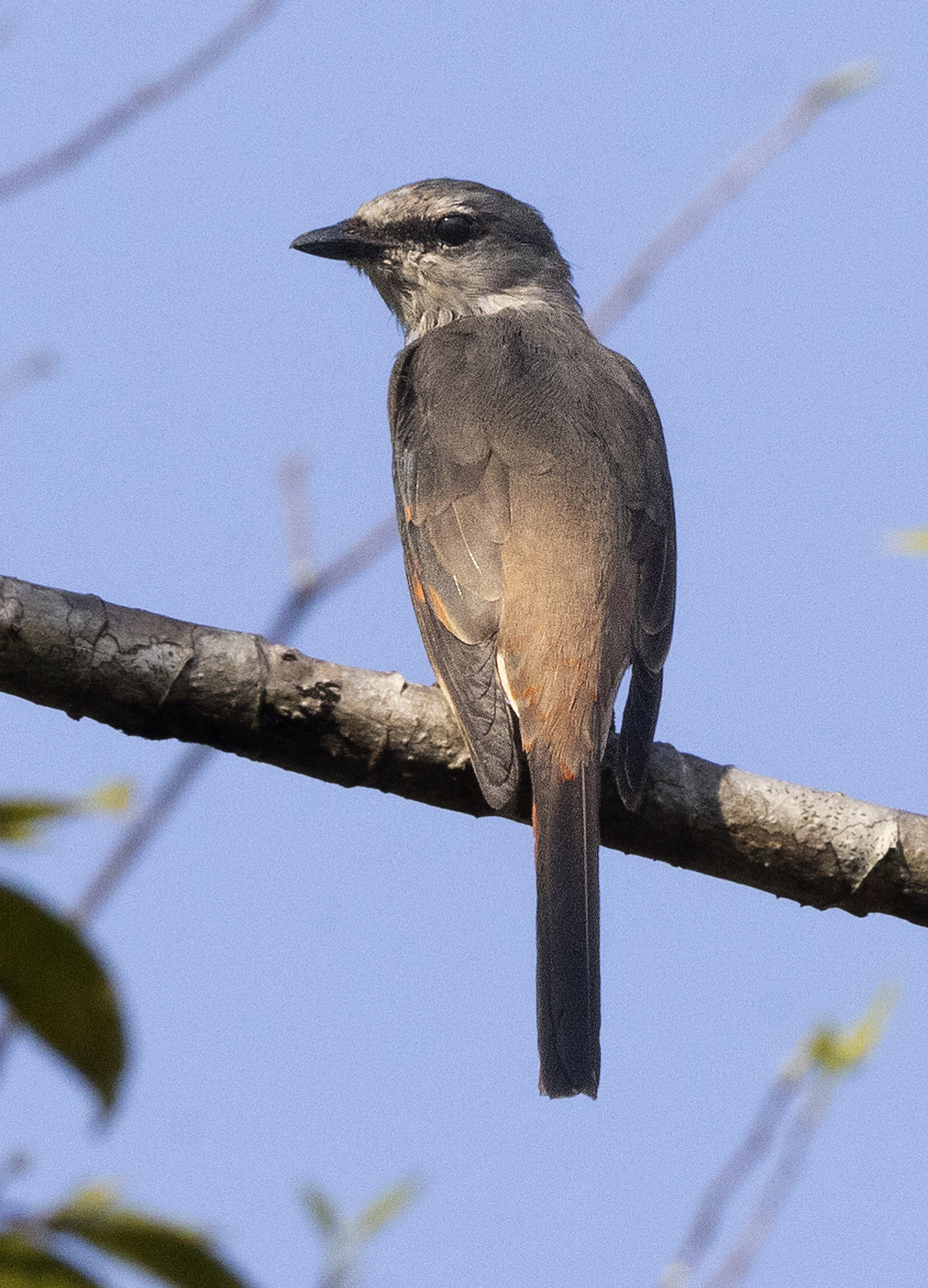
Male, Thailand

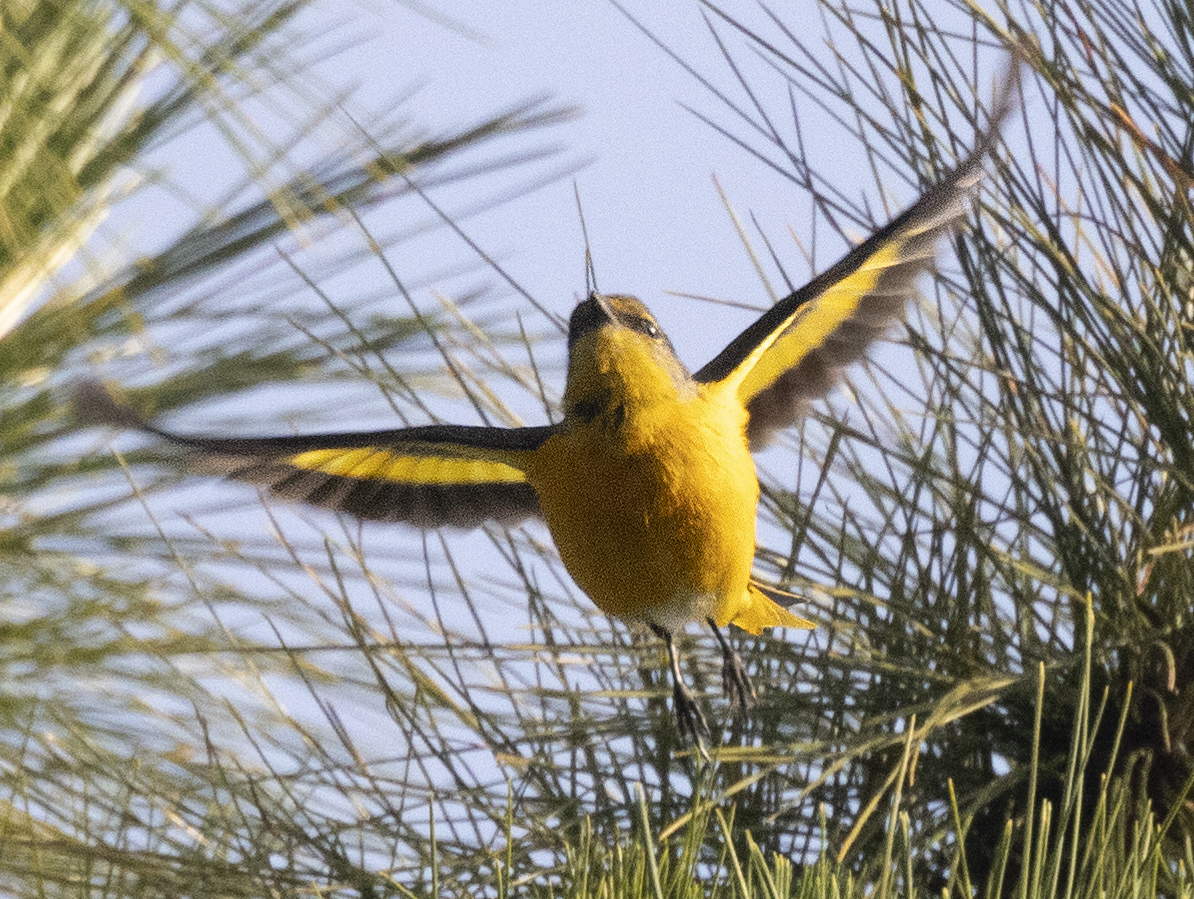
Female, Thailand
