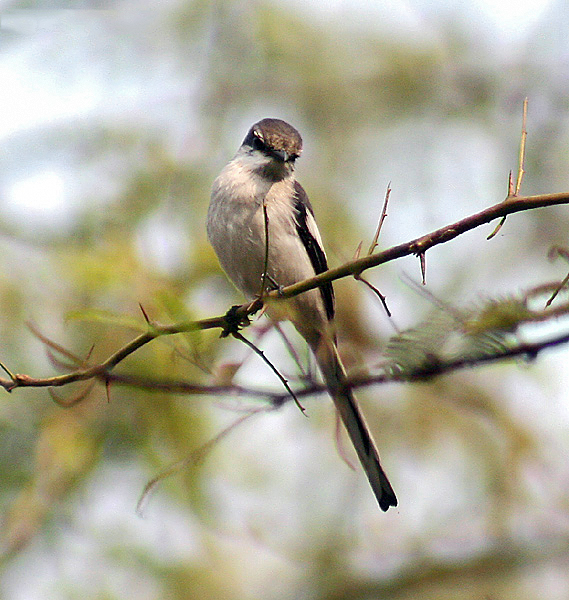
- at Bharatpur, Rajasthan, India.

Conservation status
- Least Concern (IUCN 3.1)

Scientific classification
- Kingdom: Animalia
- Phylum: Chordata
- Class: Aves
- Order: Passeriformes
- Family: Campephagidae
- Genus: Pericrocotus
- Species: P. erythropygius

Binomial name
- Pericrocotus erythropygius (Jerdon, 1840)

Synonyms
- Muscicapa erythropygia Jerdon, 1840

= White-bellied minivet =

Species of bird

The white-bellied minivet (Pericrocotus erythropygius) is a species of minivet found in India, mostly in dry deciduous forest.

== Etymology ==
The origin of the vernacular name of minivets is not known but it seems to be the English adaptation of an Indian name perhaps imitative. The genus Pericrocotus seems to be related to the saffron color of some minivets.

== Description ==
The male white-bellied minivet has a shiny black head, neck, tail and mantle. The species has a white collar, the throat is orange, the rest of the underparts are also white. The rump is orange with white markings on the wings.

The female minivet is duller in appearance, with dark gray upperparts, black wings, white collar, black tail and shiny black lores. The wings have white markings similar to those of the males, and the rump is orange.

It measures between 18.5 and 20 cm long.

== Habitat and behavior ==
The white-bellied minivet is native to Nepal and India, mainly in dry deciduous forests. This species inhabits open savanna with sparse acacia shoots, dry grasslands and artificial terrestrial areas such as agricultural land. It occupies an extremely large area of occurrence of over 20,000 km^{2}.

The minivet usually moves in small groups, sometimes joining other species. It feeds mainly on insects that it catches in flight or by perching in the canopy of trees.

Its voice is a pleasant whistle.

== Reproduction ==
This bird makes its nest high in the tree tops. The nest is a cup-shaped structure woven with small twigs and spider webs to increase the strength of the nest. Usually four eggs are laid. These are incubated for 17 to 18 days. Incubation is mainly done by the female, but both birds help raise the offspring.

== Subspecies ==
There are two subspecies of the white-bellied minivet :

P. e. albifrons: present in the plains in central Myanmar;

P. e. erythropygius : present in peninsular India (Punjab and Rajasthan to Bihar and Mysore).

== Conservation status ==
The population is stable, it is considered by the IUCN as "least concern".

== Gallery ==
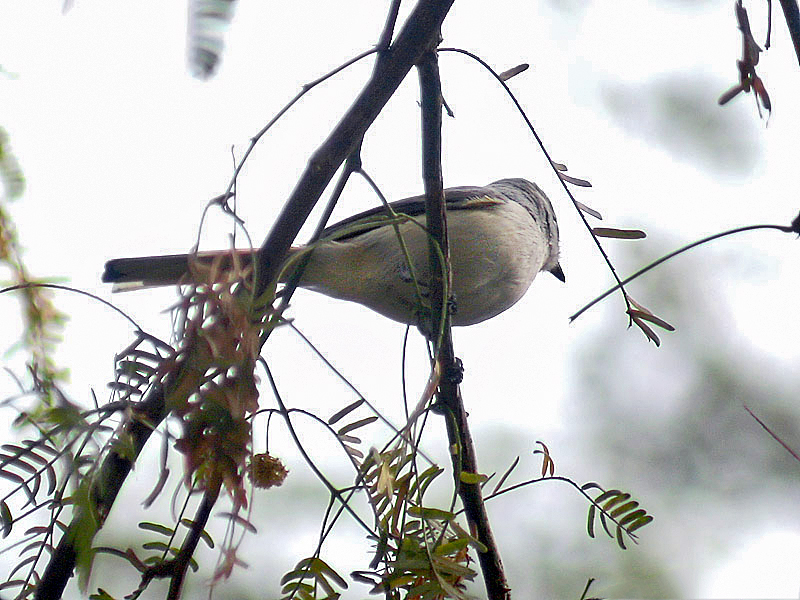
White-bellied minivet at Bharatpur, Rajasthan, India.

Male at Gir National Park, Gujarat, India.
