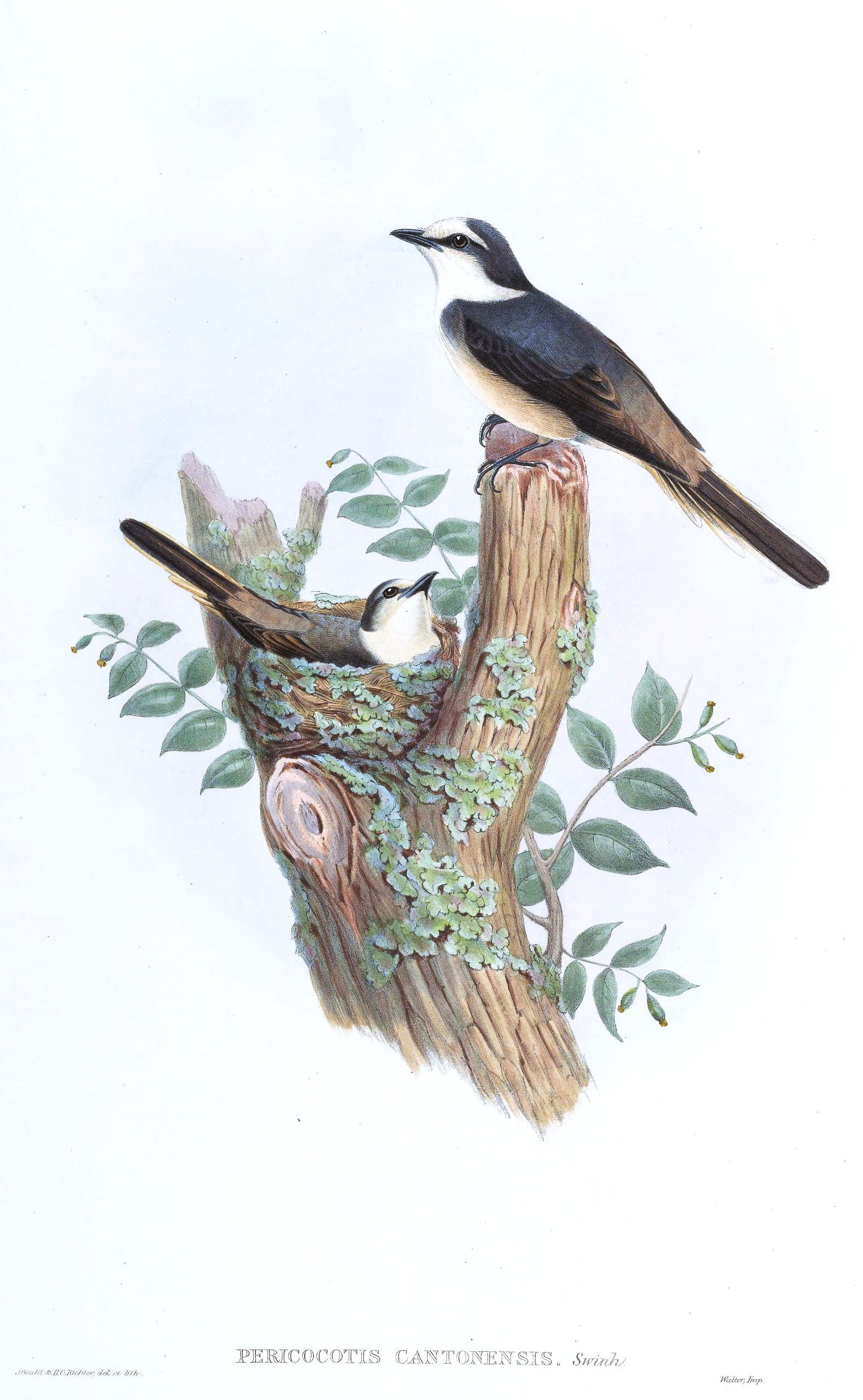

Conservation status
- Least Concern (IUCN 3.1)

Scientific classification
- Kingdom: Animalia
- Phylum: Chordata
- Class: Aves
- Order: Passeriformes
- Family: Campephagidae
- Genus: Pericrocotus
- Species: P. cantonensis

Binomial name
- Pericrocotus cantonensis R. Swinhoe, 1861

= Swinhoe's minivet =

Species of bird

Swinhoe's minivet or the brown-rumped minivet (Pericrocotus cantonensis) is a bird in the cuckooshrike family, Campephagidae. The species was first described by Robert Swinhoe in 1861.

It breeds in China and winters in Indochina. Its natural habitats are temperate forest, subtropical or tropical moist lowland forest, and subtropical or tropical moist montane forest.

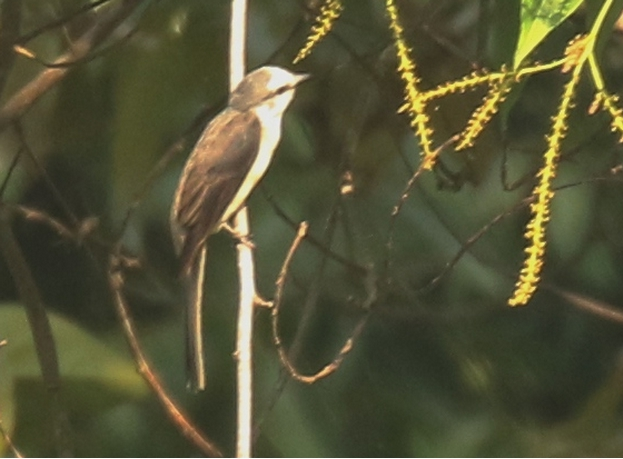
Khao Yai National Park - Thailand
