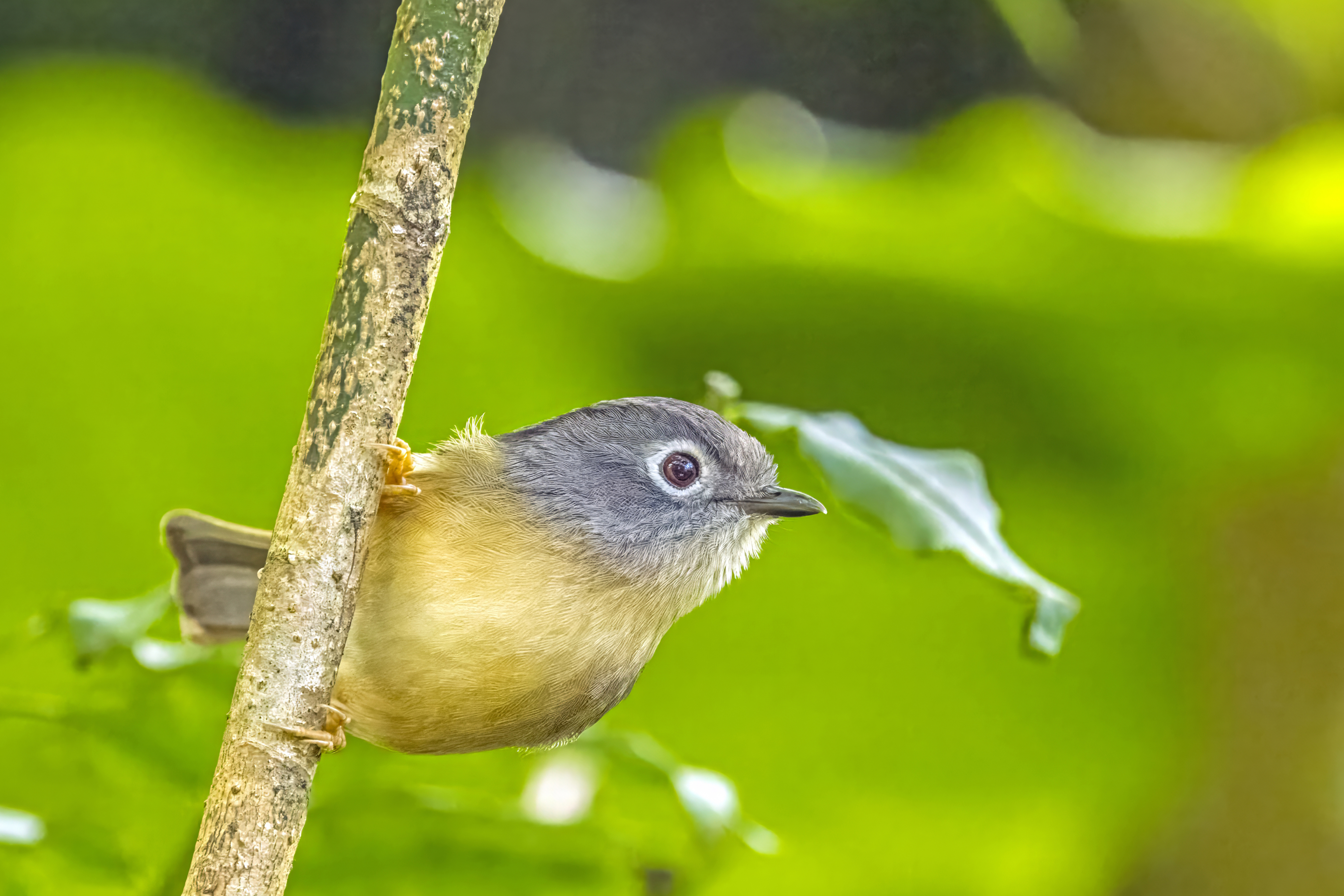

Conservation status
- Not evaluated (IUCN 3.1)

Scientific classification
- Kingdom: Animalia
- Phylum: Chordata
- Class: Aves
- Order: Passeriformes
- Family: Leiothrichidae
- Genus: Alcippe
- Species: A. morrisonia

Binomial name
- Alcippe morrisonia R. Swinhoe, 1863

= Grey-cheeked fulvetta =

Species of bird

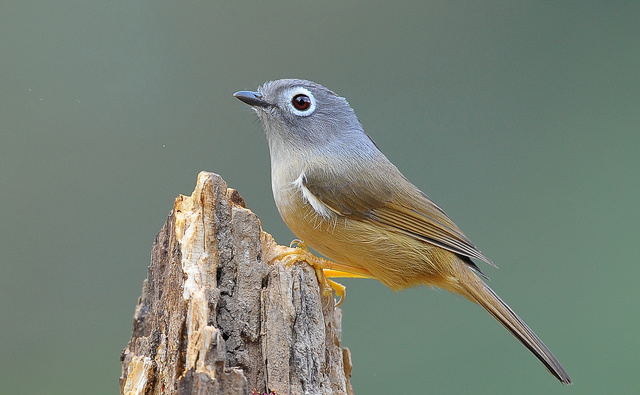

The grey-cheeked fulvetta or Morrison's fulvetta (Alcippe morrisonia) is a bird in the laughingthrush family Leiothrichidae. It is endemic to Taiwan, where it is found in montane forest and other upland habitats.

== Taxonomy and systematics ==
The species was first described by Robert Swinhoe in 1863. Its specific name is derived from Yushan, the tallest mountain in Taiwan, which was known to westerners as Mount Morrison. The grey-cheeked fulvetta is part of a species complex which was once considered to represent a single species, but on the basis of some DNA studies it has been split into four species. The nominate race morrisonia, restricted to Taiwan, has been retained as the grey-cheeked fulvetta, with David's fulvetta (Alcippe davidi), Huet's fulvetta (Alcippe hueti) and Yunnan fulvetta (Alcippe fratercula) all now recognised as a separate species. This split has not been accepted by all ornithological authorities however, and further study is required.

== Distribution and habitat ==
It is a year-round resident throughout Taiwan, where it is among the most common passerine birds on the island. The species occupies a range of habitats from 600 to 3,000 m (2,000 to 9,800 ft), sometimes coming down as low as 50 m (160 ft) above sea-level. It will occupy primary and secondary broadleaf forest, scrub and stands of bamboo, but is most common in forests dominated by the tree families Lauraceae and Fagaceae. In coniferous forest it is replaced by the dusky fulvetta.

== Characteristics ==
The bird is about 14 cm (5.5 in) long, with brown upperparts, buff underparts and a predominantly grey head. It has a conspicuous white eye-ring and narrow dark stripes along the sides of the crown, which vary in prominence and can be difficult to see.

Its call is a weak chi-chi-chu-chui. It will readily join mixed-species feeding flocks, where it is a nucleus species around which other birds congregate. It also is the generally the most dominant species found in these flocks.
