= List of birds of Myanmar =

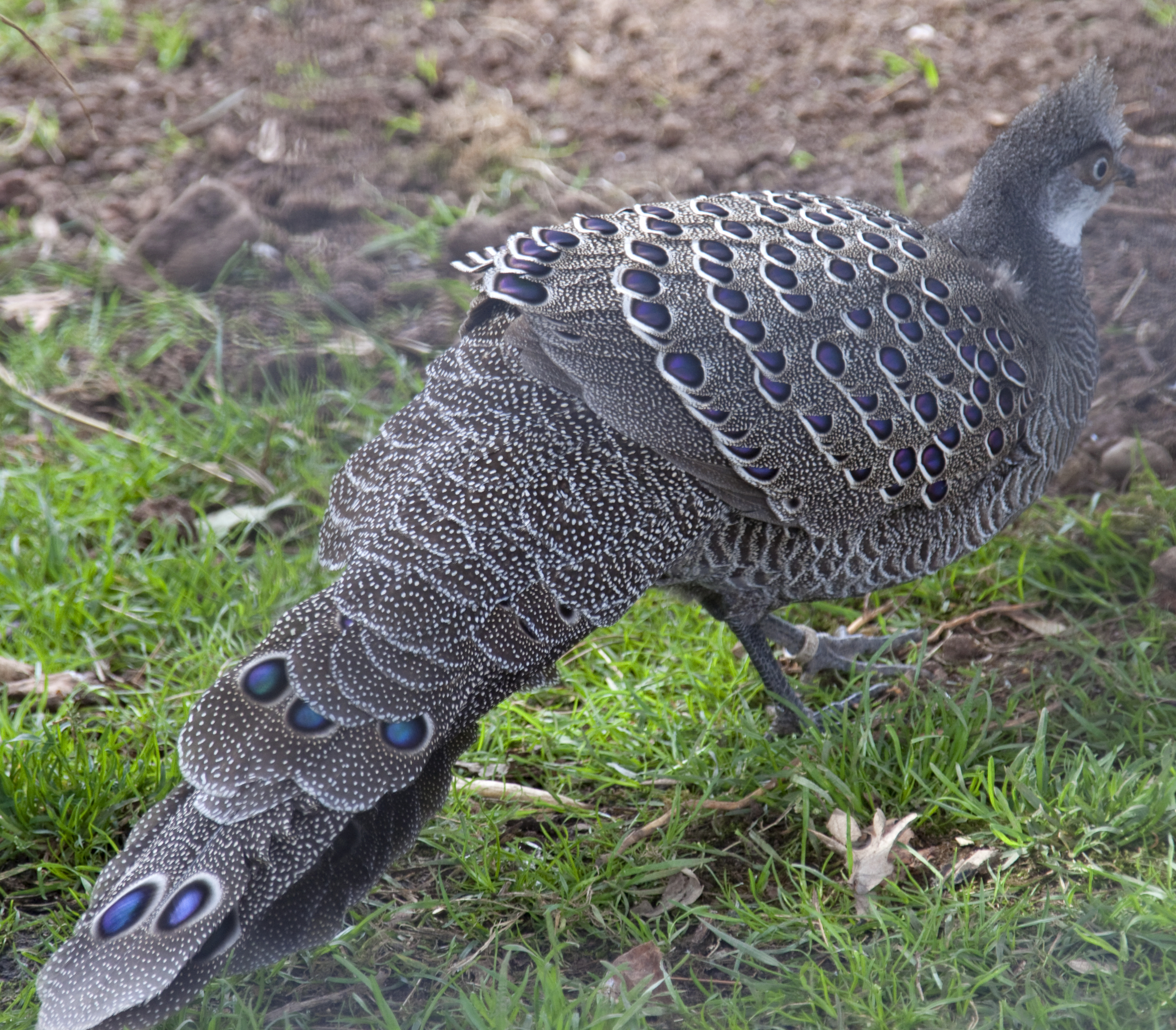
The grey peacock-pheasant is the national bird of Myanmar.

This is a list of the bird species recorded in Myanmar. The avifauna of Myanmar include a total of 1150 species, of which 7 are endemic, and two have been introduced by humans. 68 species are globally threatened.

This list's taxonomic treatment (designation and sequence of orders, families and species) and nomenclature (common and scientific names) follow the conventions of The Clements Checklist of Birds of the World, 2022 edition. The family accounts at the beginning of each heading reflect this taxonomy, as do the species counts found in each family account. Introduced and accidental species are included in the total counts for Myanmar.

The following tags have been used to highlight several categories. The commonly occurring native species do not fall into any of these categories.

- (A) Accidental – a species that rarely or accidentally occurs in Myanmar
- (E) Endemic – a species endemic to Myanmar
- (I) Introduced – a species introduced to Myanmar as a consequence, direct or indirect, of human actions
- (Ex) Extirpated – a species that no longer occurs in Myanmar although populations exist elsewhere

== Ducks, geese, and waterfowl ==
Order: Anseriformes Family: Anatidae

Anatidae includes the ducks and most duck-like waterfowl, such as geese and swans. These birds are adapted to an aquatic existence with webbed feet, flattened bills, and feathers that are excellent at shedding water due to an oily coating.

- Fulvous whistling-duck, Dendrocygna bicolor
- Lesser whistling-duck, Dendrocygna javanica
- Bar-headed goose, Anser indicus
- Graylag goose, Anser anser
- Greater white-fronted goose, Anser albifrons
- Taiga bean-goose, Anser fabalis (A)
- Tundra bean-goose, Anser serrirostris (A)
- Knob-billed duck, Sarkidiornis melanotos
- Ruddy shelduck, Tadorna ferruginea
- Common shelduck, Tadorna tadorna
- Cotton pygmy-goose, Nettapus coromandelianus
- Mandarin duck, Aix galericulata (A)
- Baikal teal, Sibirionetta formosa
- Garganey, Spatula querquedula
- Northern shoveler, Spatula clypeata
- Gadwall, Mareca strepera
- Falcated duck, Mareca falcata
- Eurasian wigeon, Mareca penelope
- Indian spot-billed duck, Anas poecilorhyncha
- Eastern spot-billed duck, Anas zonorhyncha
- Mallard, Anas platyrhynchos
- Northern pintail, Anas acuta
- Green-winged teal, Anas crecca
- Pink-headed duck, Rhodonessa caryophyllacea (Ex?)
- White-winged duck, Asarcornis scutulata
- Red-crested pochard, Netta rufina
- Common pochard, Aythya ferina
- Ferruginous duck, Aythya nyroca
- Baer's pochard, Aythya baeri
- Tufted duck, Aythya fuligula
- Greater scaup, Aythya marila
- Common goldeneye, Bucephala clangula
- Smew, Mergellus albellus
- Common merganser, Mergus merganser
- Red-breasted merganser, Mergus serrator
- Scaly-sided merganser, Mergus squamatus

== Megapodes ==
Order: Galliformes Family: Megapodiidae

The Megapodiidae are stocky, medium-large chicken-like birds with small heads and large feet. All but the malleefowl occupy jungle habitats and most have brown or black colouring.

- Tabon scrubfowl, Megapodius cumingii

== Pheasants, grouse, and allies ==
Order: Galliformes Family: Phasianidae

The Phasianidae are a family of terrestrial birds. In general, they are plump (although they vary in size) and have broad, relatively short wings.

- Ferruginous partridge, Caloperdix oculeus
- Crested partridge, Rollulus rouloul
- Hill partridge, Arborophila torqueola
- Rufous-throated partridge, Arborophila rufogularis
- White-cheeked partridge, Arborophila atrogularis
- Bar-backed partridge, Arborophila brunneopectus
- Scaly-breasted partridge, Tropicoperdix chloropus
- Chestnut-necklaced partridge, Tropicoperdix charltonii
- Long-billed partridge, Rhizothera longirostris
- Great argus, Argusianus argus
- Green peafowl, Pavo muticus
- Malayan peacock-pheasant, Polyplectron malacense
- Gray peacock-pheasant, Polyplectron bicalcaratum
- Blue-breasted quail, Synoicus chinensis
- Japanese quail, Coturnix japonica
- Common quail, Coturnix coturnix
- Rain quail, Coturnix coromandelica
- Chinese francolin, Francolinus pintadeanus
- Mountain bamboo-partridge, Bambusicola fytchii
- Red junglefowl, Gallus gallus
- Blood pheasant, Ithaginis cruentus
- Himalayan monal, Lophophorus impejanus
- Sclater's monal, Lophophorus sclateri
- Snow partridge, Lerwa lerwa (A)
- Blyth's tragopan, Tragopan blythii
- Temminck's tragopan, Tragopan temminckii
- Hume's pheasant, Syrmaticus humiae
- Lady Amherst's pheasant, Chrysolophus amherstiae
- Ring-necked pheasant, Phasianus colchicus
- Silver pheasant, Lophura nycthemera
- Kalij pheasant, Lophura leucomelanos
- Siamese fireback, Lophura diardi
- Malayan crestless fireback, Lophura erythrophthalma
- Malayan crested fireback, Lophura rufa

== Grebes ==
Order: Podicipediformes Family: Podicipedidae

Grebes are small to medium-large freshwater diving birds. They have lobed toes and are excellent swimmers and divers. However, they have their feet placed far back on the body, making them quite ungainly on land.

- Little grebe, Tachybaptus ruficollis
- Great crested grebe, Podiceps cristatus
- Eared grebe, Podiceps nigricollis

== Pigeons and doves ==
Order: Columbiformes Family: Columbidae

Pigeons and doves are stout-bodied birds with short necks and short slender bills with a fleshy cere.

- Rock pigeon, Columba livia
- Snow pigeon, Columba leuconota
- Speckled wood-pigeon, Columba hodgsonii
- Ashy wood-pigeon, Columba pulchricollis
- Pale-capped pigeon, Columba punicea
- Oriental turtle-dove, Streptopelia orientalis
- Eurasian collared-dove, Streptopelia decaocto
- Burmese collared-dove, Streptopelia xanthocycla
- Red collared-dove, Streptopelia tranquebarica
- Spotted dove, Spilopelia chinensis
- Barred cuckoo-dove, Macropygia unchall
- Little cuckoo-dove, Macropygia ruficeps
- Asian emerald dove, Chalcophaps indica
- Zebra dove, Geopelia striata
- Nicobar pigeon, Caloenas nicobarica
- Pink-necked green-pigeon, Treron vernans
- Cinnamon-headed green-pigeon, Treron fulvicollis
- Orange-breasted green-pigeon, Treron bicincta
- Andaman green pigeon, Treron chloropterus
- Ashy-headed green-pigeon, Treron phayrei
- Thick-billed green-pigeon, Treron curvirostra
- Large green-pigeon, Treron capellei
- Yellow-footed green-pigeon, Treron phoenicoptera
- Pin-tailed green-pigeon, Treron apicauda
- Wedge-tailed green-pigeon, Treron sphenura
- Green imperial-pigeon, Ducula aenea
- Mountain imperial-pigeon, Ducula badia
- Pied imperial-pigeon, Ducula bicolor

== Cuckoos ==
Order: Cuculiformes Family: Cuculidae

The family Cuculidae includes cuckoos, roadrunners and anis. These birds are of variable size with slender bodies, long tails and strong legs.

- Andaman coucal, Centropus andamanensis
- Greater coucal, Centropus sinensis
- Lesser coucal, Centropus bengalensis
- Raffles's malkoha, Rhinortha chlorophaea
- Red-billed malkoha, Zanclostomus javanicus
- Chestnut-breasted malkoha, Phaenicophaeus curvirostris
- Chestnut-bellied malkoha, Phaenicophaeus sumatranus
- Black-bellied malkoha, Phaenicophaeus diardi
- Green-billed malkoha, Phaenicophaeus tristis
- Chestnut-winged cuckoo, Clamator coromandus
- Pied cuckoo, Clamator jacobinus
- Asian koel, Eudynamys scolopaceus
- Asian emerald cuckoo, Chrysococcyx maculatus
- Violet cuckoo, Chrysococcyx xanthorhynchus
- Banded bay cuckoo, Cacomantis sonneratii
- Plaintive cuckoo, Cacomantis merulinus
- Fork-tailed drongo-cuckoo, Surniculus dicruroides
- Square-tailed drongo-cuckoo, Surniculus lugubris
- Moustached hawk-cuckoo, Hierococcyx vagans
- Large hawk-cuckoo, Hierococcyx sparverioides
- Common hawk-cuckoo, Hierococcyx varius
- Northern hawk-cuckoo, Hierococcyx hyperythrus
- Hodgson's hawk-cuckoo, Hierococcyx nisicolor
- Lesser cuckoo, Cuculus poliocephalus
- Indian cuckoo, Cuculus micropterus
- Himalayan cuckoo, Cuculus saturatus
- Common cuckoo, Cuculus canorus
- Oriental cuckoo, Cuculus optatus

== Frogmouths ==
Order: Caprimulgiformes Family: Podargidae

The frogmouths are a group of nocturnal birds related to the nightjars. They are named for their large flattened hooked bill and huge frog-like gape, which they use to take insects.

- Hodgson's frogmouth, Batrachostomus hodgsoni
- Blyth's frogmouth, Batrachostomus affinis

== Nightjars ==
Order: Caprimulgiformes Family: Caprimulgidae

Nightjars are medium-sized nocturnal birds that usually nest on the ground. They have long wings, short legs and very short bills. Most have small feet, of little use for walking, and long pointed wings. Their soft plumage is camouflaged to resemble bark or leaves.

- Great eared-nightjar, Lyncornis macrotis
- Gray nightjar, Caprimulgus jotaka
- Large-tailed nightjar, Caprimulgus macrurus
- Indian nightjar, Caprimulgus asiaticus
- Savanna nightjar, Caprimulgus affinis

== Swifts ==
Order: Caprimulgiformes Family: Apodidae

Swifts are small birds which spend the majority of their lives flying. These birds have very short legs and never settle voluntarily on the ground, perching instead only on vertical surfaces. Many swifts have long swept-back wings which resemble a crescent or boomerang.

- White-rumped needletail, Zoonavena sylvatica
- Silver-rumped needletail, Rhaphidura leucopygialis
- White-throated needletail, Hirundapus caudacutus
- Silver-backed needletail, Hirundapus cochinchinensis
- Brown-backed needletail, Hirundapus giganteus
- Plume-toed swiftlet, Collocalia affinis
- Himalayan swiftlet, Aerodramus brevirostris
- Black-nest swiftlet, Aerodramus maximus
- White-nest swiftlet, Aerodramus fuciphagus
- Germain's swiftlet, Aerodramus germani
- Pacific swift, Apus pacificus
- Cook's swift, Apus cooki
- Dark-rumped swift, Apus acuticauda (A)
- House swift, Apus nipalensis
- Asian palm-swift, Cypsiurus balasiensis

== Treeswifts ==
Order: Caprimulgiformes Family: Hemiprocnidae

The treeswifts, also called crested swifts, are closely related to the true swifts. They differ from the other swifts in that they have crests, long forked tails and softer plumage.

- Crested treeswift, Hemiprocne coronata
- Gray-rumped treeswift, Hemiprocne longipennis
- Whiskered treeswift, Hemiprocne comata

== Rails, gallinules and coots ==
Order: Gruiformes Family: Rallidae

Rallidae is a large family of small to medium-sized birds which includes the rails, crakes, coots and gallinules. Typically they inhabit dense vegetation in damp environments near lakes, swamps or rivers. In general they are shy and secretive birds, making them difficult to observe. Most species have strong legs and long toes which are well adapted to soft uneven surfaces. They tend to have short, rounded wings and to be weak fliers.

- Brown-cheeked rail, Rallus indicus
- Slaty-breasted rail, Lewinia striata
- Spotted crake, Porzana porzana (A)
- Eurasian moorhen, Gallinula chloropus
- Eurasian coot, Fulica atra
- Gray-headed swamphen, Porphyrio poliocephalus
- Watercock, Gallicrex cinerea
- White-breasted waterhen, Amaurornis phoenicurus
- White-browed crake, Poliolimnas cinereus (A)
- Red-legged crake, Rallina fasciata
- Slaty-legged crake, Rallina eurizonoides
- Ruddy-breasted crake, Zapornia fusca
- Brown crake, Zapornia akool
- Baillon's crake, Zapornia pusilla
- Black-tailed crake, Zapornia bicolor

== Finfoots ==
Order: Gruiformes Family: Heliornithidae

Heliornithidae is a small family of tropical birds with webbed lobes on their feet similar to those of grebes and coots.

- Masked finfoot, Heliopais personatus

== Cranes ==
Order: Gruiformes Family: Gruidae

Cranes are large, long-legged and long-necked birds. Unlike the similar-looking but unrelated herons, cranes fly with necks outstretched, not pulled back. Most have elaborate and noisy courting displays or "dances".

- Demoiselle crane, Anthropoides virgo
- Sarus crane, Antigone antigone
- Common crane, Grus grus
- Black-necked crane, Grus nigricollis

== Thick-knees ==
Order: Charadriiformes Family: Burhinidae

The thick-knees are a group of largely tropical waders in the family Burhinidae. They are found worldwide within the tropical zone, with some species also breeding in temperate Europe and Australia. They are medium to large waders with strong black or yellow-black bills, large yellow eyes and cryptic plumage. Despite being classed as waders, most species have a preference for arid or semi-arid habitats.

- Indian thick-knee, Burhinus indicus
- Great thick-knee, Esacus recurvirostris
- Beach thick-knee, Esacus magnirostris

== Stilts and avocets ==
Order: Charadriiformes Family: Recurvirostridae

Recurvirostridae is a family of large wading birds, which includes the avocets and stilts. The avocets have long legs and long up-curved bills. The stilts have extremely long legs and long, thin, straight bills.

- Black-winged stilt, Himantopus himantopus
- Pied stilt, Himantopus leucocephalus (A)
- Pied avocet, Recurvirostra avosetta

== Ibisbill ==
Order: Charadriiformes Family: Ibidorhynchidae

The ibisbill is related to the waders, but is sufficiently distinctive to be a family unto itself. The adult is grey with a white belly, red legs, a long down curved bill, and a black face and breast band.

- Ibisbill, Ibidorhyncha struthersii

== Oystercatchers ==
Order: Charadriiformes Family: Haematopodidae

The oystercatchers are large and noisy plover-like birds, with strong bills used for smashing or prising open molluscs.

- Eurasian oystercatcher, Haematopus ostralegus

== Plovers and lapwings ==
Order: Charadriiformes Family: Charadriidae

The family Charadriidae includes the plovers, dotterels and lapwings. They are small to medium-sized birds with compact bodies, short, thick necks and long, usually pointed, wings. They are found in open country worldwide, mostly in habitats near water.

- Black-bellied plover, Pluvialis squatarola
- Pacific golden plover, Pluvialis fulva
- Northern lapwing, Vanellus vanellus
- River lapwing, Vanellus duvaucelii
- Gray-headed lapwing, Vanellus cinereus
- Red-wattled lapwing, Vanellus indicus
- White-tailed lapwing, Vanellus leucurus
- Lesser sand-plover, Charadrius mongolus
- Greater sand-plover, Charadrius leschenaultii
- Malaysian plover, Charadrius peronii (A)
- Kentish plover, Charadrius alexandrinus
- White-faced plover, Charadrius dealbatus
- Common ringed plover, Charadrius hiaticula
- Long-billed plover, Charadrius placidus
- Little ringed plover, Charadrius dubius

== Painted-snipes ==
Order: Charadriiformes Family: Rostratulidae

Painted-snipes are short-legged, long-billed birds similar in shape to the true snipes, but more brightly coloured.

- Greater painted-snipe, Rostratula benghalensis

== Jacanas ==
Order: Charadriiformes Family: Jacanidae

The jacanas are a group of tropical waders in the family Jacanidae. They are found throughout the tropics. They are identifiable by their huge feet and claws which enable them to walk on floating vegetation in the shallow lakes that are their preferred habitat.

- Pheasant-tailed jacana, Hydrophasianus chirurgus
- Bronze-winged jacana, Metopidius indicus

== Sandpipers and allies ==
Order: Charadriiformes Family: Scolopacidae

Scolopacidae is a large diverse family of small to medium-sized shorebirds including the sandpipers, curlews, godwits, shanks, tattlers, woodcocks, snipes, dowitchers and phalaropes. The majority of these species eat small invertebrates picked out of the mud or soil. Variation in length of legs and bills enables multiple species to feed in the same habitat, particularly on the coast, without direct competition for food.

- Whimbrel, Numenius phaeopus
- Little curlew, Numenius minutus (A)
- Eurasian curlew, Numenius arquata
- Bar-tailed godwit, Limosa lapponica
- Black-tailed godwit, Limosa limosa
- Ruddy turnstone, Arenaria interpres
- Great knot, Calidris tenuirostris
- Red knot, Calidris canutus
- Ruff, Calidris pugnax
- Broad-billed sandpiper, Calidris falcinellus
- Sharp-tailed sandpiper, Calidris acuminata
- Curlew sandpiper, Calidris ferruginea
- Temminck's stint, Calidris temminckii
- Long-toed stint, Calidris subminuta
- Spoon-billed sandpiper, Calidris pygmeus
- Red-necked stint, Calidris ruficollis
- Sanderling, Calidris alba
- Dunlin, Calidris alpina (A)
- Little stint, Calidris minuta
- Asian dowitcher, Limnodromus semipalmatus
- Jack snipe, Lymnocryptes minimus
- Eurasian woodcock, Scolopax rusticola
- Solitary snipe, Gallinago solitaria
- Wood snipe, Gallinago nemoricola
- Great snipe, Gallinago media
- Common snipe, Gallinago gallinago
- Pin-tailed snipe, Gallinago stenura
- Swinhoe's snipe, Gallinago megala
- Terek sandpiper, Xenus cinereus
- Red-necked phalarope, Phalaropus lobatus
- Common sandpiper, Actitis hypoleucos
- Green sandpiper, Tringa ochropus
- Gray-tailed tattler, Tringa brevipes
- Spotted redshank, Tringa erythropus
- Common greenshank, Tringa nebularia
- Nordmann's greenshank, Tringa guttifer
- Marsh sandpiper, Tringa stagnatilis
- Wood sandpiper, Tringa glareola
- Common redshank, Tringa totanus

== Buttonquail ==
Order: Charadriiformes Family: Turnicidae

The buttonquail are small, drab, running birds which resemble the true quails. The female is the brighter of the sexes and initiates courtship. The male incubates the eggs and tends the young.

- Small buttonquail, Turnix sylvatica
- Yellow-legged buttonquail, Turnix tanki
- Barred buttonquail, Turnix suscitator

== Crab-plover ==
Order: Charadriiformes Family: Dromadidae

The crab-plover is related to the waders. It resembles a plover but with very long grey legs and a strong heavy black bill similar to a tern. It has black-and-white plumage, a long neck, partially webbed feet and a bill designed for eating crabs.

- Crab plover, Dromas ardeola (A)

== Pratincoles and coursers ==
Order: Charadriiformes Family: Glareolidae

Glareolidae is a family of wading birds comprising the pratincoles, which have short legs, long pointed wings and long forked tails, and the coursers, which have long legs, short wings and long, pointed bills which curve downwards.

- Oriental pratincole, Glareola maldivarum
- Small pratincole, Glareola lactea

== Skuas and jaegers ==
Order: Charadriiformes Family: Stercorariidae

The family Stercorariidae are, in general, medium to large birds, typically with grey or brown plumage, often with white markings on the wings. They nest on the ground in temperate and arctic regions and are long-distance migrants.

- South polar skua, Stercorarius maccormicki (A)
- Pomarine jaeger, Stercorarius pomarinus
- Parasitic jaeger, Stercorarius parasiticus

== Gulls, terns, and skimmers ==
Order: Charadriiformes Family: Laridae

Laridae is a family of medium to large seabirds, the gulls, terns, and skimmers. Gulls are typically grey or white, often with black markings on the head or wings. They have stout, longish bills and webbed feet. Terns are a group of generally medium to large seabirds typically with grey or white plumage, often with black markings on the head. Most terns hunt fish by diving but some pick insects off the surface of fresh water. Terns are generally long-lived birds, with several species known to live in excess of 30 years. Skimmers are a small family of tropical tern-like birds. They have an elongated lower mandible which they use to feed by flying low over the water surface and skimming the water for small fish.

- Black-legged kittiwake, Rissa tridactyla (A)
- Slender-billed gull, Chroicocephalus genei (A)
- Black-headed gull, Chroicocephalus ridibundus
- Brown-headed gull, Chroicocephalus brunnicephalus
- Pallas's gull, Ichthyaetus ichthyaetus
- Herring gull, Larus argentatus
- Lesser black-backed gull, Larus fuscus
- Brown noddy, Anous stolidus
- Sooty tern, Onychoprion fuscatus
- Bridled tern, Onychoprion anaethetus
- Little tern, Sternula albifrons
- Gull-billed tern, Gelochelidon nilotica
- Caspian tern, Hydroprogne caspia
- White-winged tern, Chlidonias leucopterus
- Whiskered tern, Chlidonias hybrida
- Roseate tern, Sterna dougallii
- Black-naped tern, Sterna sumatrana
- Common tern, Sterna hirundo
- Black-bellied tern, Sterna acuticauda
- River tern, Sterna aurantia
- Great crested tern, Thalasseus bergii
- Lesser crested tern, Thalasseus bengalensis
- Indian skimmer, Rynchops albicollis

== Tropicbirds ==
Order: Phaethontiformes Family: Phaethontidae

Tropicbirds are slender white birds of tropical oceans, with exceptionally long central tail feathers. Their heads and long wings have black markings.

- White-tailed tropicbird, Phaethon lepturus (A)
- Red-billed tropicbird, Phaethon aethereus

== Southern storm-petrels ==
Order: Procellariiformes Family: Oceanitidae

The southern storm-petrels are relatives of the petrels and are the smallest seabirds. They feed on planktonic crustaceans and small fish picked from the surface, typically while hovering. The flight is fluttering and sometimes bat-like.

- Wilson's storm-petrel, Oceanites oceanicus
- Black-bellied storm-petrel, Fregetta tropica (A)

== Northern storm-petrels ==
Order: Procellariiformes Family: Hydrobatidae

Though the members of this family are similar in many respects to the southern storm-petrels, including their general appearance and habits, there are enough genetic differences to warrant their placement in a separate family.

- Swinhoe's storm-petrel, Hydrobates monorhis

== Storks ==
Order: Ciconiiformes Family: Ciconiidae

Storks are large, long-legged, long-necked, wading birds with long, stout bills. Storks are mute, but bill-clattering is an important mode of communication at the nest. Their nests can be large and may be reused for many years. Many species are migratory.

- Asian openbill, Anastomus oscitans
- Black stork, Ciconia nigra
- Asian woolly-necked stork, Ciconia episcopus
- Storm's stork, Ciconia stormi (A)
- White stork, Ciconia ciconia
- Oriental stork, Ciconia boyciana
- Black-necked stork, Ephippiorhynchus asiaticus
- Lesser adjutant, Leptoptilos javanicus
- Greater adjutant, Leptoptilos dubius
- Painted stork, Mycteria leucocephala

== Frigatebirds ==
Order: Suliformes Family: Fregatidae

Frigatebirds are large seabirds usually found over tropical oceans. They are large, black-and-white or completely black, with long wings and deeply forked tails. The males have coloured inflatable throat pouches. They do not swim or walk and cannot take off from a flat surface. Having the largest wingspan-to-body-weight ratio of any bird, they are essentially aerial, able to stay aloft for more than a week.

- Christmas Island frigatebird, Fregata andrewsi
- Great frigatebird, Fregata minor (A)

== Boobies and gannets ==
Order: Suliformes Family: Sulidae

The sulids comprise the gannets and boobies. Both groups are medium to large coastal seabirds that plunge-dive for fish.

- Brown booby, Sula leucogaster

== Anhingas ==
Order: Suliformes Family: Anhingidae

Anhingas or darters are often called "snake-birds" because of their long thin neck, which gives a snake-like appearance when they swim with their bodies submerged. The males have black and dark-brown plumage, an erectile crest on the nape and a larger bill than the female. The females have much paler plumage especially on the neck and underparts. The darters have completely webbed feet and their legs are short and set far back on the body. Their plumage is somewhat permeable, like that of cormorants, and they spread their wings to dry after diving.

- Oriental darter, Anhinga melanogaster

== Cormorants and shags ==
Order: Suliformes Family: Phalacrocoracidae

Phalacrocoracidae is a family of medium to large coastal, fish-eating seabirds that includes cormorants and shags. Plumage colouration varies, with the majority having mainly dark plumage, some species being black-and-white and a few being colourful.

- Little cormorant, Microcarbo niger
- Great cormorant, Phalacrocorax carbo
- Indian cormorant, Phalacrocorax fuscicollis

== Pelicans ==
Order: Pelecaniformes Family: Pelecanidae

Pelicans are large water birds with a distinctive pouch under their beak. As with other members of the order Pelecaniformes, they have webbed feet with four toes.

- Great white pelican, Pelecanus onocrotalus
- Spot-billed pelican, Pelecanus philippensis (A)

== Herons, egrets, and bitterns ==
Order: Pelecaniformes Family: Ardeidae

The family Ardeidae contains the bitterns, herons and egrets. Herons and egrets are medium to large wading birds with long necks and legs. Bitterns tend to be shorter necked and more wary. Members of Ardeidae fly with their necks retracted, unlike other long-necked birds such as storks, ibises and spoonbills.

- Great bittern, Botaurus stellaris
- Yellow bittern, Ixobrychus sinensis
- Schrenck's bittern, Ixobrychus eurhythmus
- Cinnamon bittern, Ixobrychus cinnamomeus
- Black bittern, Ixobrychus flavicollis
- Gray heron, Ardea cinerea
- White-bellied heron, Ardea insignis
- Great-billed heron, Ardea sumatrana
- Purple heron, Ardea purpurea
- Great egret, Ardea alba
- Intermediate egret, Ardea intermedia
- Chinese egret, Ardea eulophotes (A)
- Little egret, Egretta garzetta
- Pacific reef-heron, Egretta sacra
- Eastern cattle egret, Ardea coromanda
- Indian pond-heron, Ardeola grayii
- Chinese pond-heron, Ardeola bacchus
- Javan pond-heron, Ardeola speciosa
- Striated heron, Butorides striata
- Black-crowned night-heron, Nycticorax nycticorax
- Malayan night-heron, Gorsachius melanolophus

== Ibises and spoonbills ==
Order: Pelecaniformes Family: Threskiornithidae

Threskiornithidae is a family of large terrestrial and wading birds which includes the ibises and spoonbills. They have long, broad wings with 11 primary and about 20 secondary feathers. They are strong fliers and despite their size and weight, very capable soarers.

- Glossy ibis, Plegadis falcinellus
- Black-headed ibis, Threskiornis melanocephalus
- Red-naped ibis, Pseudibis papillosa
- White-shouldered ibis, Pseudibis davisoni (Ex?) (Note: Possibly extirpated according to IUCN)
- Eurasian spoonbill, Platalea leucorodia

== Osprey ==
Order: Accipitriformes Family: Pandionidae

The family Pandionidae contains only one species, the osprey. The osprey is a medium-large raptor which is a specialist fish-eater with a worldwide distribution.

- Osprey, Pandion haliaetus

== Hawks, eagles, and kites ==
Order: Accipitriformes Family: Accipitridae

Accipitridae is a family of birds of prey, which includes hawks, eagles, kites, harriers and Old World vultures. These birds have powerful hooked beaks for tearing flesh from their prey, strong legs, powerful talons and keen eyesight.

- Black-winged kite, Elanus caeruleus
- Egyptian vulture, Neophron percnopterus
- Oriental honey-buzzard, Pernis ptilorhynchus
- Jerdon's baza, Aviceda jerdoni
- Black baza, Aviceda leuphotes
- Red-headed vulture, Sarcogyps calvus
- Cinereous vulture, Aegypius monachus (A)
- White-rumped vulture, Gyps bengalensis
- Slender-billed vulture, Gyps tenuirostris (A)
- Himalayan griffon, Gyps himalayensis
- Crested serpent-eagle, Spilornis cheela
- Short-toed snake-eagle, Circaetus gallicus
- Bat hawk, Macheiramphus alcinus
- Changeable hawk-eagle, Nisaetus cirrhatus
- Mountain hawk-eagle, Nisaetus nipalensis
- Blyth's hawk-eagle, Nisaetus alboniger
- Wallace's hawk-eagle, Nisaetus nanus
- Rufous-bellied eagle, Lophotriorchis kienerii
- Black eagle, Ictinaetus malaiensis
- Indian spotted eagle, Clanga hastata
- Greater spotted eagle, Clanga clanga
- Booted eagle, Hieraaetus pennatus
- Tawny eagle, Aquila rapax
- Steppe eagle, Aquila nipalensis
- Imperial eagle, Aquila heliaca
- Bonelli's eagle, Aquila fasciata
- White-eyed buzzard, Butastur teesa
- Rufous-winged buzzard, Butastur liventer
- Gray-faced buzzard, Butastur indicus
- Eurasian marsh harrier, Circus aeruginosus
- Eastern marsh harrier, Circus spilonotus
- Hen harrier, Circus cyaneus
- Pallid harrier, Circus macrourus
- Pied harrier, Circus melanoleucos
- Crested goshawk, Accipiter trivirgatus
- Shikra, Accipiter badius
- Chinese sparrowhawk, Accipiter soloensis
- Japanese sparrowhawk, Accipiter gularis
- Besra, Accipiter virgatus
- Eurasian sparrowhawk, Accipiter nisus
- Northern goshawk, Astur gentilis
- Black kite, Milvus migrans
- Brahminy kite, Haliastur indus
- White-tailed eagle, Haliaeetus albicilla
- Pallas's fish-eagle, Haliaeetus leucoryphus
- White-bellied sea-eagle, Haliaeetus leucogaster
- Lesser fish-eagle, Haliaeetus humilis
- Gray-headed fish-eagle, Haliaeetus ichthyaetus
- Common buzzard, Buteo buteo
- Himalayan buzzard, Buteo refectus
- Eastern buzzard, Buteo japonicus
- Long-legged buzzard, Buteo rufinus

== Barn-owls ==
Order: Strigiformes Family: Tytonidae

Barn-owls are medium to large owls with large heads and characteristic heart-shaped faces. They have long strong legs with powerful talons.

- Australasian grass-owl, Tyto longimembris
- Eastern barn owl, Tyto javanica
- Oriental bay-owl, Phodilus badius

== Owls ==
Order: Strigiformes Family: Strigidae

The typical owls are small to large solitary nocturnal birds of prey. They have large forward-facing eyes and ears, a hawk-like beak and a conspicuous circle of feathers around each eye called a facial disk.

- White-fronted scops-owl, Otus sagittatus
- Mountain scops-owl, Otus spilocephalus
- Collared scops-owl, Otus lettia
- Sunda scops-owl, Otus lempiji
- Oriental scops-owl, Otus sunia
- Rock eagle-owl, Bubo bengalensis
- Spot-bellied eagle-owl, Bubo nipalensis
- Barred eagle-owl, Bubo sumatranus
- Dusky eagle-owl, Bubo coromandus
- Brown fish-owl, Ketupa zeylonensis
- Tawny fish-owl, Ketupa flavipes
- Buffy fish-owl, Ketupa ketupu
- Collared owlet, Taenioptynx brodiei
- Asian barred owlet, Glaucidium cuculoides
- Jungle owlet, Glaucidium radiatum
- Spotted owlet, Athene brama
- Spotted wood-owl, Strix seloputo
- Mottled wood-owl, Strix ocellata
- Brown wood-owl, Strix leptogrammica
- Himalayan owl, Strix nivicolum
- Long-eared owl, Asio otus
- Short-eared owl, Asio flammeus
- Brown boobook, Ninox scutulata

== Trogons ==
Order: Trogoniformes Family: Trogonidae

The family Trogonidae includes trogons and quetzals. Found in tropical woodlands worldwide, they feed on insects and fruit, and their broad bills and weak legs reflect their diet and arboreal habits. Although their flight is fast, they are reluctant to fly any distance. Trogons have soft, often colourful, feathers with distinctive male and female plumage.

- Scarlet-rumped trogon, Harpactes duvaucelii
- Red-headed trogon, Harpactes erythrocephalus
- Orange-breasted trogon, Harpactes oreskios
- Ward's trogon, Harpactes wardi

== Hoopoes ==
Order: Bucerotiformes Family: Upupidae

Hoopoes have black, white and orangey-pink colouring with a large erectile crest on their head.

- Eurasian hoopoe, Upupa epops

== Hornbills ==
Order: Bucerotiformes Family: Bucerotidae

Hornbills are a group of birds whose bill is shaped like a cow's horn, but without a twist, sometimes with a casque on the upper mandible. Frequently, the bill is brightly coloured.

- White-crowned hornbill, Berenicornis comatus
- Helmeted hornbill, Buceros vigil
- Great hornbill, Buceros bicornis
- Bushy-crested hornbill, Anorrhinus galeritus
- Brown hornbill, Anorrhinus austeni
- Rusty-cheeked hornbill, Anorrhinus tickelli
- Black hornbill, Anthracoceros malayanus (A)
- Oriental pied-hornbill, Anthracoceros albirostris
- Rufous-necked hornbill, Aceros nipalensis
- Wreathed hornbill, Rhyticeros undulatus
- Plain-pouched hornbill, Rhyticeros subruficollis

== Kingfishers ==
Order: Coraciiformes Family: Alcedinidae

Kingfishers are medium-sized birds with large heads, long, pointed bills, short legs and stubby tails.

- Blyth's kingfisher, Alcedo hercules
- Common kingfisher, Alcedo atthis
- Blue-eared kingfisher, Alcedo meninting
- Malaysian blue-banded kingfisher, Alcedo peninsulae
- Black-backed dwarf-kingfisher, Ceyx erithacus
- Banded kingfisher, Lacedo pulchella
- Brown-winged kingfisher, Pelargopsis amauropterus
- Stork-billed kingfisher, Pelargopsis capensis
- Ruddy kingfisher, Halcyon coromanda
- White-throated kingfisher, Halcyon smyrnensis
- Black-capped kingfisher, Halcyon pileata
- Collared kingfisher, Todirhamphus chloris
- Rufous-collared kingfisher, Actenoides concretus
- Crested kingfisher, Megaceryle lugubris
- Pied kingfisher, Ceryle rudis

== Bee-eaters ==
Order: Coraciiformes Family: Meropidae

The bee-eaters are a group of near passerine birds in the family Meropidae. Most species are found in Africa but others occur in southern Europe, Madagascar, Australia and New Guinea. They are characterised by richly coloured plumage, slender bodies and usually elongated central tail feathers. All are colourful and have long downturned bills and pointed wings, which give them a swallow-like appearance when seen from afar.

- Red-bearded bee-eater, Nyctyornis amictus
- Blue-bearded bee-eater, Nyctyornis athertoni
- Asian green bee-eater, Merops orientalis
- Blue-throated bee-eater, Merops viridis
- Blue-tailed bee-eater, Merops philippinus
- Chestnut-headed bee-eater, Merops leschenaulti

== Rollers ==
Order: Coraciiformes Family: Coraciidae

Rollers resemble crows in size and build, but are more closely related to the kingfishers and bee-eaters. They share the colourful appearance of those groups with blues and browns predominating. The two inner front toes are connected, but the outer toe is not.

- Indochinese roller, Coracias affinis
- Dollarbird, Eurystomus orientalis

== Asian barbets ==
Order: Piciformes Family: Megalaimidae

The Asian barbets are plump birds, with short necks and large heads. They get their name from the bristles which fringe their heavy bills. Most species are brightly coloured.

- Sooty barbet, Caloramphus hayii
- Coppersmith barbet, Psilopogon haemacephalus
- Blue-eared barbet, Psilopogon duvaucelii
- Great barbet, Psilopogon virens
- Red-crowned barbet, Psilopogon rafflesii
- Red-throated barbet, Psilopogon mystacophanos
- Green-eared barbet, Psilopogon faiostrictus
- Lineated barbet, Psilopogon lineatus
- Golden-throated barbet, Psilopogon franklinii
- Gold-whiskered barbet, Psilopogon chrysopogon
- Moustached barbet, Psilopogon incognitus
- Blue-throated barbet, Psilopogon asiaticus

== Honeyguides ==
Order: Piciformes Family: Indicatoridae

Honeyguides are among the few birds that feed on wax. They are named for the greater honeyguide which leads traditional honey-hunters to bees' nests and, after the hunters have harvested the honey, feeds on the remaining contents of the hive.

- Yellow-rumped honeyguide, Indicator xanthonotus

== Woodpeckers ==
Order: Piciformes Family: Picidae

Woodpeckers are small to medium-sized birds with chisel-like beaks, short legs, stiff tails and long tongues used for capturing insects. Some species have feet with two toes pointing forward and two backward, while several species have only three toes. Many woodpeckers have the habit of tapping noisily on tree trunks with their beaks.

- Eurasian wryneck, Jynx torquilla
- Speckled piculet, Picumnus innominatus
- Rufous piculet, Sasia abnormis
- White-browed piculet, Sasia ochracea
- Gray-and-buff woodpecker, Hemicircus concretus
- Heart-spotted woodpecker, Hemicircus canente
- Gray-capped pygmy woodpecker, Yungipicus canicapillus
- Yellow-crowned woodpecker, Leiopicus mahrattensis
- Rufous-bellied woodpecker, Dendrocopos hyperythrus
- Fulvous-breasted woodpecker, Dendrocopos macei
- Freckle-breasted woodpecker, Dendrocopos analis
- Stripe-breasted woodpecker, Dendrocopos atratus
- Darjeeling woodpecker, Dendrocopos darjellensis
- Great spotted woodpecker, Dendrocopos major
- Crimson-breasted woodpecker, Dryobates cathpharius
- Maroon woodpecker, Blythipicus rubiginosus
- Bay woodpecker, Blythipicus pyrrhotis
- Greater flameback, Chrysocolaptes guttacristatus
- Rufous woodpecker, Micropternus brachyurus
- Buff-necked woodpecker, Meiglyptes tukki
- Buff-rumped woodpecker, Meiglyptes tristis
- Black-and-buff woodpecker, Meiglyptes jugularis
- Pale-headed woodpecker, Gecinulus grantia
- Bamboo woodpecker, Gecinulus viridis
- Olive-backed woodpecker, Dinopium rafflesii
- Himalayan flameback, Dinopium shorii
- Common flameback, Dinopium javanense
- Black-rumped flameback, Dinopium benghalense
- Lesser yellownape, Picus chlorolophus
- Crimson-winged woodpecker, Picus puniceus
- Streak-throated woodpecker, Picus xanthopygaeus
- Streak-breasted woodpecker, Picus viridanus
- Laced woodpecker, Picus vittatus
- Gray-headed woodpecker, Picus canus
- Black-headed woodpecker, Picus erythropygius
- Banded woodpecker, Chrysophlegma mineaceum
- Greater yellownape, Chrysophlegma flavinucha
- Checker-throated woodpecker, Chrysophlegma mentale
- Great slaty woodpecker, Mulleripicus pulverulentus
- White-bellied woodpecker, Dryocopus javensis

== Falcons and caracaras ==
Order: Falconiformes Family: Falconidae

Falconidae is a family of diurnal birds of prey. They differ from hawks, eagles and kites in that they kill with their beaks instead of their talons.

- White-rumped falcon, Polihierax insignis
- Collared falconet, Microhierax caerulescens
- Black-thighed falconet, Microhierax fringillarius
- Pied falconet, Microhierax melanoleucos (A)
- Lesser kestrel, Falco naumanni
- Eurasian kestrel, Falco tinnunculus
- Amur falcon, Falco amurensis
- Merlin, Falco columbarius (A)
- Eurasian hobby, Falco subbuteo
- Oriental hobby, Falco severus
- Laggar falcon, Falco jugger
- Peregrine falcon, Falco peregrinus

== Old World parrots ==
Order: Psittaciformes Family: Psittaculidae

Characteristic features of parrots include a strong curved bill, an upright stance, strong legs, and clawed zygodactyl feet. Many parrots are vividly coloured, and some are multi-coloured. In size they range from 8 cm (3.1 in) to 1 m (3.3 ft) in length. Old World parrots are found from Africa east across south and southeast Asia and Oceania to Australia and New Zealand.

- Blue-rumped parrot, Psittinus cyanurus
- Alexandrine parakeet, Psittacula eupatria
- Rose-ringed parakeet, Psittacula krameri
- Gray-headed parakeet, Psittacula finschii
- Blossom-headed parakeet, Psittacula roseata
- Red-breasted parakeet, Psittacula alexandri
- Long-tailed parakeet, Psittacula longicauda
- Vernal hanging-parrot, Loriculus vernalis

== African and green broadbills ==
Order: Passeriformes Family: Calyptomenidae

The African and green broadbills are small, brightly coloured birds, which feed on fruit and also take insects in flycatcher fashion, snapping their broad bills. Their habitat is canopies of wet forests

- Green broadbill, Calyptomena viridis

== Asian and Grauer's broadbills ==
Order: Passeriformes Family: Eurylaimidae

Many of the species are brightly coloured birds that present broad heads, large eyes and a hooked, flat and broad beak.

- Black-and-red broadbill, Cymbirhynchus macrorhynchos
- Long-tailed broadbill, Psarisomus dalhousiae
- Silver-breasted broadbill, Serilophus lunatus
- Banded broadbill, Eurylaimus javanicus
- Black-and-yellow broadbill, Eurylaimus ochromalus
- Dusky broadbill, Corydon sumatranus

== Pittas ==
Order: Passeriformes Family: Pittidae

Pittas are medium-sized by passerine standards and are stocky, with fairly long, strong legs, short tails and stout bills. Many are brightly coloured. They spend the majority of their time on wet forest floors, eating snails, insects and similar invertebrates.

- Garnet pitta, Erythropitta granatina
- Eared pitta, Hydrornis phayrei
- Rusty-naped pitta, Hydrornis oatesi
- Blue-naped pitta, Hydrornis nipalensis
- Giant pitta, Hydrornis caerulea
- Blue pitta, Hydrornis cyanea
- Gurney's pitta, Hydrornis gurneyi (E)
- Indian pitta, Pitta brachyura
- Blue-winged pitta, Pitta moluccensis
- Fairy pitta, Pitta nympha
- Hooded pitta, Pitta sordida
- Mangrove pitta, Pitta megarhyncha

== Thornbills and allies ==
Order: Passeriformes Family: Acanthizidae

The Acanthizidae are small- to medium-sized birds with short rounded wings, slender bills, long legs, and a short tail. The golden-bellied gerygone is the only member of the family found in mainland Asia.

- Golden-bellied gerygone, Gerygone sulphurea (A)

== Cuckooshrikes ==
Order: Passeriformes Family: Campephagidae

The cuckooshrikes are small to medium-sized passerine birds. They are predominantly greyish with white and black, although some species are brightly coloured.

- Jerdon's minivet, Pericrocotus albifrons (E)
- Fiery minivet, Pericrocotus igneus
- Small minivet, Pericrocotus cinnamomeus
- Gray-chinned minivet, Pericrocotus solaris
- Short-billed minivet, Pericrocotus brevirostris
- Long-tailed minivet, Pericrocotus ethologus
- Scarlet minivet, Pericrocotus flammeus
- Ashy minivet, Pericrocotus divaricatus
- Brown-rumped minivet, Pericrocotus cantonensis
- Rosy minivet, Pericrocotus roseus
- Large cuckooshrike, Coracina macei
- Black-winged cuckooshrike, Lalage melaschistos
- Black-headed cuckooshrike, Lalage melanoptera
- Lesser cuckooshrike, Lalage fimbriata
- Indochinese cuckooshrike, Lalage polioptera

== Vireos, shrike-babblers, and erpornis ==
Order: Passeriformes Family: Vireonidae

Most of the members of this family are found in the New World. However, the shrike-babblers and erpornis, which only slightly resemble the "true" vireos and greenlets, are found in South East Asia.

- Black-headed shrike-babbler, Pteruthius rufiventer
- White-browed shrike-babbler, Pteruthius aeralatus
- Green shrike-babbler, Pteruthius xanthochlorus
- Black-eared shrike-babbler, Pteruthius melanotis
- Clicking shrike-babbler, Pteruthius intermedius
- White-bellied erpornis, Erpornis zantholeuca

== Whistlers and allies ==
Order: Passeriformes Family: Pachycephalidae

The family Pachycephalidae includes the whistlers, shrikethrushes, and some of the pitohuis.

- Mangrove whistler, Pachycephala cinerea

== Old World orioles ==
Order: Passeriformes Family: Oriolidae

The Old World orioles are colourful passerine birds. They are not related to the New World orioles.

- Dark-throated oriole, Oriolus xanthonotus
- Black-naped oriole, Oriolus chinensis
- Slender-billed oriole, Oriolus tenuirostris
- Black-hooded oriole, Oriolus xanthornus
- Maroon oriole, Oriolus traillii

== Woodswallows, bellmagpies, and allies ==
Order: Passeriformes Family: Artamidae

The woodswallows are soft-plumaged, somber-coloured passerine birds. They are smooth, agile flyers with moderately large, semi-triangular wings.

- Ashy woodswallow, Artamus fuscus
- White-breasted woodswallow, Artamus leucorynchus

== Vangas, helmetshrikes, and allies ==
Order: Passeriformes Family: Vangidae

The family Vangidae is highly variable, though most members of it resemble true shrikes to some degree.

- Large woodshrike, Tephrodornis gularis
- Common woodshrike, Tephrodornis pondicerianus
- Bar-winged flycatcher-shrike, Hemipus picatus
- Rufous-winged philentoma, Philentoma pyrhopterum
- Maroon-breasted philentoma, Philentoma velatum

== Ioras ==
Order: Passeriformes Family: Aegithinidae

The ioras are bulbul-like birds of open forest or thorn scrub, but whereas that group tends to be drab in colouration, ioras are sexually dimorphic, with the males being brightly plumaged in yellows and greens.

- Common iora, Aegithina tiphia
- Green iora, Aegithina viridissima
- Great iora, Aegithina lafresnayei

== Fantails ==
Order: Passeriformes Family: Rhipiduridae

The fantails are small insectivorous birds which are specialist aerial feeders.

- Malaysian pied-fantail, Rhipidura javanica
- White-throated fantail, Rhipidura albicollis
- White-browed fantail, Rhipidura aureola

== Drongos ==
Order: Passeriformes Family: Dicruridae

The drongos are mostly black or dark grey in colour, sometimes with metallic tints. They have long forked tails, and some Asian species have elaborate tail decorations. They have short legs and sit very upright when perched, like a shrike. They flycatch or take prey from the ground.

- Black drongo, Dicrurus macrocercus
- Ashy drongo, Dicrurus leucophaeus
- Crow-billed drongo, Dicrurus annectens
- Bronzed drongo, Dicrurus aeneus
- Lesser racket-tailed drongo, Dicrurus remifer
- Hair-crested drongo, Dicrurus hottentottus
- Andaman drongo, Dicrurus andamanensis
- Greater racket-tailed drongo, Dicrurus paradiseus

== Monarch flycatchers ==
Order: Passeriformes Family: Monarchidae

The monarch flycatchers are small to medium-sized insectivorous passerines which hunt by flycatching.

- Black-naped monarch, Hypothymis azurea
- Amur paradise-flycatcher, Terpsiphone incei
- Blyth's paradise-flycatcher, Terpsiphone affinis
- Indian paradise-flycatcher, Terpsiphone paradisi

== Crested shrikejay ==
Order: Passeriformes Family: Platylophidae

Until 2018 this species was included in family Corvidae, but genetic and morphological evidence place it in its own family.

- Crested shrikejay, Platylophus galericulatus

== Shrikes ==
Order: Passeriformes Family: Laniidae

Shrikes are passerine birds known for their habit of catching other birds and small animals and impaling the uneaten portions of their bodies on thorns. A typical shrike's beak is hooked, like a bird of prey.

- Tiger shrike, Lanius tigrinus
- Brown shrike, Lanius cristatus
- Burmese shrike, Lanius collurioides
- Long-tailed shrike, Lanius schach
- Gray-backed shrike, Lanius tephronotus

== Crows, jays, and magpies ==
Order: Passeriformes Family: Corvidae

The family Corvidae includes crows, ravens, jays, choughs, magpies, treepies, nutcrackers and ground jays. Corvids are above average in size among the Passeriformes, and some of the larger species show high levels of intelligence.

- Black magpie, Platysmurus leucopterus
- Eurasian jay, Garrulus glandarius
- Yellow-billed blue-magpie, Urocissa flavirostris
- Red-billed blue-magpie, Urocissa erythrorhyncha
- Common green-magpie, Cissa chinensis
- Rufous treepie, Dendrocitta vagabunda
- Gray treepie, Dendrocitta formosae
- Collared treepie, Dendrocitta frontalis
- Racket-tailed treepie, Crypsirina temia
- Hooded treepie, Crypsirina cucullata (E)
- Ratchet-tailed treepie, Temnurus temnurus
- Oriental magpie, Pica serica
- Eurasian magpie, Pica pica
- Eurasian nutcracker, Nucifraga caryocatactes
- House crow, Corvus splendens
- Large-billed crow, Corvus macrorhynchos

== Fairy flycatchers ==
Order: Passeriformes Family: Stenostiridae

Most of the species of this small family are found in Africa, though a few inhabit tropical Asia. They are not closely related to other birds called "flycatchers".

- Yellow-bellied fairy-fantail, Chelidorhynx hypoxanthus
- Gray-headed canary-flycatcher, Culicicapa ceylonensis

== Tits, chickadees, and titmice ==
Order: Passeriformes Family: Paridae

The Paridae are mainly small stocky woodland species with short stout bills. Some have crests. They are adaptable birds, with a mixed diet including seeds and insects.

- Fire-capped tit, Cephalopyrus flammiceps
- Yellow-browed tit, Sylviparus modestus
- Sultan tit, Melanochlora sultanea
- Coal tit, Periparus ater
- Rufous-vented tit, Periparus rubidiventris
- Gray-crested tit, Lophophanes dichrous
- Marsh tit, Poecile palustris
- Black-bibbed tit, Poecile hypermelaneus
- Green-backed tit, Parus monticolus
- Cinereous tit, Parus cinereus
- Japanese tit, Parus minor
- Yellow-cheeked tit, Parus spilonotus

== Larks ==
Order: Passeriformes Family: Alaudidae

Larks are small terrestrial birds with often extravagant songs and display flights. Most larks are fairly dull in appearance. Their food is insects and seeds.

- Horsfield's bushlark, Mirafra javanica
- Burmese bushlark, Mirafra microptera (E)
- Bengal bushlark, Mirafra assamica
- Indochinese bushlark, Mirafra erythrocephala
- Mongolian short-toed lark, Calandrella dukhunensis
- Asian short-toed lark, Alaudala cheleensis
- Sand lark, Alaudala raytal
- Oriental skylark, Alauda gulgula

== Cisticolas and allies ==
Order: Passeriformes Family: Cisticolidae

The Cisticolidae are warblers found mainly in warmer southern regions of the Old World. They are generally very small birds of drab brown or grey appearance found in open country such as grassland or scrub.

- Common tailorbird, Orthotomus sutorius
- Dark-necked tailorbird, Orthotomus atrogularis
- Ashy tailorbird, Orthotomus ruficeps
- Rufous-tailed tailorbird, Orthotomus sericeus
- Himalayan prinia, Prinia crinigera
- Burmese prinia, Prinia cooki
- Black-throated prinia, Prinia atrogularis
- Hill prinia, Prinia superciliaris
- Rufescent prinia, Prinia rufescens
- Gray-breasted prinia, Prinia hodgsonii
- Yellow-bellied prinia, Prinia flaviventris
- Plain prinia, Prinia inornata
- Zitting cisticola, Cisticola juncidis
- Golden-headed cisticola, Cisticola exilis

== Reed warblers and allies ==
Order: Passeriformes Family: Acrocephalidae

The members of this family are usually rather large for "warblers". Most are rather plain olivaceous brown above with much yellow to beige below. They are usually found in open woodland, reedbeds, or tall grass. The family occurs mostly in southern to western Eurasia and surroundings, but it also ranges far into the Pacific, with some species in Africa.

- Thick-billed warbler, Arundinax aedon
- Booted warbler, Iduna caligata (A)
- Black-browed reed warbler, Acrocephalus bistrigiceps
- Paddyfield warbler, Acrocephalus agricola
- Blunt-winged warbler, Acrocephalus concinens
- Manchurian reed warbler, Acrocephalus tangorum (A)
- Blyth's reed warbler, Acrocephalus dumetorum
- Oriental reed warbler, Acrocephalus orientalis
- Clamorous reed warbler, Acrocephalus stentoreus

== Grassbirds and allies ==
Order: Passeriformes Family: Locustellidae

Locustellidae are a family of small insectivorous songbirds found mainly in Eurasia, Africa, and the Australian region. They are smallish birds with tails that are usually long and pointed, and tend to be drab brownish or buffy all over.

- Striated grassbird, Megalurus palustris
- Pallas's grasshopper warbler, Helopsaltes certhiola
- Lanceolated warbler, Locustella lanceolata
- Brown bush warbler, Locustella luteoventris
- Chinese bush warbler, Locustella tacsanowskia
- Baikal bush warbler, Locustella davidi
- Spotted bush warbler, Locustella thoracica
- Russet bush warbler, Locustella mandelli
- Dalat bush warbler, Locustella idonea

== Cupwings ==
Order: Passeriformes Family: Pnoepygidae

The members of this small family are found in mountainous parts of South and South East Asia.

- Scaly-breasted cupwing, Pnoepyga albiventer
- Pygmy cupwing, Pnoepyga pusilla

== Swallows ==
Order: Passeriformes Family: Hirundinidae

The family Hirundinidae is adapted to aerial feeding. They have a slender streamlined body, long pointed wings and a short bill with a wide gape. The feet are adapted to perching rather than walking, and the front toes are partially joined at the base.

- Gray-throated martin, Riparia chinensis
- Bank swallow, Riparia riparia
- Dusky crag-martin, Ptyonoprogne concolor
- Barn swallow, Hirundo rustica
- Wire-tailed swallow, Hirundo smithii
- Pacific swallow, Hirundo tahitica
- Red-rumped swallow, Cecropis daurica
- Striated swallow, Cecropis striolata
- Rufous-bellied swallow, Cecropis badia
- Common house-martin, Delichon urbica
- Asian house-martin, Delichon dasypus
- Nepal house-martin, Delichon nipalensis

== Bulbuls ==
Order: Passeriformes Family: Pycnonotidae

Bulbuls are medium-sized songbirds. Some are colourful with yellow, red or orange vents, cheeks, throats or supercilia, but most are drab, with uniform olive-brown to black plumage. Some species have distinct crests.

- Puff-backed bulbul, Brachypodius eutilotus
- Black-headed bulbul, Brachypodius melanocephalos
- Spectacled bulbul, Rubigula erythropthalmos
- Gray-bellied bulbul, Rubigula cyaniventris
- Scaly-breasted bulbul, Rubigula squamatus
- Black-crested bulbul, Rubigula flaviventris
- Crested finchbill, Spizixos canifrons
- Straw-headed bulbul, Pycnonotus zeylanicus
- Striated bulbul, Pycnonotus striatus
- Red-vented bulbul, Pycnonotus cafer
- Red-whiskered bulbul, Pycnonotus jocosus
- Brown-breasted bulbul, Pycnonotus xanthorrhous
- Sooty-headed bulbul, Pycnonotus aurigaster
- Stripe-throated bulbul, Pycnonotus finlaysoni
- Flavescent bulbul, Pycnonotus flavescens
- Yellow-vented bulbul, Pycnonotus goiavier
- Olive-winged bulbul, Pycnonotus plumosus
- Ayeyarwady bulbul, Pycnonotus blanfordi
- Streak-eared bulbul, Pycnonotus conradi
- Cream-vented bulbul, Pycnonotus simplex
- Red-eyed bulbul, Pycnonotus brunneus
- Hairy-backed bulbul, Tricholestes criniger
- White-throated bulbul, Alophoixus flaveolus
- Puff-throated bulbul, Alophoixus pallidus
- Ochraceous bulbul, Alophoixus ochraceus
- Gray-cheeked bulbul, Alophoixus tephrogenys
- Yellow-bellied bulbul, Alophoixus phaeocephalus
- Buff-vented bulbul, Iole olivacea
- Gray-eyed bulbul, Iole propinqua
- Olive bulbul, Iole virescens
- Black bulbul, Hypsipetes leucocephalus
- White-headed bulbul, Hypsipetes thompsoni
- Ashy bulbul, Hemixos flavala
- Mountain bulbul, Ixos mcclellandii
- Streaked bulbul, Ixos malaccensis

== Leaf warblers ==
Order: Passeriformes Family: Phylloscopidae

Leaf warblers are a family of small insectivorous birds found mostly in Eurasia and ranging into Wallacea and Africa. The species are of various sizes, often green-plumaged above and yellow below, or more subdued with greyish-green to greyish-brown colours.

- Ashy-throated warbler, Phylloscopus maculipennis
- Buff-barred warbler, Phylloscopus pulcher
- Yellow-browed warbler, Phylloscopus inornatus
- Hume's warbler, Phylloscopus humei
- Chinese leaf warbler, Phylloscopus yunnanensis
- Pallas's leaf warbler, Phylloscopus proregulus
- Lemon-rumped warbler, Phylloscopus chloronotus
- Sichuan leaf warbler, Phylloscopus forresti
- Tytler's leaf warbler, Phylloscopus tytleri
- Radde's warbler, Phylloscopus schwarzi
- Yellow-streaked warbler, Phylloscopus armandii
- Tickell's leaf warbler, Phylloscopus affinis
- Dusky warbler, Phylloscopus fuscatus
- Smoky warbler, Phylloscopus fuligiventer
- Buff-throated warbler, Phylloscopus subaffinis
- Common chiffchaff, Phylloscopus collybita (A)
- Eastern crowned warbler, Phylloscopus coronatus
- White-spectacled warbler, Phylloscopus affinis
- Gray-cheeked warbler, Phylloscopus poliogenys
- Green-crowned warbler, Phylloscopus burkii
- Gray-crowned warbler, Phylloscopus tephrocephalus
- Whistler's warbler, Phylloscopus whistleri
- Bianchi's warbler, Phylloscopus valentini
- Martens's warbler, Phylloscopus omeiensis
- Alström's warbler, Phylloscopus soror
- Greenish warbler, Phylloscopus trochiloides
- Two-barred warbler, Phylloscopus plumbeitarsus
- Large-billed leaf warbler, Phylloscopus magnirostris
- Pale-legged leaf warbler, Phylloscopus tenellipes
- Sakhalin leaf warbler, Phylloscopus borealoides
- Arctic warbler, Phylloscopus borealis
- Chestnut-crowned warbler, Phylloscopus castaniceps
- Yellow-vented warbler, Phylloscopus cantator
- Sulphur-breasted warbler, Phylloscopus ricketti
- Blyth's leaf warbler, Phylloscopus reguloides
- Claudia's leaf warbler, Phylloscopus claudiae
- Gray-hooded warbler, Phylloscopus xanthoschistos
- Davison's leaf warbler, Phylloscopus intensior
- Kloss's leaf warbler, Phylloscopus ogilviegranti

== Bush warblers and allies ==
Order: Passeriformes Family: Scotocercidae

The members of this family are found throughout Africa, Asia, and Polynesia. Their taxonomy is in flux, and some authorities place some genera in other families.

- Pale-footed bush warbler, Urosphena pallidipes
- Asian stubtail, Urosphena squameiceps
- Gray-bellied tesia, Tesia cyaniventer
- Slaty-bellied tesia, Tesia olivea
- Chestnut-crowned bush warbler, Cettia major
- Gray-sided bush warbler, Cettia brunnifrons
- Chestnut-headed tesia, Cettia castaneocoronata
- Yellow-bellied warbler, Abroscopus superciliaris
- Rufous-faced warbler, Abroscopus albogularis
- Black-faced warbler, Abroscopus schisticeps
- Mountain tailorbird, Phyllergates cuculatus
- Broad-billed warbler, Tickellia hodgsoni
- Brownish-flanked bush warbler, Horornis fortipes
- Hume's bush warbler, Horornis brunnescens
- Yellowish-bellied bush warbler, Horornis acanthizoides
- Aberrant bush warbler, Horornis flavolivaceus

== Long-tailed tits ==
Order: Passeriformes Family: Aegithalidae

Long-tailed tits are a group of small passerine birds with medium to long tails. They make woven bag nests in trees. Most eat a mixed diet which includes insects.

- Black-throated tit, Aegithalos concinnus
- Black-browed tit, Aegithalos iouschistos

== Sylviid warblers, parrotbills, and allies ==
Order: Passeriformes Family: Sylviidae

The family Sylviidae is a group of small insectivorous passerine birds. They mainly occur as breeding species, as the common name implies, in Europe, Asia and, to a lesser extent, Africa. Most are of generally undistinguished appearance, but many have distinctive songs.

- Fire-tailed myzornis, Myzornis pyrrhoura
- Golden-breasted fulvetta, Lioparus chrysotis
- Yellow-eyed babbler, Chrysomma sinense
- Jerdon's babbler, Chrysomma altirostre
- Brown-throated fulvetta, Fulvetta ludlowi
- White-browed fulvetta, Fulvetta vinipectus
- Streak-throated fulvetta, Fulvetta manipurensis
- Great parrotbill, Conostoma aemodium
- Brown parrotbill, Cholornis unicolor
- Gray-headed parrotbill, Psittiparus gularis
- Rufous-headed parrotbill, Psittiparus bakeri
- Black-breasted parrotbill, Paradoxornis flavirostris
- Spot-breasted parrotbill, Paradoxornis guttaticollis
- Pale-billed parrotbill, Chleuasicus atrosuperciliaris
- Vinous-throated parrotbill, Sinosuthora webbiana
- Brown-winged parrotbill, Sinosuthora brunnea
- Fulvous parrotbill, Suthora fulvifrons
- Black-throated parrotbill, Suthora nipalensis
- Golden parrotbill, Suthora verreauxi
- Short-tailed parrotbill, Neosuthora davidiana

== White-eyes, yuhinas, and allies ==
Order: Passeriformes Family: Zosteropidae

The white-eyes are small and mostly undistinguished, their plumage above being generally some dull colour like greenish-olive, but some species have a white or bright yellow throat, breast or lower parts, and several have buff flanks. As their name suggests, many species have a white ring around each eye.

- White-collared yuhina, Parayuhina diademata
- Striated yuhina, Staphida castaniceps
- Indochinese yuhina, Staphida torqueola
- White-naped yuhina, Yuhina bakeri
- Whiskered yuhina, Yuhina flavicollis
- Burmese yuhina, Yuhina humilis
- Stripe-throated yuhina, Yuhina gularis
- Rufous-vented yuhina, Yuhina occipitalis
- Black-chinned yuhina, Yuhina nigrimenta
- Chestnut-flanked white-eye, Zosterops erythropleurus
- Indian white-eye, Zosterops palpebrosus
- Hume's white-eye, Zosterops auriventer
- Swinhoe's white-eye, Zosterops simplex

== Tree-babblers, scimitar-babblers, and allies ==
Order: Passeriformes Family: Timaliidae

The babblers, or timaliids, are somewhat diverse in size and colouration, but are characterised by soft fluffy plumage.

- Chestnut-capped babbler, Timalia pileata
- Pin-striped tit-babbler, Mixornis gularis
- Golden babbler, Cyanoderma chrysaeum
- Chestnut-winged babbler, Cyanoderma erythropterum
- Rufous-capped babbler, Cyanoderma ruficeps
- Buff-chested babbler, Cyanoderma ambiguum
- Rufous-fronted babbler, Cyanoderma rufifrons
- Bar-winged wren-babbler, Spelaeornis troglodytoides
- Chin Hills wren-babbler, Spelaeornis oatesi
- Gray-bellied wren-babbler, Spelaeornis reptatus
- Red-billed scimitar-babbler, Pomatorhinus ochraceiceps
- Coral-billed scimitar-babbler, Pomatorhinus ferruginosus
- Slender-billed scimitar-babbler, Pomatorhinus superciliaris
- Streak-breasted scimitar-babbler, Pomatorhinus ruficollis
- White-browed scimitar-babbler, Pomatorhinus schisticeps
- Large scimitar babbler, Megapomatorhinus hypoleucos
- Red-eyed scimitar babbler, Erythrogenys imberbis
- Spot-breasted scimitar babbler, Megapomatorhinus mcclellandi
- Black-streaked scimitar babbler, Megapomatorhinus gravivox
- Gray-throated babbler, Stachyris nigriceps
- Snowy-throated babbler, Stachyris oglei
- Spot-necked babbler, Stachyris striolata
- Cachar wedge-billed babbler, Stachyris roberti

== Ground babblers and allies ==
Order: Passeriformes Family: Pellorneidae

These small to medium-sized songbirds have soft fluffy plumage but are otherwise rather diverse. Members of the genus Illadopsis are found in forests, but some other genera are birds of scrublands.

- Moustached babbler, Malacopteron magnirostre
- Rufous-crowned babbler, Malacopteron magnum
- White-hooded babbler, Gampsorhynchus rufulus
- Collared babbler, Gampsorhynchus torquatus
- Yellow-throated fulvetta, Schoeniparus cinereus
- Rufous-winged fulvetta, Schoeniparus castaneceps
- Rufous-throated fulvetta, Schoeniparus rufogularis
- Dusky fulvetta, Schoeniparus brunneus
- Rusty-capped fulvetta, Schoeniparus dubius (E)
- Puff-throated babbler, Pellorneum ruficeps
- Black-capped babbler, Pellorneum capistratum
- Spot-throated babbler, Pellorneum albiventre
- Buff-breasted babbler, Pellorneum tickelli
- Short-tailed babbler, Pellorneum malaccense
- White-chested babbler, Pellorneum rostratum
- Ferruginous babbler, Pellorneum bicolor
- Eyebrowed wren-babbler, Napothera epilepidota
- Naung Mung scimitar-babbler, Napothera naungmungensis (E)
- Long-billed wren-babbler, Napothera malacoptila
- Abbott's babbler, Malacocincla abbotti
- Variable limestone babbler, Gypsophila crispifrons
- Streaked wren-babbler, Gypsophila brevicaudatus
- Indian grassbird, Graminicola bengalensis
- Chinese grassbird, Graminicola striatus

== Laughingthrushes and allies ==
Order: Passeriformes Family: Leiothrichidae

The members of this family are diverse in size and colouration, though those of genus Turdoides tend to be brown or greyish. The family is found in Africa, India, and southeast Asia.

- Brown-cheeked fulvetta, Alcippe poioicephala
- Yunnan fulvetta, Alcippe fratercula
- Nepal fulvetta, Alcippe nipalensis
- Striated laughingthrush, Grammatoptila striata
- Himalayan cutia, Cutia nipalensis
- Striated babbler, Argya earlei
- White-throated babbler, Argya gularis (E)
- Slender-billed babbler, Argya longirostris
- White-crested laughingthrush, Garrulax leucolophus
- Lesser necklaced laughingthrush, Garrulax monileger
- White-necked laughingthrush, Garrulax strepitans
- Spot-breasted laughingthrush, Garrulax merulinus
- Moustached laughingthrush, Ianthocincla cineracea
- Rufous-chinned laughingthrush, Ianthocincla rufogularis
- Spotted laughingthrush, Ianthocincla ocellata
- Greater necklaced laughingthrush, Pterorhinus pectoralis
- White-throated laughingthrush, Pterorhinus albogularis (A)
- Rufous-necked laughingthrush, Pterorhinus ruficollis
- Chestnut-backed laughingthrush, Pterorhinus nuchalis
- Black-throated laughingthrush, Pterorhinus chinensis
- Yellow-throated laughingthrush, Pterorhinus galbanus
- Rufous-vented laughingthrush, Pterorhinus gularis
- Gray-sided laughingthrush, Pterorhinus caerulatus
- White-browed laughingthrush, Pterorhinus sannio
- Chinese babax, Pterorhinus lanceolatus
- Mount Victoria babax, Pterorhinus woodi
- Striped laughingthrush, Trochalopteron virgatus
- Scaly laughingthrush, Trochalopteron subunicolor
- Brown-capped laughingthrush, Trochalopteron austeni
- Blue-winged laughingthrush, Trochalopteron squamatum
- Black-faced laughingthrush, Trochalopteron affine
- Chestnut-crowned laughingthrush, Trochalopteron erythrocephalum
- Assam laughingthrush, Trochalopteron chrysopterum
- Silver-eared laughingthrush, Trochalopteron melanostigma
- Red-tailed laughingthrush, Trochalopteron milnei
- Gray sibia, Heterophasia gracilis
- Black-backed sibia, Heterophasia melanoleuca
- Black-headed sibia, Heterophasia desgodinsi
- Beautiful sibia, Heterophasia pulchella
- Long-tailed sibia, Heterophasia picaoides
- Silver-eared mesia, Leiothrix argentauris
- Red-billed leiothrix, Leiothrix lutea
- Red-tailed minla, Minla ignotincta
- Rufous-backed sibia, Leioptila annectens
- Red-faced liocichla, Liocichla phoenicea
- Scarlet-faced liocichla, Liocichla ripponi
- Hoary-throated barwing, Actinodura nipalensis
- Streak-throated barwing, Actinodura waldeni
- Rusty-fronted barwing, Actinodura egertoni
- Spectacled barwing, Actinodura ramsayi
- Blue-winged minla, Actinodura cyanouroptera
- Chestnut-tailed minla, Actinodura strigula

== Kinglets ==
Order: Passeriformes Family: Regulidae

The kinglets, also called crests, are a small group of birds often included in the Old World warblers, but frequently given family status because they also resemble the titmice.

- Goldcrest, Regulus regulus

== Nuthatches ==
Order: Passeriformes Family: Sittidae

Nuthatches are small woodland birds. They have the unusual ability to climb down trees head first, unlike other birds which can only go upwards. Nuthatches have big heads, short tails and powerful bills and feet.

- Chestnut-bellied nuthatch, Sitta castanea
- Burmese nuthatch, Sitta neglecta
- Chestnut-vented nuthatch, Sitta nagaensis
- White-tailed nuthatch, Sitta himalayensis
- White-browed nuthatch, Sitta victoriae (E)
- Velvet-fronted nuthatch, Sitta frontalis
- Giant nuthatch, Sitta magna
- Beautiful nuthatch, Sitta formosa

== Treecreepers ==
Order: Passeriformes Family: Certhiidae

Treecreepers are small woodland birds, brown above and white below. They have thin pointed down-curved bills, which they use to extricate insects from bark. They have stiff tail feathers, like woodpeckers, which they use to support themselves on vertical trees.

- Hodgson's treecreeper, Certhia hodgsoni
- Bar-tailed treecreeper, Certhia himalayana
- Rusty-flanked treecreeper, Certhia nipalensis
- Hume's treecreeper, Certhia manipurensis

== Wrens ==
Order: Passeriformes Family: Troglodytidae

The wrens are mainly small and inconspicuous except for their loud songs. These birds have short wings and thin down-turned bills. Several species often hold their tails upright. All are insectivorous.

- Eurasian wren, Troglodytes troglodytes

== Spotted elachura ==
Order: Passeriformes Family: Elachuridae

This species, the only one in its family, inhabits forest undergrowth throughout South East Asia.

- Spotted elachura, Elachura formosa

== Dippers ==
Order: Passeriformes Family: Cinclidae

Dippers are a group of perching birds whose habitat includes aquatic environments in the Americas, Europe and Asia. They are named for their bobbing or dipping movements.

- White-throated dipper, Cinclus cinclus
- Brown dipper, Cinclus pallasii

== Starlings ==
Order: Passeriformes Family: Sturnidae

Starlings are small to medium-sized passerine birds. Their flight is strong and direct and they are very gregarious. Their preferred habitat is fairly open country. They eat insects and fruit. Plumage is typically dark with a metallic sheen.

- Asian glossy starling, Aplonis panayensis
- Golden-crested myna, Ampeliceps coronatus
- Common hill myna, Gracula religiosa
- European starling, Sturnus vulgaris
- Rosy starling, Pastor roseus (A)
- Daurian starling, Agropsar sturninus
- Black-collared starling, Gracupica nigricollis
- Indian pied starling, Gracupica contra
- Siamese pied starling, Gracupica floweri
- White-shouldered starling, Sturnia sinensis (A)
- Brahminy starling, Sturnia pagodarum (A)
- Chestnut-tailed starling, Sturnia malabarica
- White-cheeked starling, Spodiopsar cineraceus
- Common myna, Acridotheres tristis
- Burmese myna, Acridotheres burmannicus
- Vinous-breasted myna, Acridotheres leucocephalus
- Black-winged myna, Acridotheres melanopterus (A)
- Jungle myna, Acridotheres fuscus
- Javan myna, Acridotheres javanicus (I)
- Collared myna, Acridotheres albocinctus
- Great myna, Acridotheres grandis
- Crested myna, Acridotheres cristatellus
- Spot-winged starling, Saroglossa spilopterus

== Thrushes and allies ==
Order: Passeriformes Family: Turdidae

The thrushes are a group of passerine birds that occur mainly in the Old World. They are plump, soft plumaged, small to medium-sized insectivores or sometimes omnivores, often feeding on the ground. Many have attractive songs.

- Grandala, Grandala coelicolor
- Long-tailed thrush, Zoothera dixoni
- Alpine thrush, Zoothera mollissima
- Himalayan thrush, Zoothera salimalii
- Dark-sided thrush, Zoothera marginata
- Long-billed thrush, Zoothera monticola
- White's thrush, Zoothera aurea (A)
- Scaly thrush, Zoothera dauma
- Purple cochoa, Cochoa purpurea
- Green cochoa, Cochoa viridis
- Siberian thrush, Geokichla sibirica
- Orange-headed thrush, Geokichla citrina
- Song thrush, Turdus philomelos (A)
- Chinese blackbird, Turdus mandarinus
- Gray-winged blackbird, Turdus boulboul
- Japanese thrush, Turdus cardis (A)
- Black-breasted thrush, Turdus dissimilis
- Gray-sided thrush, Turdus feae
- Eyebrowed thrush, Turdus obscurus
- White-collared blackbird, Turdus albocinctus
- Chestnut thrush, Turdus rubrocanus
- Black-throated thrush, Turdus atrogularis
- Red-throated thrush, Turdus ruficollis
- Dusky thrush, Turdus eunomus

== Old World flycatchers ==
Order: Passeriformes Family: Muscicapidae

Old World flycatchers are a large group of small passerine birds native to the Old World. They are mainly small arboreal insectivores. The appearance of these birds is highly varied, but they mostly have weak songs and harsh calls.

- Dark-sided flycatcher, Muscicapa sibirica
- Ferruginous flycatcher, Muscicapa ferruginea
- Asian brown flycatcher, Muscicapa dauurica
- Brown-breasted flycatcher, Muscicapa muttui
- Brown-streaked flycatcher, Muscicapa williamsoni
- Oriental magpie-robin, Copsychus saularis
- White-rumped shama, Copsychus malabaricus
- White-gorgeted flycatcher, Anthipes monileger
- Rufous-browed flycatcher, Anthipes solitaris
- White-tailed flycatcher, Cyornis concretus
- Hainan blue flycatcher, Cyornis hainanus
- Pale-chinned blue flycatcher, Cyornis poliogenys
- Pale blue flycatcher, Cyornis unicolor
- Blue-throated flycatcher, Cyornis rubeculoides
- Chinese blue flycatcher, Cyornis glaucicomans
- Large blue flycatcher, Cyornis magnirostris
- Hill blue flycatcher, Cyornis whitei
- Tickell's blue flycatcher, Cyornis tickelliae
- Indochinese blue flycatcher, Cyornis sumatrensis
- Gray-chested jungle-flycatcher, Cyornis umbratilis (A)
- Fulvous-chested jungle-flycatcher, Cyornis olivaceus
- Large niltava, Niltava grandis
- Small niltava, Niltava macgrigoriae
- Rufous-bellied niltava, Niltava sundara
- Vivid niltava, Niltava vivida
- Blue-and-white flycatcher, Cyanoptila cyanomelana
- Zappey's flycatcher, Cyanoptila cumatilis
- Verditer flycatcher, Eumyias thalassina
- Rusty-bellied shortwing, Brachypteryx hyperythra
- Gould's shortwing, Brachypteryx stellata
- Lesser shortwing, Brachypteryx leucophrys
- Himalayan shortwing, Brachypteryx cruralis
- Indian blue robin, Larvivora brunnea
- Siberian blue robin, Larvivora cyane
- White-bellied redstart, Luscinia phaenicuroides
- Bluethroat, Luscinia svecica
- Blue whistling-thrush, Myophonus caeruleus
- Little forktail, Enicurus scouleri
- White-crowned forktail, Enicurus leschenaulti
- Spotted forktail, Enicurus maculatus
- Chestnut-naped forktail, Enicurus ruficapillus
- Black-backed forktail, Enicurus immaculatus
- Slaty-backed forktail, Enicurus schistaceus
- Firethroat, Calliope pectardens
- Blackthroat, Calliope obscura
- Siberian rubythroat, Calliope calliope
- Himalayan rubythroat, Calliope pectoralis
- Chinese rubythroat, Calliope tschebaiewi
- White-tailed robin, Myiomela leucura
- Red-flanked bluetail, Tarsiger cyanurus
- Himalayan bluetail, Tarsiger rufilatus
- Rufous-breasted bush-robin, Tarsiger hyperythrus
- White-browed bush-robin, Tarsiger indicus
- Golden bush-robin, Tarsiger chrysaeus
- Yellow-rumped flycatcher, Ficedula zanthopygia
- Green-backed flycatcher, Ficedula elisae
- Mugimaki flycatcher, Ficedula mugimaki
- Slaty-backed flycatcher, Ficedula hodgsonii
- Slaty-blue flycatcher, Ficedula tricolor
- Snowy-browed flycatcher, Ficedula hyperythra
- Pygmy flycatcher, Ficedula hodgsoni
- Rufous-gorgeted flycatcher, Ficedula strophiata
- Sapphire flycatcher, Ficedula sapphira
- Little pied flycatcher, Ficedula westermanni
- Ultramarine flycatcher, Ficedula superciliaris
- Taiga flycatcher, Ficedula albicilla
- Red-breasted flycatcher, Ficedula parva (A)
- Blue-fronted redstart, Phoenicurus frontalis
- Plumbeous redstart, Phoenicurus fuliginosus
- White-capped redstart, Phoenicurus leucocephalus
- Hodgson's redstart, Phoenicurus hodgsoni
- White-throated redstart, Phoenicurus schisticeps
- Black redstart, Phoenicurus ochruros
- Daurian redstart, Phoenicurus auroreus
- Chestnut-bellied rock-thrush, Monticola rufiventris
- White-throated rock-thrush, Monticola gularis
- Blue-capped rock-thrush, Monticola cinclorhyncha
- Blue rock-thrush, Monticola solitarius
- Siberian stonechat, Saxicola maurus
- Amur stonechat, Saxicola stejnegeri
- White-tailed stonechat, Saxicola leucurus
- Pied bushchat, Saxicola caprata
- Jerdon's bushchat, Saxicola jerdoni
- Gray bushchat, Saxicola ferreus

== Flowerpeckers ==
Order: Passeriformes Family: Dicaeidae

The flowerpeckers are very small, stout, often brightly coloured birds, with short tails, short thick curved bills and tubular tongues.

- Yellow-breasted flowerpecker, Prionochilus maculatus
- Thick-billed flowerpecker, Dicaeum agile
- Yellow-vented flowerpecker, Dicaeum chrysorrheum
- Yellow-bellied flowerpecker, Dicaeum melanozanthum
- Orange-bellied flowerpecker, Dicaeum trigonostigma
- Pale-billed flowerpecker, Dicaeum erythrorhynchos
- Plain flowerpecker, Dicaeum minullum
- Fire-breasted flowerpecker, Dicaeum ignipectus
- Scarlet-backed flowerpecker, Dicaeum cruentatum

== Sunbirds and spiderhunters ==
Order: Passeriformes Family: Nectariniidae

The sunbirds and spiderhunters are very small passerine birds which feed largely on nectar, although they will also take insects, especially when feeding young. Flight is fast and direct on their short wings. Most species can take nectar by hovering like a hummingbird, but usually perch to feed.

- Ruby-cheeked sunbird, Chalcoparia singalensis
- Plain sunbird, Anthreptes simplex
- Brown-throated sunbird, Anthreptes malacensis
- Red-throated sunbird, Anthreptes rhodolaema
- Purple-rumped sunbird, Leptocoma zeylonica
- Van Hasselt's sunbird, Leptocoma brasiliana
- Copper-throated sunbird, Leptocoma calcostetha
- Purple sunbird, Cinnyris asiaticus
- Olive-backed sunbird, Cinnyris jugularis
- Fire-tailed sunbird, Aethopyga ignicauda
- Black-throated sunbird, Aethopyga saturata
- Mrs. Gould's sunbird, Aethopyga gouldiae
- Green-tailed sunbird, Aethopyga nipalensis
- Crimson sunbird, Aethopyga siparaja
- Purple-naped spiderhunter, Kurochkinegramma hypogrammicum
- Long-billed spiderhunter, Arachnothera robusta
- Little spiderhunter, Arachnothera longirostra
- Yellow-eared spiderhunter, Arachnothera chrysogenys
- Spectacled spiderhunter, Arachnothera flavigaster (A)
- Streaked spiderhunter, Arachnothera magna
- Gray-breasted spiderhunter, Arachnothera modesta

== Fairy-bluebirds ==
Order: Passeriformes Family: Irenidae

The fairy-bluebirds are bulbul-like birds of open forest or thorn scrub. The males are dark-blue and the females a duller green.

- Asian fairy-bluebird, Irena puella

== Leafbirds ==
Order: Passeriformes Family: Chloropseidae

The leafbirds are small, bulbul-like birds. The males are brightly plumaged, usually in greens and yellows.

- Greater green leafbird, Chloropsis sonnerati
- Lesser green leafbird, Chloropsis cyanopogon
- Blue-winged leafbird, Chloropsis cochinchinensis
- Golden-fronted leafbird, Chloropsis aurifrons
- Orange-bellied leafbird, Chloropsis hardwickii

== Weavers and allies ==
Order: Passeriformes Family: Ploceidae

The weavers are small passerine birds related to the finches. They are seed-eating birds with rounded conical bills. The males of many species are brightly coloured, usually in red or yellow and black, some species show variation in colour only in the breeding season.

- Streaked weaver, Ploceus manyar
- Baya weaver, Ploceus philippinus
- Asian golden weaver, Ploceus hypoxanthus

== Waxbills and allies ==
Order: Passeriformes Family: Estrildidae

The estrildid finches are small passerine birds of the Old World tropics and Australasia. They are gregarious and often colonial seed eaters with short thick but pointed bills. They are all similar in structure and habits, but have wide variation in plumage colours and patterns.

- Red avadavat, Amandava amandava
- Pin-tailed parrotfinch, Erythrura prasina
- White-rumped munia, Lonchura striata
- Scaly-breasted munia, Lonchura punctulata
- White-bellied munia, Lonchura leucogastra
- Chestnut munia, Lonchura atricapilla
- White-headed munia, Lonchura maja
- Java sparrow, Padda oryzivora (I)

== Accentors ==
Order: Passeriformes Family: Prunellidae

The accentors are in the only bird family, Prunellidae, which is completely endemic to the Palearctic. They are small, fairly drab species superficially similar to sparrows.

- Alpine accentor, Prunella collaris
- Rufous-breasted accentor, Prunella strophiata
- Maroon-backed accentor, Prunella immaculata

== Old World sparrows ==
Order: Passeriformes Family: Passeridae

Old World sparrows are small passerine birds. In general, sparrows tend to be small, plump, brown or grey birds with short tails and short powerful beaks. Sparrows are seed eaters, but they also consume small insects.

- House sparrow, Passer domesticus
- Russet sparrow, Passer cinnamomeus
- Plain-backed sparrow, Passer flaveolus
- Eurasian tree sparrow, Passer montanus

== Wagtails and pipits ==
Order: Passeriformes Family: Motacillidae

Motacillidae is a family of small passerine birds with medium to long tails. They include the wagtails, longclaws and pipits. They are slender, ground feeding insectivores of open country.

- Forest wagtail, Dendronanthus indicus
- Gray wagtail, Motacilla cinerea
- Western yellow wagtail, Motacilla flava
- Eastern yellow wagtail, Motacilla tschutschensis
- Citrine wagtail, Motacilla citreola
- White wagtail, Motacilla alba
- Richard's pipit, Anthus richardi
- Paddyfield pipit, Anthus rufulus
- Long-billed pipit, Anthus similis
- Blyth's pipit, Anthus godlewskii
- Upland pipit, Anthus sylvanus (A)
- Rosy pipit, Anthus roseatus
- Tree pipit, Anthus trivialis (A)
- Olive-backed pipit, Anthus hodgsoni
- Red-throated pipit, Anthus cervinus
- American pipit, Anthus rubescens (A)

== Finches, euphonias, and allies ==
Order: Passeriformes Family: Fringillidae

Finches are seed-eating passerine birds, that are small to moderately large and have a strong beak, usually conical and in some species very large. All have twelve tail feathers and nine primaries. These birds have a bouncing flight with alternating bouts of flapping and gliding on closed wings, and most sing well.

- Brambling, Fringilla montifringilla (A)
- Collared grosbeak, Mycerobas affinis
- Spot-winged grosbeak, Mycerobas melanozanthos
- White-winged grosbeak, Mycerobas carnipes
- Yellow-billed grosbeak, Eophona migratoria (A)
- Common rosefinch, Carpodacus erythrinus
- Scarlet finch, Carpodacus sipahi
- Dark-rumped rosefinch, Carpodacus edwardsii
- Sharpe's rosefinch, Carpodacus verreauxii
- Vinaceous rosefinch, Carpodacus vinaceus
- Red-fronted rosefinch, Carpodacus puniceus (A)
- Crimson-browed finch, Carpodacus subhimachalus
- Brown bullfinch, Pyrrhula nipalensis
- Gray-headed bullfinch, Pyrrhula erythaca
- Gold-naped finch, Pyrrhoplectes epauletta
- Dark-breasted rosefinch, Procarduelis nipalensis
- Plain mountain finch, Leucosticte nemoricola
- Black-headed mountain finch, Leucosticte brandti (A)
- Yellow-breasted greenfinch, Chloris spinoides
- Black-headed greenfinch, Chloris ambigua
- Red crossbill, Loxia curvirostra
- Tibetan serin, Spinus thibetanus

== Old World buntings ==
Order: Passeriformes Family: Emberizidae

The emberizids are a large family of passerine birds. They are seed-eating birds with distinctively shaped bills. Many emberizid species have distinctive head patterns.

- Crested bunting, Emberiza lathami
- Black-headed bunting, Emberiza melanocephala (A)
- Chestnut-eared bunting, Emberiza fucata
- Rock bunting, Emberiza cia
- Godlewski's bunting, Emberiza godlewskii
- Yellow-throated bunting, Emberiza elegans
- Reed bunting, Emberiza schoeniclus (A)
- Yellow-breasted bunting, Emberiza aureola
- Little bunting, Emberiza pusilla
- Black-faced bunting, Emberiza spodocephala
- Chestnut bunting, Emberiza rutila
- Tristram's bunting, Emberiza tristrami (A)

== See also ==
- List of birds
- Lists of birds by region
