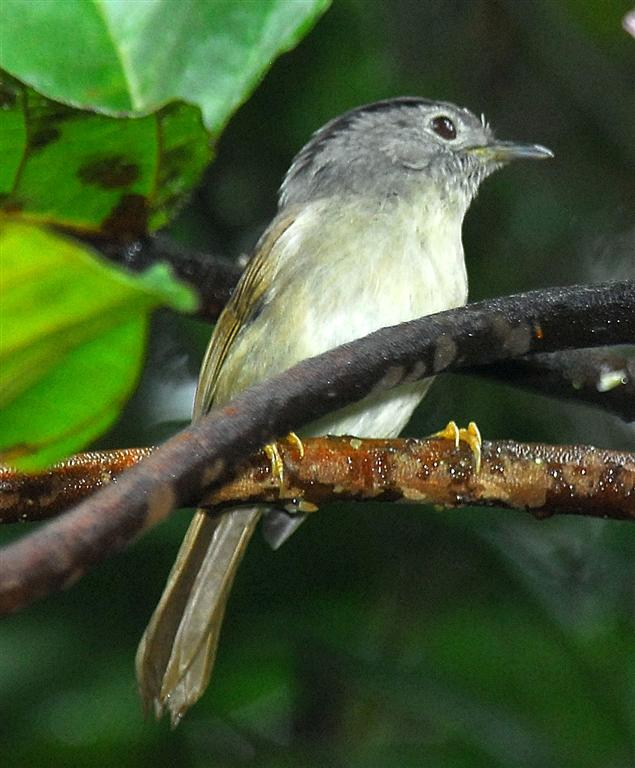
- Mountain fulvetta (Alcippe peracensis)

Scientific classification
- Kingdom: Animalia
- Phylum: Chordata
- Class: Aves
- Order: Passeriformes
- Family: Leiothrichidae
- Genus: Alcippe; Blyth, 1844

Type species
- Alcippe poioicephala (but see text)

Species
- See text

= Alcippe (bird) =

Alcippe fulvettas

Genus of birds

Alcippe is a genus of passerine birds in the family Leiothrichidae. The genus once included many other fulvettas and was previously placed in families Pellorneidae, Timaliidae and Alcippeidae.

== Taxonomy ==
The genus Alcippe was introduced in 1844 by the English zoologist Edward Blyth. He listed several species in the new genus but did not specify a type species. In 1846 the English zoologist George Gray designated the type as Trichastoma affine Blyth, 1842, now the sooty-capped babbler Malacopteron affine which is placed in the ground babbler family Pellorneidae. In spite of Gray's fixation the type was generally assumed to be Thimalia poioicephala Jerdon, the brown-cheeked fulvetta. In 1925 Harry C. Oberholser pointed out that Gray's designation of the type meant that under the rules of the International Code of Zoological Nomenclature the genus Malacopteron, should be called Alcippe and the name Alcippornis could be used for the species that were placed in Alcippe. Oberholser's view was ignored and in 1964 Herbert G. Deignan erroneously stated in the Check-list of Birds of the World that Blyth had designated the type as Thimalia poioicephala Jerdon. This same error was repeated in 2014 by Edward C. Dickinson and Leslie Christidis in the fourth edition of The Howard & Moore Complete Checklist of the Birds of the World. The genus name Alcippe is attributed to a number of figures in Greek mythology.

The genus Alcippe previously included many of the fulvettas, but recent taxonomy has seen the group progressively redefined. The Fulvetta fulvettas are now placed in family Paradoxornithidae, the bush blackcap in the genus Sylvia in the family Sylviidae, and, in the most recent revision, a group of seven species were transferred to the new genus Schoeniparus in family Pellorneidae. With the rearrangement of the species there are now birds with the common name "fulvetta" in three families: in the genera Lioparus and Fulvetta in Paradoxornithidae, Schoeniparus in Pellorneidae, and Alcippe in Leiothrichidae. The genus Alcippe was an early split from the other genera in the family Leiothrichidae.

== Species ==
The genus contains the following ten species:

Genus Alcippe – Blyth, 1844 – ten species
Common name	Scientific name and subspecies	Range	Size and ecology	IUCN status and estimated population
Brown fulvetta	Alcippe brunneicauda (Salvadori, 1879) Two subspecies: A. b. brunneicauda (Salvadori, 1879); A. b. eriphaea (Oberholser, 1922)	Brunei, Indonesia, Malaysia, and Thailand	Size: Habitat: Diet:	NT
Brown-cheeked fulvetta	Alcippe poioicephala (Jerdon, 1841) Seven subspecies: A. p. poioicephala (Jerdon, 1844[1841]) - Western Ghats and southern peninsular India; A. p. haringtoniae Hartert, 1909; A. p. fusca Godwin-Austen, 1876; A. p. alearis (Bangs and Van Tyne, 1930); A. p. karenni Robinson and Kloss, 1928; A. p. davisoni Harington, 1915	Bangladesh, India and Southeast Asia.	Size: Habitat: Diet:	LC
Javan fulvetta	Alcippe pyrrhoptera (Bonaparte, 1850) Two subspecies: A. p. annamensis Robinson, HC & Kloss, CB, 1919; A. p. peracensis Sharpe, RB, 1887	Indonesia.	Size: Habitat: Diet:	LC
Mountain fulvetta	Alcippe peracensis Sharpe, 1887	Cambodia, Laos, Malaysia, Thailand, and Vietnam	Size: Habitat: Diet:	LC
Black-browed fulvetta	Alcippe grotei Delacour, 1936 Two subspecies: A. g. eremita Riley, JH, 1936; A. g. grotei Delacour, JT, 1936	Cambodia, Laos, Thailand, and Vietnam.	Size: Habitat: Diet:	LC
Grey-cheeked fulvetta	Alcippe morrisonia R. Swinhoe, 1863	Taiwan.	Size: Habitat: Diet:	LC
David's fulvetta	Alcippe davidi Styan, 1896 Two subspecies: A. d. schaefferi La Touche, JDD, 1923; A. d. davidi Styan, FW, 1896	southern China and northern Vietnam.	Size: Habitat: Diet:	LC
Yunnan fulvetta	Alcippe fratercula Rippon, G, 1900 Three subspecies: A. f. yunnanensis Harington, HH, 1913; A. f. fratercula Rippon, G, 1900; A. f. laotiana Delacour, JT, 1926	Southern China, southeastern Myanmar and northern Indochina.	Size: Habitat: Diet:	LC
Huet's fulvetta	Alcippe hueti David, 1874 Two subspecies: A. h. hueti David, A, 1874; A. h. rufescentior (Hartert, EJO, 1910)	southeast China.	Size: Habitat: Diet:	LC
Nepal fulvetta	Alcippe nipalensis (Hodgson, 1837) Two subspecies: A. n. nipalensis (Hodgson, BH, 1837); A. n. stanfordi Ticehurst, CB, 1930	Bangladesh, Bhutan, China, India, Japan, Myanmar, Nepal, and Taiwan.	Size: Habitat: Diet:	LC
