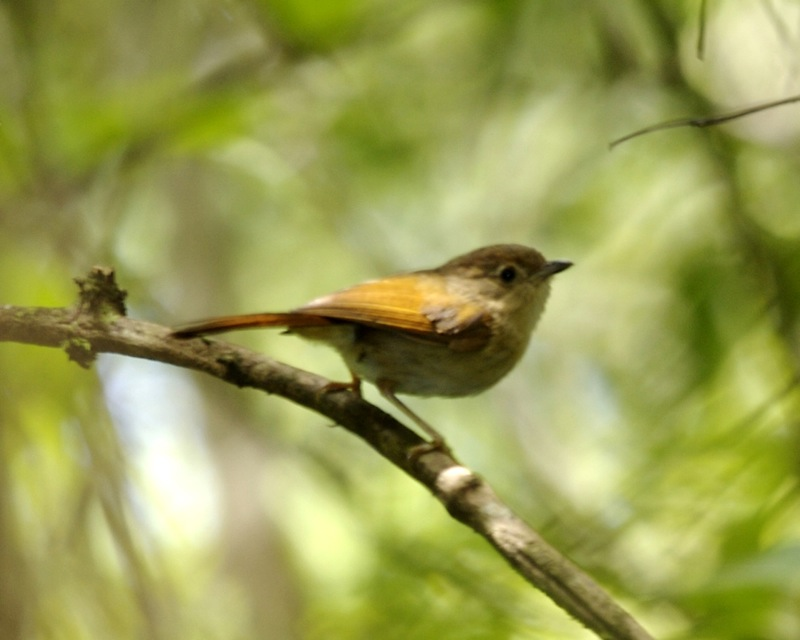

Conservation status
- Least Concern (IUCN 3.1)

Scientific classification
- Kingdom: Animalia
- Phylum: Chordata
- Class: Aves
- Order: Passeriformes
- Family: Leiothrichidae
- Genus: Alcippe
- Species: A. pyrrhoptera

Binomial name
- Alcippe pyrrhoptera (Bonaparte, 1850)

= Javan fulvetta =

Species of bird

The Javan fulvetta (Alcippe pyrrhoptera) is a species of bird in the family Leiothrichidae. It is endemic to Indonesia.

Its natural habitat is subtropical or tropical moist montane forest. The species is monotypic: no subspecies are recognised.
