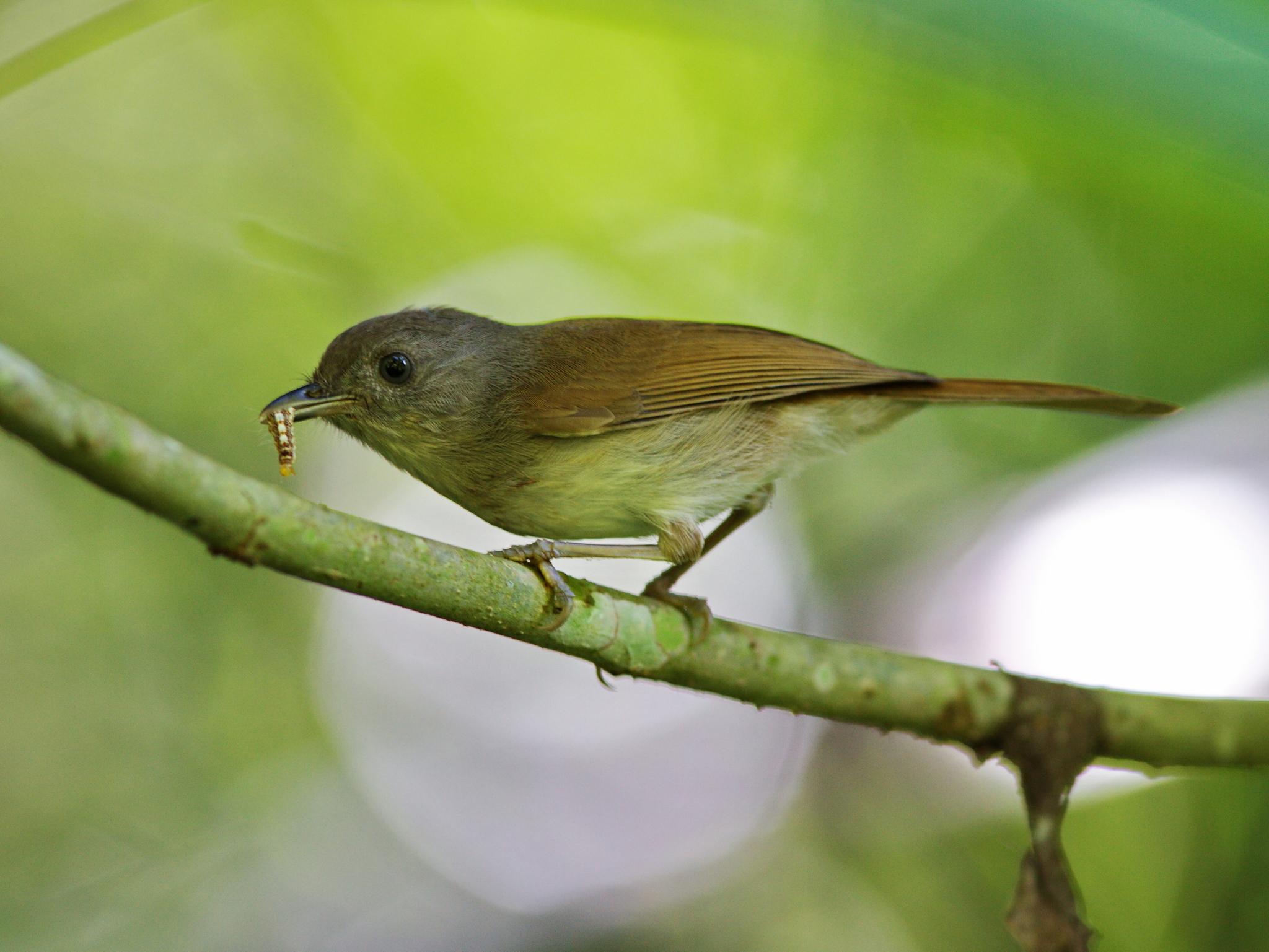

Conservation status
- Near Threatened (IUCN 3.1)

Scientific classification
- Kingdom: Animalia
- Phylum: Chordata
- Class: Aves
- Order: Passeriformes
- Family: Leiothrichidae
- Genus: Alcippe
- Species: A. brunneicauda

Binomial name
- Alcippe brunneicauda (Salvadori, 1879)

= Brown fulvetta =

Species of bird

The brown fulvetta (Alcippe brunneicauda) is a species of bird in the family Leiothrichidae. It is found in Brunei, Indonesia, Malaysia, and Thailand. Its natural habitat is subtropical or tropical moist lowland forest. It is threatened by habitat loss.

There are two subspecies:

- Alcippe brunneicauda. brunneicauda (Salvadori, 1879) – Malay Peninsula, Sumatra, Batu Islands
- Alcippe brunneicauda eriphaea (Oberholser, 1922) – Borneo and northern Natuna Islands
