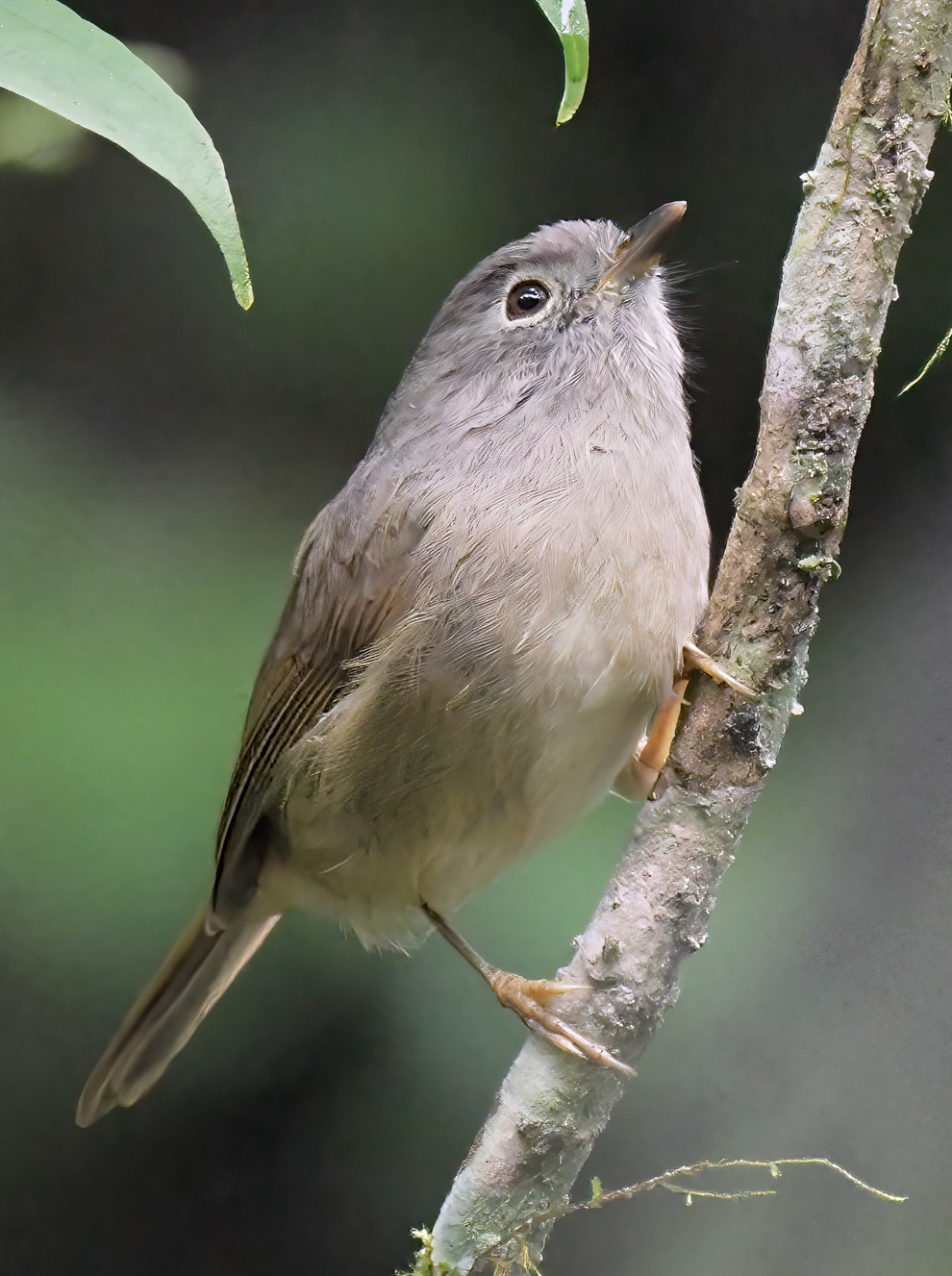

Scientific classification
- Kingdom: Animalia
- Phylum: Chordata
- Class: Aves
- Order: Passeriformes
- Family: Leiothrichidae
- Genus: Alcippe
- Species: A. davidi

Binomial name
- Alcippe davidi Styan, 1896

= David's fulvetta =

Species of bird

David's fulvetta (Alcippe davidi) is a species in the family Leiothrichidae. It is distributed across Myanmar, Laos, mainland China, Vietnam, and Thailand. The conservation status of this species is assessed as Least Concern.

David's fulvetta weighs approximately 15.3 grams, with a wing length of about 60.9 millimeters, a beak length of around 12.3 millimeters, a bill width of approximately 3 millimeters, a bill thickness of about 3.8 millimeters, tarsometatarsus length of around 19.2 millimeters, and a tail length of about 52.4 millimeters. David's fulvetta is a partially migratory bird that inhabits subtropical or tropical moist lowland forests, subtropical or tropical high-altitude shrublands, and subtropical or tropical moist montane forests. Its diet is omnivorous, with terrestrial invertebrates being its primary food source.

== Subspecies ==
Two subspecies are recognised:

- A. d. schaefferi La Touche, JDD, 1923 – southern China (southeastern Yunnan and Guangxi) to northwestern Vietnam
- A. d. davidi Styan, FW, 1896 – south-central China (western Hubei to Hunan, Sichuan, and northeastern Yunnan)
