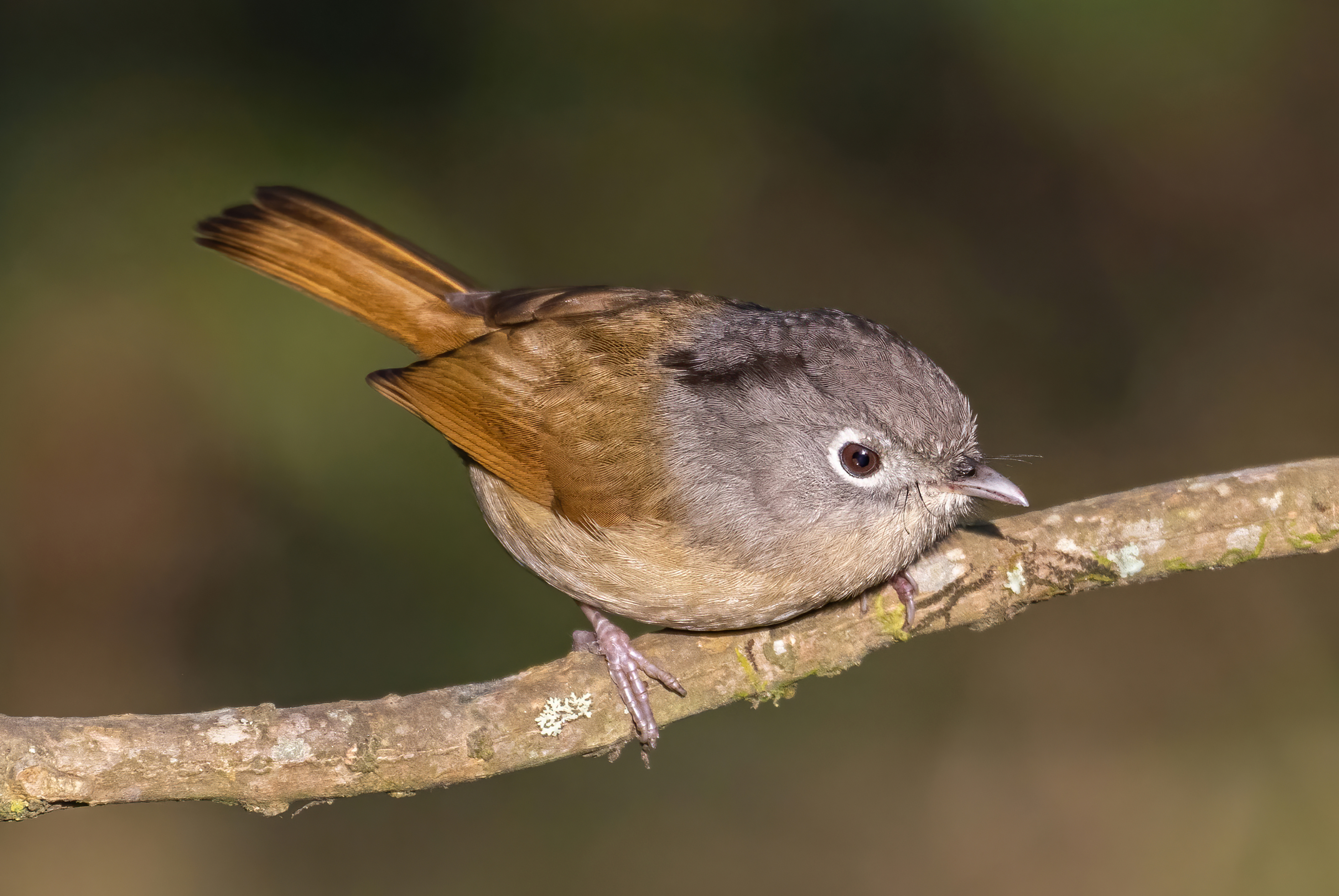
- In Nagarkot, Nepal

Conservation status
- Least Concern (IUCN 3.1)

Scientific classification
- Kingdom: Animalia
- Phylum: Chordata
- Class: Aves
- Order: Passeriformes
- Family: Leiothrichidae
- Genus: Alcippe
- Species: A. nipalensis

Binomial name
- Alcippe nipalensis (Hodgson, 1837)

= Nepal fulvetta =

Species of bird

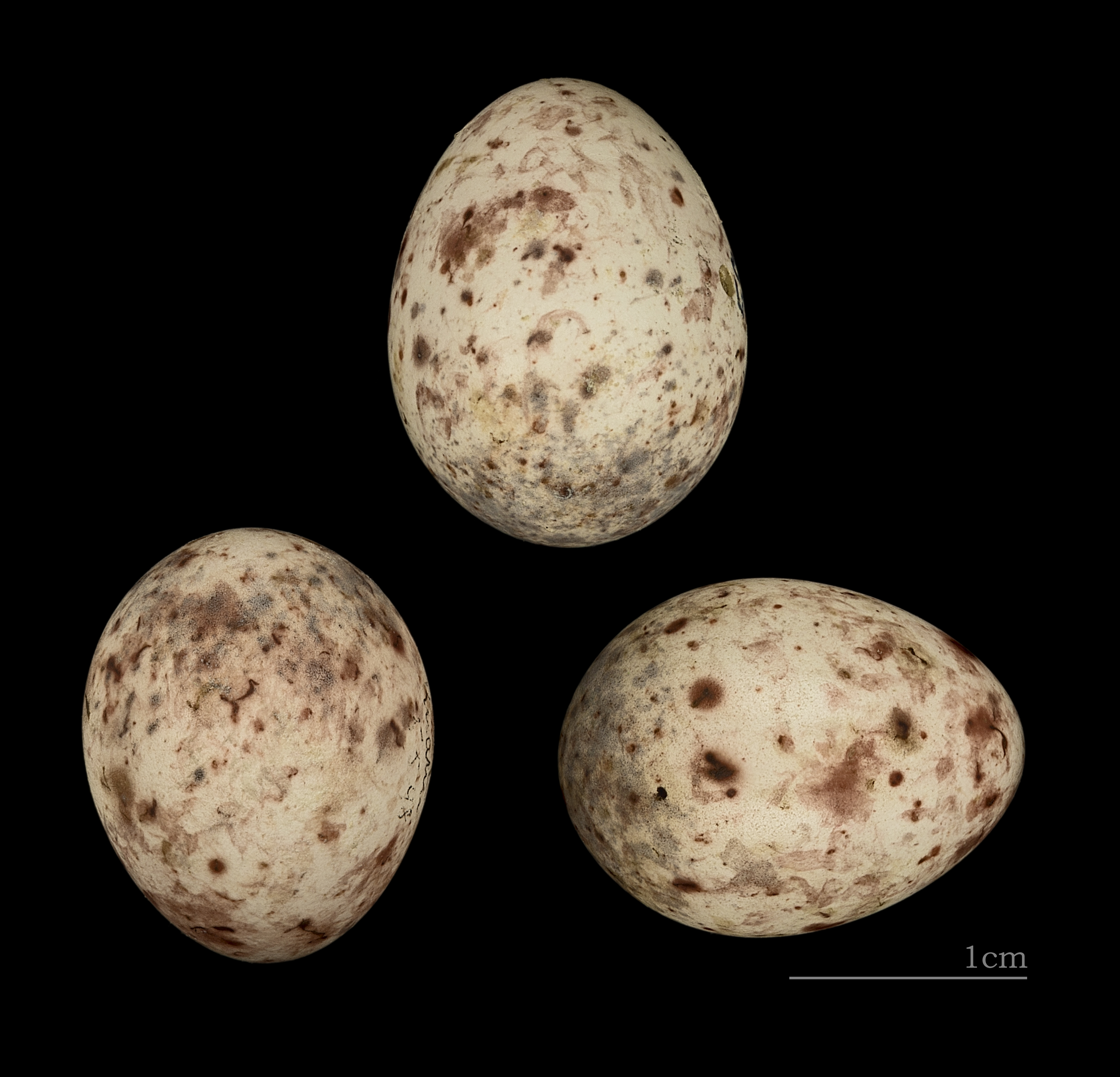
Egg of Alcippe nipalensis MHNT

The Nepal fulvetta (Alcippe nipalensis) or Nepal alcippe, as the fulvettas proper are not closely related to this species, is a bird species in the family Leiothrichidae.

Its natural habitats are subtropical or tropical moist lowland forest and subtropical or tropical moist montane forest.

Two subspecies are recognised:

- A. n. nipalensis (Hodgson, BH, 1837) – central and eastern Himalayas to northern Myanmar
- A. n. stanfordi Ticehurst, CB, 1930 – hill forest of southwestern Myanmar (Chin Hills and Arakan Mountains)
