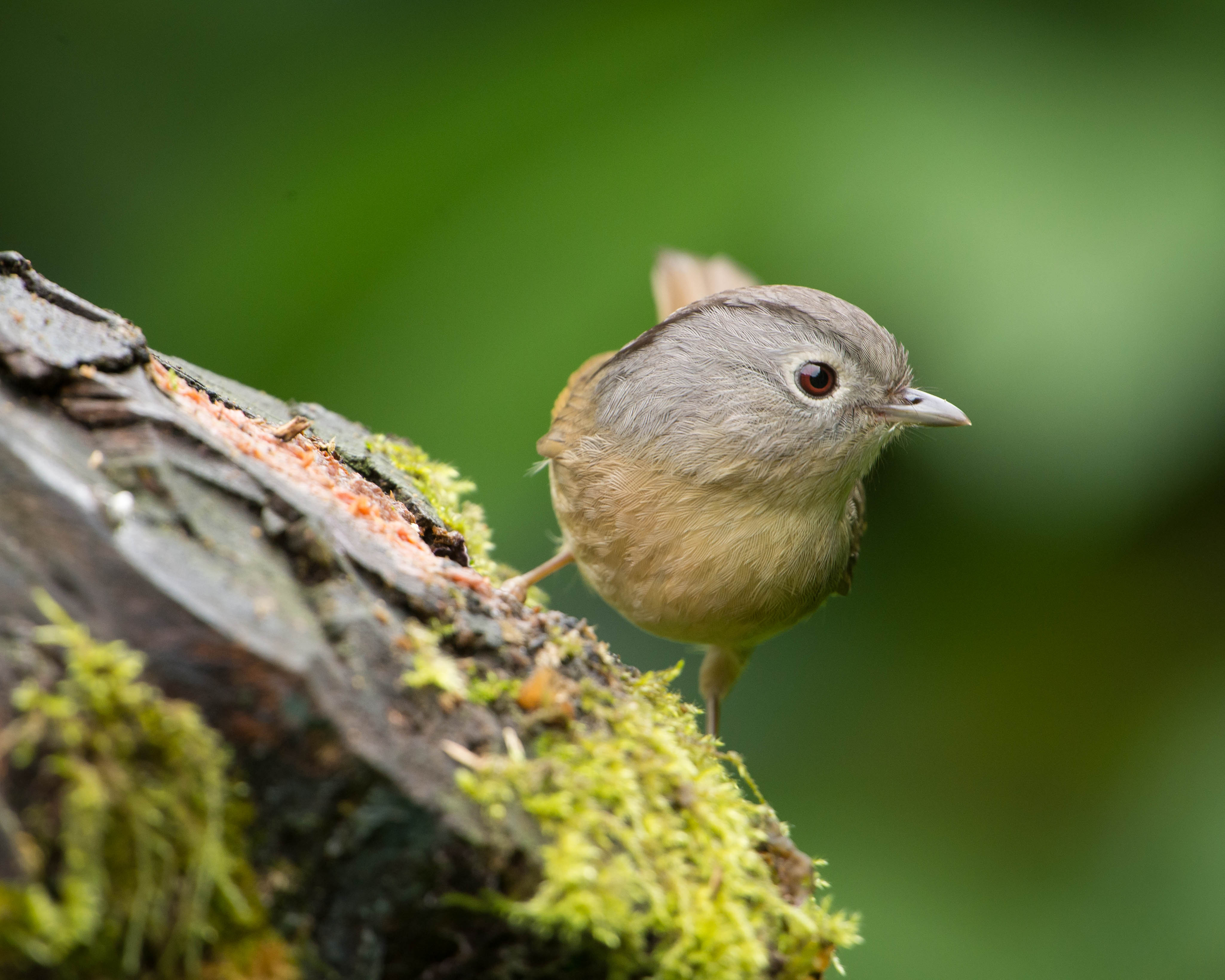
- In Chiang Mai, Thailand

Scientific classification
- Kingdom: Animalia
- Phylum: Chordata
- Class: Aves
- Order: Passeriformes
- Family: Leiothrichidae
- Genus: Alcippe
- Species: A. fratercula

Binomial name
- Alcippe fratercula Rippon, G, 1900

= Yunnan fulvetta =

Species of bird

The Yunnan fulvetta (Alcippe fratercula) is a species of bird in the family Leiothrichidae. It is endemic to southern China, southeastern Myanmar, and northern Indochina.

Its natural habitat is subtropical or tropical moist montane forest.

Three subspecies are recognised:

- A. f. yunnanensis Harington, HH, 1913 – southern China (southern Sichuan and eastern Yunnan) to northeastern Myanmar (Kachin)
- A. f. fratercula Rippon, G, 1900 – central Myanmar to southern China, northern Thailand, and northwestern Laos
- A. f. laotiana Delacour, JT, 1926 – north-central and central Laos and north-central Vietnam
