= Herbert Hastings Harington =

British army officer and naturalist (1868–1916)

Herbert Hastings Harington (16 January 1868 – 8 March 1916) was a British Indian Army officer and ornithologist who worked in Burma and wrote on the birds of the region.

Harington was born in Lucknow to Herbert Harington of the Oudh Commission. He studied at Malvern, and joined the Militia of the Loyal North Lancashire Regiment as a second lieutenant in March 1887. He was promoted to lieutenant in July 1888 before transferring to the Welsh Regiment. In 1890 he joined the Indian Staff Corps and the 62nd Punjabis.

Harington married Dorothy, daughter of Walter Pepys, in 1909. The couple had a son and two daughters, including Sir Charles Harington (1910–2007). He died in action in Mesopotamia on 8 March 1916.

Harington documented many new subspecies of birds, some of which were named after him; these include Anas poecilorhycnha haringtoni (originally described as Polionetta haringtoni by Eugene Oates.) and Garrulus glandarius haringtoni.
