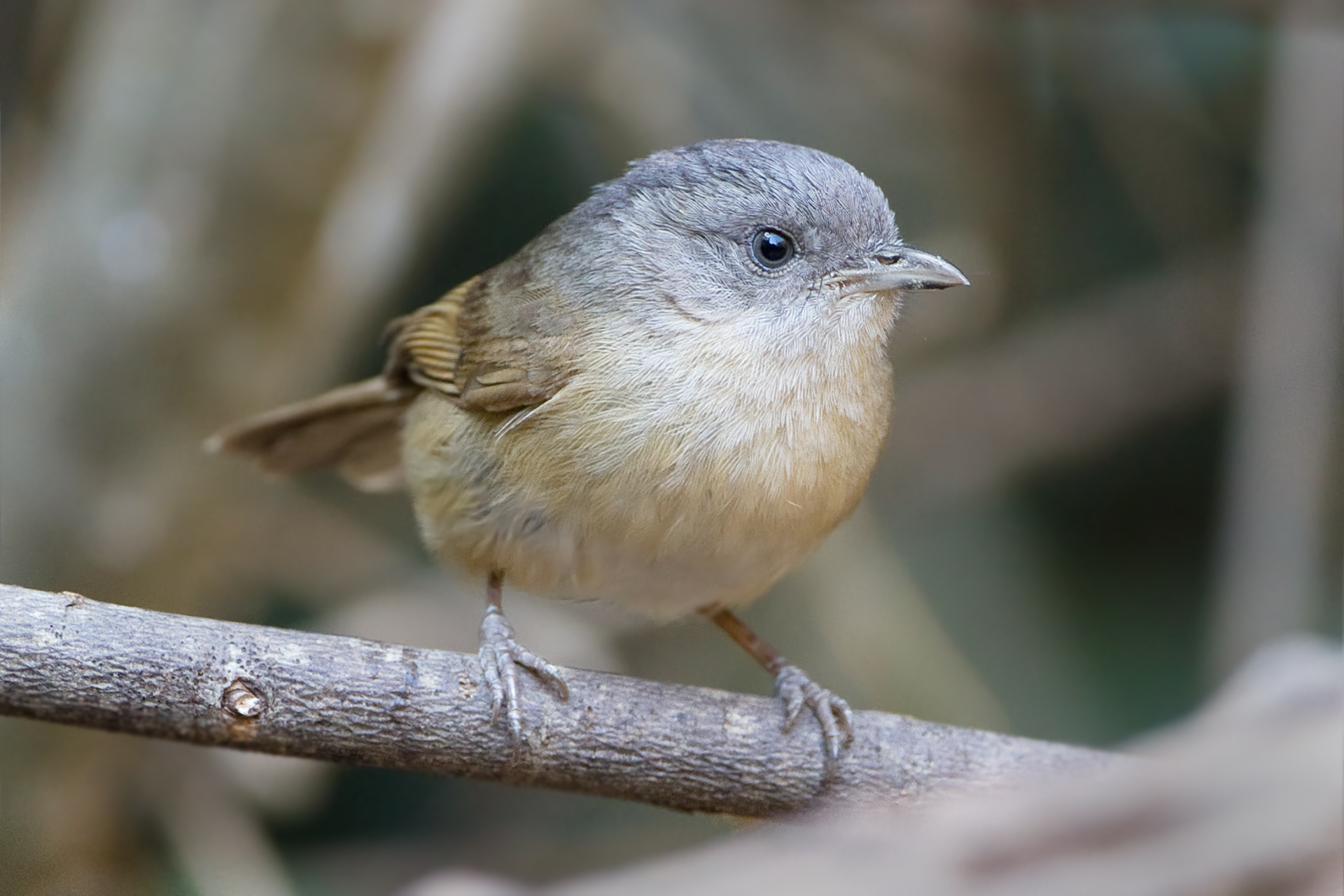
- A. p. davisoni from Thailand

Conservation status
- Least Concern (IUCN 3.1)

Scientific classification
- Kingdom: Animalia
- Phylum: Chordata
- Class: Aves
- Order: Passeriformes
- Family: Leiothrichidae
- Genus: Alcippe
- Species: A. poioicephala

Binomial name
- Alcippe poioicephala (Jerdon, 1841)

Synonyms
- A. phaeocephala; A. poiocephala

= Brown-cheeked fulvetta =

Species of bird

The brown-cheeked fulvetta (Alcippe poioicephala) is a babbler-like bird belonging to the family Leiothrichidae found in the forests of South and Southeast Asia. It was formerly called the quaker babbler in India and common nun babbler in Malaya. They forage on trees for insects, sometimes hanging from the branches in a tit-like manner, and visiting flowers for nectar. They are often hard to see in vegetation but they have loud multi-note whistling calls in the morning and afternoon.

== Description ==
Calls of A. p. poioicephala from the Western Ghats

The brown-cheeked fulvetta is a small dull coloured bird measuring 15 cm from beak to tail tip. The grey bill is short and weak and the upper mandible is curved. The genus Alcippe has the bill widest at the nostrils which are long and has a membrane overhanging it. The tail feathers are all nearly of the same length. The wings are brownish, the underside is buff and the crown is grey. The crown is not demarcated from the rest of the head in the nominate subspecies but in some, there is a dark stripe that begins behind the eyes and meets at the nape. The sexes are indistinguishable and several birds may forage in a loose flock, sometimes joining mixed-species foraging flocks. While foraging, they are often tit-like, dangling below branches while searching for insect prey. Their calls especially during dawn are loud and can be mistaken for that of a magpie robin or puff-throated babbler.

== Distribution and habitat ==
The brown-cheeked fulvetta is a resident breeding bird of moist deciduous and evergreen forests particularly in the hills. They are distributed widely in peninsular India, with other populations to the east of the Brahmaputra river and extending into Southeast Asia.

== Taxonomy ==
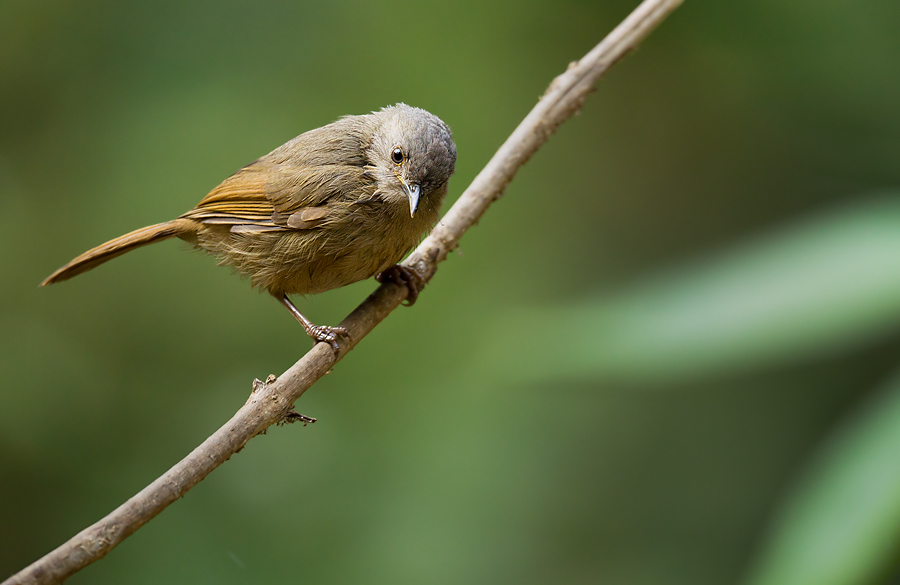
A. p. poioicephala from the Western Ghats

The species was described by Jerdon in the Madras Journal of Literature and Science in 1844 (but technically published in 1841) who placed the species within the broad genus Timalia and called it the small grey-headed babbler. His type specimen came from the Coonoor ghats. The bird was placed with the babblers in the subfamily Timaliinae for a significant period. The species was placed in the genus Alcippe by Blyth who created the genus in 1844. Oberholser created the genus Alcippornis as a substitute name in 1905 but this was based on a misunderstanding of the type species. The name Quaker (and sometimes nun babbler) babbler was used for the species when it was considered as a babbler. The family Timaliidae was considered a dustbin taxon for a long time. A series of molecular phylogeny studies of the babblers resulted in the splitting of the group into several clades including several family level splits. When the group was separated from the traditional babblers it was called a fulvetta along with several other species. Further refining resulted in the separation from the majority of fulvettas but the common name has been retained.

Within its range, several subspecies have been named which vary in plumage (another Alcippe species has also been found to have substantial geographical variation through isolation and evolutionary history), the brown cheek is seen more prominently in some of the Southeast Asian populations:

- A. p. poioicephala (Jerdon, 1844[1841]) - Western Ghats and southern peninsular India (includes A. p. brucei described from Mahabaleshwar which is used for the birds of the Eastern Ghats and central India. A. p. bourdilloni from Travancore described by Hume not recognized)
- A. p. haringtoniae Hartert, 1909 - E Myanmar - has darkish subcoronal stripes on the head
- A. p. phayrei Blyth, 1845 - S W Myanmar
- A. p. fusca Godwin-Austen, 1876 - E Bangladesh
- A. p. alearis (Bangs and Van Tyne, 1930) - S China (S Yunnan), N and C Laos, N Vietnam (W Tonkin) and N Thailand
- A. p. karenni Robinson and Kloss, 1928 - SE and S Myanmar (S to N Tenasserim) and adjacent W Thailand - (replaces the names magnirostris Walden, 1875 and blythi Collin and Hartert, 1927)
- A. p. davisoni Harington, 1915 - extreme S Myanmar (S Tenasserim) and N peninsular Thailand

== Ecology and behaviour ==
The fulvetta has been suspected to have two broods in a year and nests have been observed from January to June with a peak in January–February. A study in southern India found 38 nests within 50,000 square metres. The nest is a cup, built with green moss, rootlets, lichen, leaves, and grass lined with rootlets and placed in a fork or suspended from the twigs at a mean height of 68.21 cm from ground. Mean nest width was 91.8 mm and depth 48.7 mm. Clutch size was two to three eggs and the incubation period is 10 ± 2 days and the nestling period is 12 ± 2 days. Hatching success was 55% while the nestling success was 32%. The most preferred plants for nesting were shrubs of the species Lasianthus ciliatus (36%) followed by the Saprosma fragrans (27%) and Thottea siliquosa (23%).

With their loud calls, it has been suggested that fulvettas have a role in the organization of mixed species foraging flocks and have been noted as being dominant members of flocks in Malayan forests.

The species visits flowers for nectar and has been recorded visiting the flowers of Erythrina and Cullenia exarillata. The ectoparasitic fly Ornithoctona australasiae (Fabricius, 1805) has been collected on brown-cheeked fulvettas from Malaya. A species of parasitic cestode, Dicranotaenia alcippina, has been described from the species.

== Bibliography ==
- Collar, N. J. & Robson C. 2007. Family Timaliidae (Babblers) pp. 70 – 291 in; del Hoyo, J., Elliott, A. & Christie, D.A. eds. Handbook of the Birds of the World, Vol. 12. Picathartes to Tits and Chickadees. Lynx Edicions, Barcelona.
- Grimmett, Richard; Inskipp, Carol, Inskipp, Tim & Byers, Clive (1999): Birds of India, Pakistan, Nepal, Bangladesh, Bhutan, Sri Lanka, and the Maldives. Princeton University Press, Princeton, N.J.. ISBN 0-691-04910-6
