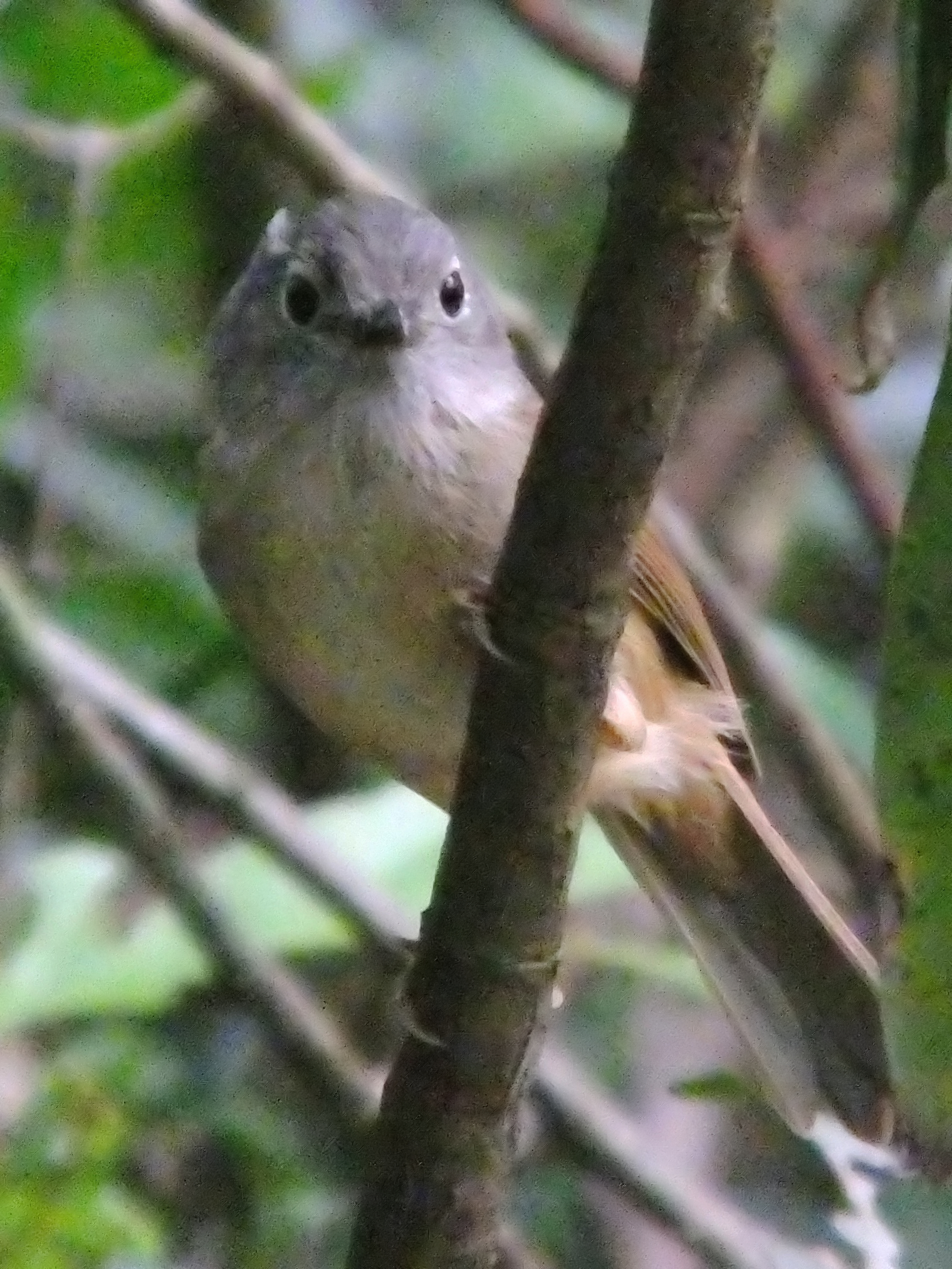

Scientific classification
- Kingdom: Animalia
- Phylum: Chordata
- Class: Aves
- Order: Passeriformes
- Family: Leiothrichidae
- Genus: Alcippe
- Species: A. hueti

Binomial name
- Alcippe hueti David, 1874

= Huet's fulvetta =

Species of bird

Huet's fulvetta (Alcippe hueti) is a species of bird in the family Leiothrichidae. It is endemic to southeast China. Its natural habitat is subtropical or tropical moist montane forest. Its diet includes Vaccinium carlesii.

Two subspecies are recognised:

- A. h. hueti David, A, 1874 – hill forest of southeastern China (Guangdong to Anhui)
- A. h. rufescentior (Hartert, EJO, 1910) – Hainan (southern China)
