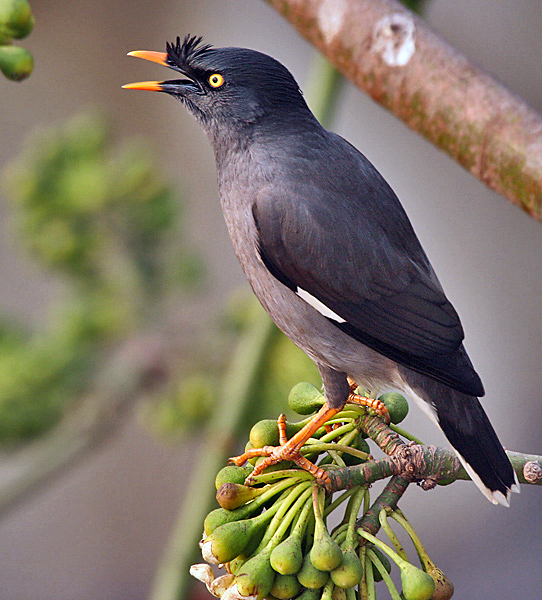
- A. f. fuscus

Conservation status
- Least Concern (IUCN 3.1)

Scientific classification
- Kingdom: Animalia
- Phylum: Chordata
- Class: Aves
- Order: Passeriformes
- Family: Sturnidae
- Genus: Acridotheres
- Species: A. fuscus

Binomial name
- Acridotheres fuscus (Wagler, 1827)

Subspecies
- A. f. fuscus (Wagler, 1827); A. f. fumidus Ripley, 1950; A. f. mahrattensis (Sykes, 1832); A. f. torquatus Davison, 1892

Synonyms
- Aethiopsar fuscus; Maina cristelloides Hodgson, 1836; Acridotheres cristatelloides Cabanis, 1850

= Jungle myna =

Species of bird

The jungle myna (Acridotheres fuscus) is a myna, a member of the starling family. It is found patchily distributed across much of the mainland of the Indian Subcontinent but absent in the arid zones of India. It is easily recognized by the tuft of feathers on its forehead that form a frontal crest, a feature also found in the closely related Javan myna and the pale-bellied myna which were treated as a subspecies in the past. The eyes are pale, yellow or blue depending on the population and the base of the orange-yellow bill is dark. It has also been introduced either intentionally or accidentally into many other parts of the world including Fiji, Taiwan, the Andaman Islands, and parts of Japan. The species has also spread out on its own to some islands in the Pacific.

== Description ==
- - - - - A. cinereus
        - - A. fuscus
          - A. javanicus
      - - A. albocinctus
        - - A. cristatellus
          - A. grandis
    - - A. melanopterus
      - A. burmannicus
  - - A. ginginianus
    - A. tristis

Relationship to other Acridotheres species which form a clade among the starlings

Jungle mynas are 23-centimetre (9.1 in) long and have grey plumage, darker on the head and wings. The sexes are indistinguishable in plumage. A large white wing patches on the base of the primaries becomes conspicuous in flight, and the tail feathers are broadly tipped in white. There is a tuft of feathers on the forehead arising at the base of the bill. The bill and legs are bright yellow, and there is no bare skin around eye as in the common myna and the bank myna. The base of the beak is dark in adults with a shade of blue at the base of the lower mandible. The southern Indian population has a blue iris. The northeastern Indian populations have a smoky dark belly and vent. Juveniles are browner with a pale throat and along the median of the underside.

Abnormal leucistic plumages have been recorded.

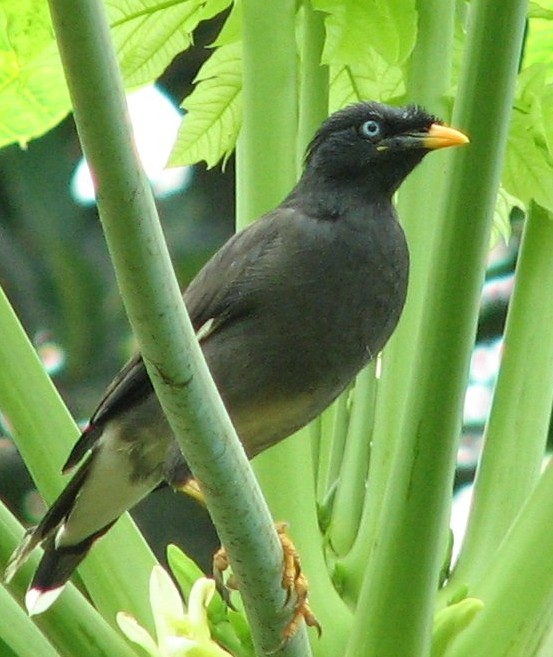
A. f. mahrattensis with blue iris

The calls of the jungle myna are higher pitched than those of the common myna. Foraging flocks make clipped cheeping contact calls.

The jungle myna is part of the Acridotheres clade which is thought to have speciated in the late Pliocene and Pleistocene Periods. Unlike the starlings in the genus Sturnus, they do not have well-developed adaptations including the musculature required for prying or open bill probing (which need muscles to open the beak apart forcefully). The nominate population A. f. fuscus was described from Bengal by Wagler as Pastor fuscus in 1827. It has a pale creamy vent. This population with a yellow iris extends south of the Brahmaputra into Burma and the Malay Peninsula. A. f. fumidus of eastern India, mainly east of the Brahmaputra in Assam and Nagaland (although movements are known), was described by Sidney Dillon Ripley in 1950, although he placed it as a subspecies of cristatellus based on the prevailing treatment of the time. It has a darker smoky grey vent and can appear similar to the syntopic great myna, but the latter is darker and does not have a pale iris.. The peninsular Indian population mahrattensis described by W.H. Sykes in 1832 is identifiable by the blue iris. The population in the Malay Peninsula, torquatus, was described by W.R. Davison in 1892. It has a white throat and a half-collar extending around the neck. The species has a diploid chromosome number of 74 (80 in the common myna).

== Distribution and habitat ==
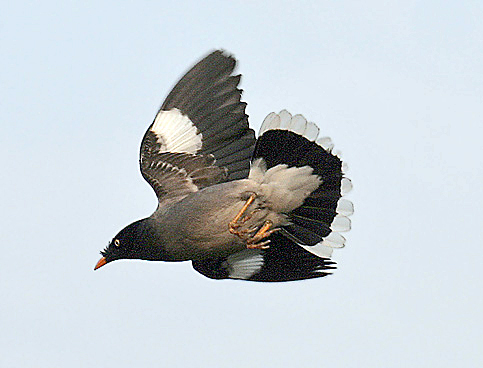
The white of the base of the primaries and the tips of the tail are visible in flight

The jungle myna is a common resident breeder in tropical southern Asia from Nepal, Bangladesh, India. Subspecies fuscus is found across northern India west from Mount Abu, east to Puri in Orissa. It has also been introduced into the Andaman Islands and Fiji where it was introduced around 1890 to control insect pests in sugarcane. They have expanded on their own into some Pacific Islands such as Niuafo'ou where they are a threat to native bird species such as lories (Vini) with whom they compete especially for nest holes. In many parts of Asia, they are kept as pets and feral populations have established in many places such as in Taiwan. Breeding populations have established in Japan and Western Samoa. The population torquatus of Malaysia is on the decline and is possibly being outcompeted by Javan mynas with which it form hybrids.

This common passerine is typically found in forest and cultivation and often close to open water. They may disperse outside their range particularly after the breeding season.

== Behaviour and ecology ==
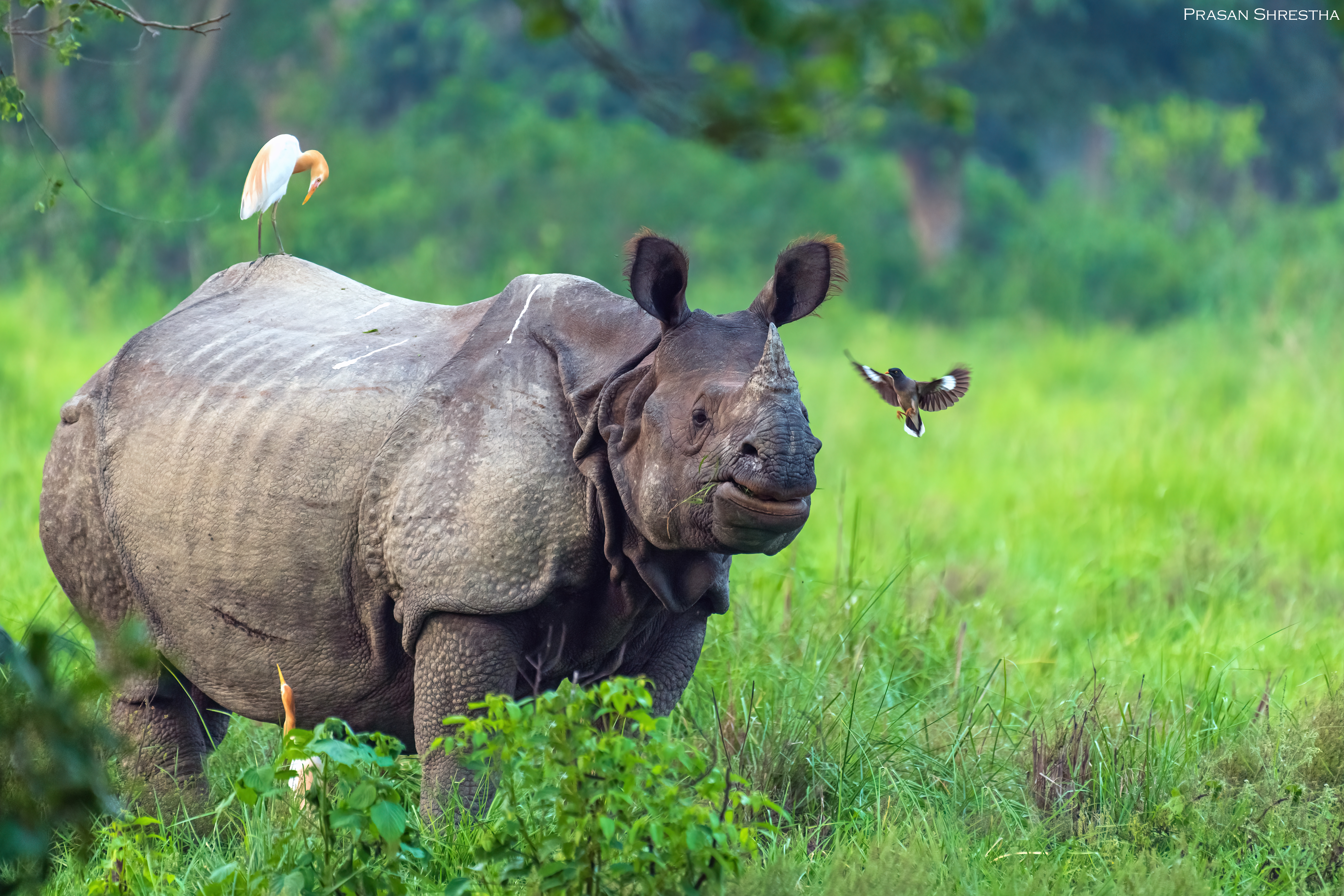
A perched cattle egret and fluttering jungle myna pick off parasites and insects from the external skin of this Indian rhinoceros in Chitwan National Park, Nepal.

Jungle mynas are omnivorous feed mainly on insects, fruit and seeds, for which they forage mainly on the ground often in the company of other myna species. They also take berries from low bushes such as Lantana and take nectar from large flowers borne on trees such as Erythrina (which they may also pollinate with their tuft feathers acting as brushes) and water collected in the flowers of introduced trees such Spathodea campanulata. They also perch on large grazing mammals, picking ectoparasites off their bodies, and capturing insects that may be disturbed into flight from vegetation. Flocks may also follow farmers in fields that are being ploughed. They also forage on kitchen waste in urban areas. They may take larger prey including small mice to feed their young. In Fiji, they have been noticed anting using a millipede.

The breeding season is in summer and before the rains, February to May in southern India and April to July in northern India. They are secondary cavity nesters, using both holes in trees and in man-made constructions such as walls, embankments, and in houses from 2 to 6 metres above the ground. As secondary tree hole nesters, they compete with other hole-nesters. They have also been recorded using the axils of fronds of palm trees in Malaysia. They sometimes use sloughed snake skins to line the inside of the nest hole. In the Himalayan foothills, they use dry pine needles to line the nest. The usual clutch consists of 4 to 6 turquoise blue eggs. Both sexes take part in nest building, incubation and feeding the young.

They roost communally along with other mynas, sometimes in sugarcane fields and reed beds.

Species of Haemoproteus are known from the blood of mynas and they have also been found to host Plasmodium circumflexum when artificially infected in the lab. Other parasites that have been found in the jungle myna include Dorisa aethiopsaris in the intestine.
