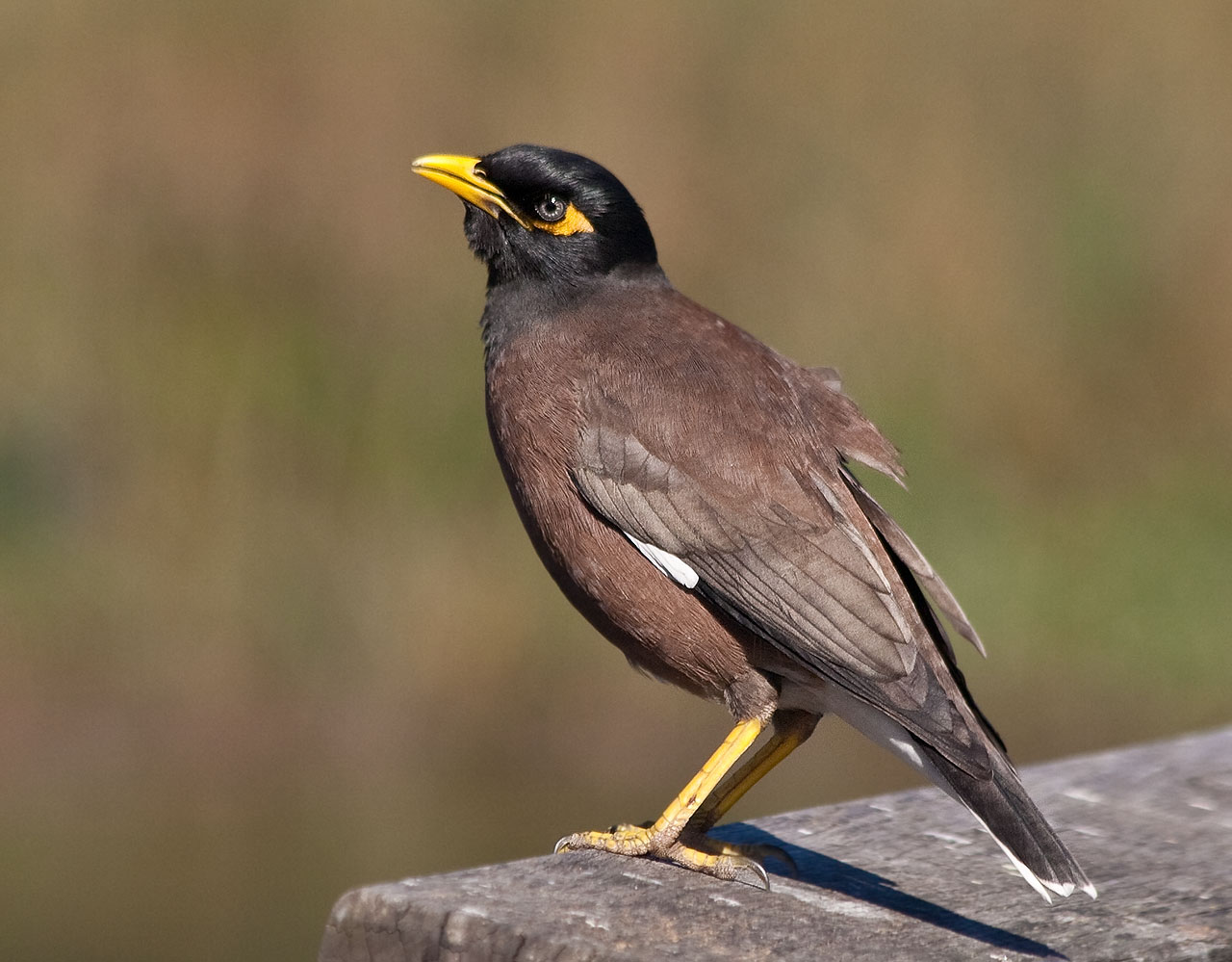
- Common myna (Acridotheres tristis)

Scientific classification
- Kingdom: Animalia
- Phylum: Chordata
- Class: Aves
- Order: Passeriformes
- Superfamily: Muscicapoidea
- Family: Sturnidae

= Myna =

Common name for several species of birds

The mynas (/ˈmaɪnə/; also spelled mynah) are a group of birds in the starling family (Sturnidae). They are passerine birds native to large parts of Central Asia and South Asia, especially Iran, Afghanistan, India, Pakistan, Bangladesh, Nepal and Sri Lanka. Several species have been introduced to areas such as North America, Australia, South Africa, Fiji and New Zealand, especially the common myna, which is often regarded as an invasive species. In Singapore, they are sometimes known as "Selarang" in Malay and "Teck Meng" in Chinese due to their high population there.

Mynas are not a natural group; instead, the term myna is used for any starling in the Indian subcontinent, regardless of their relationships. This range was colonized twice during the evolution of starlings, first by rather ancestral starlings related to the coleto and Aplonis lineages, and millions of years later by birds related to the common starling and wattled starling's ancestors. These two groups of mynas can be distinguished in the more terrestrial adaptions of the latter, which usually also have less glossy plumage, except on the heads, and longer tails. The Bali myna, which is critically endangered and nearly extinct in the wild, is highly distinctive.

Some mynas are considered talking birds, for their ability to reproduce sounds, including human speech, when in captivity.

Myna is derived from the Hindi (मैना) mainā which itself is derived from Sanskrit madanā.

== Characteristics ==
Mynas are medium-sized passerines with strong feet. Their flight is strong and direct, and they are gregarious. Their preferred habitat is fairly open country, and they eat insects and fruit.

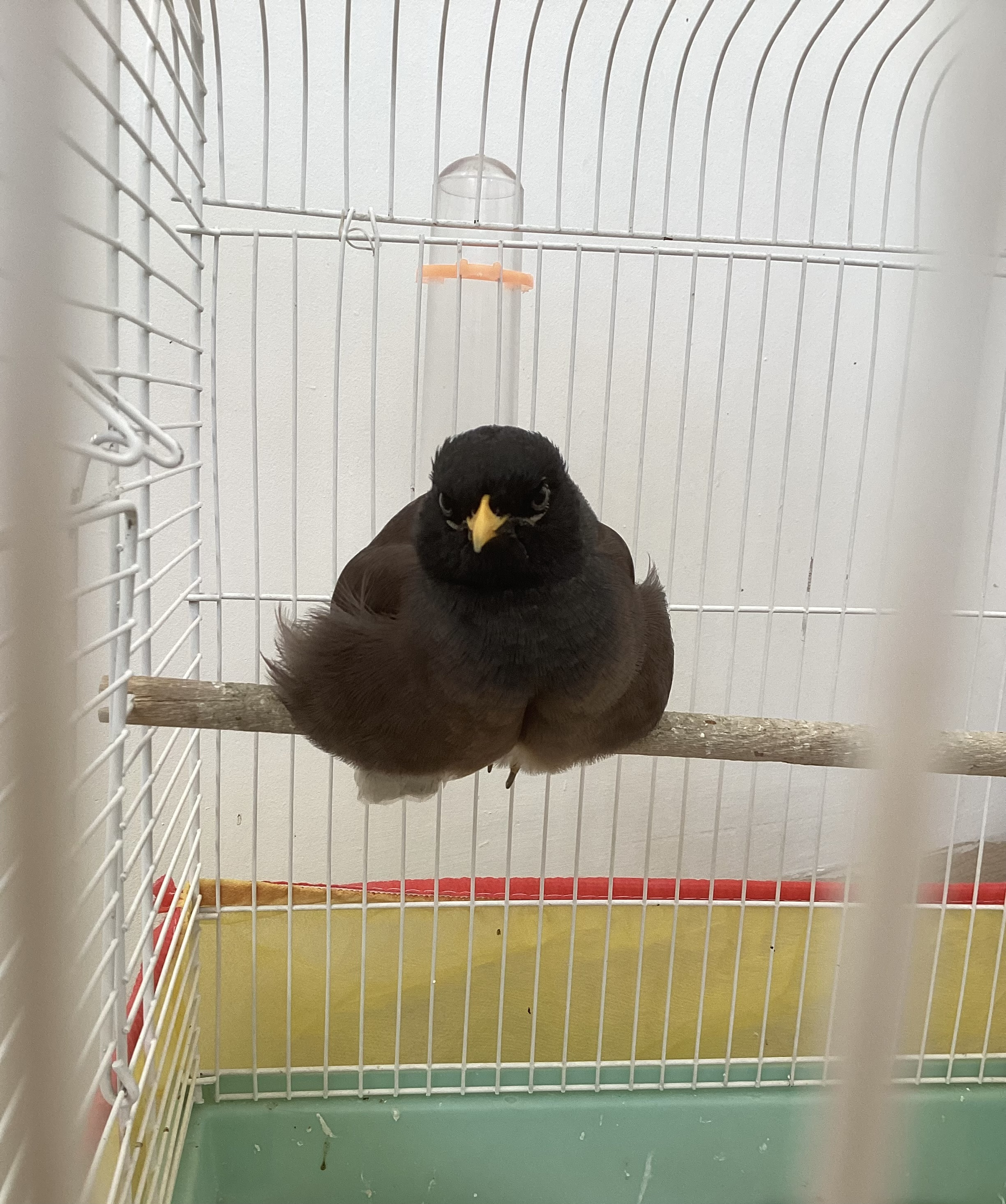
A Common Myna in cage

Plumage is typically dark, often brown, although some species have yellow head ornaments. Most species nest in holes.

Some species have become well known for their imitative skills; the common hill myna is one of these.

== Species ==
The following are species of mynas. The coleto and the two Saroglossa starlings are included because of their position in the taxonomic list.

=== Jungle and hill mynas ===
- Yellow-faced myna, Mino dumontii
- Golden myna, Mino anais
- Long-tailed myna, Mino kreffti
- Sulawesi myna, Basilornis celebensis
- Helmeted myna, Basilornis galeatus
- Long-crested myna, Basilornis corythaix
- Apo myna, Goodfellowia miranda
- White-necked myna, Streptocitta albicollis
- Bare-eyed myna, Streptocitta albertinae
- Fiery-browed myna, Enodes erythrophris
- Finch-billed myna, Scissirostrum dubium
- Golden-crested myna, Ampeliceps coronatus
- Common hill myna, Gracula religiosa
- Southern hill myna, Gracula indica
- Enggano hill myna, Gracula enganensis
- Nias hill myna, Gracula robusta
- Sri Lanka hill myna, Gracula ptilogenys

=== "True" mynas ===
- Great myna, Acridotheres grandis
- Crested myna, Acridotheres cristatellus
- Javan myna, Acridotheres javanicus
- Pale-bellied myna, Acridotheres cinereus
- Jungle myna, Acridotheres fuscus
- Collared myna, Acridotheres albocinctus
- Bank myna, Acridotheres ginginianus
- Common myna, Acridotheres tristis
- Bali myna, Leucopsar rothschildi

=== "Gracupica" mynas ===
- Indian pied myna, Gracupica contra
- Siamese pied myna, Gracupica floweri
- Javan pied myna, Gracupica jalla

The following species are often included in the Acridotheres mynas:

- Vinous-breasted starling, Acridotheres burmannicus
- Black-winged starling, Acridotheres melanopterus
- Red-billed starling, Spodiopsar sericeus
- White-cheeked starling, Spodiopsar cineraceus

== Sources ==
- Zuccon, Dario; Cibois, Alice; Pasquet, Eric; Ericson, Per G. P. (2006). "Nuclear and mitochondrial sequence data reveal the major lineages of starlings, mynas and related taxa". Molecular Phylogenetics and Evolution. 41 (2): 333–344. Bibcode:2006MolPE..41..333Z. doi:10.1016/j.ympev.2006.05.007. PMID 16806992.
