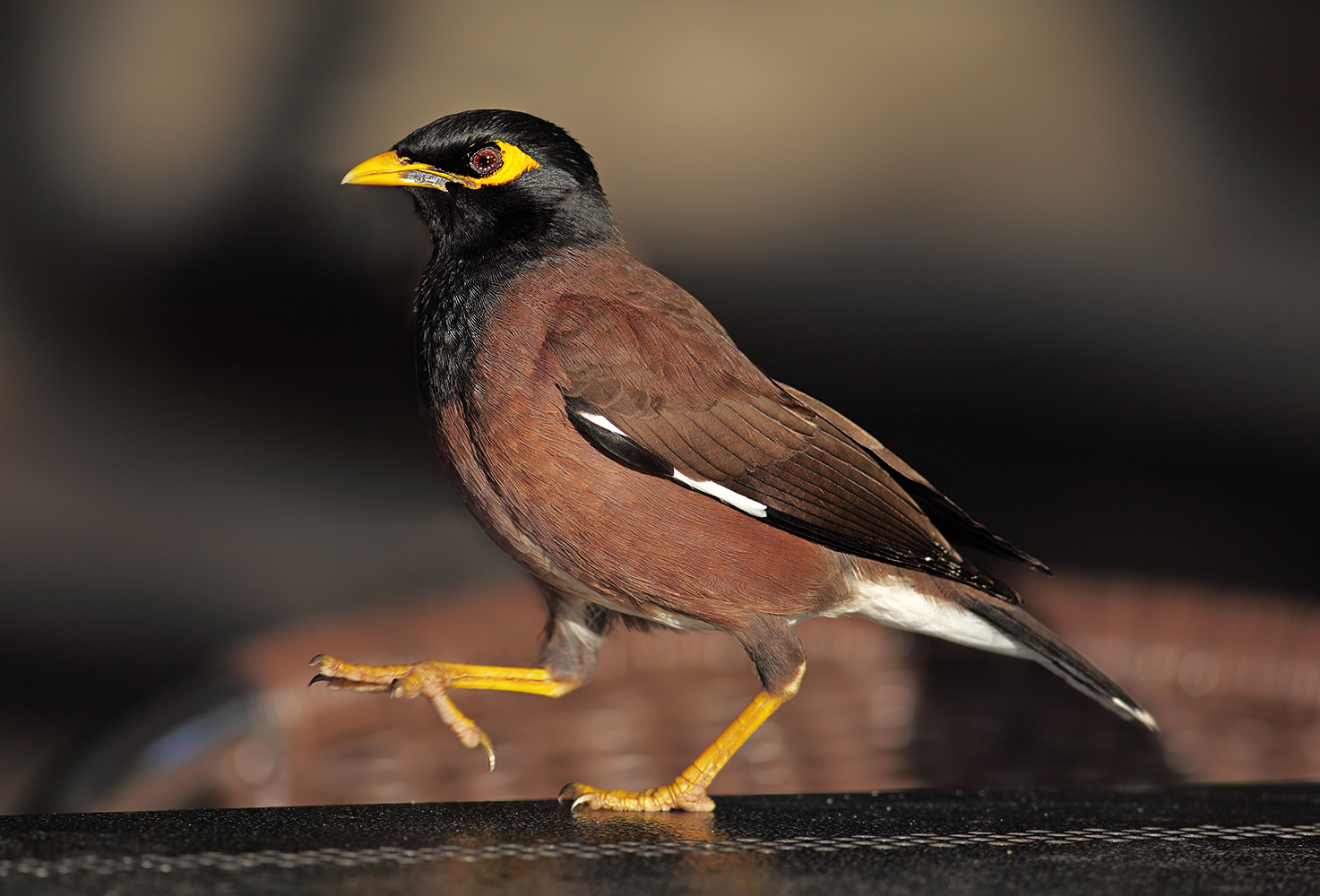
- Common myna, Acridotheres tristis

Scientific classification
- Kingdom: Animalia
- Phylum: Chordata
- Class: Aves
- Order: Passeriformes
- Family: Sturnidae
- Genus: Acridotheres; Vieillot, 1816

Type species
- Paradisea tristis Linnaeus, 1766

Species
- 11; see text

= Acridotheres =

Genus of birds

Acridotheres is a genus of starlings, the "typical" mynas, which are tropical members of the family Sturnidae.

== Taxonomy ==
The genus Acridotheres was introduced in 1816 by the French ornithologist Louis Vieillot. The type species was subsequently designated as Paradisea tristis Linnaeus, the common myna. The name Acridotheres combines the Ancient Greek akridos meaning "locust" with -thēras meaning "-hunter".

Despite being called "mynas", species in the genus Acridotheres are more closely related to a group of mainly terrestrial starlings from Eurasia, such as the common starling, and also African ones like the Lamprotornis glossy-starlings. Among these, they are among the larger and duller species; they seem to be one of the major groups to evolve most recently. Apparently, they all arose from ancestors which arrived from Central Asia and adapted to more humid conditions in the Tropics. They presumably were isolated in about their current range when the evolutionary radiation to which they belonged - including the wattled starling and the Sturnia species - was fragmented by desertification at the start of the Early Pliocene, as Earth turned towards the last ice age 5 million years ago.

== Distribution ==
This genus has representatives in tropical southern Asia from Iran east to southern China and Indonesia. Two species have been introduced widely elsewhere. The common myna has been introduced to South Africa, Israel, Hawaii, North America, Australia and New Zealand, and the crested myna to the Vancouver region of British Columbia.

== Description ==
The Acridotheres mynas are generally dark or dull birds with fluted calls like most starlings; the sexes are similar. They walk and hop, and may share adaptations along with the Sturnus starlings that have modifications to the skull and its muscles for open bill probing or prying. They resemble the hill mynas (Gracula) with which they often co-occur, in having large white or buff wing patches which are obvious in flight and in some also naked areas on the head, but differ in that only the head plumage is glossy, and the underparts tend to be paler. The naked head patches are different in arrangement. Acridotheres mynas are also much more terrestrial than Gracula.

Several species have frontal crests which become covered with pollen when the birds take nectar from flowers, and may play a role in pollination.

== Behaviour ==
The Acridotheres mynas have bowing courtship displays and lay unmarked pale blue eggs, whereas Gracula has no visual display.

Like most starlings, the Acridotheres mynas are fairly omnivorous, eating fruit, nectar and insects.

=== Species ===
The cladogram below showing the relationships of the species within the genus is based on a molecular phylogenetic study published in 2008. The Burmese myna (Acridotheres burmannicus) was not included in the study.

- Acridotheres
  - - Bank myna, Acridotheres ginginianus
    - Common myna, Acridotheres tristis
  - - - Black-winged myna, Acridotheres melanopterus
      - Vinous-breasted myna, Acridotheres leucocephalus
    - - - Pale-bellied myna, Acridotheres cinereus
        - - Jungle myna, Acridotheres fuscus
          - Javan myna, Acridotheres javanicus
      - - Collared myna, Acridotheres albocinctus
        - - Crested myna, Acridotheres cristatellus
          - Great myna, Acridotheres grandis

== Species ==
The genus contains the following 11 species:

| Image | Common name | Scientific name | Distribution |
|---|---|---|---|
| | Collared myna | Acridotheres albocinctus | Northeast India to central south China |
| | Burmese myna | Acridotheres burmannicus | Myanmar and southwest China |
| | Pale-bellied myna | Acridotheres cinereus | South Sulawesi |
| | Crested myna | Acridotheres cristatellus | South China to southeast Asia |
| | Jungle myna | Acridotheres fuscus | Widespread from India to the Malay Peninsula |
| | Bank myna | Acridotheres ginginianus | Pakistan, India and Bangladesh |
| | Great myna | Acridotheres grandis | Northeast India through southeast Asia |
| | Javan myna | Acridotheres javanicus | Java and Bali (introduced widely elsewhere) |
| | Vinous-breasted myna | Acridotheres leucocephalus | Thailand to Vietnam |
| | Black-winged myna | Acridotheres melanopterus | Java and Bali |
| | Common myna | Acridotheres tristis | Widely distributed in southern Asia |
