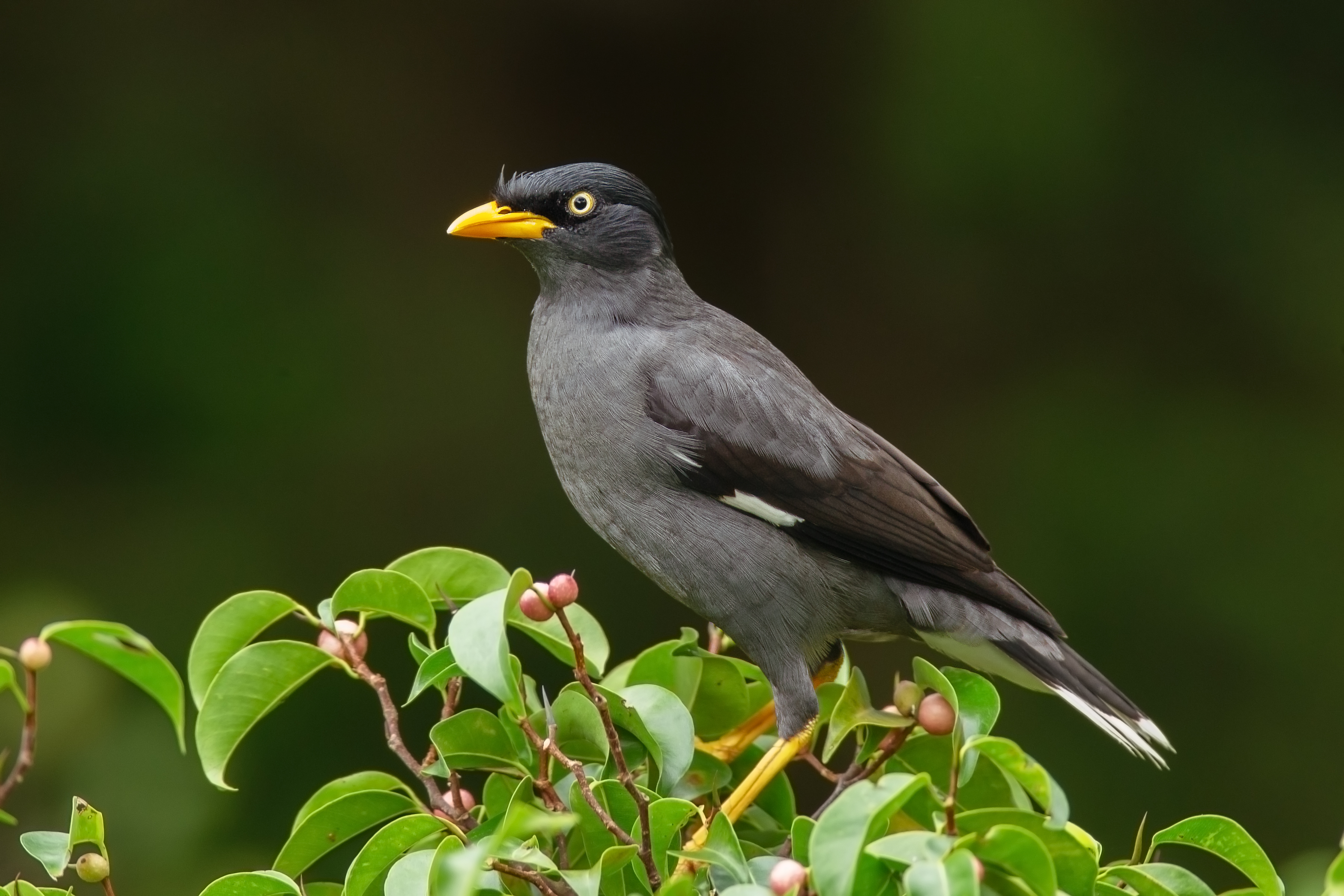

Conservation status
- Vulnerable (IUCN 3.1)

Scientific classification
- Kingdom: Animalia
- Phylum: Chordata
- Class: Aves
- Order: Passeriformes
- Family: Sturnidae
- Genus: Acridotheres
- Species: A. javanicus

Binomial name
- Acridotheres javanicus Cabanis, 1851

= Javan myna =

Species of bird

The Javan myna (Acridotheres javanicus), also known as the white-vented myna, is a species of myna. It is a member of the starling family. It is native to Bali and Java. It has been introduced to other Asian countries, and as far away as Puerto Rico.

== Taxonomy ==
The Javan myna is sometimes included in the great myna (Acridotheres grandis) or the jungle myna (A. fuscus). The International Ornithologists' Union recommends not using the name "white-vented myna" to avoid confusion with the pale-bellied myna A. cinereus.

== Description ==
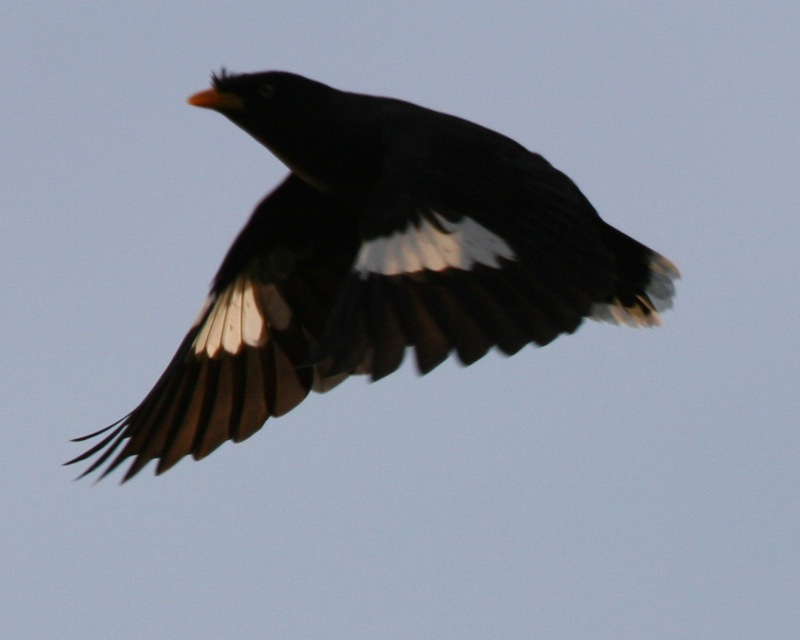
Javan myna in flight, showing the distinctive white wing and tail bars

The Javan myna is mainly black. The wings are brownish-black, and the primary feathers have white bases, displayed in flight as a striking white wing bar, along with a white tail bar. The undertail-coverts are white. There is a short crest on the forehead. Its beak, legs and feet are yellow. The eyes are lemon-yellow. The immature is browner. Its length is 21–23 cm (8.3–9.1 in). Its weight is about 100 g (3.5 oz).

Javan mynas feeding on the streets of Singapore. Video clip

== Habitat ==
The Javan myna is native to Bali and Java, and has been introduced to southeastern Thailand, southern Malaysia, Singapore, Sumatra, the Lesser Sundas, Taiwan, Puerto Rico, Japan and Nepal. It is found in cities and cultivated areas.

Javan mynas are considered endangered in native areas like Java, where excessive cage trapping dwindled its population.

=== Introduction to Singapore ===
Javan mynas were first introduced to Singapore, a massive colonial trade hub by the British Empire, in the 1920s through caged bird trade.

== Behaviour ==
Javan mynas are bold and not very afraid of humans. Even when within two meter's distance, they would stay put instead of flying likely due to being used to people.Javan mynas are kept in cages in Malaysia and Indonesia.

Javan mynas are found in pairs and associate in larger groups. Its voice is similar to that of the common myna. It builds its nest in holes.

Javan mynas scavenge in groups of 2 to 4, or more, with all except one feeding and one usually at a vantage point keeping a look out. If the bird that is keeping watch sees anything that might pose a threat, it alarms the group members with a high pitch tweet and they all flee the area swiftly.

Javan mynas are also known to be adaptive and are therefore able to learn fast. A myna had learnt to fly up to an automatic door's motion sensor which caused it to open. It and its mate flew out of the door.

Javan mynas sleep in one of two ways:

1. The Javan myna supports itself on its tarsi and rump. It placed its head to one side of its shoulder and raises its lower eyelids to close its eyes.
2. The Javan myna rests its entire body on the ground, with the head also touching the ground.

=== Fighting ===
Javan mynas are territorial and are often quarrelsome, engaging in noisy fights. Javan mynas often fight in pairs, usually two sets of pairs. They mostly fight over territorial, mating or food rights. An aggressor would pin its opponent to the ground which allows them to deliver strikes from a position of advantage while the opponent would try to reverse the situation. These fights often last from as short as 1–10 minutes and the objective is typically to display dominance rather than severely injuring or killing the opponent. The outcome ends in the losing side to feel apprehensive and fly away.

=== Diet ===
The Javan myna is omnivorous and eats seeds, fruit, nectar, insects and human waste.

=== Juveniles ===
The juvenile, or fledgling, period of a Javan myna lasts about 25 days. Juveniles make incessant, high-pitched and scratchy, calls (onomatopoeically expressed as "kaeeu kaeeu kaeeu") to plead for food from their parents accompanied by its "half-flaps" and "wing quivering". Juveniles are fed by the adults with food such as small seeds, fruits or insects which are not regurgitated.

=== Eggs ===
The eggs of a Javan myna are blue in colour and takes 13–14 days to hatch. Eggs are laid in clutches of 2–5 at a time. After the chick hatches, the adult will remove the eggshells immediately and dispose them some distance away to avoid attracting predators.
