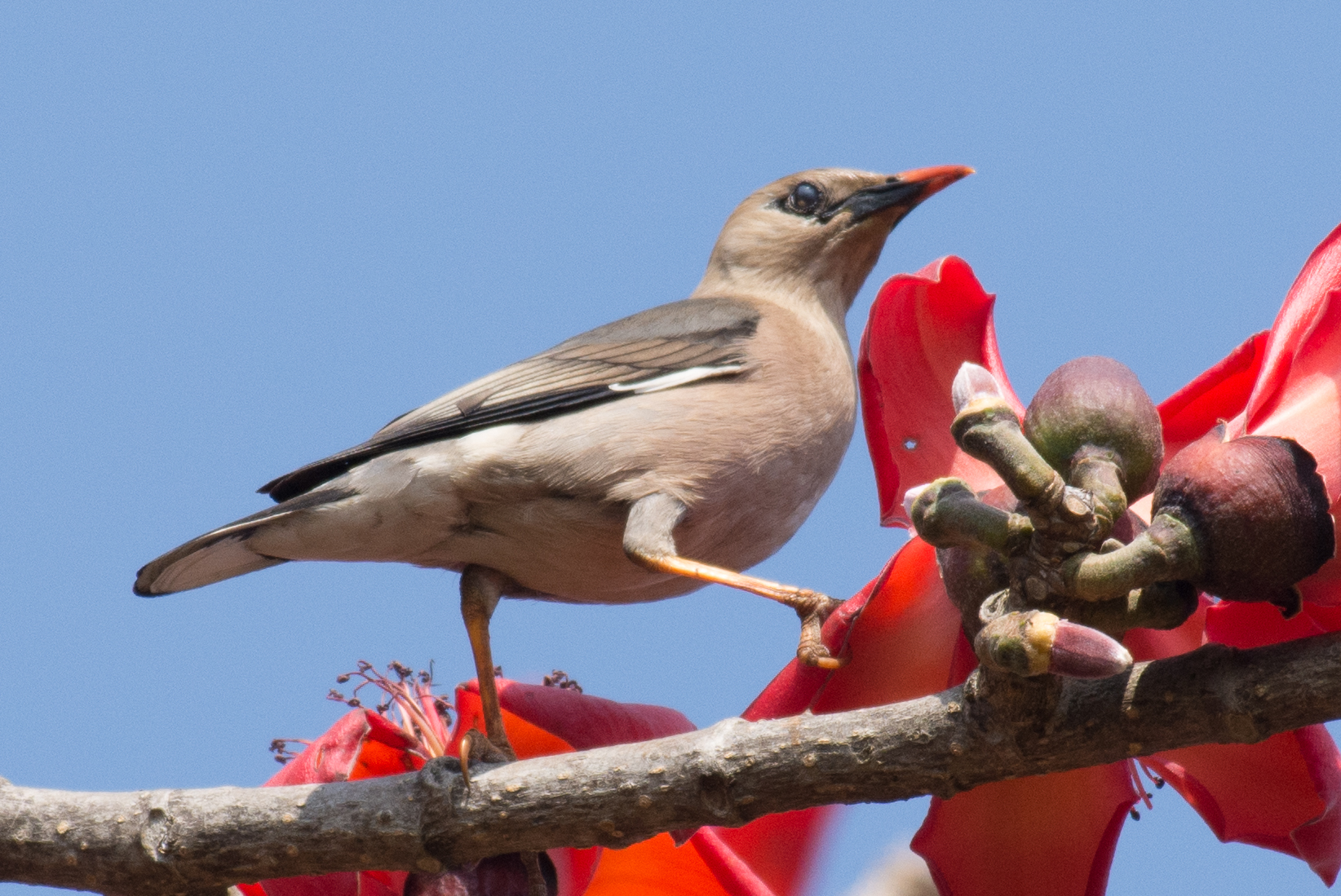

Conservation status
- Least Concern (IUCN 3.1)

Scientific classification
- Kingdom: Animalia
- Phylum: Chordata
- Class: Aves
- Order: Passeriformes
- Family: Sturnidae
- Genus: Acridotheres
- Species: A. burmannicus

Binomial name
- Acridotheres burmannicus (Jerdon, 1862)

Synonyms
- Sturnus burmannicus

= Burmese myna =

Species of bird

The Burmese myna (Acridotheres burmannicus) is a species of starling in the family Sturnidae. It is found in Myanmar and Yunnan, China.

== Taxonomy ==
The Burmese myna was considered conspecific with the vinous-breasted myna. Common names of the two split species were changed to "mynas" instead of "starlings" to match the genus.
