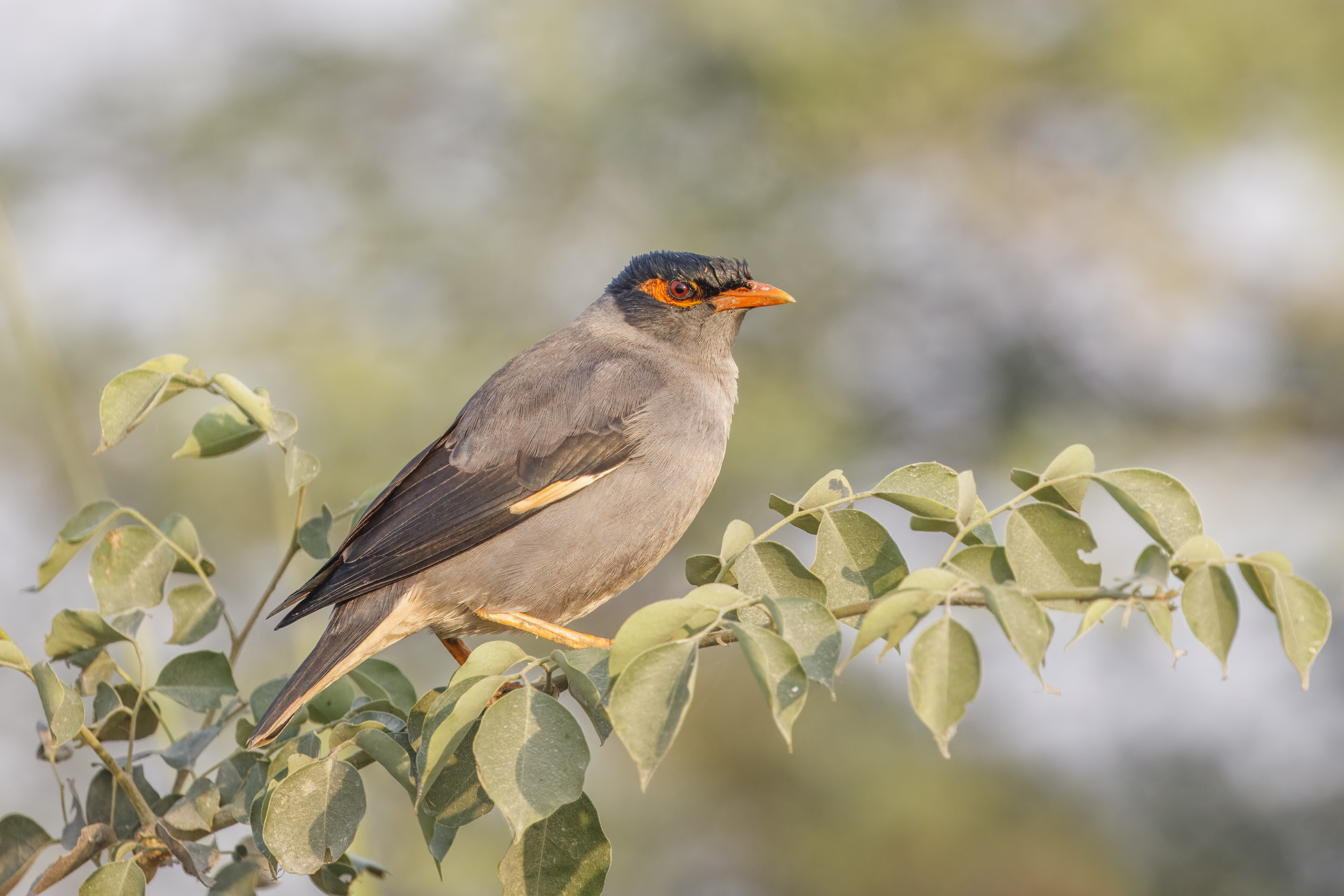
- Uttar Pradesh, India

Conservation status
- Least Concern (IUCN 3.1)

Scientific classification
- Kingdom: Animalia
- Phylum: Chordata
- Class: Aves
- Order: Passeriformes
- Family: Sturnidae
- Genus: Acridotheres
- Species: A. ginginianus

Binomial name
- Acridotheres ginginianus (Latham, 1790)

= Bank myna =

Species of bird

The bank myna (Acridotheres ginginianus) is a myna found in the northern parts of South Asia. It is smaller but similar in colouration to the common myna, only differing in having brick-red naked skin behind the eyes instead of yellow. It is greyer on the underside and in this and in the presence of a slight tuft of feathers bears some resemblance to the jungle myna. They are found in flocks on the plains of northern and central India, often within towns and cities. Their range appears to be extending southwards into India. The name is derived from their habit of nesting almost exclusively in the earthen banks of rivers, where they excavate burrows and breed in large colonies.

== Description ==
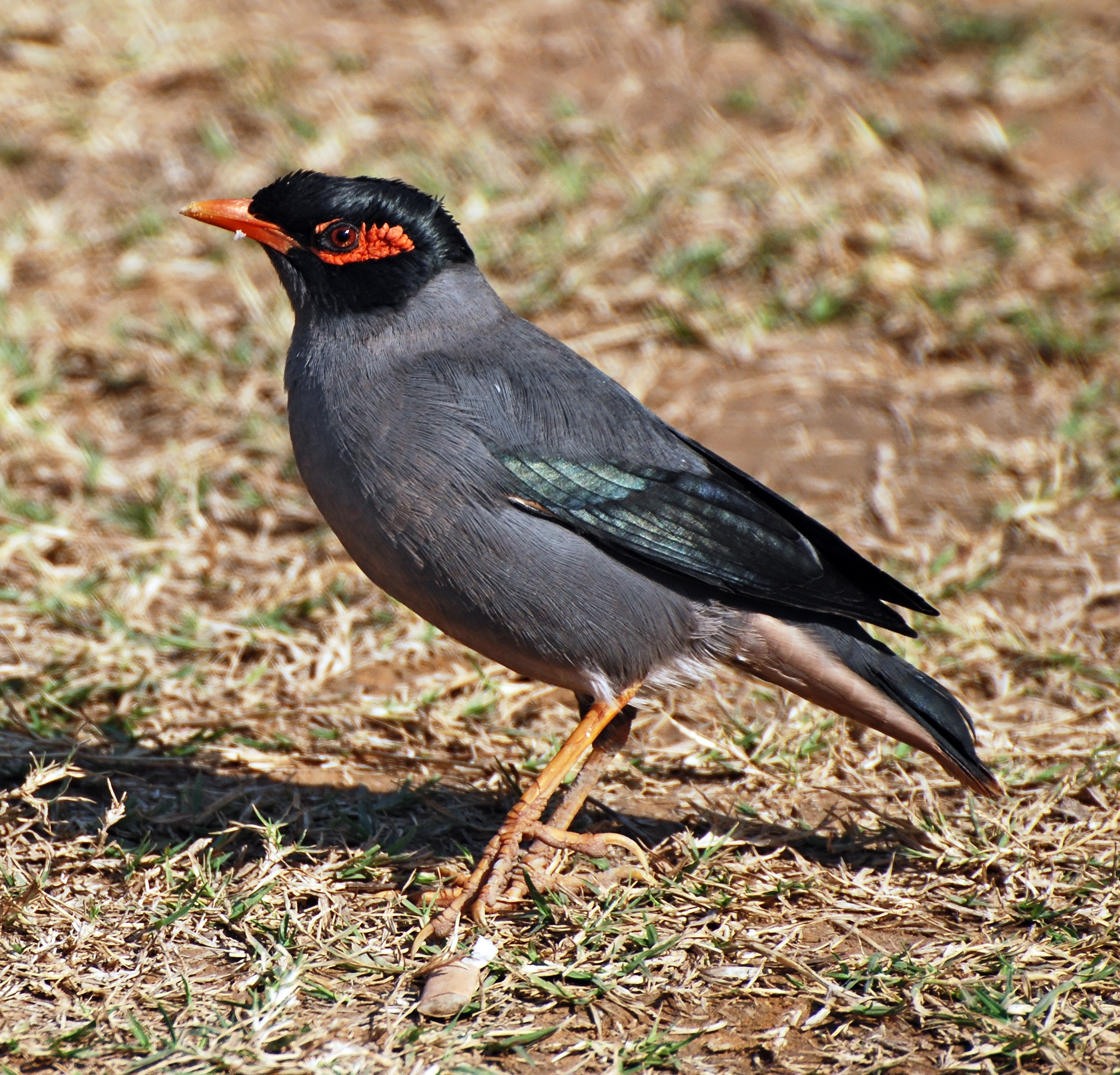
Some of the wing feathers show green gloss

The head is black on the crown and sides and the upper plumage is slaty grey while the underside is lighter grey with pale pink plumage towards the centre of the abdomen. The wing is black but has a wing patch at the base of the primaries and the tips of the outer tail feathers are pale pinkish buff. The naked skin behind the eye is brick red, the legs are yellow while the iris is deep red. The sexes are indistinguishable in the field. Young birds have a browner head and neck.

The species is evolutionarily closest to the common myna.

== Habitat and distribution ==
The native range of the bank myna is almost restricted to the Indian subcontinent from the Indus valley in the West to the Gangetic delta in the East and south of the lower foothills of the Himalayas, only rarely being found in sheltered valleys. They are found mainly in the vicinity of open water and their usual habitat is cultivated farmland and open country, but flocks will often live within cities, in markets and railway stations. They make use of food scraps disposed by humans, even following catering vehicles at airports to standing aircraft.

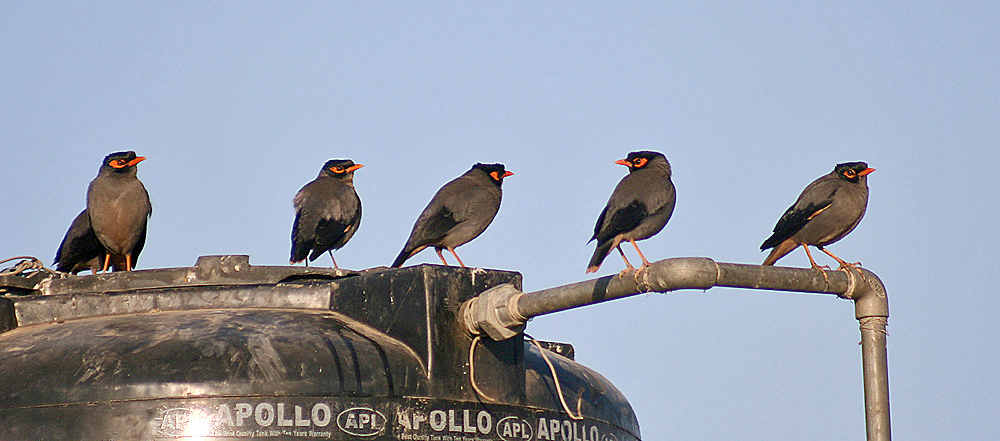
Bank myna at Hodal, Haryana, India

The distribution was formerly noted to be restricted north, roughly, of a line between Bombay and Balasore in Orissa, but the species may be expanding its range. They are also common in Pakistan in the districts of Sind and Punjab. A specimen from Kandahar was earlier considered the westernmost record of a vagrant, but the birds have since established themselves in the region. Although mainly resident, they make movements in response to food and weather. The species name of the bird is based on the name given by Latham from a description by Pierre Sonnerat who described Le petit Martin de Gingi in 1782, referring to Gingee near Pondicherry in southern India. Thomas C. Jerdon noted in 1863 that the species did not occur in southern India however the species was recorded in the region in 1914 at Vandalur near Madras. Records from further south in India are, however, increasing since 2000. Breeding colonies have been found in Assam.

These mynas have been introduced into Kuwait, where they have become established in the wild. Flocks have also been found in the Maldives, Taiwan and Japan.

== Behaviour and ecology ==
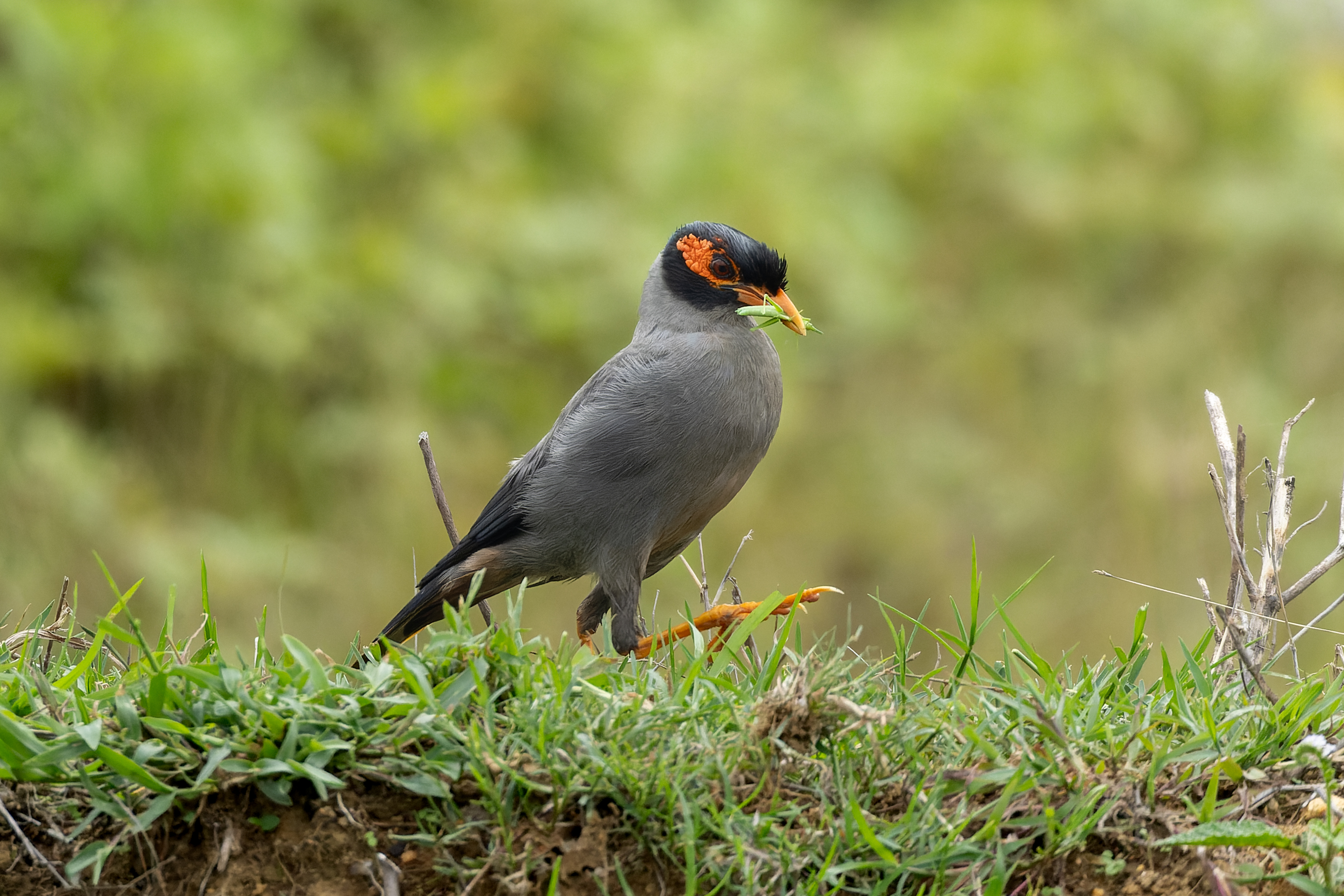
Eating insect in Ajodhya Hills, West Bengal, India.

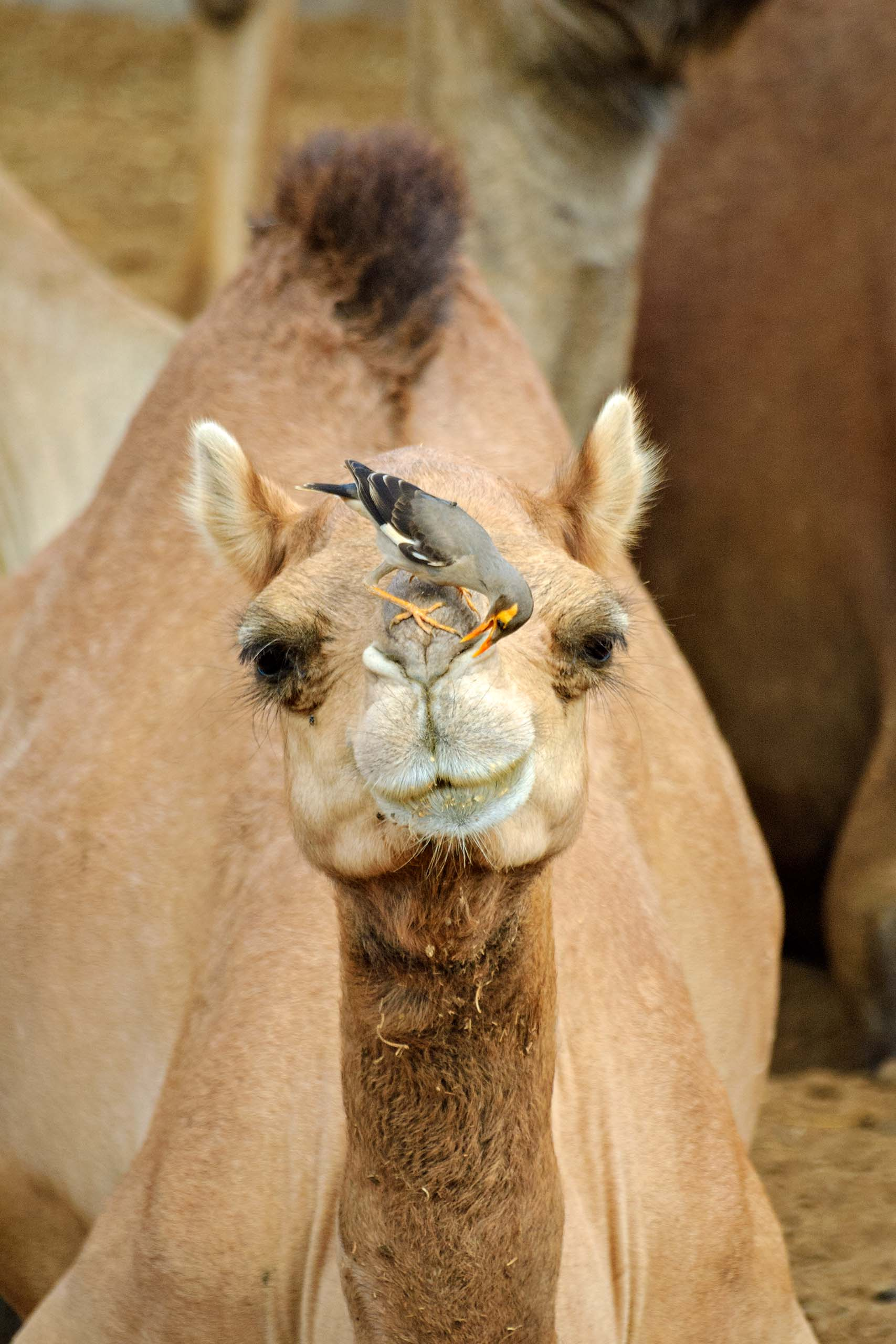
Bank myna bird (Acridotheres ginginianus) pecks camel nose clean, Bikaner, India

Bank mynas are gregarious foraging in flocks, breeding colonially and roosting together in trees. They perch on livestock and live in crowded towns allowing close approach, often picking up scraps in markets and dumps. They are vociferous and use a wide range of calls that include clucks, croaks, screeches, whistles and warbling elements.

Bank mynas feed on grain, insects and fruits. Like the common myna, they sometimes follow grazing animals picking up disturbed insects or even ticks on the animals. They feed on ripening crops such as those of sorghum, grape and pearl millet. They feed on a variety of insects, including some that are crop pests such as Achaea janata whose caterpillars feed on castor.

Bank mynas have a nesting season from April to July or August, most birds breeding in May and June. The nest is always built in earth walls, on the banks of rivers, embankments or the sides of open wells. They will sometimes make use of holes in brick walls. Nests have also been recorded between stacked bales of sugarcane stalks. They excavate the nest hole, the egg chamber sometimes 4 to 7 feet from the entrance. The nest is lined with grass, feathers and sometimes snake sloughs. About four of five pale sky blue or greenish-blue eggs is the usual clutch. Two broods may be raised in the same season. The eggs hatch after about 13 to 14 days. Nestlings open their eyes after about 5 days and fledge in about 21 days. About 38% of the eggs hatched into young that fledged in one study.

A species of coccidian parasite, Isospora ginginiana, and several species of nematode (Oxyspirura, Choanotaenia, Hymenolepis sp.) have been described from the species.

== Other sources ==
- Dhindsa, MS (1980). "Bank Myna Acridotheres ginginianus (Latham): A good predator of House-Flies, Musca domestica L.". Science & Culture. 46 (8): 294.
- Fawcus, LR (1943). "Note on the distribution of the Bank Myna in Eastern Bengal". J. Bengal Nat. Hist. Soc. 17 (4): 119.
- Jior, RS; Dhindsa, Manjit S; Toor, HS (1995). "Nests and nest contents of the Bank Myna Acridotheres ginginianus". Tigerpaper. 22 (1): 25–28.
- Khera, S; Kalsi, RS (1986). "Diurnal time budgets of the Bank Myna, Acridotheres ginginianus (Sturnidae) during prelaying, laying and incubation periods". Pavo. 24 (1&2): 25–32.
- S Khera; R S Kalsi (1986). "Waking and roosting behaviour of the Bank Myna, Acridotheres ginginianus, in Chandigarh and surrounding areas". Pavo. 24 (1&2): 55–68.
- Parasara, UA; Parasharya, BM; Yadav, DN (1991). "Studies on the nestling food of the Bank Myna Acridotheres ginginianus (Latham)". Pavo. 28 (1&2): 37–42.
- Parasharya, BM; Dodia, JF; Mathew, KL; Yadav, DN (1996). "The role of birds in the natural regulation of Helicoverpa armigera Hubner in wheat". Pavo. 34 (1&2): 33–38.
