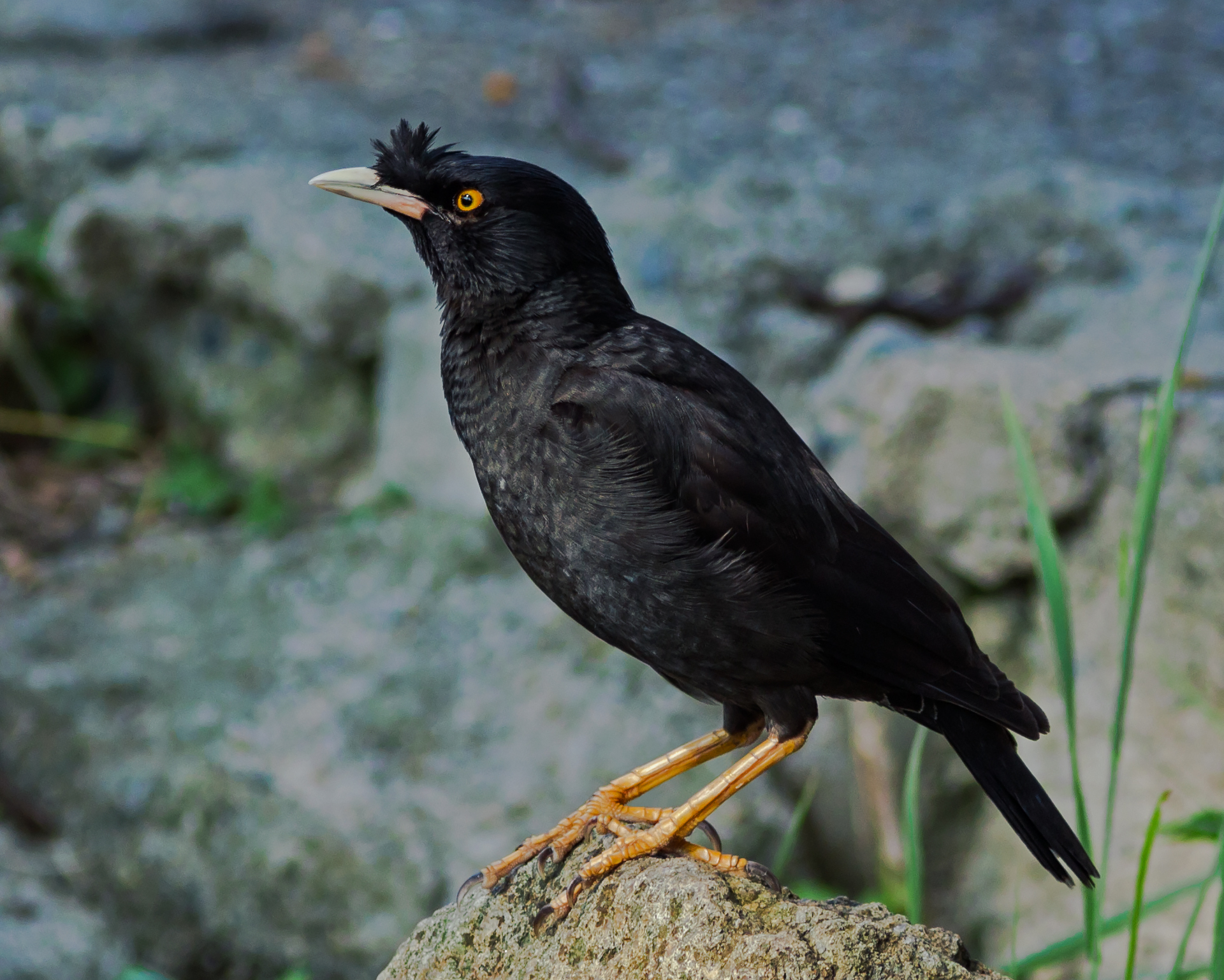

Conservation status
- Least Concern (IUCN 3.1)

Scientific classification
- Kingdom: Animalia
- Phylum: Chordata
- Class: Aves
- Order: Passeriformes
- Family: Sturnidae
- Genus: Acridotheres
- Species: A. cristatellus

Binomial name
- Acridotheres cristatellus (Linnaeus, 1758)

Synonyms
- Gracula cristatella Linnaeus, 1758

= Crested myna =

Species of bird

The crested myna (Acridotheres cristatellus), also known as the Chinese starling, is a species of starling in the genus Acridotheres native to southeastern China and Indochina. It is named after the tuft of feathers on its forehead that resembles a crest.

The crested myna is typically found in open spaces near urban and agricultural areas. It is a popular cage bird and, as a result, has been accidentally released in a few places outside of its usual range. For example, this species was introduced around 1890 into the Vancouver region of British Columbia. It was initially successful, reaching a population in the thousands, however, it has since then gone locally extinct in the area.

Like many starlings, the crested myna is omnivorous. It will eat a variety of food including worms, grubs, grains, fruit, and even garbage. It is a highly beneficial bird to farmers, as it feeds on insects and does not attack crops.

== Taxonomy ==
In 1743 the English naturalist George Edwards included a picture and a description of the crested myna in his A Natural History of Uncommon Birds. He used the English name "Chinese starling or Black Bird". When in 1758 the Swedish naturalist Carl Linnaeus updated his Systema Naturae for the tenth edition, he placed the crested myna with the other mynas in the genus Gracula. Linnaeus included a brief description, coined the binomial name Gracula cristatella and cited Edwards' work. The specific epithet cristatella is a Latin diminutive of cristatus meaning "crested" or "plumed". The crested myna is now placed in the genus Acridotheres that was introduced in 1816 by the French ornithologist Louis Pierre Vieillot. It was previously placed in the genus Aethiospar, which included the mynas that had a fully feathered or tufted face. Acridotheres was formerly the group of bare-skin faced mynas. Now, the two genera form a new group that keeps the name Acridotheres.

Three subspecies are recognised:

- A. c. cristatellus (Linnaeus, 1758) – south and southeast China
- A. c. brevipennis Hartert, E, 1910 – Hainan Island (off southeast China) and Indochina
- A. c. formosanus (Hartert, E, 1912) – Taiwan

== Description ==
The crested myna is named after the tuft of feathers that form a crest-like structure on its forehead that covers the bird's nostrils. It is mostly black with a slight green sheen. It has a couple of white wing patches under its wings which are more visible during flight. The tips and the base of the primaries are white. The tail feathers also have white tips with the exception of the middle pair. The under-tail coverts are black with a white tip. The adult's eyes are orange, its bill is pale yellow, and its legs are a dull dark yellow. Its bill is slender and very sharp. The males are slightly larger than the females. The female's crest is slightly less well-developed. Otherwise, there is no sexual dimorphism. The subspecies A. c. brevipennis, has proportionally smaller wings and a smaller bill. The feathers that form the crest are narrower than the ones from the nominate subspecies. A. c. formosanus is slightly smaller than the nominate subspecies and its bill is greenish-yellow. Its under-tail coverts are white and it has a more developed crest.

The hatchlings are born naked except for of a short gray down found on certain parts of the bird. In about 18 to 20 days, the juveniles become fully covered with brown feathers. The crest is usually not well developed at this stage. Immature crested mynas have blue-gray eyes.

== Distribution and habitat ==
The crested myna can be found in a wide range of habitats from urban to rural areas. In cities, it can be seen in the eaves of buildings, along roads and alleys, near gardens and parks, in parking lots. It can be found under bridges, in trees, in chimneys, and on roofs. In rural areas, it can be spotted on agricultural fields, in orchards and farmyards, near manure piles. It can be seen near plowed fields to take advantage of the invertebrates found in the tilled soil. It is often seen near cattle as it eats the insects around them. It is also commonly distributed in grasslands, fields and at the edge of forests.

The range spans from southeastern and central China to northern Indochina. It is found in the Yangtze valley and the southeastern Jiangxi Province in China. The crested myna has also been recorded in Burma, Taiwan and Hainan.

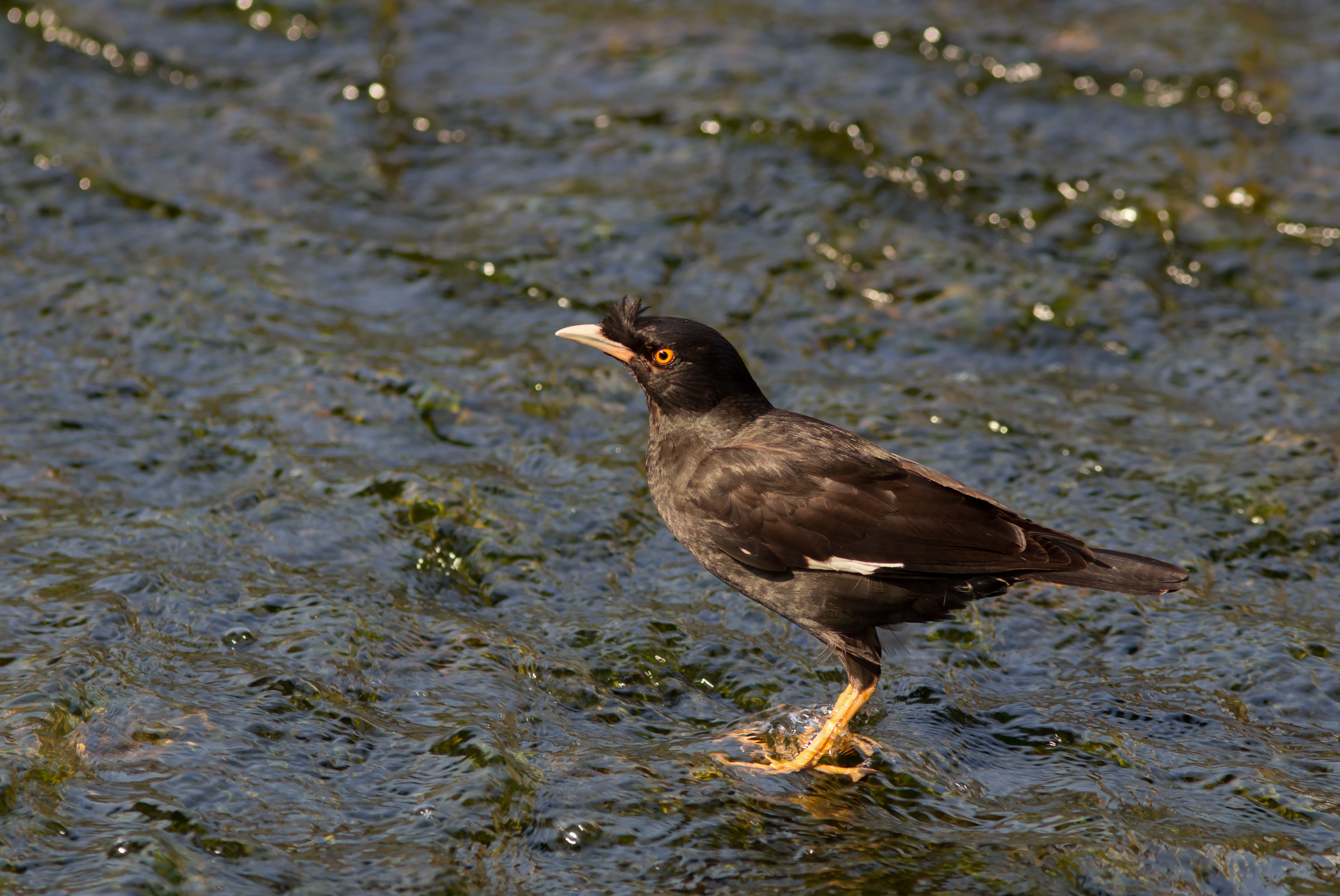
A crested myna wades in water

As a popular cage bird, it is often transported outside of its normal range and, on occasion, can be accidentally released and introduced in a new area. For example, in the late 1800s, it was introduced to Vancouver, British Columbia. It was able to proliferate and its population grew to around 20,000 to 30,000 individuals. It could be found anywhere from the south of the province to Washington and Oregon. By the mid-20th century, the numbers began declining, and the bird is now extirpated in North America. Other examples of the crested myna's introduction can be seen in Portugal. The bird was discovered breeding around Lisbon, Portugal in 1997. They are now established on both sides of the Tagus estuary to the west of Lisbon and also on the Setúbal Peninsula.

The crested myna has also been successfully introduced in Penang, Singapore, Manila, as well as parts of Japan and Argentina. The Crested myna is called "Martinez" in the Philippines.

In the European Union, due to the significant negative impacts of its introduction to the ecosystem, it is included in the list of invasive alien species of Union concern and hence cannot be imported, bred, transported, commercialized, or intentionally released into the environment in any of its member states.

== Behaviour ==
=== Vocalization ===
The crested myna has a wide array of songs and calls, from whistles to warbles to chortles. When alarmed, it emits a raspy jaaay. Other calls include a series of chuffs or creeks. Vocal mimicry of human voices and other yard birds in crested mynas has been reported. However, birds held in captivity were not found to be good mimics.

=== Diet ===
The crested myna is an omnivorous bird. Although it eats mainly insects, this bird can eat a wide variety of items including fruit, grains, meat, manure and garbage.

Its diet varies seasonally. On average, 40% of the adult bird's diet is meat and 60% is vegetation. However, in September, the proportion of meat in its diet increases to around 50–60%, where almost half of it is flies. In the winter months, as insects and fruit are less common, the crested myna eats a lot more garbage (representing about 15% of its diet).

Its diet also varies with the life stages of the bird. Juveniles eat proportionally more animal matter than adults Approximately 75% of their diet is made of meat (50% of which is from insects). Similarly to adult crested mynas, the proportion of insects and fruit that the juveniles eat increases with availability and abundance.

=== Reproduction ===
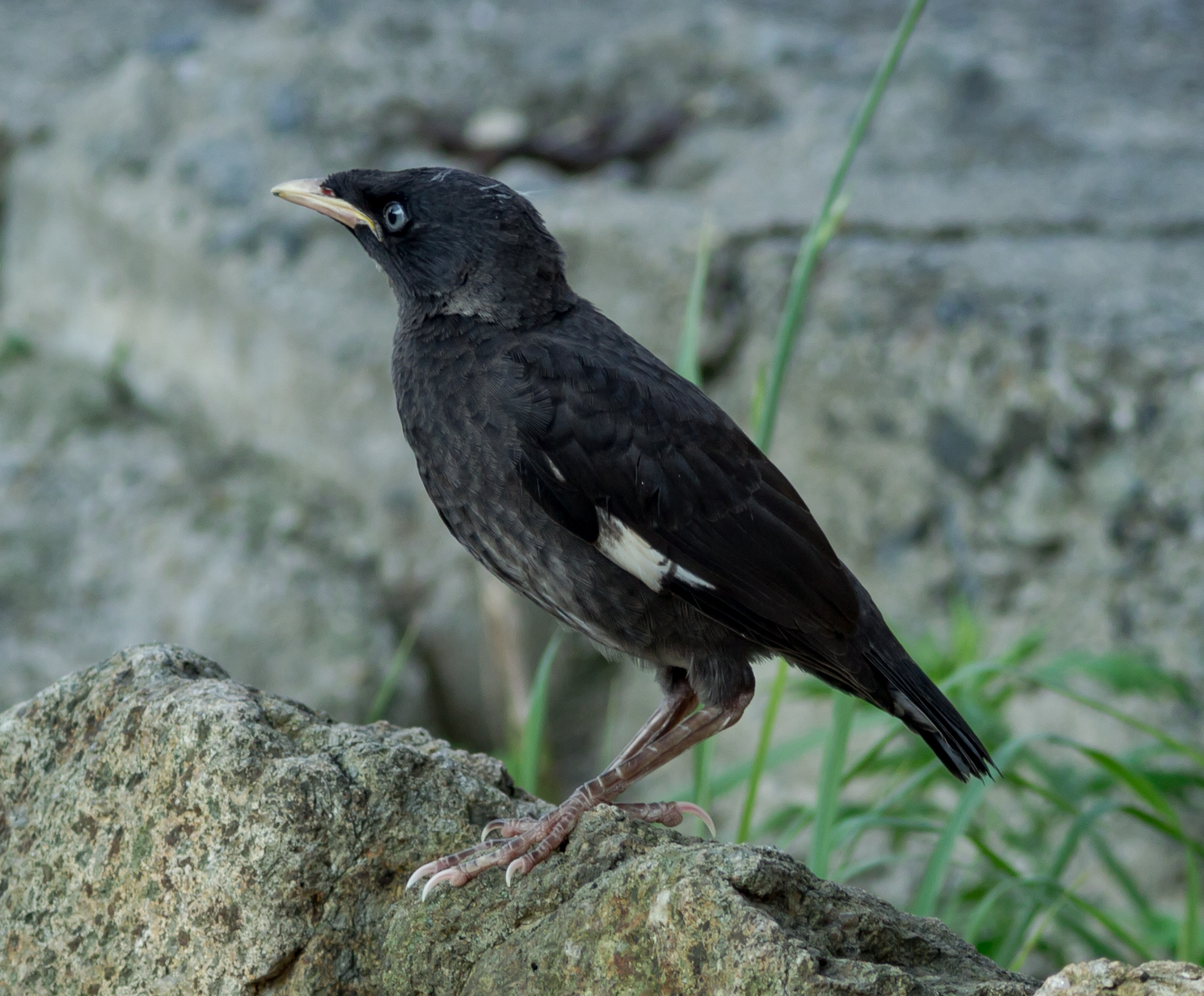
A fledgling

The crested mynas build their nests in a variety of places. In a forest, it builds its nest in holes caused by woodpeckers or decay. In urban areas, the nests can be found in chimneys, drains, and crevices among other places. Most nests are built in April or May. Both the male and the female take part in the construction of the nest. To build the nest, the crested mynas have been known to use just about anything they can find from grass to branches to garbage.

The first clutch of the season appears during the end of April or during May. Most pairs are double-brooded, which means they will have a second clutch in the same season. The second clutch appears in June to mid-August. The eggs are of a light blue-green color and have a similar shape to that of robin eggs. Typically, the clutch size is around 4–6 eggs. Every day, one egg is hatched. The hatchlings are born altricially. The eggs are incubated for 14 days, after which the fledglings move out of the nest onto a nearby tree or shrub. The parents keep feeding them for about a week.

The immature crested mynas do not separate from their parents. They typically form small family groups and form a larger flock with others for feeding and traveling.

== Status and conservation ==
Since 1998, the crested myna has been rated as a species of Least Concern on the IUCN Red List of Endangered Species. It has a range that is larger than 20,000 km^{2} and therefore, its range is too large for this bird to be considered vulnerable under the criterion of range size. Also, the population trends seem to be stable (over the last ten years or three generations) and so, this bird cannot be considered vulnerable under the criterion of population trends. Finally, it is believed that the population size exceeds 10,000 mature individuals and therefore its this bird cannot be considered vulnerable under the criterion of population size.
