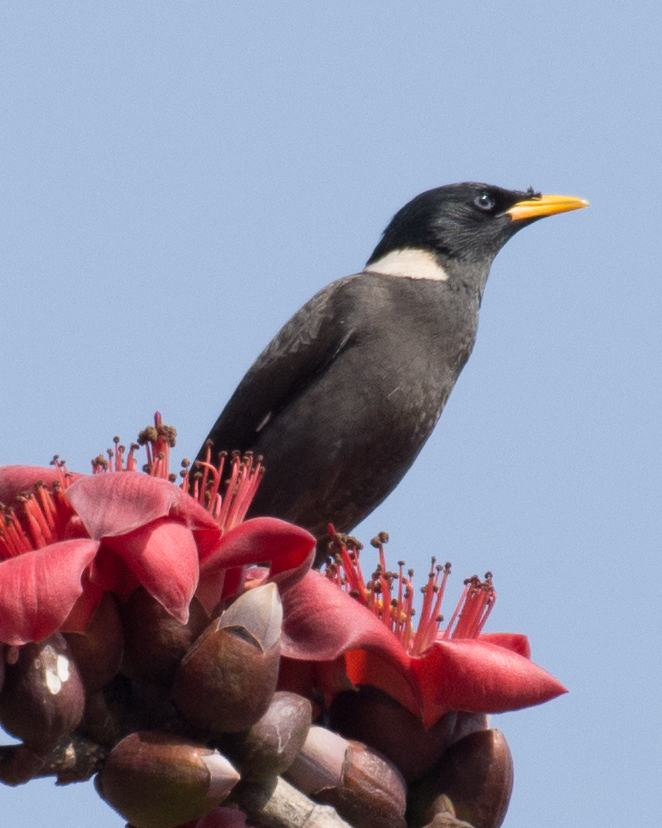

Conservation status
- Least Concern (IUCN 3.1)

Scientific classification
- Kingdom: Animalia
- Phylum: Chordata
- Class: Aves
- Order: Passeriformes
- Family: Sturnidae
- Genus: Acridotheres
- Species: A. albocinctus

Binomial name
- Acridotheres albocinctus Godwin-Austen & Walden, 1875

= Collared myna =

Species of bird

The collared myna (Acridotheres albocinctus) is a species of starling in the family Sturnidae.

It is found in China, India, and Myanmar.

It is omnivorous.
