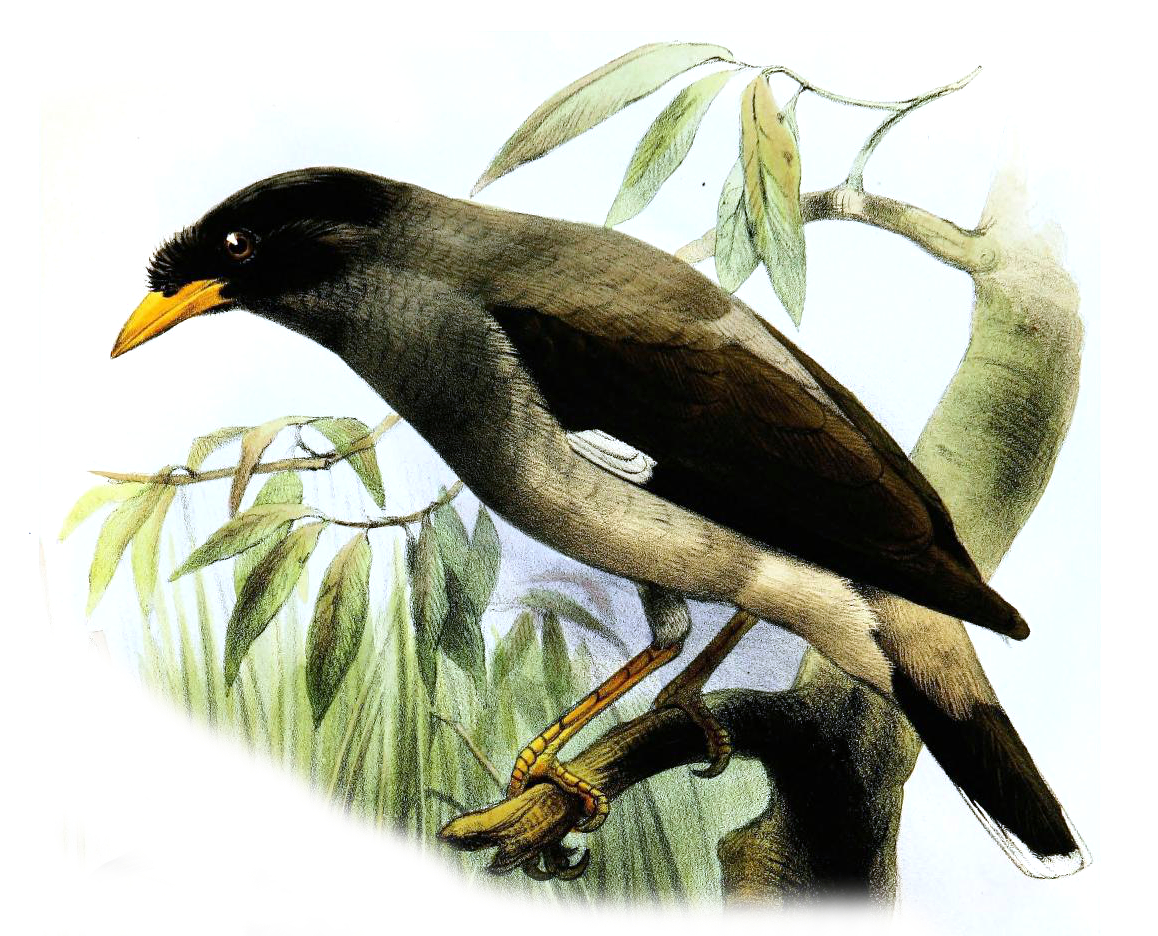

Conservation status
- Vulnerable (IUCN 3.1)

Scientific classification
- Kingdom: Animalia
- Phylum: Chordata
- Class: Aves
- Order: Passeriformes
- Family: Sturnidae
- Genus: Acridotheres
- Species: A. cinereus

Binomial name
- Acridotheres cinereus Bonaparte, 1850

= Pale-bellied myna =

Species of bird

The pale-bellied myna (Acridotheres cinereus) is a species of starling in the family Sturnidae. It is endemic to the southwestern peninsula of Sulawesi (south from Ranteapo), Indonesia. It has been introduced to Tawau, Sabah (Borneo).

== Taxonomy ==
The Pale-bellied myna is often confused with the name "white-vented myna". Therefore, the International Ornithologists' Union does not recommend using "white-vented myna" and recommends using "Javan myna" instead.

== Description ==
The crested myna has a gray back and ashy-gray breast paling to buffy-gray on the belly with a white vent. The crown and cheeks are black with dark-blackish wings and tail. Like most mynas, the Pale-bellied myna features a white wing bar and tail bar. The bill is amber and the legs and feet are yellow. Immatures are also browner.
