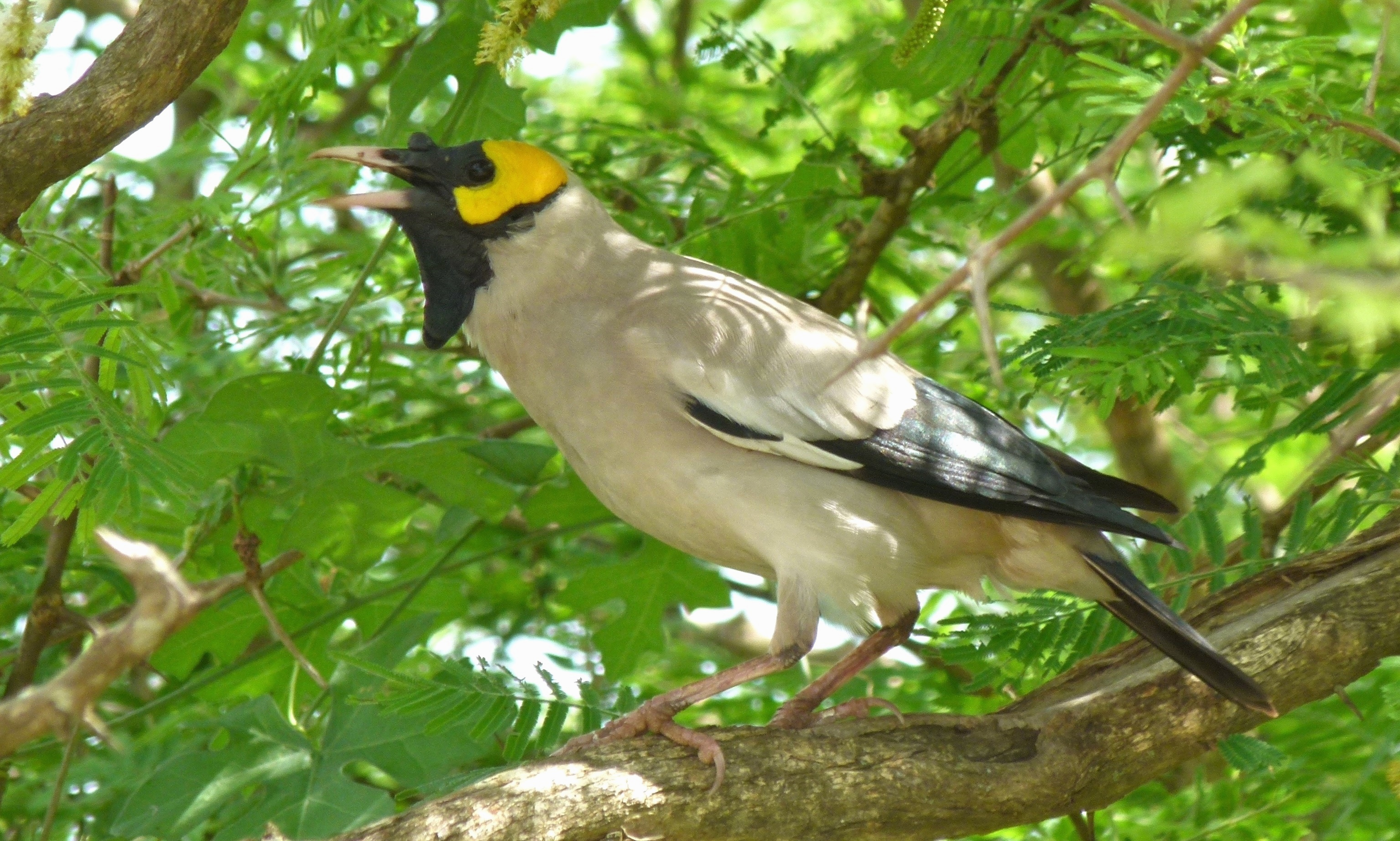
- Breeding male
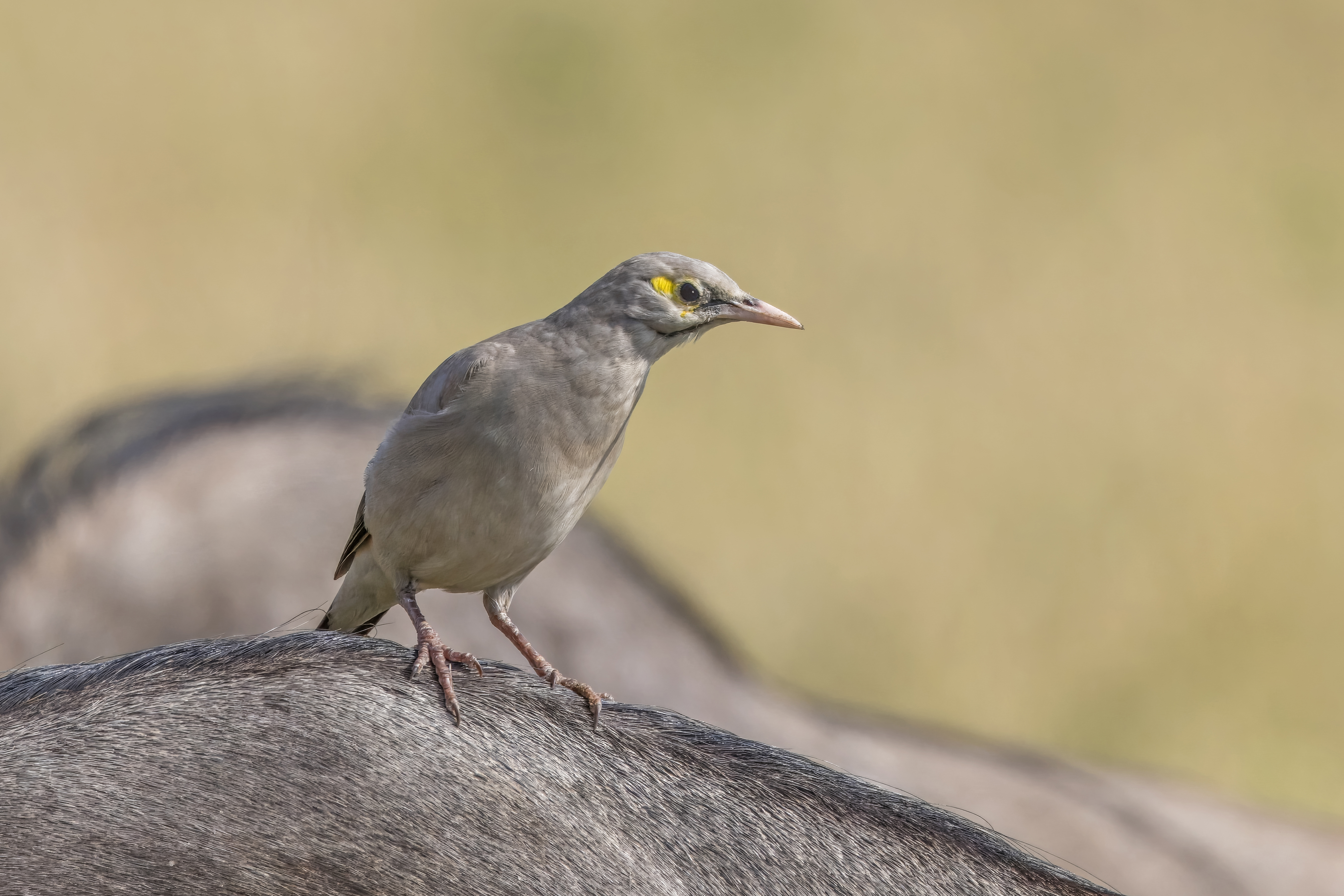
- Female

Conservation status
- Least Concern (IUCN 3.1)

Scientific classification
- Kingdom: Animalia
- Phylum: Chordata
- Class: Aves
- Order: Passeriformes
- Family: Sturnidae
- Genus: Creatophora; Lesson, 1847
- Species: C. cinerea

Binomial name
- Creatophora cinerea (Meuschen, 1787)

= Wattled starling =

Species of bird

The wattled starling (Creatophora cinerea) is a nomadic resident bird in eastern and southern Africa. It is a species of grassland, open woodland, and cultivation.

This is the only African starling that appears to show affinities with the Asian starlings, particularly the genus Sturnus. Its bare face patches and ability to open-bill feed in grassland are unique amongst African starlings. It is the only member of the genus Creatophora.

This common species appears to be extending its range into West Africa and has also occurred in Arabia, Madagascar, and Seychelles.

== Description ==
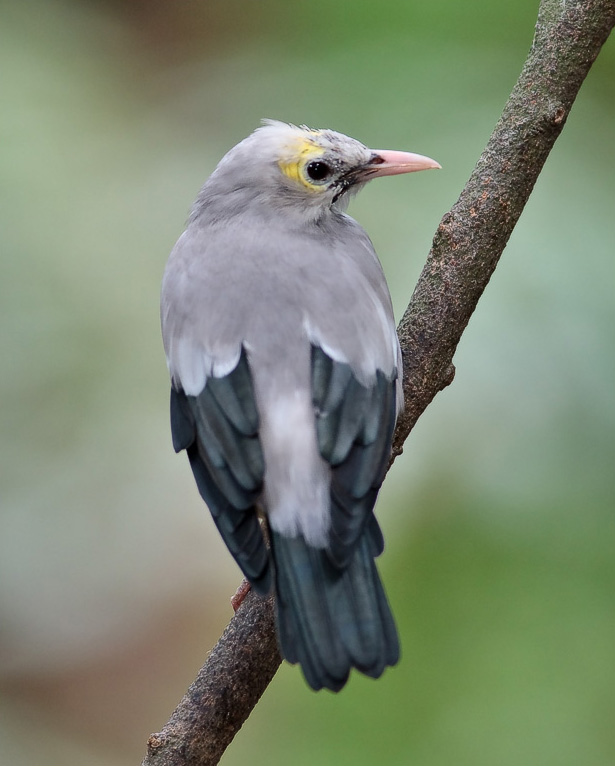
Non-breeding male

The wattled starling is 21 cm long, with a short tail and pointed wings. It has mainly grey plumage except for a white rump, and black flight feathers and tail. The breeding male has a white shoulder patch and a distinctive head pattern, with unfeathered yellow skin, and black forehead and throat wattles. The extent to which these seasonal features develop increases with the age of the bird and some old females may show a weaker version of this plumage.

The non-breeding male has a feathered head except for a small yellow patch behind the eye. There are no wattles, but there is a black moustachial stripe. The white shoulder patch is much reduced. The female and juvenile plumages are similar to the non-breeding male, but the flight feathers and tail are brown.

The black flight and tail feathers and white rump make this species unmistakable in flight.

This species has a range of wheezing or grating calls comparable to those of the common starling, but the most familiar is a wheezing ssreeeeo.

== Behaviour ==
=== Breeding ===
The wattled starling is a colonial breeder, and may share its colonies with the Cape weaver. It always nests in trees or bushes, including acacias and eucalyptus at between 1 and 10 m above the ground. The globular nest is made from twigs and lined with grass or feathers. The two to five, usually three or four, eggs are pale blue, immaculate or with some brown spots, and are laid before the dome of the nest is completed. Both sexes build the nest, incubate the eggs and feed the young.

The eggs hatch after 11 days, and the chicks leave the nest in another 13–16 days. They cannot fly, and suffer heavy predation from large birds of prey.

Breeding is linked to an abundant insect supply, and colonies will be abandoned, even with chicks in the nest, if, for example, locust swarms are destroyed by control measures.

=== Roosting ===
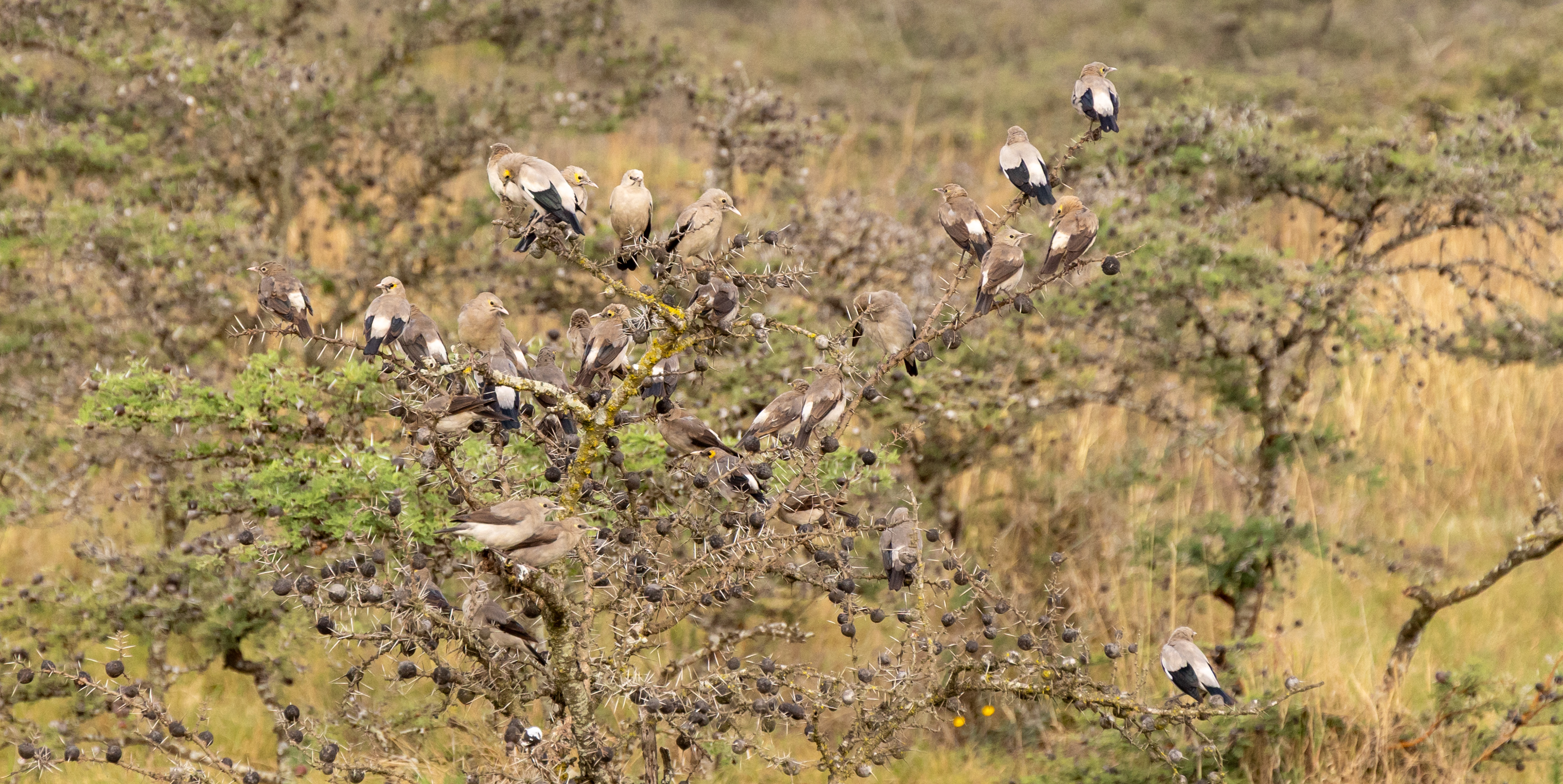
A flock of wattled starlings perched on an acacia bush in the Nairobi National Park, Kenya

The wattled starling is highly gregarious and will form large flocks, often with other starlings. Its reedbed roosts, which can be huge, may also be shared.

=== Feeding ===
Like other starlings, the wattled starling is an omnivore, taking a wide range of invertebrates seeds and berries, but its diet is mainly insects including many locusts, leading to the local name "locust bird".

It will scavenge at rubbish heaps, and frequently perches on livestock, feeding on insects disturbed by the animals and also removing ectoparasites.
