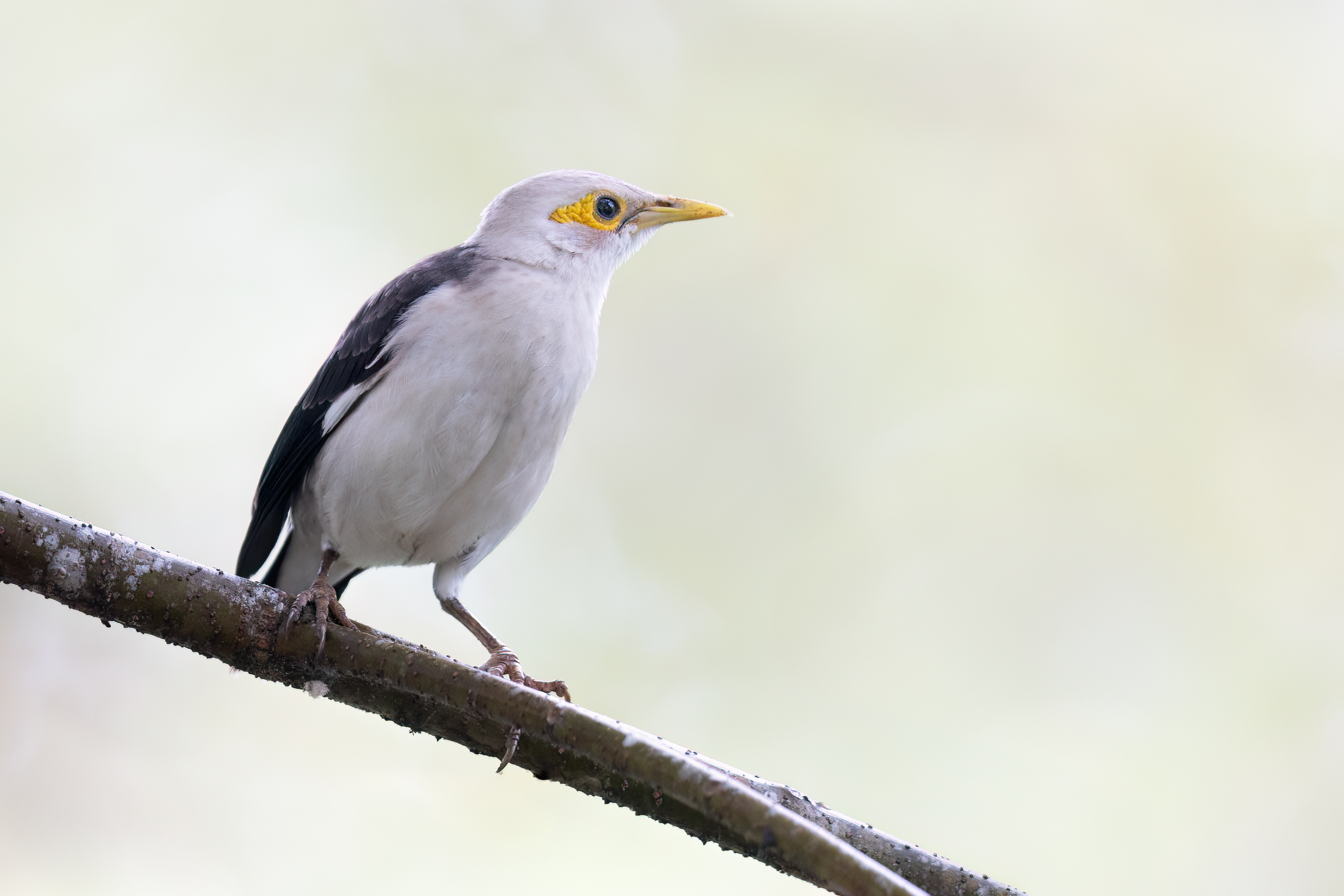

Conservation status
- Endangered (IUCN 3.1)

Scientific classification
- Kingdom: Animalia
- Phylum: Chordata
- Class: Aves
- Order: Passeriformes
- Family: Sturnidae
- Genus: Acridotheres
- Species: A. melanopterus

Binomial name
- Acridotheres melanopterus (Daudin, 1800)

Synonyms
- Sturnus melanopterus

= Black-winged myna =

Species of bird

The black-winged myna (Acridotheres melanopterus) is a species of starling in the family Sturnidae. The species is also known as the black-winged starling or the white-breasted starling. It is endemic to Indonesia. There are three recognised subspecies: the nominate race, which occurs across much of the island of Java; tricolor, which is restricted to south east Java; and tertius, which is found on Bali and possibly Lombok. The validity of the records on Lombok has been called into question, as there are only a few records and those may represent escapees from the caged-bird trade or natural vagrants. The species has often been assigned to the starling genus Sturnus, but is now placed in Acridotheres because it is behaviourally and vocally closer to the birds in that genus.

== Description ==
The black-winged myna is a small myna, 23 centimetres (9.1 in) in length. The plumage of this species is striking, with the head, breast, back and rump being white, and the tail and parts of the wings glossy black. The tip of the tail and parts of the wings are also white. The skin around the eye is unfeathered and yellow. The bill is yellow, and slightly darker towards the base. The sexes are alike, and young birds are like the adults except that juveniles' crown and back are grey. The subspecies tricolor is similar to the nominate but has a grey back and much more black on the wings. The subspecies tertius is similar to tricolor except the grey on the back descends to the tail.

== Distribution and habitat ==
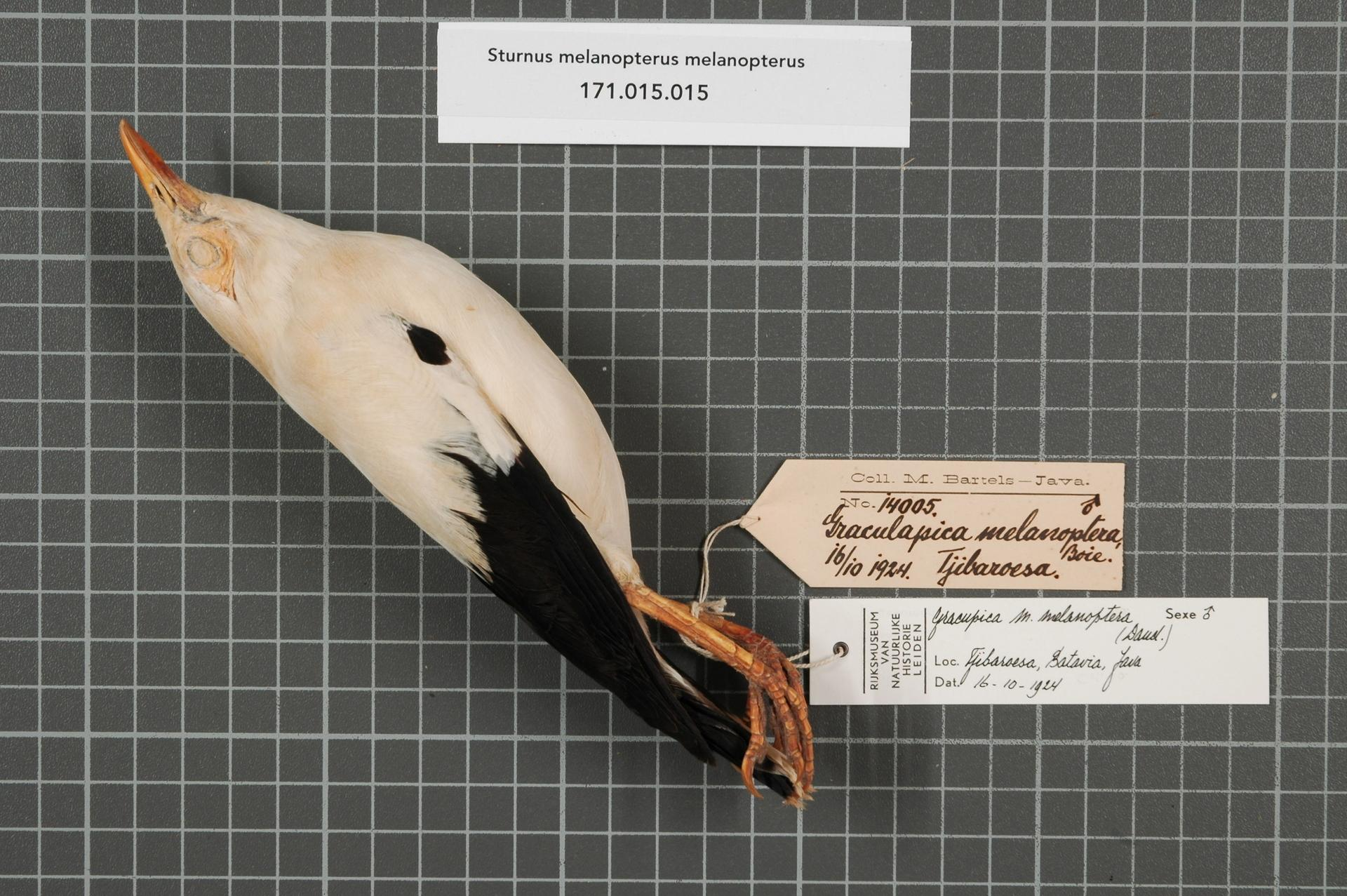
S. melanopterus melanopterus specimen, Collection Naturalis Biodiversity Center

Its natural habitats are tropical dry forests, tropical dry shrubland, tropical moist shrubland, and pastureland, from sea-level up to 2400 meters. Until recently it had adjusted to human-modified habitats well, moving into orchards, lawns, suburban areas and other cultivated land.

== Behaviour and ecology ==
The black-winged myna feeds on a variety of items, including fruit, nectar and insects. It feeds in small groups and in pairs, both in trees and on the ground. It roosts communally at night in groups, sometimes with other starling species like the Bali myna. It is a seasonal breeder, although the exact timing of the breeding season varies by location. Birds in west Java breed from March to May, but in east Bali the season is around June. They are apparently monogamous, nesting in a twig lined hole amongst rocks or in a tree.

== Status and conservation ==
The black-winged myna was once an abundant bird, so much so that it was considered a potential rival and threat to the threatened Bali myna. The species has declined, however, for much the same reasons as the Bali myna, principally collection for the caged-bird trade. The black-winged myna is one of the most popular species among collectors; in recent years the number of birds entering the trade has declined as they have become increasingly rare in the wild. It is believed that the population has declined by at least 80% over the last 10 years. The species is also potentially threatened by changes in agricultural processes, and scientists are also concerned about genetic variation being lost as escapees mix the three subspecies. Escapees of this species briefly formed a breeding population in Singapore, but that population is now thought to be extinct. A captive breeding program has been started at Cikananga Wildlife Rescue Center in West Java, and produced 200 chicks by 2012. Twenty-five of these birds were used to supplement the wild population, using nest boxes that local villages had produced. Several reintroductions were planned, one at Antam Pongkor Gold Mine in Gunung Halimun Salak National Park and another Rawadanau Nature Reserve in Banten Province, though the former was setback after the property was transferred to national park authorities, who immediately relaxed trapping prevention, resulting in the decline from forty individuals to eight.
