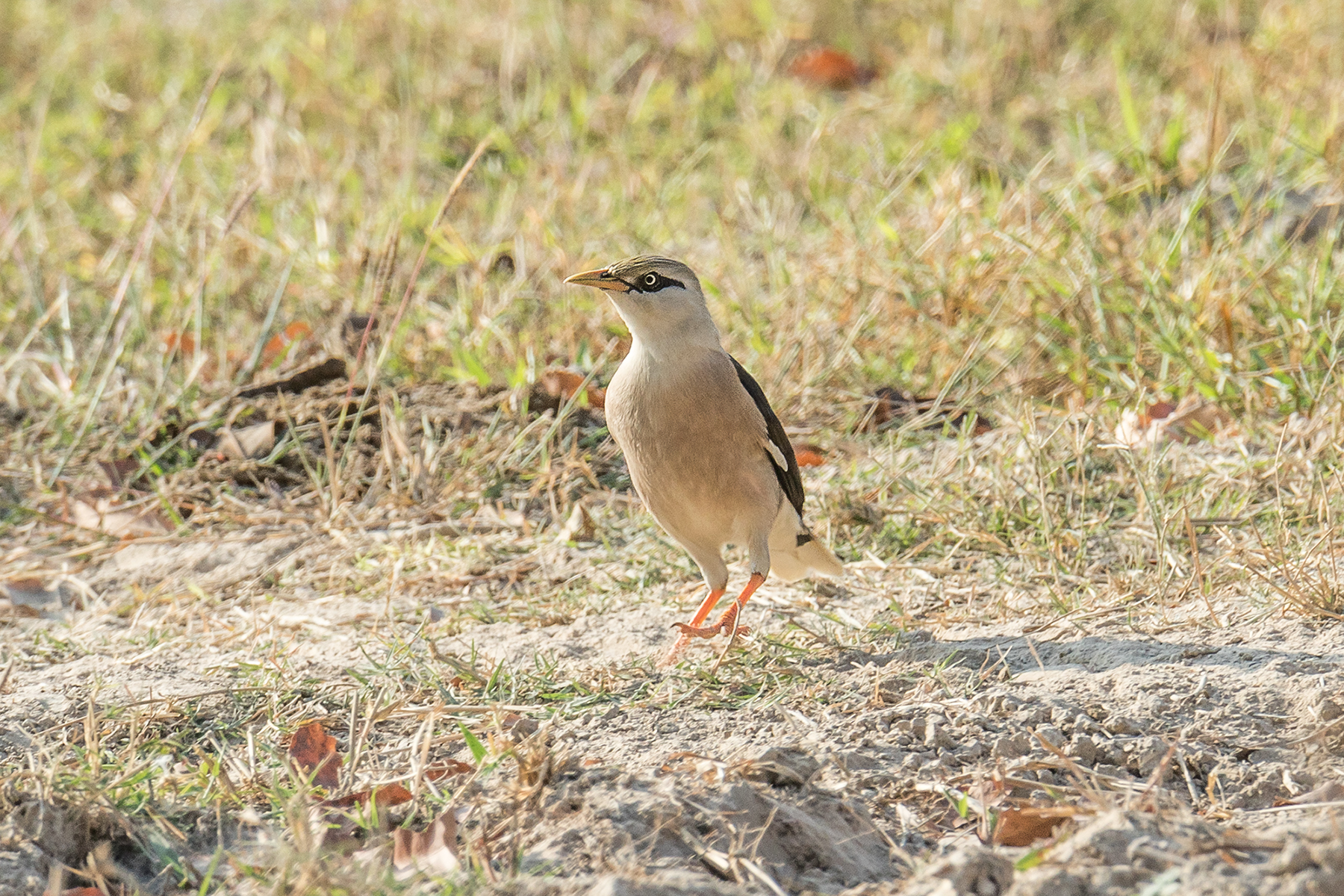

Conservation status
- Least Concern (IUCN 3.1)

Scientific classification
- Kingdom: Animalia
- Phylum: Chordata
- Class: Aves
- Order: Passeriformes
- Family: Sturnidae
- Genus: Acridotheres
- Species: A. leucocephalus

Binomial name
- Acridotheres leucocephalus Giglioli & Salvadori, 1870

= Vinous-breasted myna =

Species of bird

The vinous-breasted myna or vinous-breasted starling (Acridotheres leucocephalus) is a species of starling in the family Sturnidae.

It is found in Thailand, Laos, Cambodia, and Vietnam.

== Description ==
It has a yellowish bill and grey upperparts.
