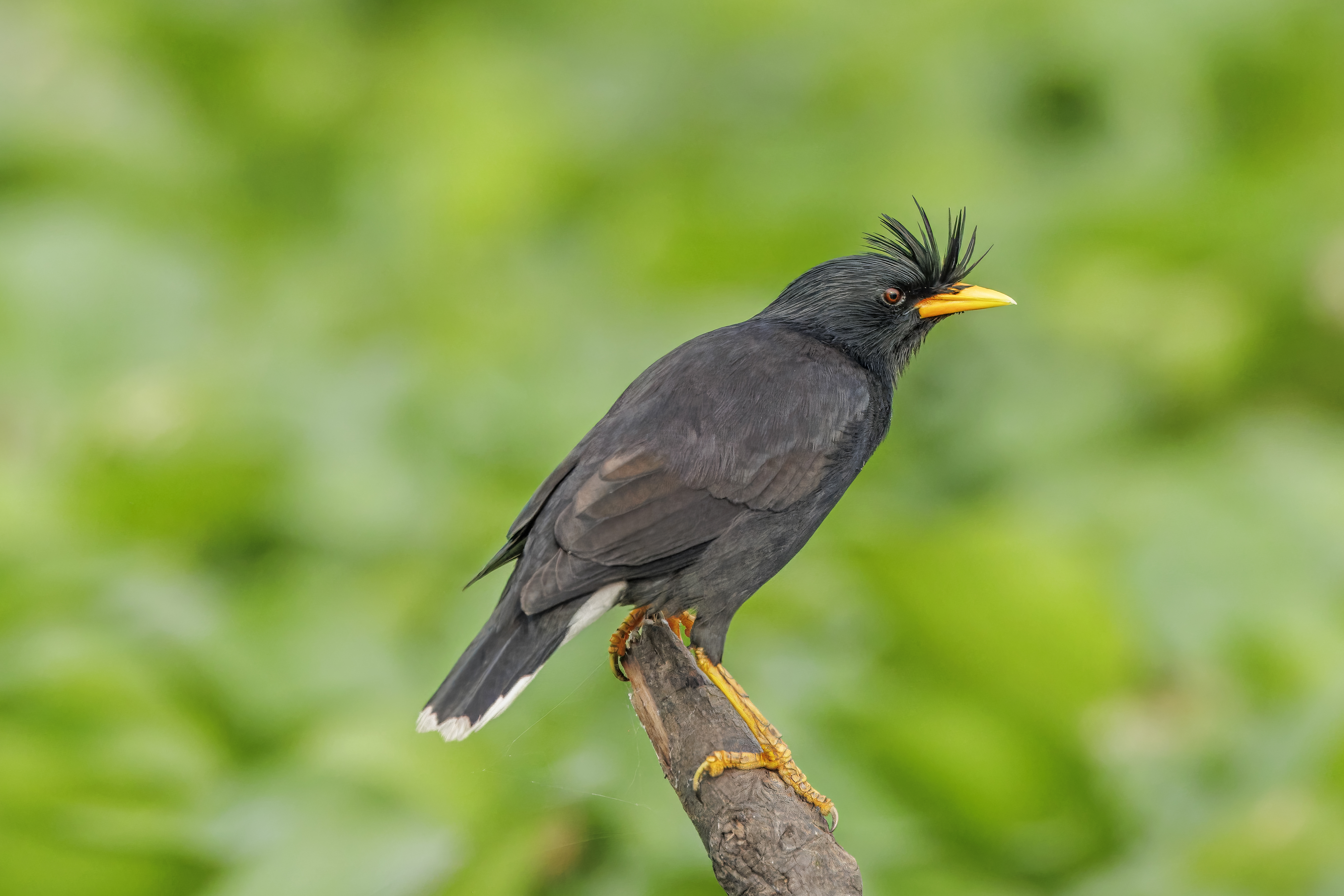
- In Cambodia

Conservation status
- Least Concern (IUCN 3.1)

Scientific classification
- Kingdom: Animalia
- Phylum: Chordata
- Class: Aves
- Order: Passeriformes
- Family: Sturnidae
- Genus: Acridotheres
- Species: A. grandis

Binomial name
- Acridotheres grandis Moore, F, 1858

= Great myna =

Species of bird

The great myna (Acridotheres grandis), also known as the white-vented myna, is a species of starling in the family Sturnidae. Its range extends from Sikkim across Northeast India and Indochina.

== Description ==
It is black with elongated forehead feathers, forming a frontal crest that may curl backwards. Its beak and feet are yellow. It has white from the vent to the tip of the tail and a white wing patch.

== Images ==
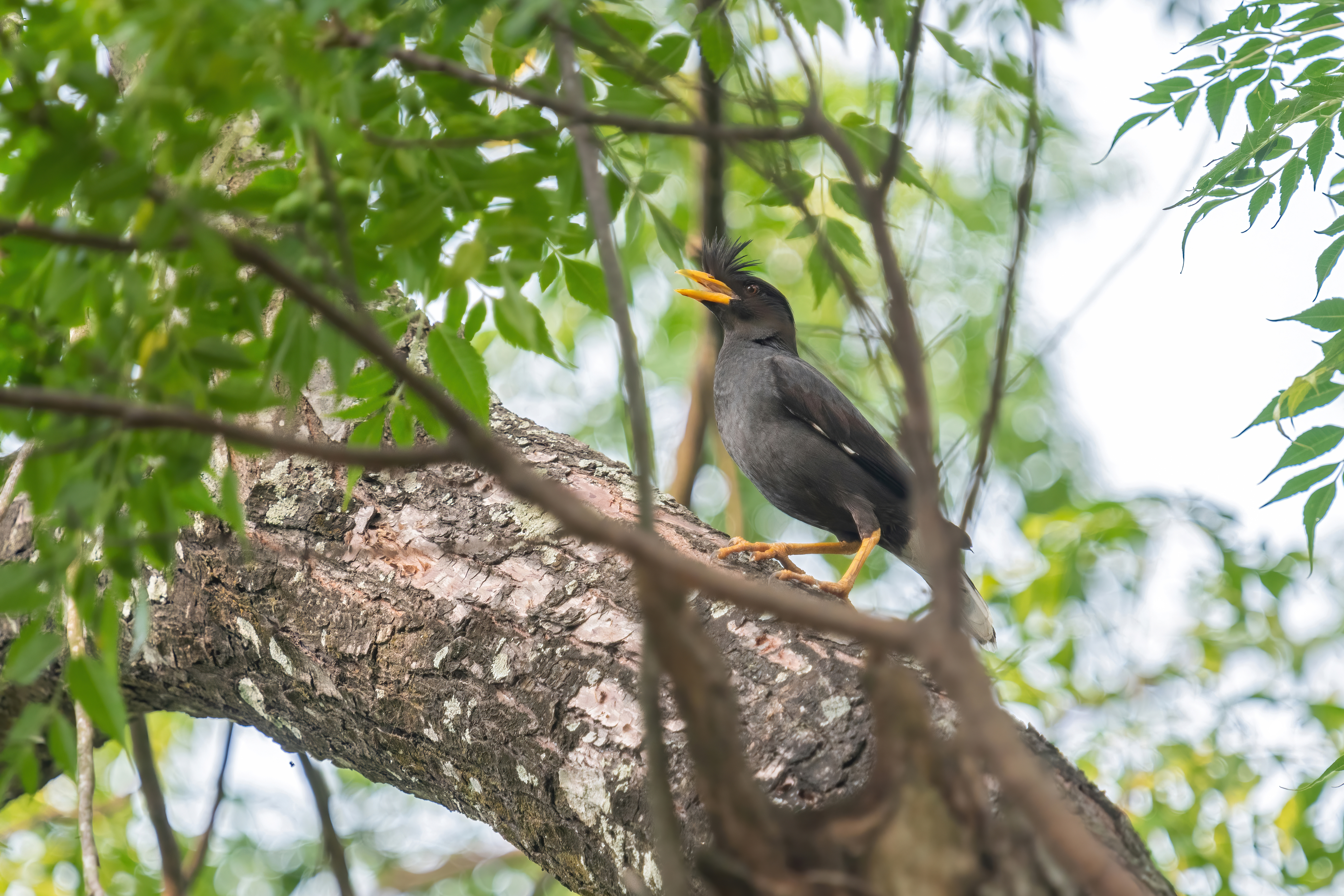
At Koshi Tappu Wildlife Reserve, Nepal

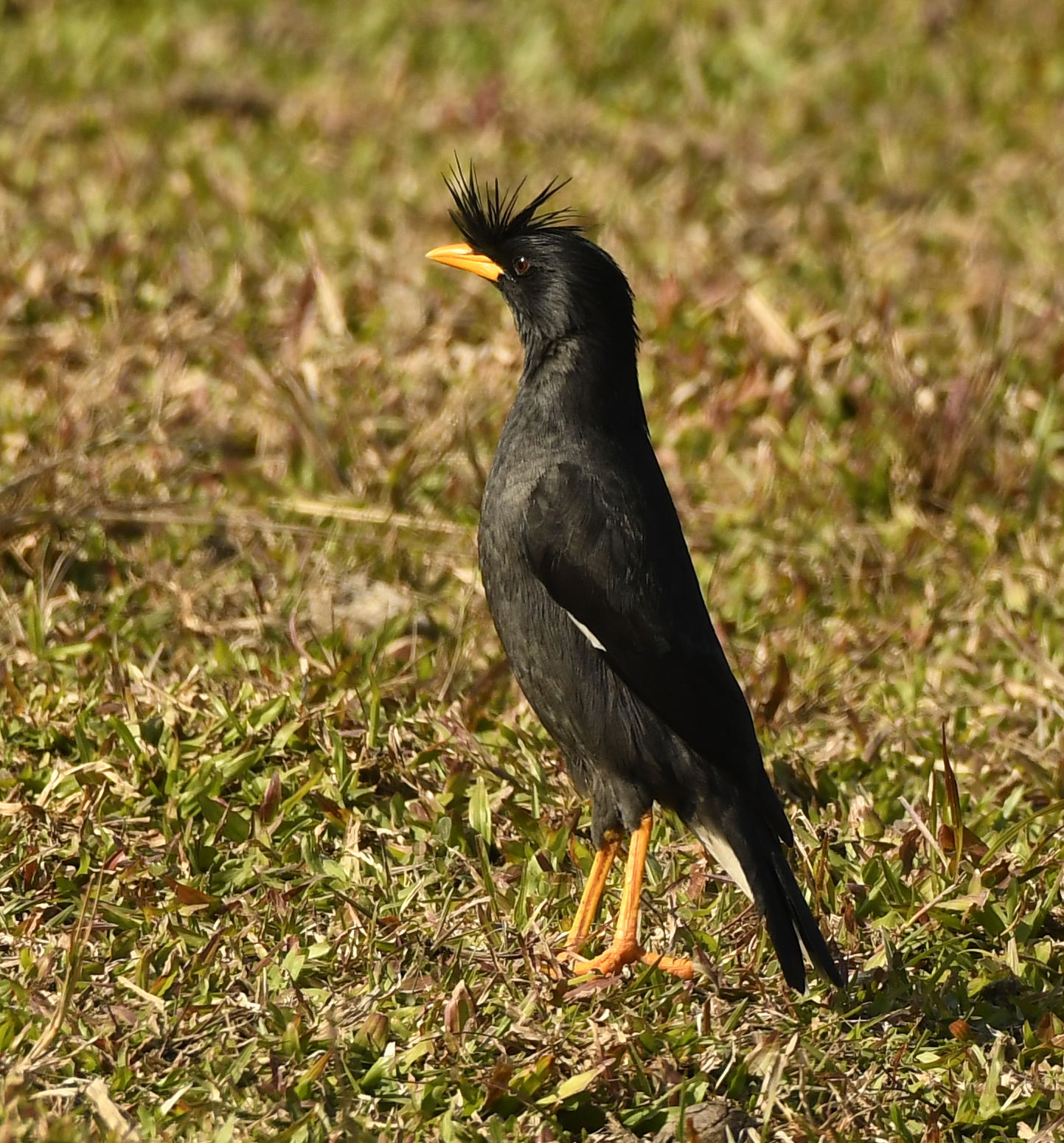
At Kaziranga National Park, Assam, India

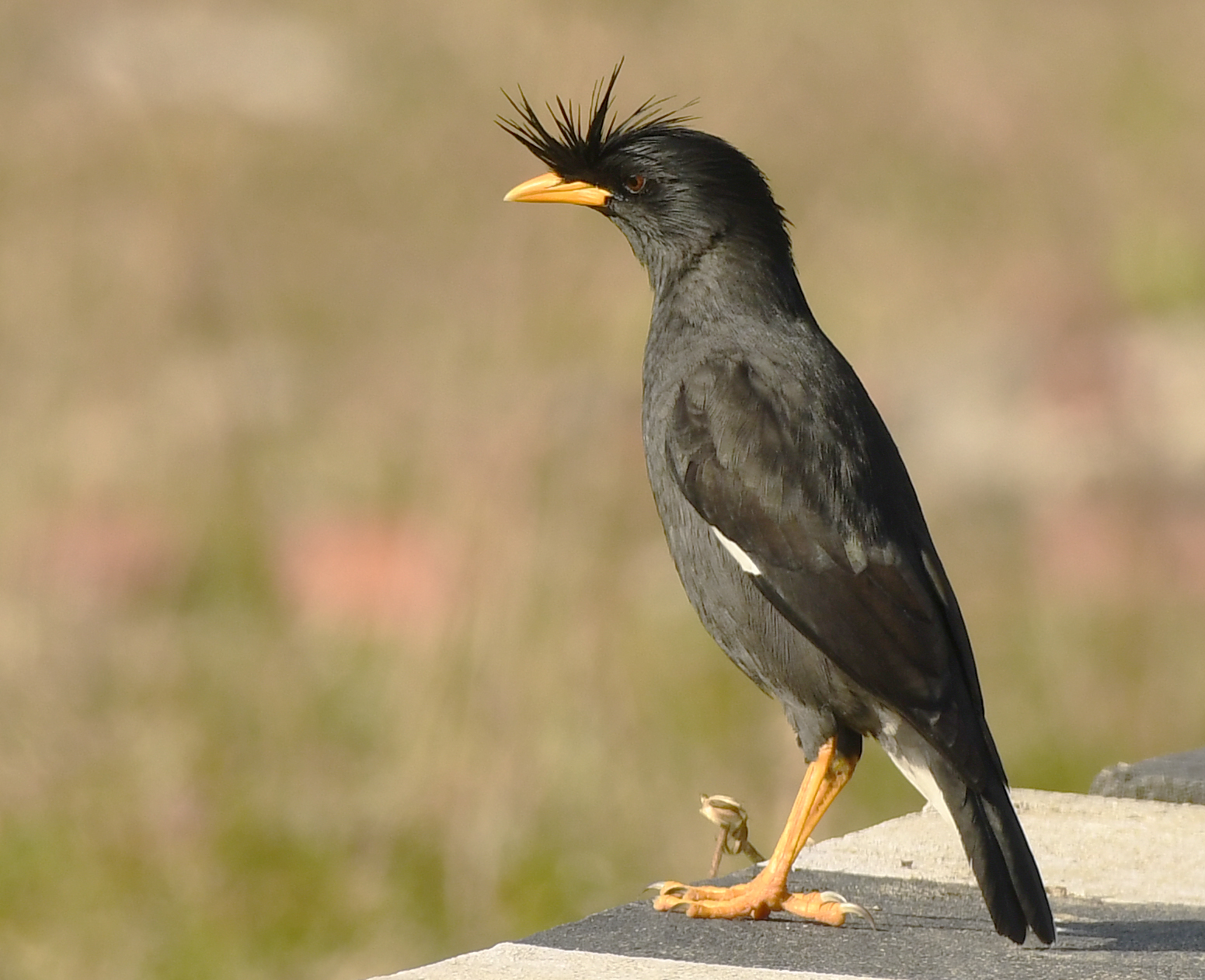
At Kaziranga National Park, Assam, India

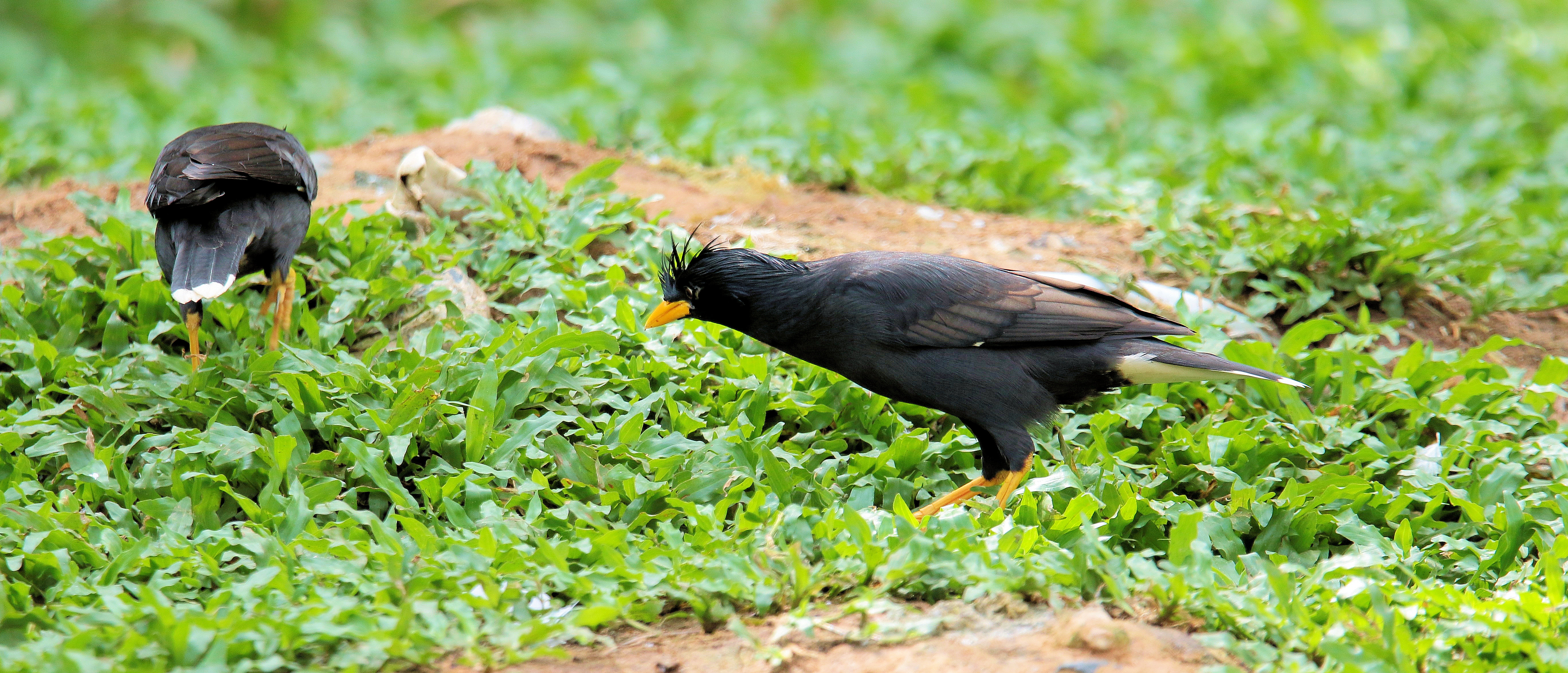
Great myna, Phu Quốc, Vietnam
