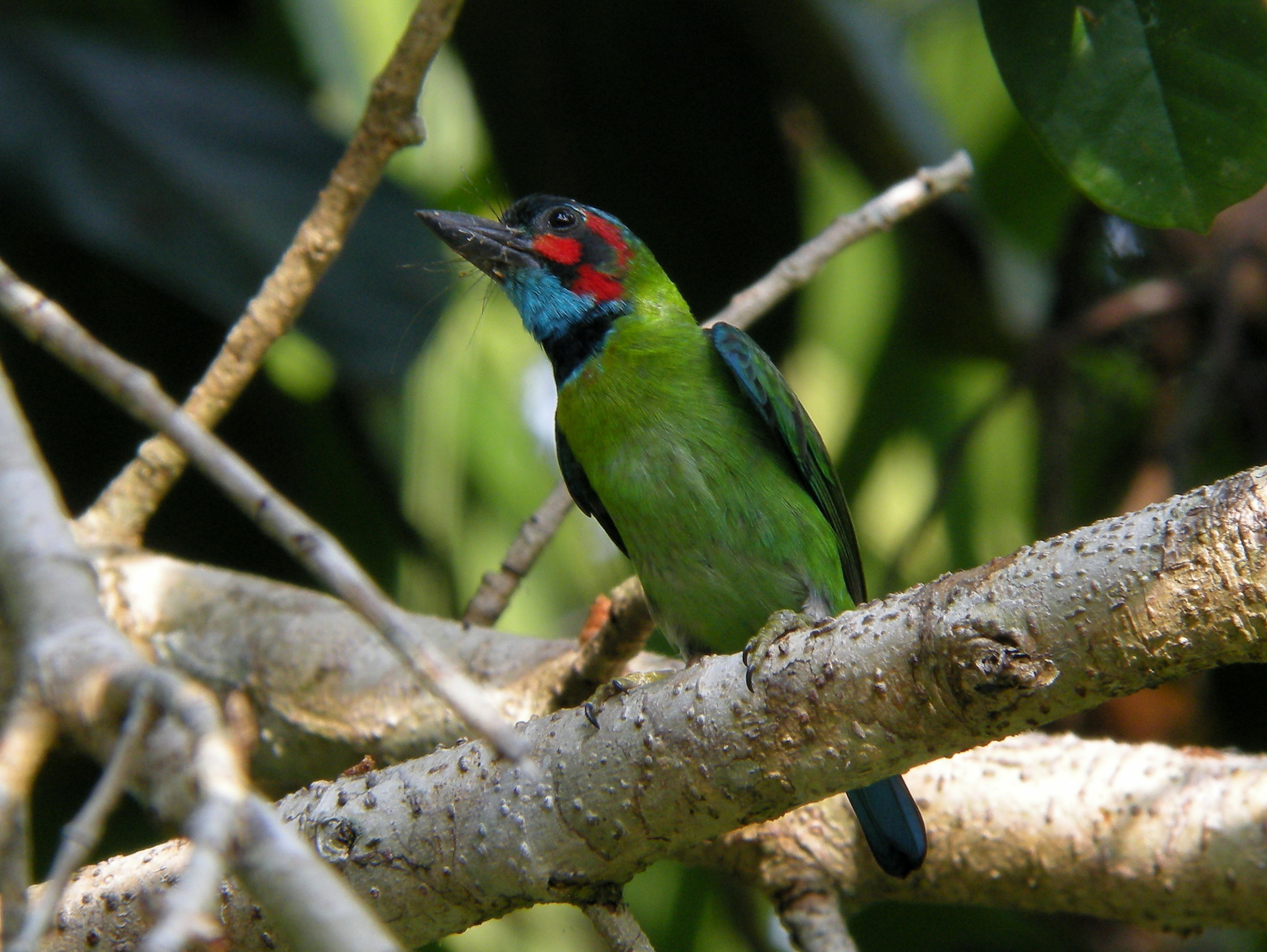

Conservation status
- Least Concern (IUCN 3.1)

Scientific classification
- Kingdom: Animalia
- Phylum: Chordata
- Class: Aves
- Order: Piciformes
- Family: Megalaimidae
- Genus: Psilopogon
- Species: P. duvaucelii

Binomial name
- Psilopogon duvaucelii (Lesson, 1830)

Synonyms
- Bucco duvaucelii Lesson, 1830

= Black-eared barbet =

Species of bird

The black-eared barbet (Psilopogon duvaucelii) is a barbet in the family Megalaimidae native to Peninsular Malaysia, Sumatra and Borneo. It inhabits shrubland and forest up to an elevation of 1,200 m (3,900 ft). Because of its large range, it is listed as least concern on the IUCN Red List.

== Characteristics ==
The black-eared barbet has olive-green plumage, a blue throat and nape, a black beak and a large black streak between the eyes. Below the eyes it has red spots encircled by black. It is 16–17 cm (6.3–6.7 in) long and weighs 26.3–37 g (0.93–1.31 oz).

== Taxonomy ==
Bucco duvaucelii was the scientific name proposed by René Lesson in 1830 who described a barbet from Sumatra. The generic name Psilopogon was proposed by Salomon Müller in 1836, initially for a fire-tufted barbet (P. pyrolophus) from Sumatra. In subsequent decades, about 19 generic names were proposed for barbet species, including Megalaima by John Edward Gray in 1849 and Mezobucco by George Ernest Shelley in 1889. Taxonomists used different generic names when describing barbets in collections of natural history museums.

Mezzobucco duvaucelii gigantorhinus was proposed by Harry C. Oberholser in 1912 for an adult male barbet with a large bill from Nias Island. Mezzobucco duvaucelii tanamassae was proposed by Rodolphe Meyer de Schauensee in 1929 for a male barbet from the Batu Islands that differed from M. d. gigantorhinus by a more extensive red colour on the breast.

Three black-eared barbet subspecies are recognized as valid taxa since 2014:

- P. d. duvaucelii – the nominate subspecies; Peninsular Malaysia, Sumatra, Borneo and Bangka Island
- P. d. gigantorhinus – Nias Island, off western Sumatra
- P. d. tanamassae – Batu Islands, off western Sumatra
