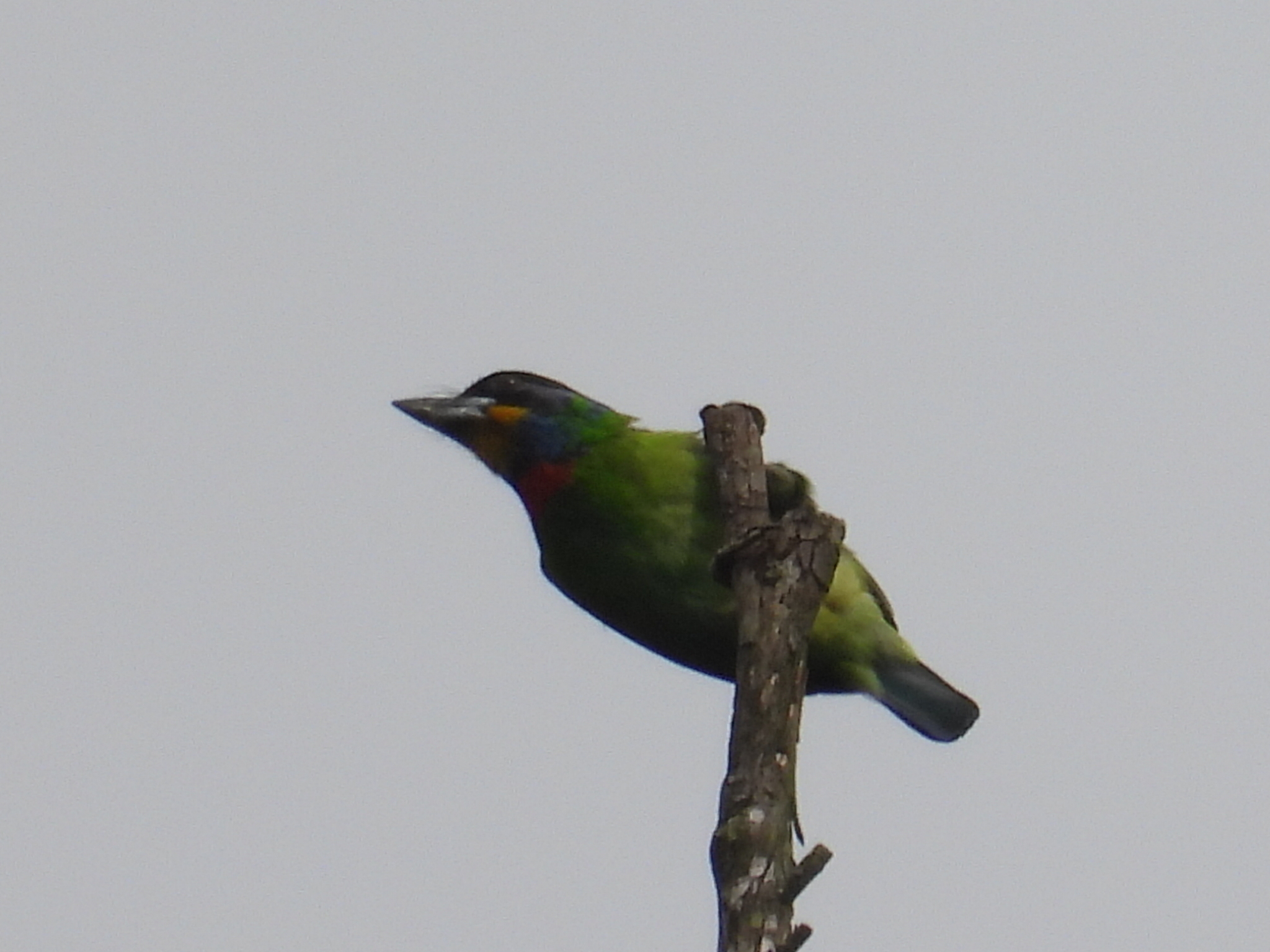

Conservation status
- Least Concern (IUCN 3.1)

Scientific classification
- Kingdom: Animalia
- Phylum: Chordata
- Class: Aves
- Order: Piciformes
- Family: Megalaimidae
- Genus: Psilopogon
- Species: P. faber

Binomial name
- Psilopogon faber (R. Swinhoe, 1870)

Synonyms
- Megalaima faber

= Chinese barbet =

Species of bird

The Chinese barbet (Psilopogon faber) is a bird in the family Megalaimidae. The species was first described by Robert Swinhoe in 1870. It is endemic to southern China.

Its natural habitats are subtropical or tropical moist lowland forests and subtropical or tropical moist montane forests. It is threatened by habitat loss. It was formerly considered a subspecies of the black-browed barbet (Psilopogon oorti).
