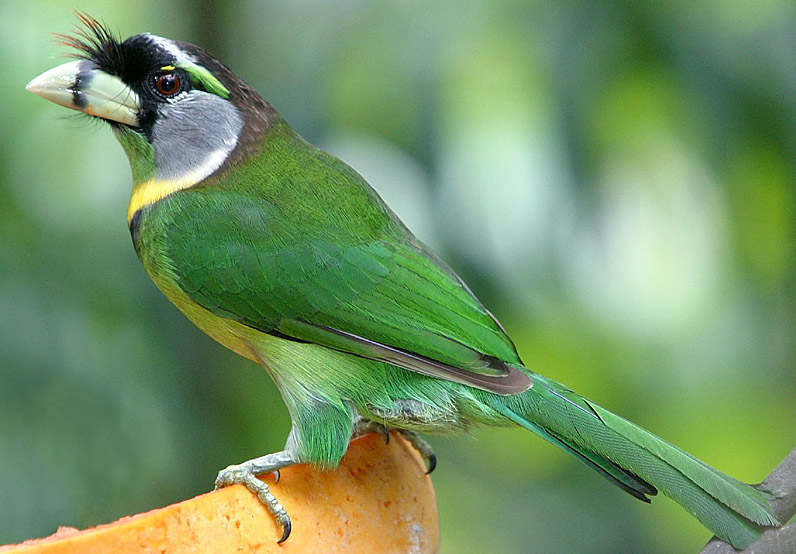
- Fire-tufted barbet (Psilopogon pyrolophus)

Scientific classification
- Kingdom: Animalia
- Phylum: Chordata
- Class: Aves
- Order: Piciformes
- Family: Megalaimidae
- Genus: Psilopogon; Müller, S., 1836

Type species
- Psilopogon pyrolophus Müller, S.

Synonyms
- Megalaima G. R. Gray, 1842

= Psilopogon =

Genus of birds

Psilopogon is a genus of Old World barbets that used to include only a single species, the fire-tufted barbet (P. pyrolophus). Results of molecular phylogenetic analyses indicate that the genus is nested within an evolutionary branch consisting of Asian barbets that were formerly placed in the genus Megalaima proposed by George Robert Gray in 1841. Since Psilopogon was proposed by Salomon Müller already in 1835, this name takes priority.

The name Psilopogon combines the Ancient Greek psilos meaning "bare" and pōgōn meaning "beard".

== Taxonomy ==
The genus Psilopogon was introduced in 1836 by the German naturalist Salomon Müller to accommodate a single species, the fire-tufted barbet (Psilopogon pyrolophus), which is therefore the type species.

In the 19th and 20th centuries, about 19 generic names were proposed for Asian barbet species in collections of natural history museums, including Megalaima by George Robert Gray in 1849 and Mezobucco by George Ernest Shelley in 1889. Molecular phylogenetic research of Asian barbets revealed that the Megalaima species form a clade, which also includes the fire-tufted barbet. Barbets formerly placed in Megalaima were therefore reclassified under the genus Psilopogon, which now contains the following 33 species:

As of February 2023, the list of birds maintained by Frank Gill, Pamela Rasmussen and David Donsker on behalf of the International Ornithological Committee (IOC) as well as the Clements Checklist of Birds of the World maintained by members of Cornell University both treat Psilopogon cyanotis as a subspecies of Psilopogon duvaucellii. The taxon Psilopogon cyanotis was not included in the 2013 molecular phylogenetic study by Robert Jan den Tex and Jennifer Leonard.

Genus Psilopogon – Müller, S., 1836 – thirty three species
Common name	Scientific name and subspecies	Range	Size and ecology	IUCN status and estimated population
Fire-tufted barbet	Psilopogon pyrolophus S. Müller, 1836	Peninsular Malaysia and Sumatra	Size: Habitat: Diet:	LC
Coppersmith barbet	Psilopogon haemacephalus (Statius Müller, 1776) Nine subspecies: P. h. haemacephalus; P. h. indicus; P. h. roseus; P. h. intermedia; P. h. delicus; P. h. mindanensis; P. h. celestinoi; P. h. cebuensis; P. h. homochroa	Pakistan to the Philippines and Indonesia	Size: Habitat: Diet:	LC
White-cheeked barbet	Psilopogon viridis (Boddaert, 1783)	Western Ghats and adjoining hills	Size: Habitat: Diet:	LC
Great barbet	Psilopogon virens (Boddaert, 1783) Four subspecies: P. v. virens; P. v. marshallorum; P. v. magnificus; P. v. clamator	northern India, Nepal and Bhutan, Bangladesh and some parts of Southeast Asia, as far east as Laos	Size: Habitat: Diet:	LC
Brown-headed barbet	Psilopogon zeylanicus (Gmelin, 1788) Three subspecies: P. z. inornatus (Walden, 1870); P. z. caniceps (Franklin, 1831); P. z. zeylanicus (Gmelin, JF, 1788)	Western Ghats and hilly parts of southern peninsular India	Size: Habitat: Diet:	LC
Crimson-fronted barbet	Psilopogon rubricapillus Gmelin, 1788	Sri Lanka	Size: Habitat: Diet:	LC
Blue-throated barbet	Psilopogon asiaticus (Latham, 1790)	Indian subcontinent and Southeast Asia	Size: Habitat: Diet:	LC
Lineated barbet	Psilopogon lineatus (Vieillot, 1816)	West Bengal and Bangladesh	Size: Habitat: Diet:	LC
Yellow-fronted barbet	Psilopogon flavifrons (Cuvier, 1816)	Sri Lanka	Size: Habitat: Diet:	LC
Black-banded barbet	Psilopogon javensis (Horsfield, 1821)	Java and Bali	Size: Habitat: Diet:	LC
Yellow-eared barbet	Psilopogon australis (Horsfield, 1821)	Java and Bali	Size: Habitat: Diet:	LC
Flame-fronted barbet	Psilopogon armillaris (Temminck, 1821)	Java and Bali	Size: Habitat: Diet:	LC
Golden-whiskered barbet	Psilopogon chrysopogon (Temminck, 1824) Three subspecies: P. c. chrysopogon; P. c. chrysopsis; P. c. laetus	Brunei, Indonesia, Malaysia, Thailand, Borneo and Sumatra	Size: Habitat: Diet:	LC
Red-throated barbet	Psilopogon mystacophanos (Temminck, 1824)	Myanmar, Thailand, Malaysia, Singapore, Indonesia, Brunei	Size: Habitat: Diet:	NT
Black-eared barbet	Psilopogon duvaucelii (Lesson, 1830) Three subspecies: P. d. duvaucelii; P. d. gigantorhinus; P. d. tanamassae	Peninsular Malaysia, Sumatra and Borneo	Size: Habitat: Diet:	LC
Green-eared barbet	Psilopogon faiostrictus (Temminck, 1831)	southern China, Cambodia, Laos, Thailand and Vietnam	Size: Habitat: Diet:	LC
Brown-throated barbet	Psilopogon corvinus (Temminck, 1831)	western Java	Size: Habitat: Diet:	LC
Yellow-crowned barbet	Psilopogon henricii (Temminck, 1831)	Brunei, Indonesia, Malaysia, Singapore, and Thailand	Size: Habitat: Diet:	NT
Black-browed barbet	Psilopogon oorti (Müller, 1836)	Sumatra and the Malay Peninsula	Size: Habitat: Diet:	LC
Red-crowned barbet	Psilopogon rafflesii (Lesson, 1839)	Brunei, Indonesia, Malaysia, Myanmar, Singapore, and Thailand	Size: Habitat: Diet:	NT
Golden-throated barbet	Psilopogon franklinii (Edward Blyth, 1842) Two subspecies: P. f. franklinii; P. f. ramsayi	Nepal, India, Bhutan, Myanmar, Thailand, Malaysia, Laos, Vietnam and mainland China	Size: Habitat: Diet:	LC
Blue-eared barbet	Psilopogon cyanotis (Blyth, 1847) Three subspecies: P. c. cyanotis; P. c. orientalis; P. c. stuarti (Robinson & Kloss, 1919)	northeast India ‍and Bangladesh to peninsular Thailand	Size: Habitat: Diet:	LC
Malabar barbet	Psilopogon malabaricus (Blyth, 1847)	Western Ghats from around Goa south to southern Kerala	Size: Habitat: Diet:	LC
Taiwan barbet	Psilopogon nuchalis (Gould, 1863)	Taiwan	Size: Habitat: Diet:	LC
Red-vented barbet	Psilopogon lagrandieri (Verreaux, 1868)	Cambodia, Laos and Vietnam	Size: Habitat: Diet:	LC
Chinese barbet	Psilopogon faber (R. Swinhoe, 1870)	southern China	Size: Habitat: Diet:	LC
Moustached barbet	Psilopogon incognitus (Hume, 1874)	Myanmar, Thailand, Cambodia, Laos and Vietnam	Size: Habitat: Diet:	LC
Golden-naped barbet	Psilopogon pulcherrimus (Sharpe, 1888)	Indonesia and Malaysia	Size: Habitat: Diet:	LC
Mountain barbet	Psilopogon monticola (Sharpe, 1889)	Borneo	Size: Habitat: Diet:	LC
Bornean barbet	Psilopogon eximius (Sharpe, 1892)	Indonesia and Malaysia, Borneo	Size: Habitat: Diet:	LC
Necklaced barbet	Psilopogon auricularis (Robinson & Kloss, 1919)	southern Laos and Vietnam	Size: Habitat: Diet:	LC
Indochinese barbet	Psilopogon annamensis (Robinson & Kloss, 1919)	Laos, Vietnam and Cambodia	Size: Habitat: Diet:	LC
Turquoise-throated barbet	Psilopogon chersonesus (Chasen & Kloss, 1927)	Thailand	Size: Habitat: Diet:	LC

=== Phylogeny ===
- - - - Coppersmith barbet
    - - Crimson-fronted barbet
      - Malabar barbet
  - - - - Yellow-eared barbet
        - Black-eared barbet
      - Bornean barbet
    - - - - Great barbet
          - Red-vented barbet
        - Fire-tufted barbet
      - - - - - Red-throated barbet
              - Black-banded barbet
            - Red-crowned barbet
          - - - - Flame-fronted barbet
                - Yellow-crowned barbet
              - Golden-naped barbet
            - - Green-eared barbet
              - - - Lineated barbet
                  - - Brown-headed barbet
                    - - White-cheeked barbet
                      - Yellow-fronted barbet
                - - - Golden-throated barbet
                    - Necklaced barbet
                  - - - - Brown-throated barbet
                        - - Golden-whiskered barbet
                          - Golden-whiskered barbet
                      - Mountain barbet
                    - - - Taiwan barbet
                        - Chinese barbet
                      - Moustached barbet
                    - - - Blue-throated barbet
                        - Indochinese barbet
                      - - Turquoise-throated barbet
                        - Black-browed barbet

Relationship within the genus
