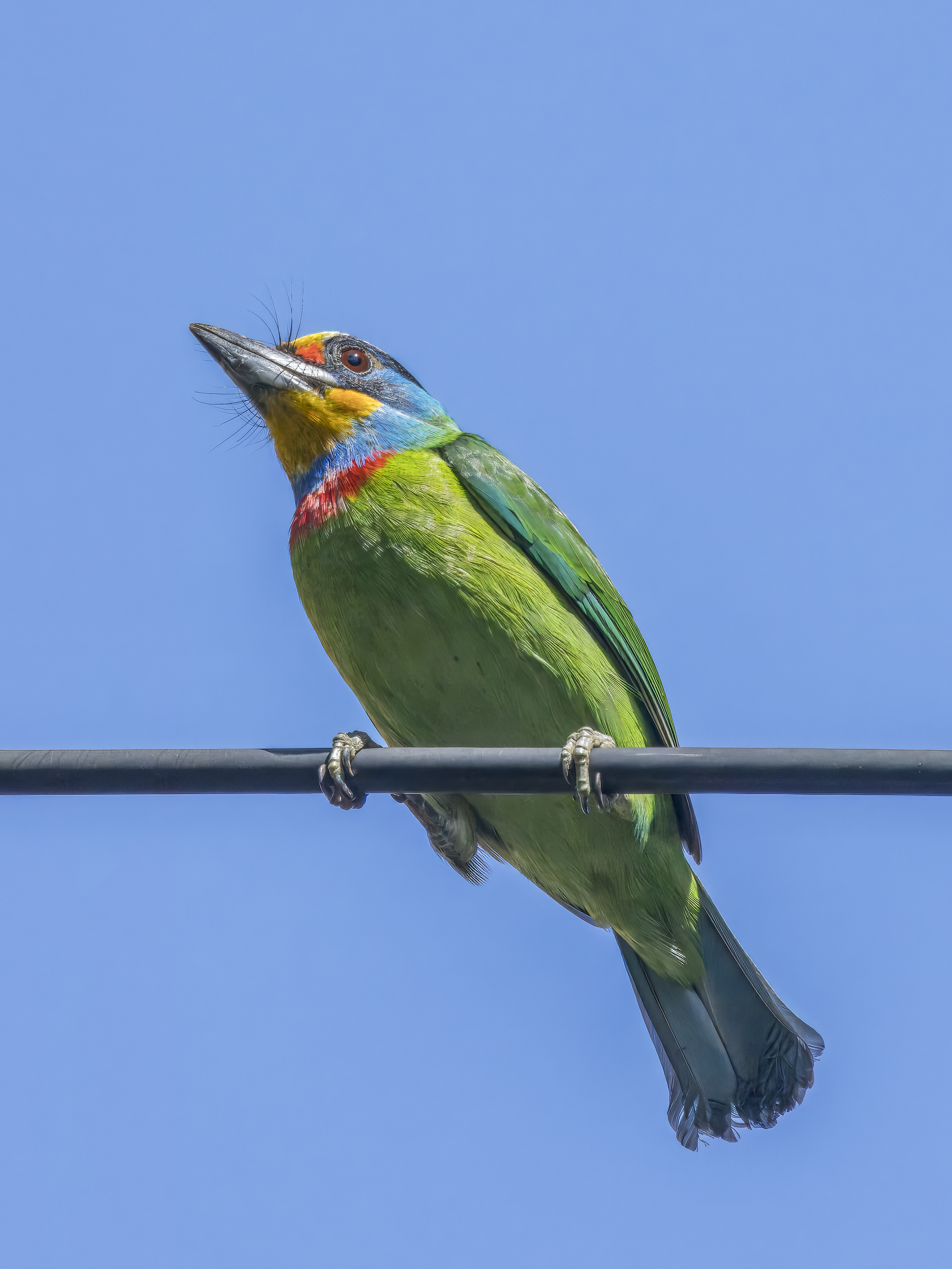

Conservation status
- Least Concern (IUCN 3.1)

Scientific classification
- Kingdom: Animalia
- Phylum: Chordata
- Class: Aves
- Order: Piciformes
- Family: Megalaimidae
- Genus: Psilopogon
- Species: P. nuchalis

Binomial name
- Psilopogon nuchalis (Gould, 1863)

Synonyms
- Megalaima nuchalis Gould, 1863

= Taiwan barbet =

Species of bird

Psilopogon nuchalis singing

The Taiwan barbet (Psilopogon nuchalis), also known as the embroidered barbet, is a species of bird endemic to Taiwan.

== Taxonomy ==
It was formerly considered a subspecies of the black-browed barbet (Psilopogon oorti) and placed in the genus Megalaima.

== Description ==
It is about 20 cm (7.9 in) long. The plumage is mostly green. The lore has a red spot. The ear-coverts and lower malar are blue. The throat is mustard yellow. The forehead is yellow. There is a black stripe above the eye. The beak is black and thick. The breast has a blue band and a red band. The belly is yellowish-green. The feet are greyish. The sexes are alike.

== Name ==
In Taiwan, the bird is known as the "five-colored bird" (Chinese: 五色鳥; pinyin: Wǔsèniǎo), referring to the five colors on its plumage. Because of its colorful plumage and that its call resembles that of a percussion instrument known as a wooden fish, the species is also referred to as the "colorful monk" (Chinese: 花和尚; pinyin: Huā Héshàng; Taiwanese Hokkien: hue-á huê-siūnn) by Taiwanese.

== Habitat and ecology ==
It is commonly found in forests at elevations of up to 2,800 m (9,200 ft). It feeds on fruits and insects. The breeding season is from March to August. It nests in tree cavities. It may use an existing cavity or excavate one.

== See also ==
- List of endemic species of Taiwan
