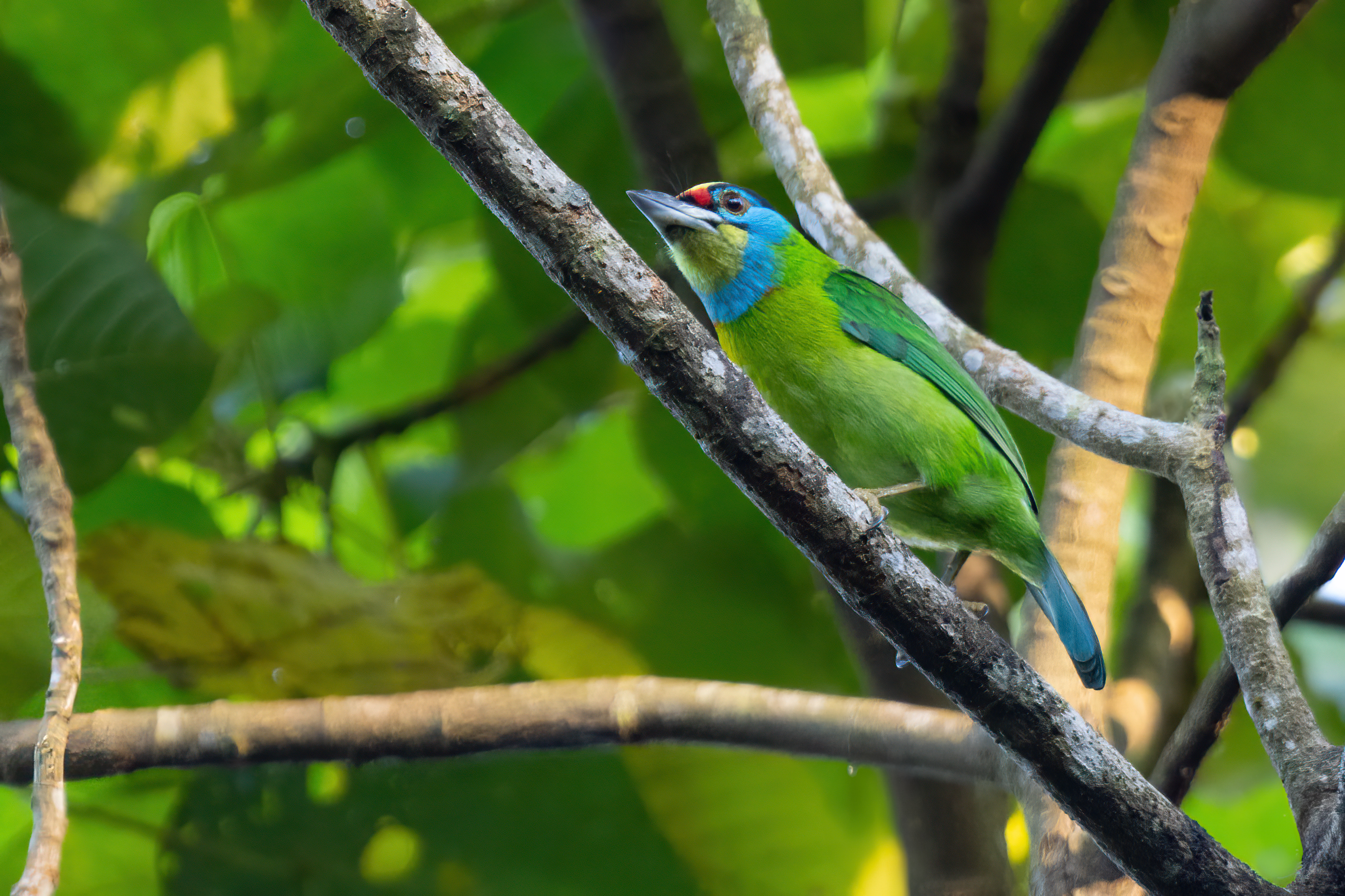

Conservation status
- Least Concern (IUCN 3.1)

Scientific classification
- Kingdom: Animalia
- Phylum: Chordata
- Class: Aves
- Order: Piciformes
- Family: Megalaimidae
- Genus: Psilopogon
- Species: P. annamensis

Binomial name
- Psilopogon annamensis (Robinson & Kloss, 1919)

= Indochinese barbet =

Species of bird

The Indochinese barbet (Psilopogon annamensis), also called Annam barbet, is a bird belonging to the family Megalaimidae. It inhabits tropical and subtropical forests. It is found in Laos, Vietnam and Cambodia. It used to be considered a subspecies of the black-browed barbet.
