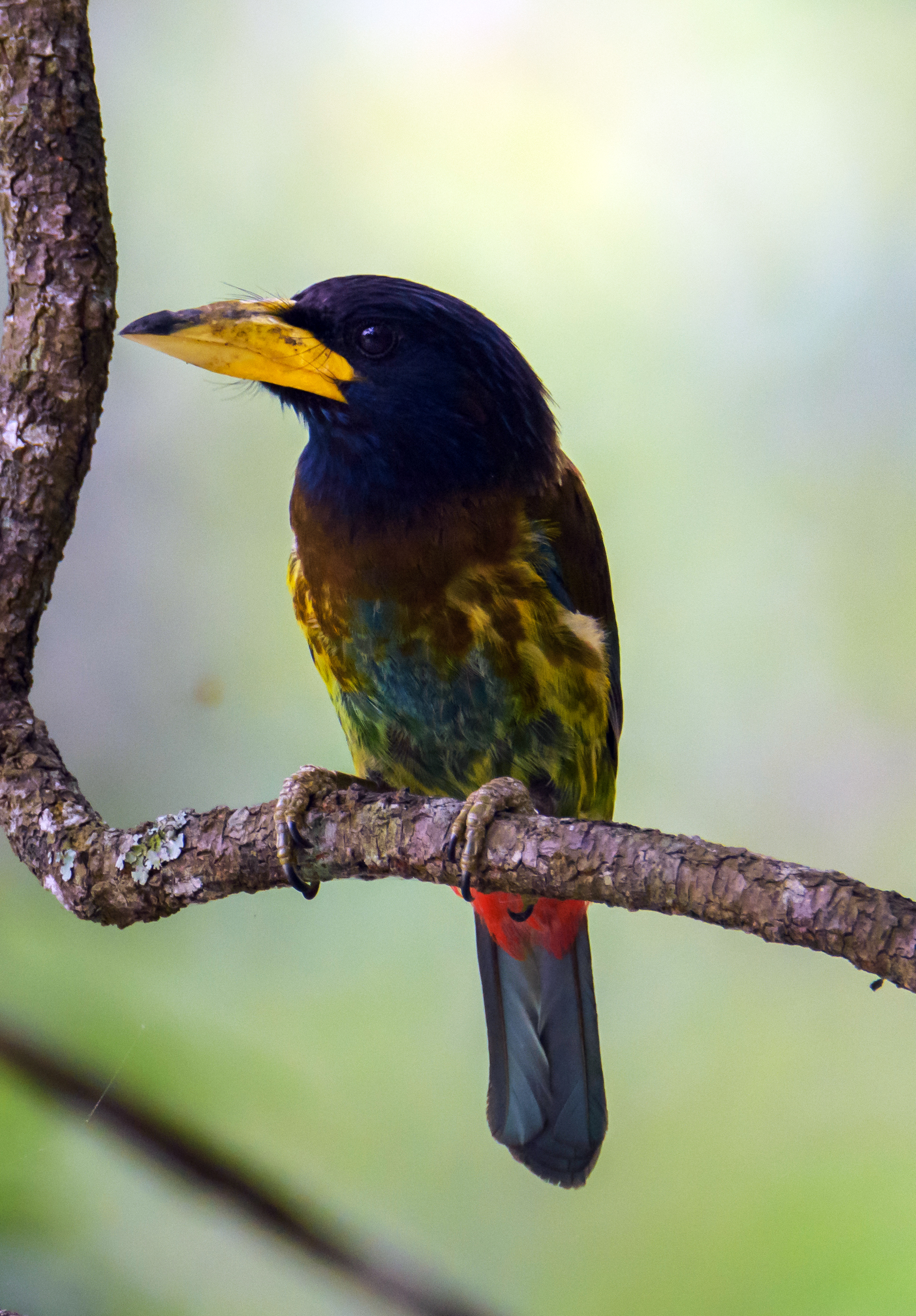
- Great barbet in Godawari, Lalitpur

Conservation status
- Least Concern (IUCN 3.1)

Scientific classification
- Kingdom: Animalia
- Phylum: Chordata
- Class: Aves
- Order: Piciformes
- Family: Megalaimidae
- Genus: Psilopogon
- Species: P. virens

Binomial name
- Psilopogon virens (Boddaert, 1783)

Audio

= Great barbet =

Species of bird

The great barbet (Psilopogon virens) is an Asian barbet native to the Indian sub-continent and Southeast Asia, where it inhabits forests up to 3,000 m (9,800 ft) altitude. It has been listed as Least Concern on the IUCN Red List since 2004 because of its wide distribution.

== Taxonomy ==
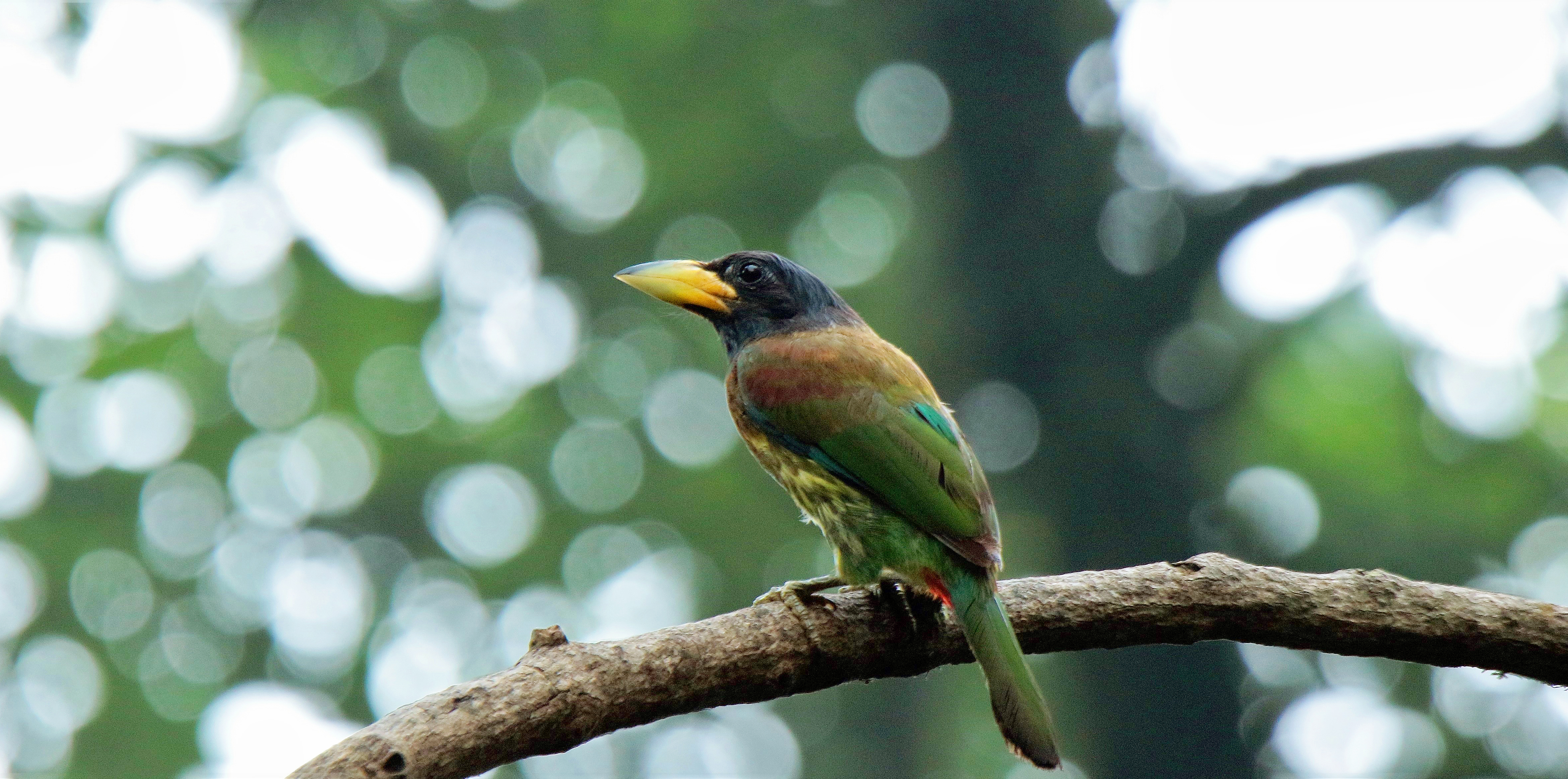
Great barbet in Ba Bể National Park

Bucco virens was the scientific name proposed by Pieter Boddaert in 1783 for a great barbet that had been described by Georges-Louis Leclerc, Comte de Buffon in 1781 based on a specimen collected in China. It was illustrated in a hand-coloured plate engraved by François-Nicolas Martinet.

It was placed in the genus Megalaima proposed by George Robert Gray in 1842 who suggested to use this name instead of Bucco. In the 19th and 20th centuries, the following great barbet zoological specimens were described:

- Megalaema marshallorum proposed by Robert Swinhoe in 1870 was based on a great barbet from the Himalayas.
- Megalaima virens magnifica proposed by E. C. Stuart Baker in 1926 was a male barbet from Machi, Manipur.
- Megalaima virens clamator proposed by Ernst Mayr in 1941 was a bird collected in northern Myanmar.

Molecular phylogenetic research of barbets revealed that the birds in the genus Megalaima form a clade, which also includes the fire-tufted barbet, the only species placed in the genus Psilopogon at the time. Barbets formerly placed in this genus were therefore reclassified under the oldest genus name of Psilopogon.

Four great barbet subspecies are recognised as of 2014:

- P. v. virens occurs from central Myanmar, Thailand to Vietnam and China
- P. v. marshallorum occurs from northeastern Pakistan to western Nepal
- P. v. magnificus occurs from eastern Nepal to Assam
- P. v. clamator occurs from Assam and northern Myanmar to northern Thailand and Yunnan in China

Results of a phylogenetic study of Asian barbets indicate that the great barbet is most closely related to the red-vented barbet (P. lagrandieri) occurring in Cambodia, Laos and Vietnam.

== Description ==
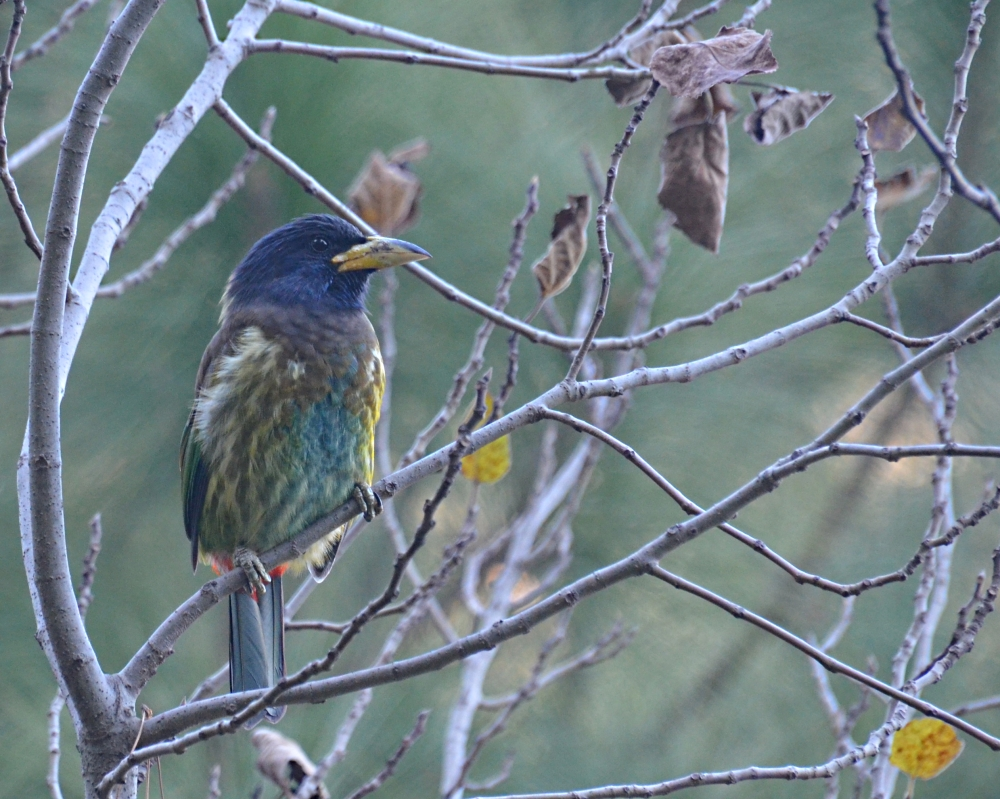
Great barbet in Himachal Pradesh

The great barbet has a blue head, large yellow bill, brown and green-streaked body, belly and a red vent. The plumage is green. It is the largest barbet species with a body length of 32–35 cm (13–14 in) and a weight of 192–295 g (6.8–10.4 oz).

== Distribution and habitat ==
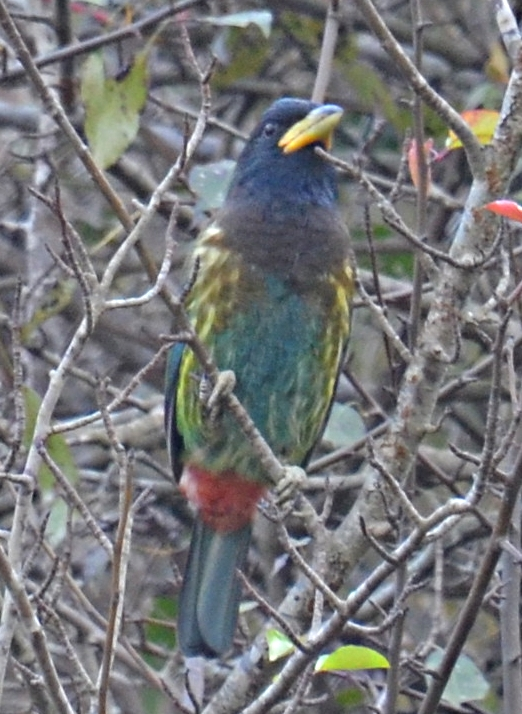
Great barbet in Himachal Pradesh

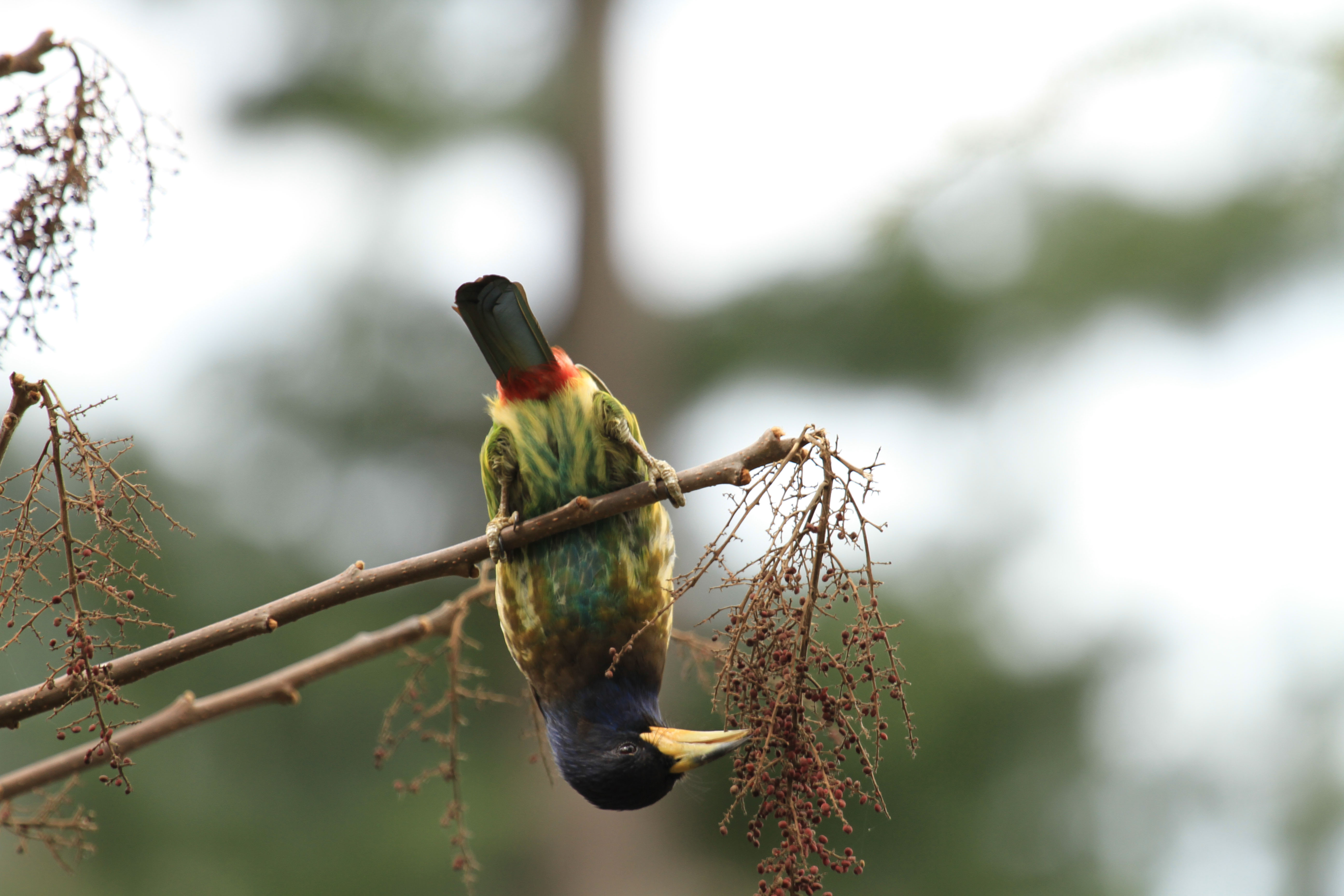
Great barbet at Sarahan

The great barbet is a resident breeder in the lower-to-middle altitudes of the Himalayas, ranging across northern Pakistan, India, Nepal and Bhutan, Bangladesh and some parts of Southeast Asia, as far away as Laos.

== Behaviour and ecology ==
Great barbet in Kaeng Krachan National Park

The great barbet's nesting season is from April to July. It typically builds nests in tree holes. Both male and females take care of the young. Its diet consists mainly of fruits and insects. The male's territorial call is a very loud kay-oh. The alarm is a harsh keeab, and another call is a repetitive piou-piou-piou-piou.
