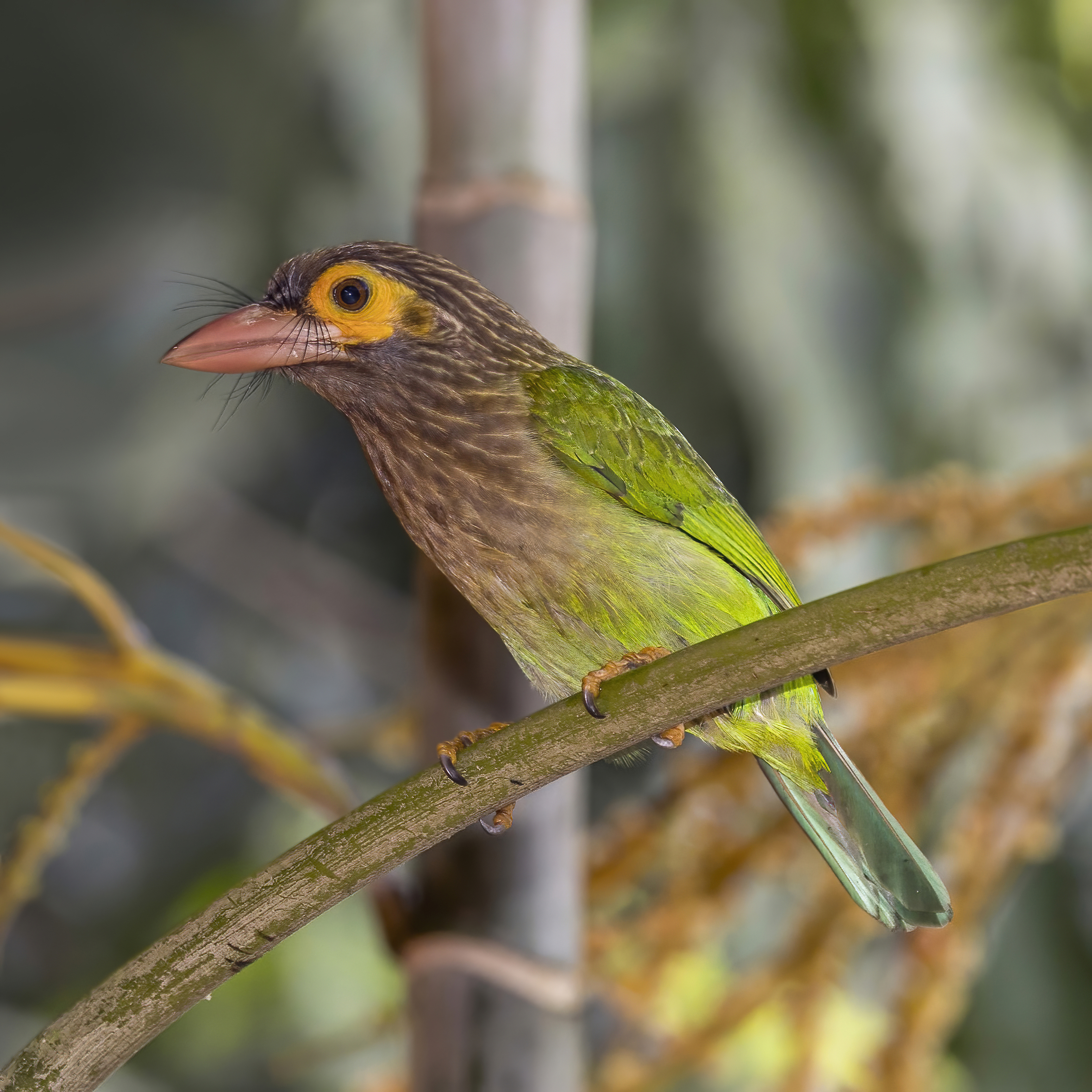
- P. z. zeylanicus, Sri Lanka

Conservation status
- Least Concern (IUCN 3.1)

Scientific classification
- Kingdom: Animalia
- Phylum: Chordata
- Class: Aves
- Order: Piciformes
- Family: Megalaimidae
- Genus: Psilopogon
- Species: P. zeylanicus

Binomial name
- Psilopogon zeylanicus (Gmelin, JF, 1788)

Synonyms
- Megalaima zeylanica

Audio
- Calls recorded in Bharatpur, India

= Brown-headed barbet =

Species of barbet found in the Indian subcontinent

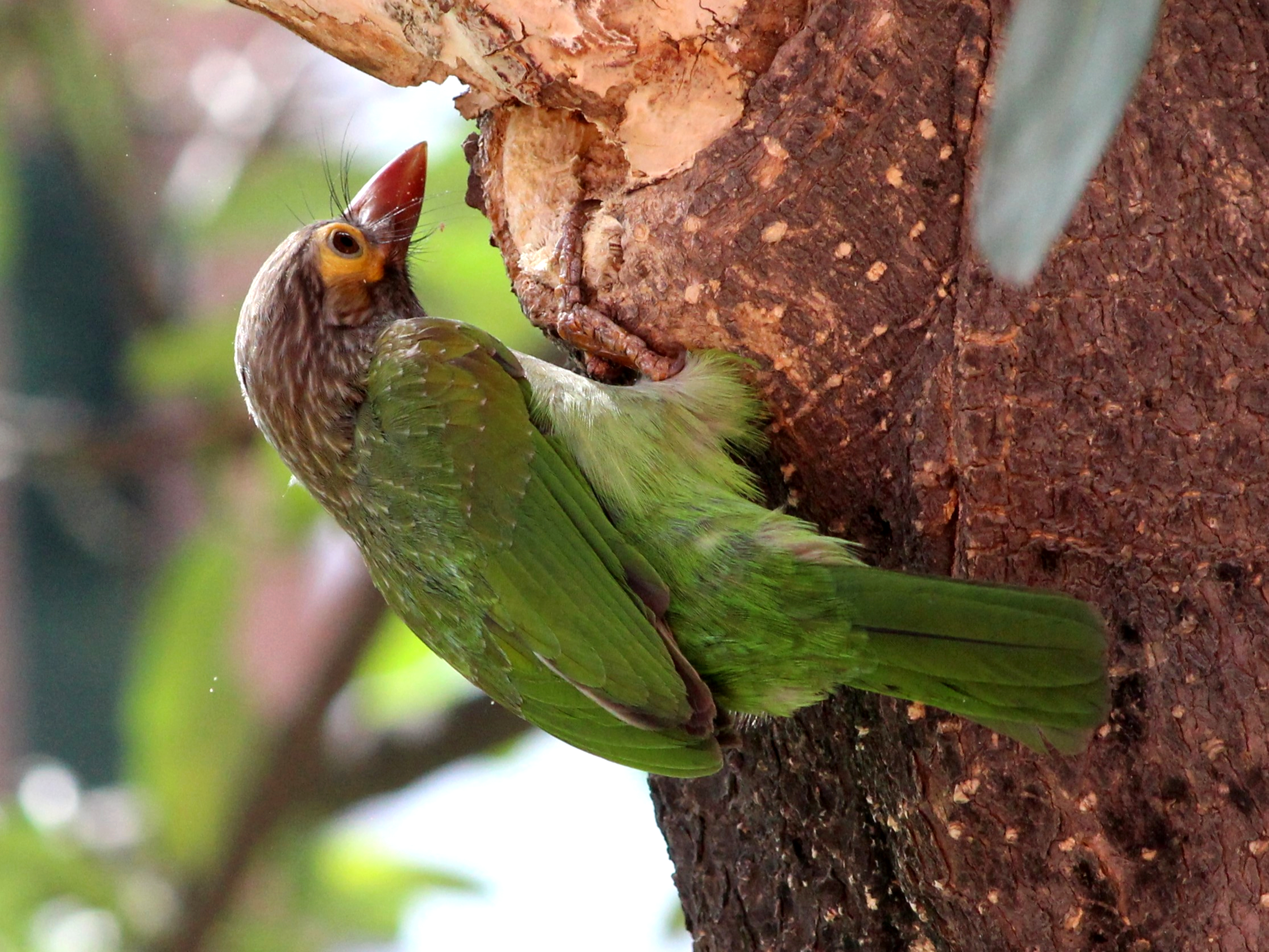
Brown-headed barbet in Chandigarh

The brown-headed barbet (Psilopogon zeylanicus) is an Asian barbet species native to the Indian subcontinent, where it inhabits tropical and subtropical moist broadleaf forests.

== Taxonomy ==
The brown-headed barbet was formally described in 1788 by the German naturalist Johann Friedrich Gmelin in his revised and expanded edition of Carl Linnaeus's Systema Naturae. He placed it with the puffbirds in the genus Bucco and coined the binomial name Bucco zeylanicus. Gmelin based his description on the "yellow cheeked barbet" that had been described and illustrated in 1776 by the naturalist Peter Brown from a specimen collected in Sri Lanka. The brown-headed barbet is now one of 32 barbets placed in the genus Psilopogon that was introduced in 1836 by Salomon Müller.

Three subspecies are recognised:

- Psilopogon zeylanicus inornatus (Walden, 1870) – west India
- Psilopogon zeylanicus caniceps (Franklin, 1831) – Nepal to central India
- Psilopogon zeylanicus zeylanicus (Gmelin, JF, 1788) – south India and Sri Lanka

== Description ==
The adult has a streaked brown head, neck and breast, and a yellow eye patch. The rest of the plumage is green. It is 27 cm (11 in) long with a large head, short neck and short tail.

Its call is a repetitive kutroo…kutroo…kutroo, but silent in the winter. Others take up the call when one starts.

== Distribution and habitat ==
It is widespread, with its range stretching from the Terai in southern Nepal in the north to Sri Lanka in the south, encompassing most of peninsular India, and listed as Least Concern on the IUCN Red List.

== Behaviour and ecology ==
It is an arboreal species of gardens and wooded country which eats fruit and insects. It is fairly tolerant of humans and often seen in city parks. It nests in a tree hole, laying 2-4 eggs. It forages on mangoes, ripe jackfruit, papaya, banana, figs and similar cultivated fruit trees. Its habitat includes urban and country gardens; it tends to eschew heavy forest. It nests in a suitable hole in a tree that it will often excavate. Both sexes incubate the eggs and often communicate with each other using their Kura, kura calls.

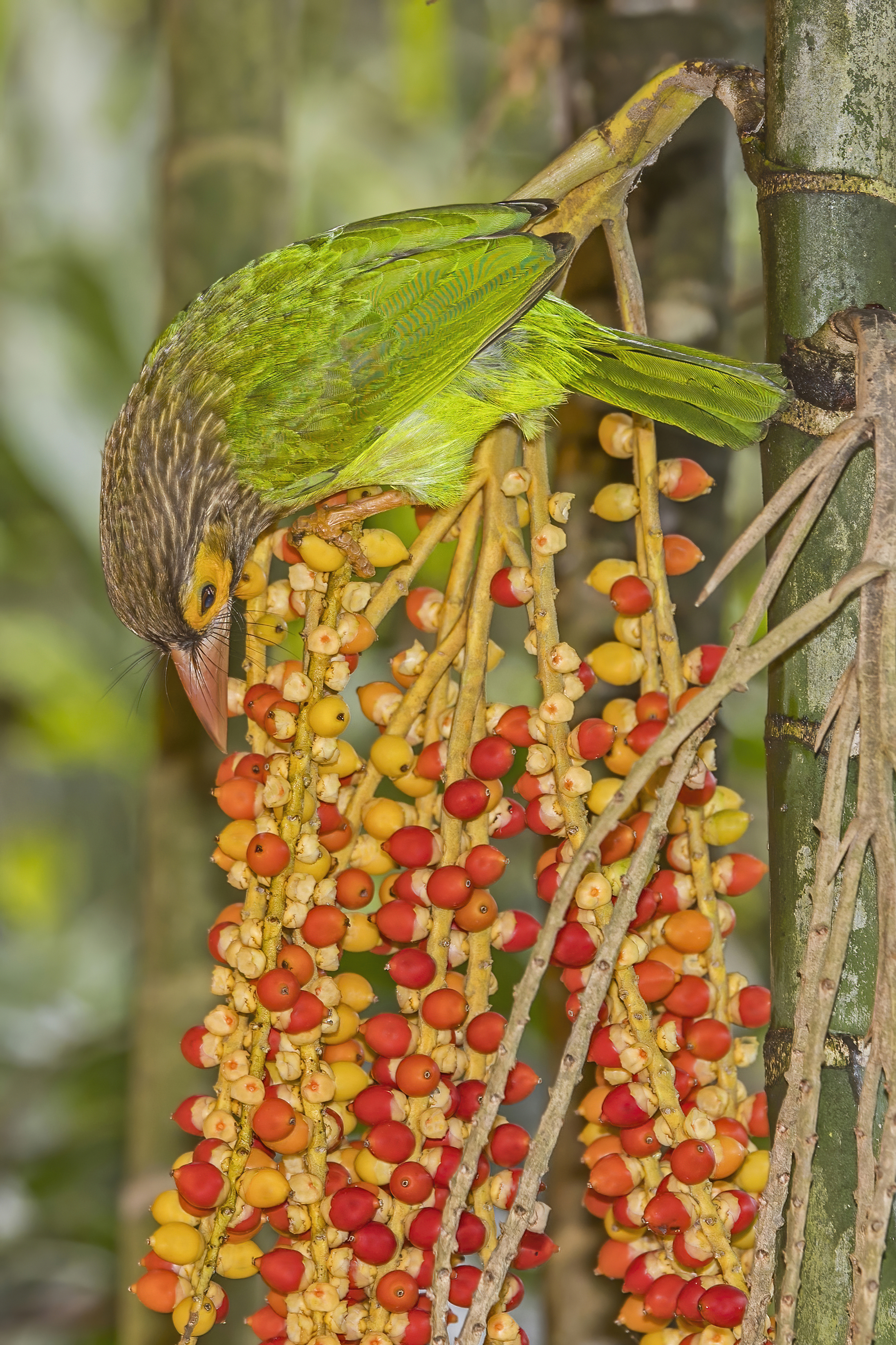
eating palm fruit
