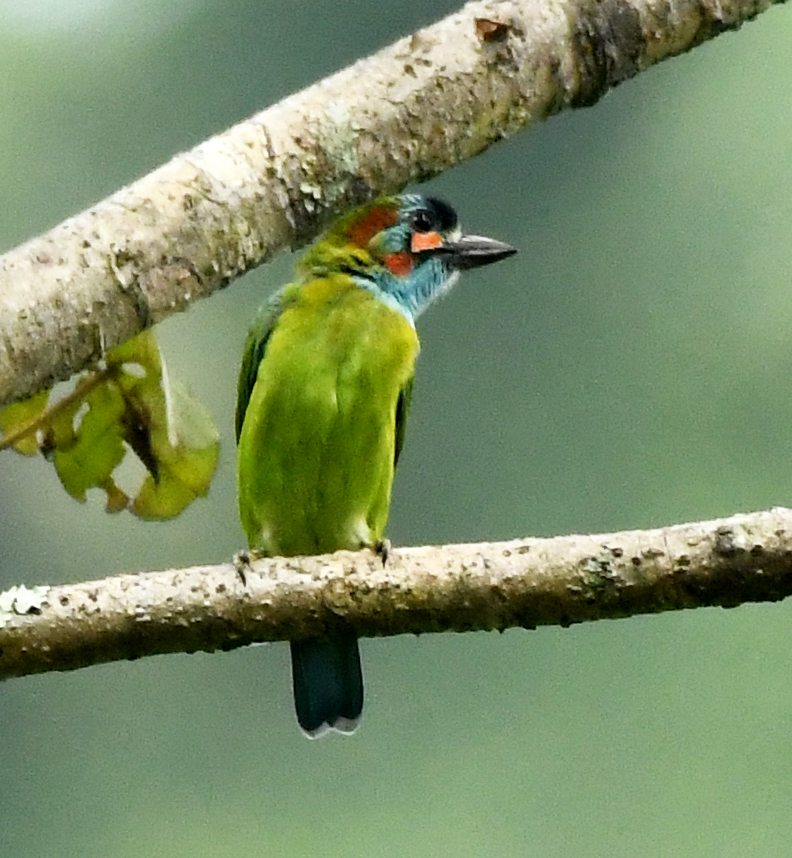

Conservation status
- Least Concern (IUCN 3.1)

Scientific classification
- Kingdom: Animalia
- Phylum: Chordata
- Class: Aves
- Order: Piciformes
- Family: Megalaimidae
- Genus: Psilopogon
- Species: P. cyanotis

Binomial name
- Psilopogon cyanotis (Blyth, 1847)

Synonyms
- Megalaima cyanotis

= Blue-eared barbet =

Species of bird

The blue-eared barbet (Psilopogon cyanotis) is a barbet in the Megalaimidae family native to mainland Southeast Asia. Because of its wide distribution and stable population it is listed as Least Concern on the IUCN Red List.

== Description ==
The blue-eared barbet has green plumage and crimson-coloured spots on the cheeks. Its throat and ear-coverts are verditer-blue. A black band runs between throat and breast. It is 16–17 cm (6.3–6.7 in) long. It is a plump bird, with a short neck, large head and short tail. The bill is dark. The adult male has a black forehead. The female has a duller head pattern with a more orange tint to the patches above and below the ear coverts, and the juvenile has a green head with some blue on the ear coverts and throat.

The male's territorial call is a repeated loud ko-turr. Other calls include a whistle known as the "policeman whistle".

== Distribution and habitat ==
The blue-eared barbet is a resident breeder in the hills from eastern Nepal through northeast India to southern Thailand and Indochina. It inhabits shrublands and forests up to an altitude of 1,600 m (5,200 ft). It nests in tree cavities.

== Taxonomy ==
Bucco cyanotis was the scientific name proposed by Edward Blyth in 1847 who described a barbet from the Arakan area. In the 19th and 20th centuries, about 19 generic names were proposed for Asian barbet species, including Psilopogon by Salomon Müller in 1836, Megalaima by George Robert Gray in 1849 and Mezobucco by George Ernest Shelley in 1889. Taxonomists used different generic names when describing barbets in collections of natural history museums.

Mesobucco duvaugli orientalis was proposed by Herbert C. Robinson in 1915 for seven barbets collected on the coast at the Thailand-Cambodian border and on Ko Chang Island that differed from cyanotis barbets; they were larger and paler, and the red spot below their eyes was intermixed with golden.

Three blue-eared barbet subspecies are recognized as valid taxa since 2014:

- P. c. cyanotis – from southeastern Nepal, Bangladesh and northeastern India to Myanmar, northern Thailand and southern China
- P. c. orientalis – from eastern Thailand to Cambodia, Laos and Vietnam
- P. c. stuarti (Robinson & Kloss, 1919) – peninsular Thailand
