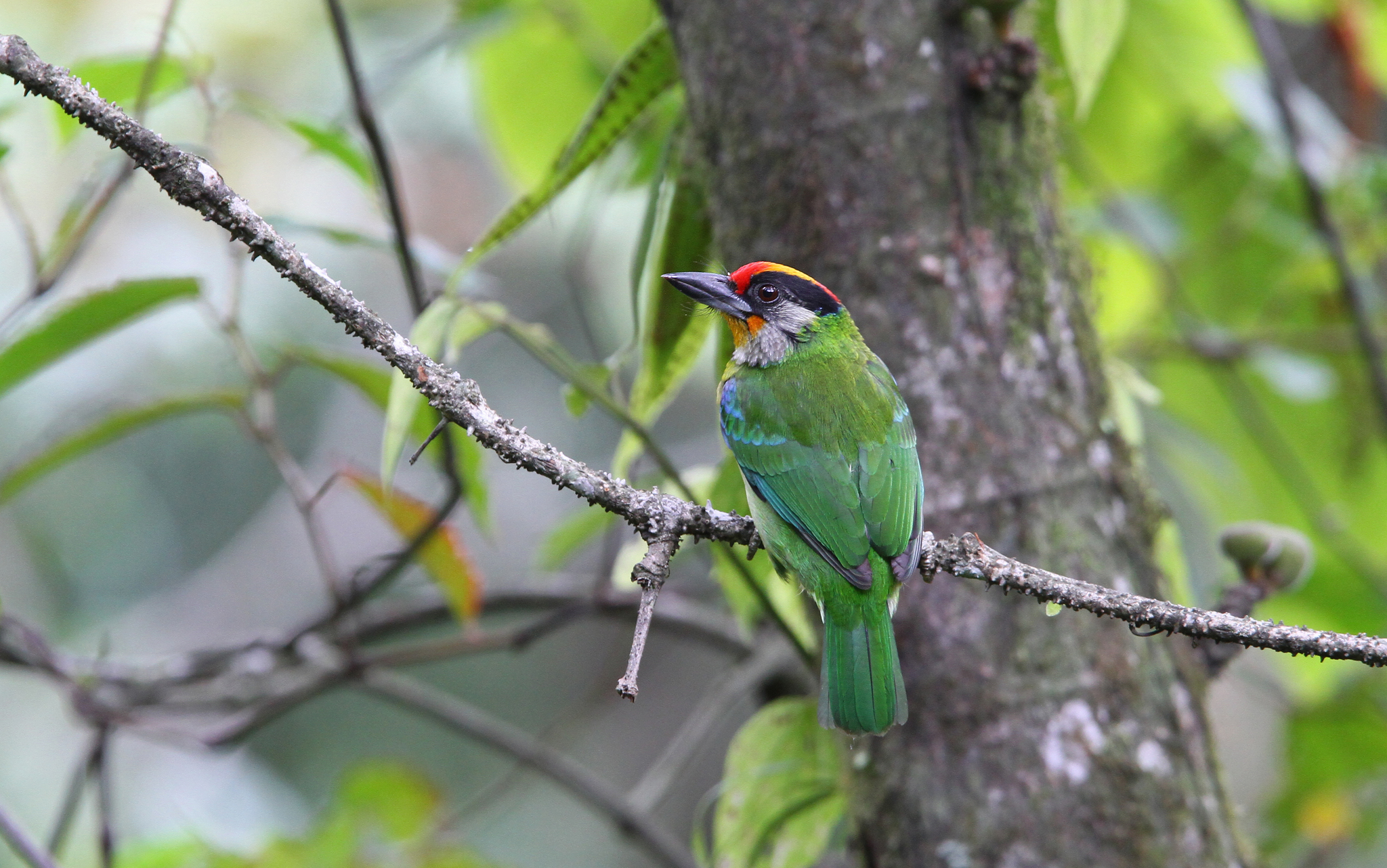
- Golden-throated barbet in Lower Dibang Valley, India

Conservation status
- Least Concern (IUCN 3.1)

Scientific classification
- Kingdom: Animalia
- Phylum: Chordata
- Class: Aves
- Order: Piciformes
- Family: Megalaimidae
- Genus: Psilopogon
- Species: P. franklinii

Binomial name
- Psilopogon franklinii (Blyth, 1842)

Synonyms
- Cyanops ramsayi Megalaima franklinii

= Golden-throated barbet =

Species of bird

The golden-throated barbet (Psilopogon franklinii) is an Asian barbet native to Southeast Asia, where it inhabits foremost forests between 900 and 2,700 m (3,000 and 8,900 ft) altitude. It is listed as Least Concern on the IUCN Red List because of its wide distribution and stable population.

== Taxonomy ==
Bucco franklinii was the scientific name proposed by Edward Blyth in 1842 who described a vivid green barbet with a golden throat collected in Darjeeling. It was placed in the genus Megalaima proposed by George Robert Gray in 1842 who suggested to use this name instead of Bucco. In the 19th and 20th centuries, the following golden-throated barbet zoological specimens were described:

- Megalaema ramsayi proposed by Arthur Viscount Walden in 1875 was a golden-throated barbet collected in the Karen Hills.
- Cyanops franklinii auricularis proposed by Herbert C. Robinson and C. Boden Kloss in 1919 for a barbet collected at the Langbian Plateau in southern Vietnam.
- Cyanops franklinii minor proposed by C. Boden Kloss and Frederick Nutter Chasen in 1926 for a specimen collected in Perak, Malaysia.
- Cyanops franklinii trangensis proposed by Joseph Harvey Riley in 1934 for a barbet collected in Thailand.

Molecular phylogenetic research of barbets revealed that the birds in the genus Megalaima form a clade, which also includes the fire-tufted barbet, the only species placed in the genus Psilopogon at the time. Barbets formerly placed in this genus were therefore reclassified under the genus Psilopogon. Two golden-throated barbet subspecies are recognised as of 2014:

- P. f. franklinii occurs in the Himalayan foothills from central Nepal to northern Myanmar, Laos and southwestern China.
- P. f. ramsayi occurs from central and eastern Myanmar to the Malay Peninsula.

== Description ==
The golden-throated barbet is vivid green above with paler yellowish-green plumage below, deep blue wings and verditer underneath the tail. Its bill is dusky black, and it is black around the eyes. Its forehead is crimson and its throat orange. Its legs are greenish. It is 20.5–23.5 cm (8.1–9.3 in) long and weighs 50–101 g (1.8–3.6 oz).

== Distribution and habitat ==
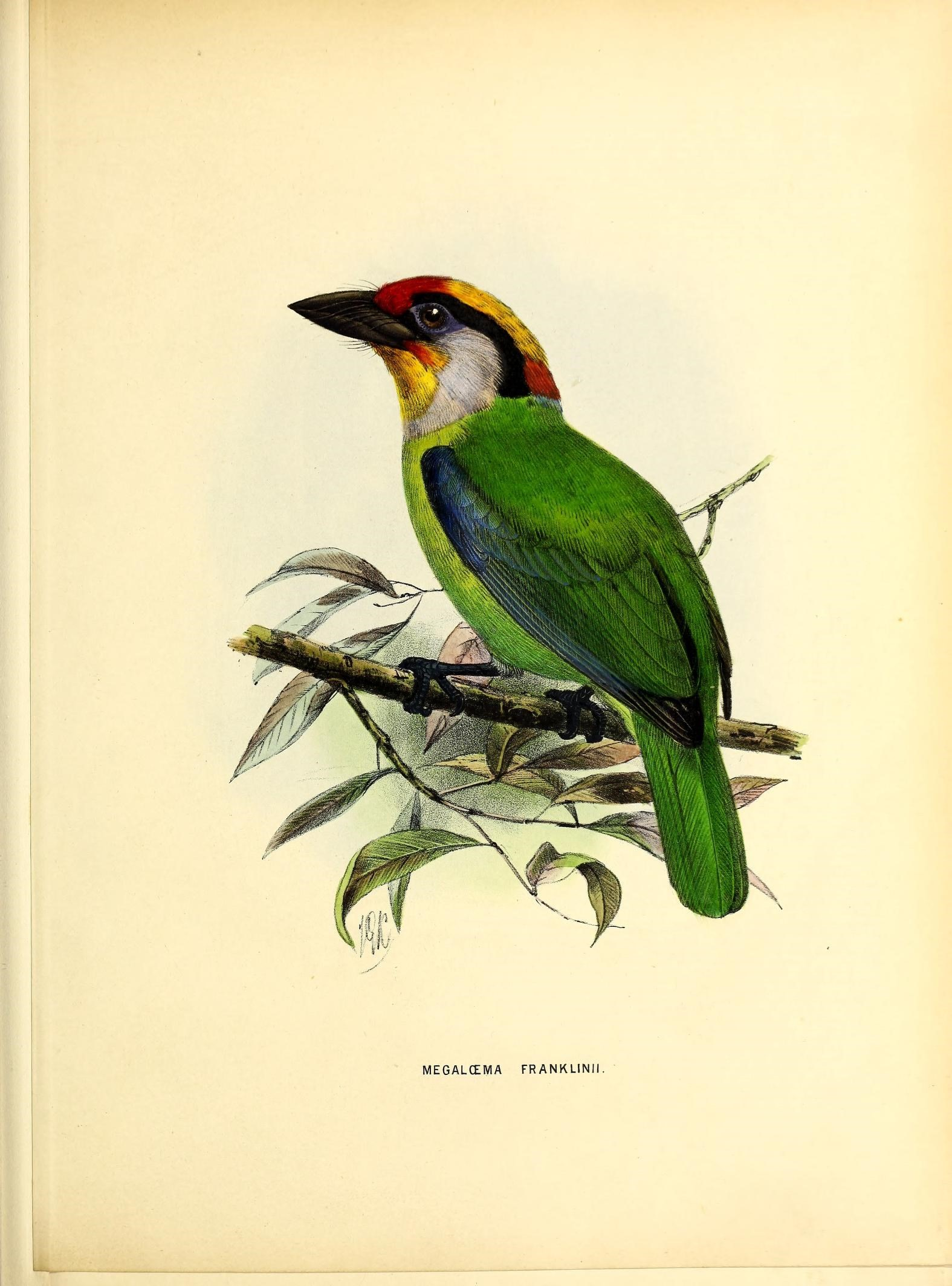
Illustration by John Gerrard Keulemans.

Fraser's Hill, Malaysia 1997

The golden-throated barbet is resident in Nepal, India, Bhutan, Myanmar, Thailand, Malaysia, Laos, Vietnam and mainland China. Its presence in Bangladesh is uncertain. It inhabits tropical and subtropical moist forests at elevations of 900 to 2,700 m (3,000 to 8,900 ft).

== Behaviour and ecology ==
The male's territorial call is a very loud pukwowk.
