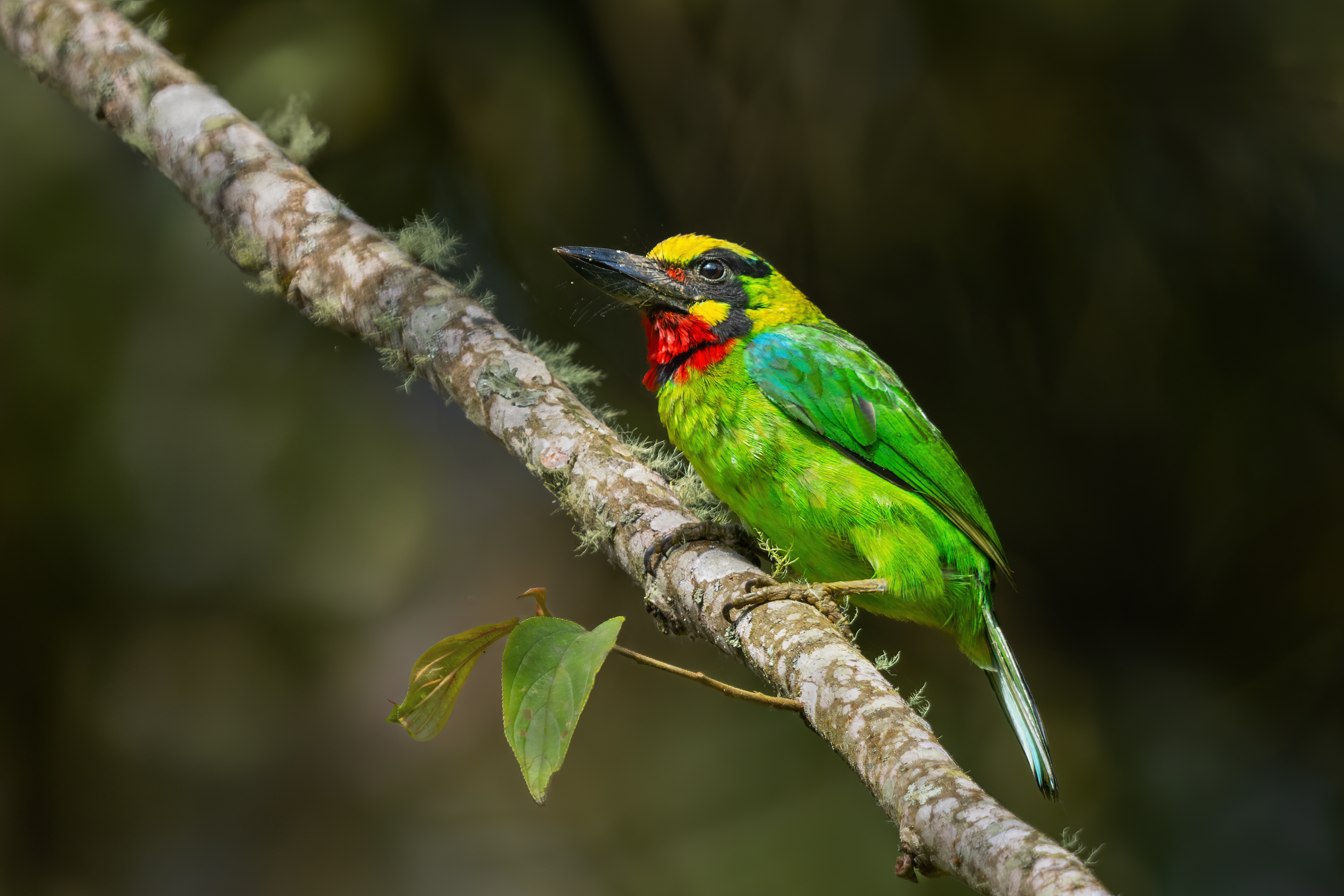

Conservation status
- Near Threatened (IUCN 3.1)

Scientific classification
- Kingdom: Animalia
- Phylum: Chordata
- Class: Aves
- Order: Piciformes
- Family: Megalaimidae
- Genus: Psilopogon
- Species: P. javensis

Binomial name
- Psilopogon javensis (Horsfield, 1821)

Synonyms
- Megalaima javensis

= Black-banded barbet =

Species of bird

The black-banded barbet (Psilopogon javensis) is a bird species in the Megalaimidae family. It is endemic to Java and Bali.

Its natural habitats are subtropical or tropical moist lowland forests and subtropical or tropical moist montane forests. It is threatened by habitat loss.

They are known to attract ecotourists to Java.
