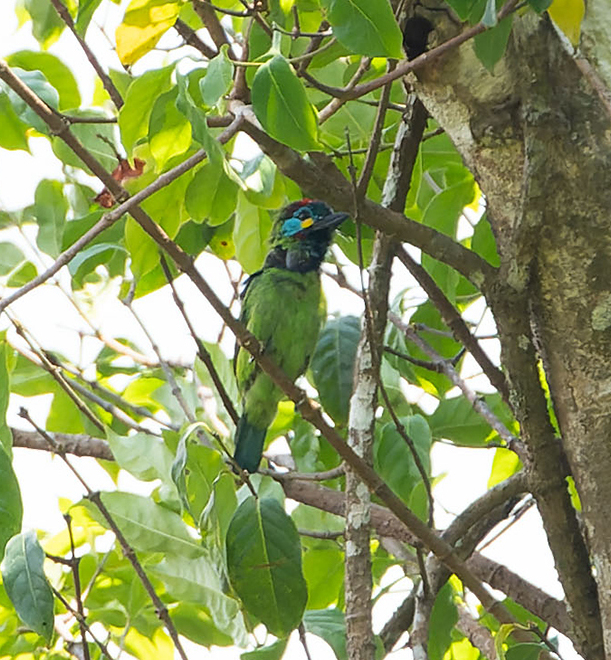

Conservation status
- Least Concern (IUCN 3.1)

Scientific classification
- Kingdom: Animalia
- Phylum: Chordata
- Class: Aves
- Order: Piciformes
- Family: Megalaimidae
- Genus: Psilopogon
- Species: P. eximius

Binomial name
- Psilopogon eximius (Sharpe, 1892)

Synonyms
- Megalaima eximia

= Bornean barbet =

Species of bird

The Bornean barbet (Psilopogon eximius) is a species of bird in the Megalaimidae family. It is found in Indonesia and Malaysia where it is endemic to the island of Borneo. Its natural habitats are subtropical or tropical moist lowland forests and subtropical or tropical moist montane forests.
