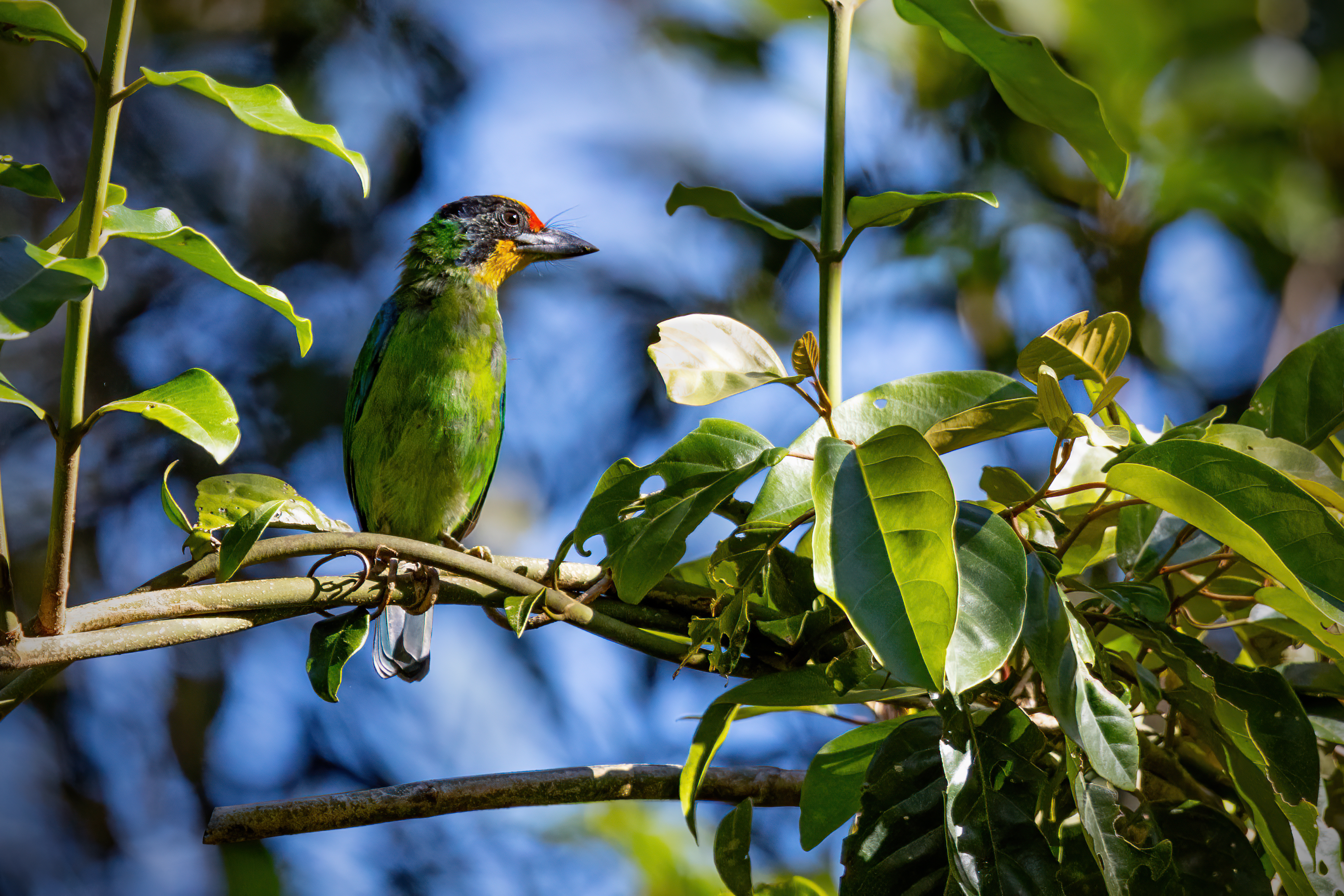

Conservation status
- Least Concern (IUCN 3.1)

Scientific classification
- Kingdom: Animalia
- Phylum: Chordata
- Class: Aves
- Order: Piciformes
- Family: Megalaimidae
- Genus: Psilopogon
- Species: P. auricularis

Binomial name
- Psilopogon auricularis (Robinson & Kloss, 1919)

= Necklaced barbet =

Species of bird

The necklaced barbet (Psilopogon auricularis) is an Asian barbet species occurring in Laos and southern Vietnam, where it inhabits subtropical, lowland tropical moist forests and montane forests up to an altitude of 2,700 m (8,900 ft).

Cyanops franklinii auricularis was the scientific name proposed by Herbert C. Robinson and C. Boden Kloss in 1919 for a barbet collected at the Langbian Plateau in southern Vietnam.
