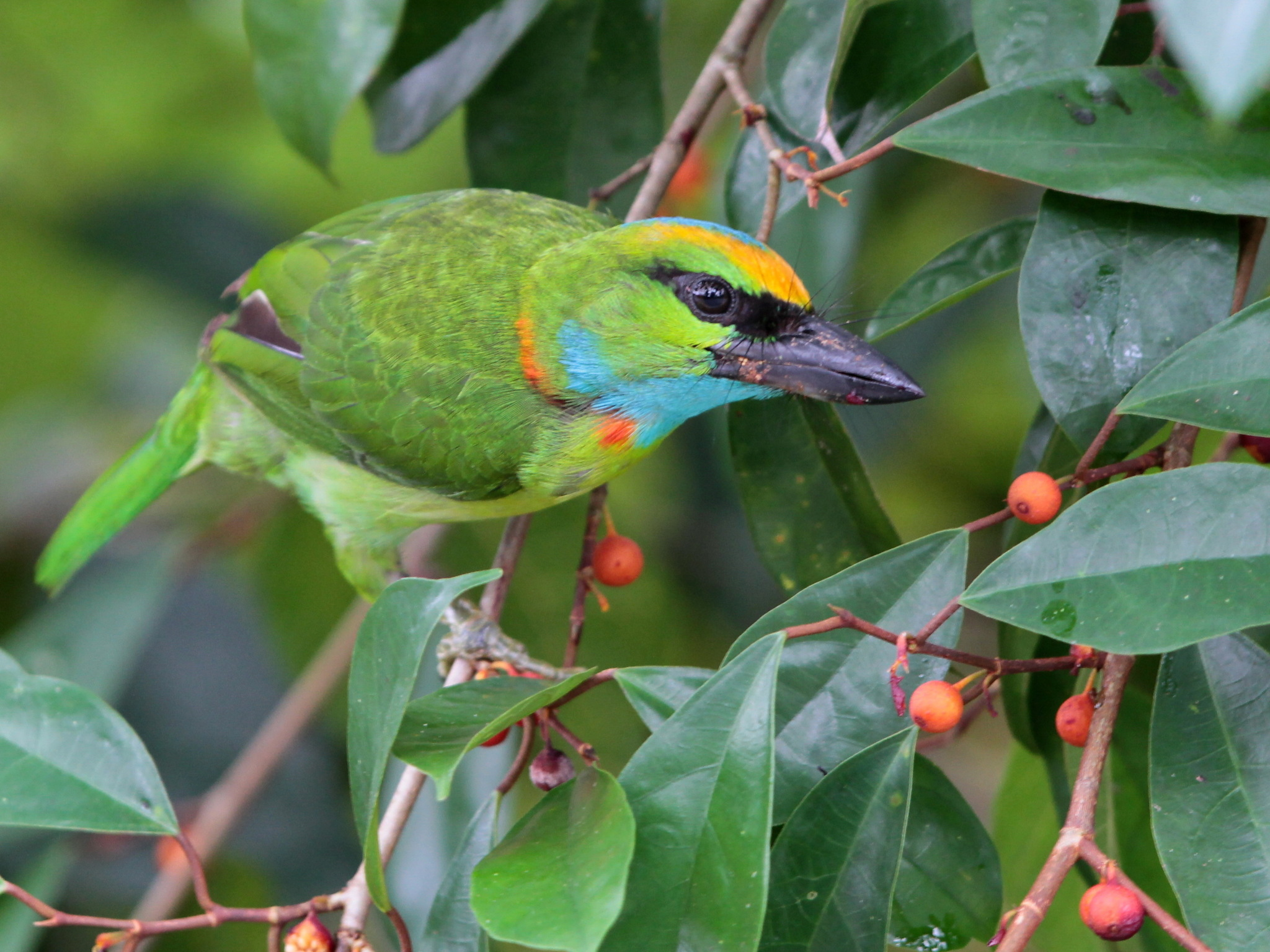

Conservation status
- Near Threatened (IUCN 3.1)

Scientific classification
- Kingdom: Animalia
- Phylum: Chordata
- Class: Aves
- Order: Piciformes
- Family: Megalaimidae
- Genus: Psilopogon
- Species: P. henricii

Binomial name
- Psilopogon henricii (Temminck, 1831)

Synonyms
- Megalaima henricii

= Yellow-crowned barbet =

Species of bird

The yellow-crowned barbet (Psilopogon henricii) is a species of bird in the Megalaimidae family. It is found in Brunei, Indonesia, Malaysia, Singapore, and Thailand. Its natural habitats are subtropical or tropical moist lowland forests and subtropical or tropical swamps. It is threatened by habitat loss.
