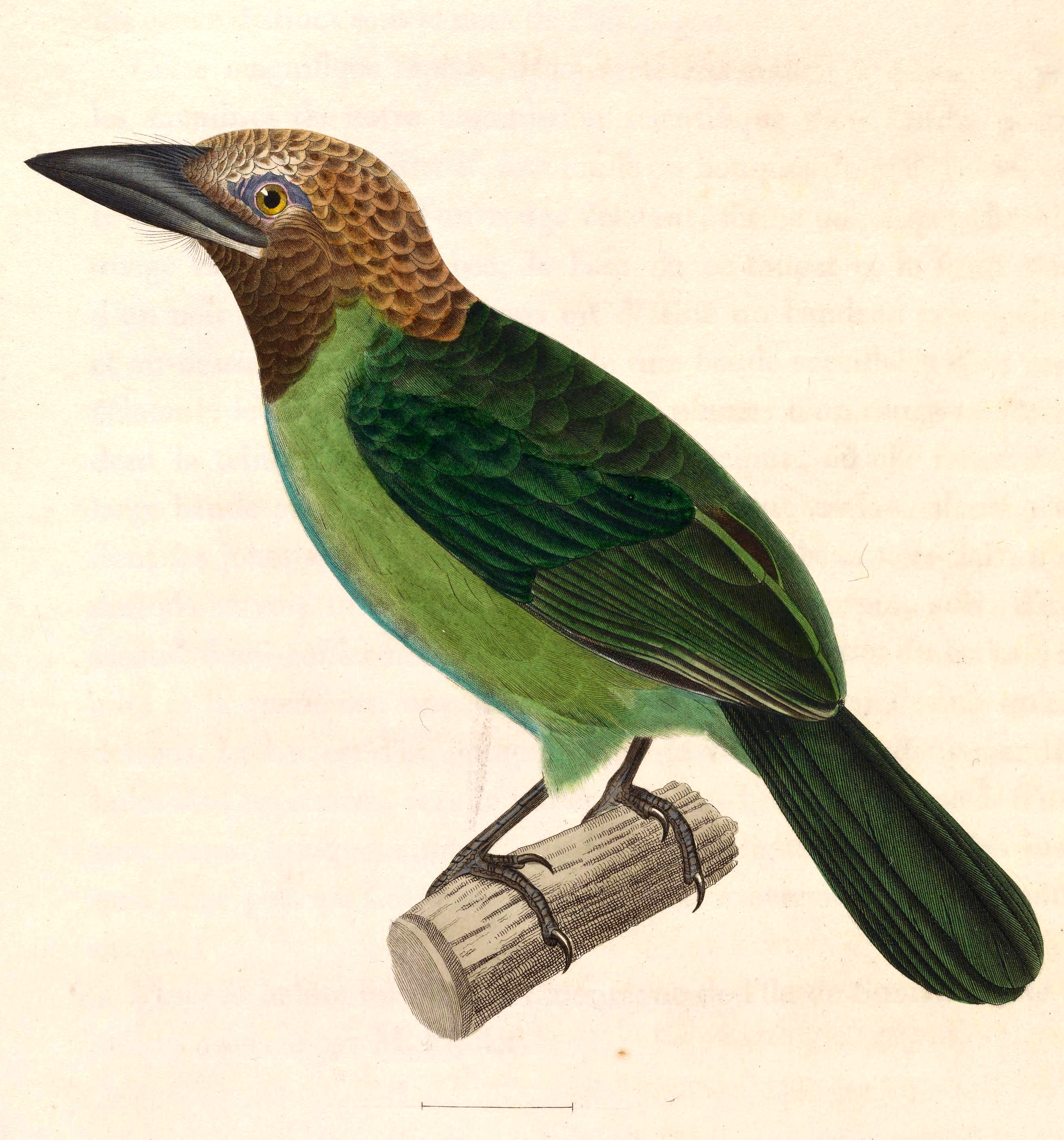

Conservation status
- Least Concern (IUCN 3.1)

Scientific classification
- Kingdom: Animalia
- Phylum: Chordata
- Class: Aves
- Order: Piciformes
- Family: Megalaimidae
- Genus: Psilopogon
- Species: P. corvinus

Binomial name
- Psilopogon corvinus (Temminck, 1831)

Synonyms
- Megalaima corvina

= Brown-throated barbet =

Species of bird

The brown-throated barbet (Psilopogon corvinus) is a species of bird in the family Megalaimidae. It is endemic to western Java.

Its natural habitats are subtropical or tropical moist lowland forests and subtropical or tropical moist montane forests.
