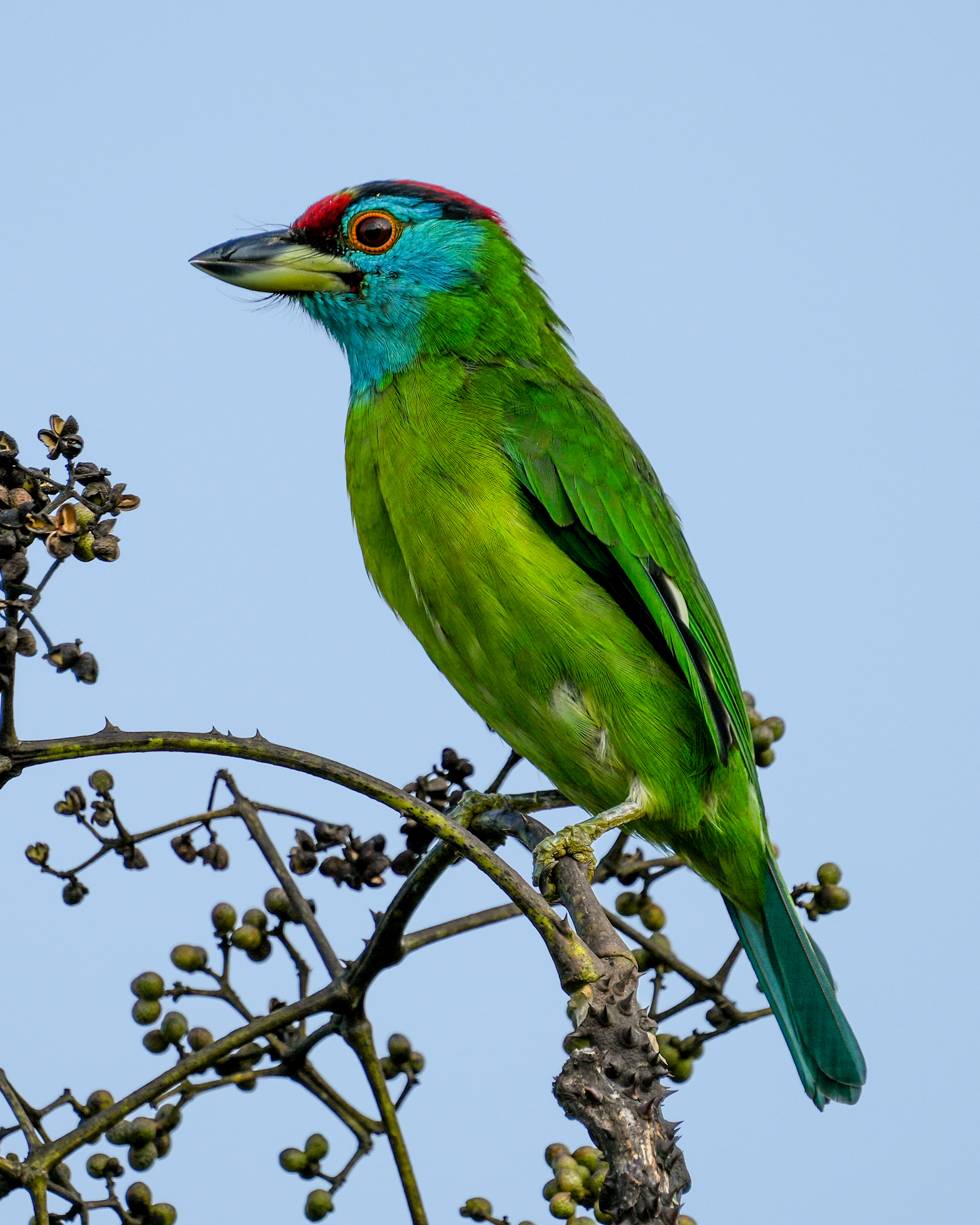
- Blue-throated barbet, Meghalaya, India

Scientific classification
- Kingdom: Animalia
- Phylum: Chordata
- Class: Aves
- Order: Piciformes
- Suborder: Pici
- Infraorder: Ramphastides
- Family: Megalaimidae; Blyth, 1852

Genera
- Psilopogon; Caloramphus

= Megalaimidae =

Megalaimidae Temporal range: Pleistocene to Recent

Family of birds

Megalaimidae, the Asian barbets, are a family of birds, comprising two genera with 35 species native to the forests of the Indomalayan realm from Tibet to Indonesia. They were once clubbed with all barbets in the family Capitonidae but the Old World species have been found to be distinctive and are considered, along with the Lybiidae and Ramphastidae, as sister groups.

== Taxonomy ==
In the past the species were placed in three genera, Caloramphus, Megalaima and Psilopogon, but studies show that Psilopogon to be nested within the clade of Megalaima. Since members of this clade are better treated under a single genus, they have been moved to the genus Psilopogon which was described and erected earlier than Megalaima and is therefore chosen on the basis of taxonomic priority principles. Nearly all members of the family are now in the genus Psilopogon, with the exception of those in Caloramphus, which are thought to have genetically diverged from the common ancestor around 21.32 million years ago. The latter species are distinct enough to warrant placement in a subfamily Caloramphinae. The family name is derived from that of the genus Megalaima which means ‘large throat’, from the Greek mega (μέγας, ‘large, great’) and laimos (λαιμός, ‘throat’).

The phylogenetic relationship between the Asian barbets and the eight other families in the order Piciformes is shown in the cladogram below. The number of species in each family is taken from the list maintained by Frank Gill, Pamela C. Rasmussen and David Donsker on behalf of the International Ornithological Committee (IOC).

- Piciformes
  - - Galbulidae – jacamars (18 species)
    - Bucconidae – puffbirds (38 species)
  - - - Indicatoridae – honeyguides (16 species)
      - Picidae – woodpeckers (240 species)
    - - Megalaimidae – Asian barbets (35 species)
      - - Lybiidae – African barbets (42 species)
        - - Capitonidae – New World barbets (15 species)
          - - Semnornithidae – toucan barbets (2 species)
            - Ramphastidae – toucans (43 species)

== Classification ==
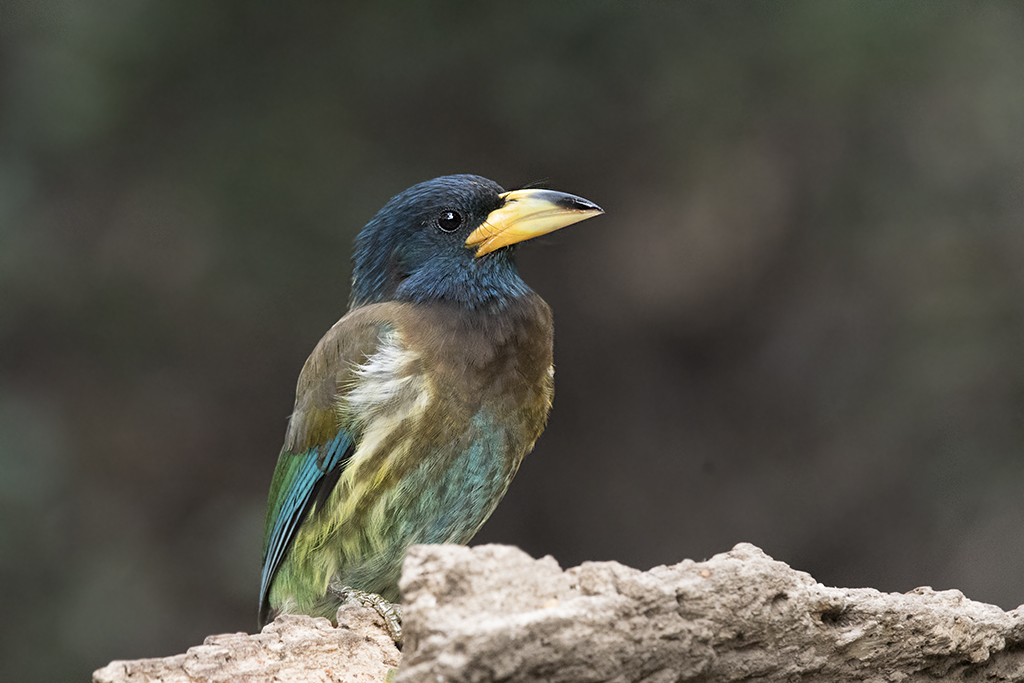
Great barbet

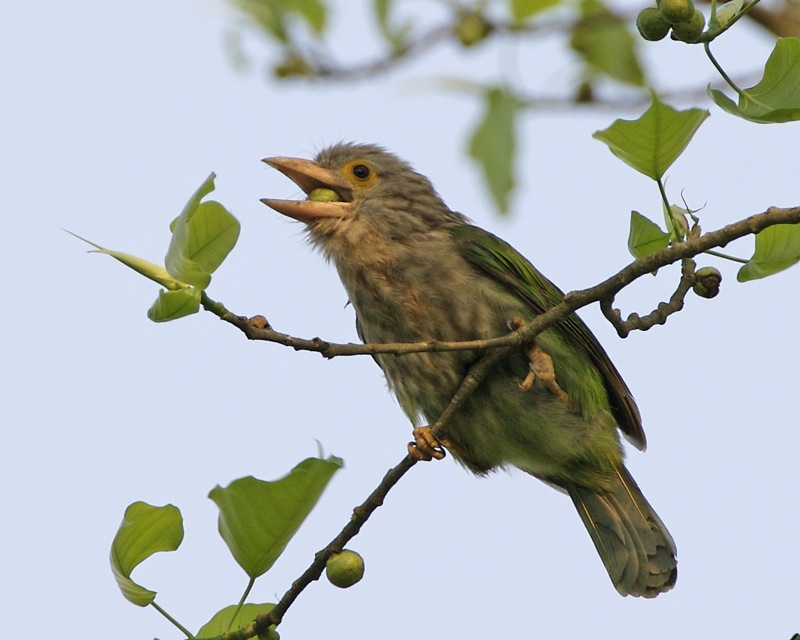
Lineated barbet

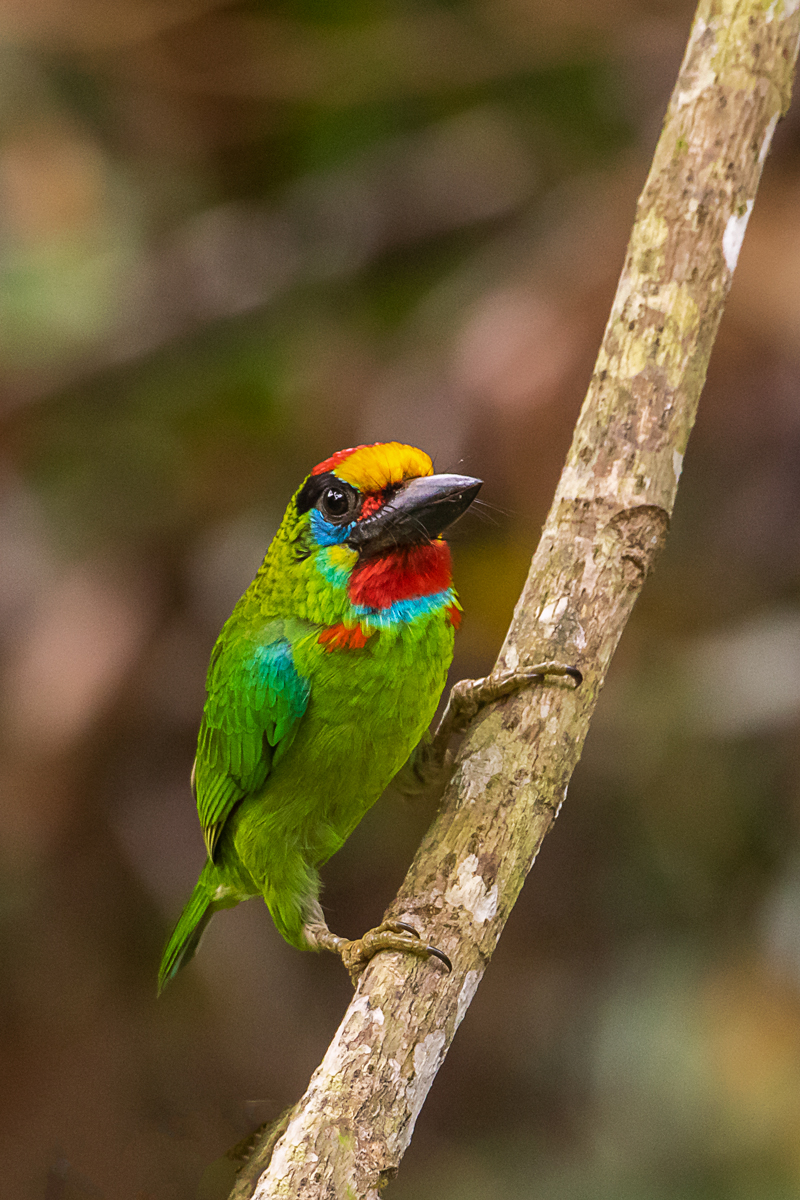
Red-throated barbet

Subfamily Megalaiminae

Image	Genus	Living Species
	Psilopogon Müller, S., 1836	Psilopogon annamensis, Indochinese barbet; Psilopogon armillaris, Flame-fronted barbet; Psilopogon asiaticus, Blue-throated barbet; Psilopogon auricularis, Necklaced barbet; Psilopogon australis, Yellow-eared barbet; Psilopogon chersonesus, Turquoise-throated barbet; Psilopogon chrysopogon, Golden-whiskered barbet; Psilopogon corvinus, Brown-throated barbet; Psilopogon cyanotis, Blue-eared barbet; Psilopogon duvaucelii, Black-eared barbet; Psilopogon eximius, Bornean barbet; Psilopogon faber, Chinese barbet; Psilopogon faiostrictus, Green-eared barbet; Psilopogon flavifrons, Yellow-fronted barbet; Psilopogon franklinii, Golden-throated barbet; Psilopogon haemacephalus, Coppersmith barbet; Psilopogon henricii, Yellow-crowned barbet; Psilopogon incognitus, Moustached barbet; Psilopogon javensis, Black-banded barbet; Psilopogon lagrandieri, Red-vented barbet; Psilopogon lineatus, Lineated barbet; Psilopogon malabaricus, Malabar barbet; Psilopogon monticola, Mountain barbet; Psilopogon mystacophanos, Red-throated barbet; Psilopogon nuchalis, Taiwan barbet; Psilopogon oorti, Black-browed barbet; Psilopogon pulcherrimus, Golden-naped barbet; Psilopogon pyrolophus, Fire-tufted barbet; Psilopogon rafflesii, Red-crowned barbet; Psilopogon rubricapillus, Crimson-fronted barbet; Psilopogon virens, Great barbet; Psilopogon viridis, White-cheeked barbet; Psilopogon zeylanicus, Brown-headed barbet

Subfamily Caloramphinae

Image	Genus	Living Species
	Caloramphus Lesson, 1839	Caloramphus fuliginosus, Brown barbet; Caloramphus hayii, Sooty barbet
