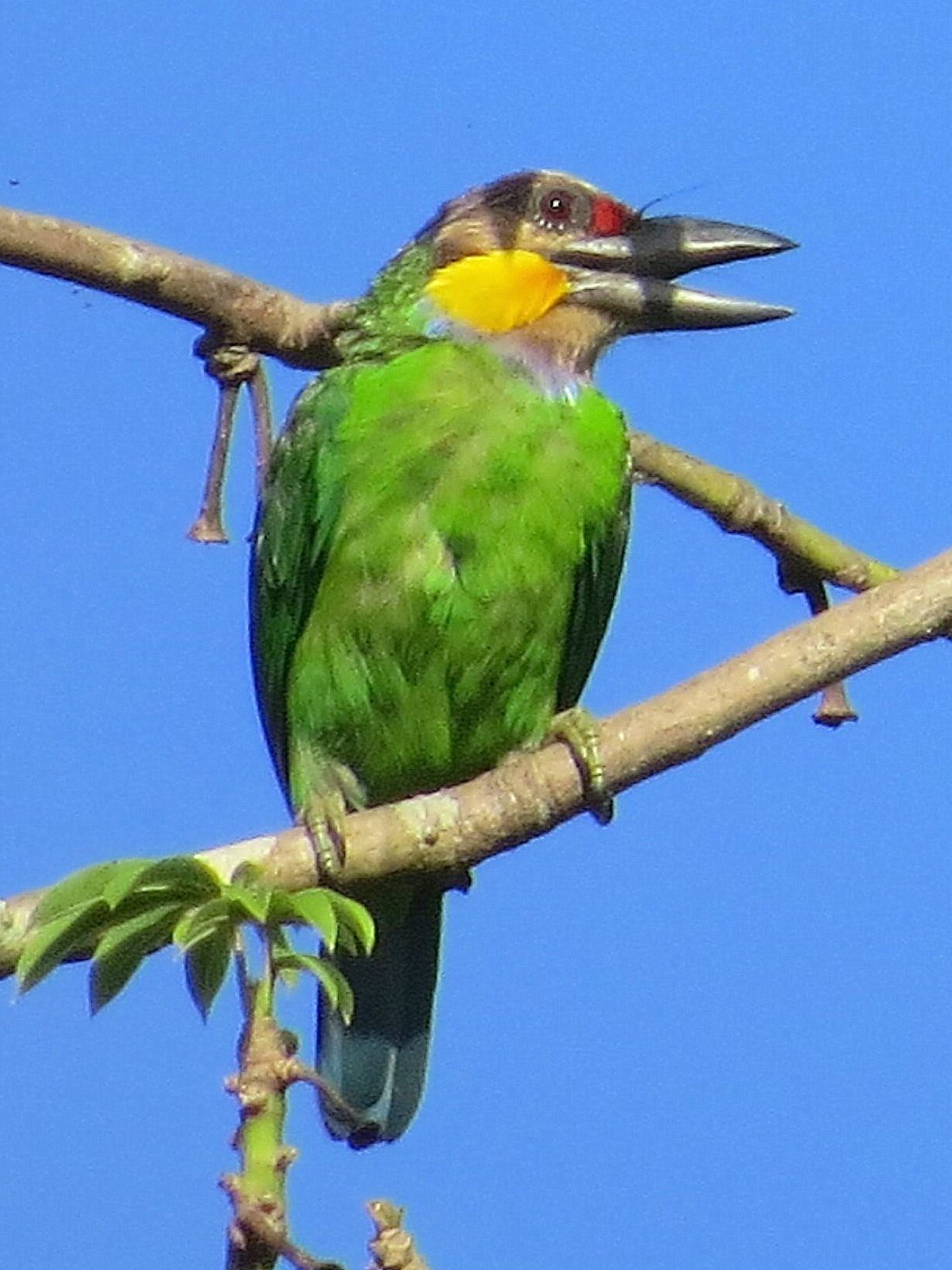
- Golden-whiskered barbet in Malaysia

Conservation status
- Least Concern (IUCN 3.1)

Scientific classification
- Kingdom: Animalia
- Phylum: Chordata
- Class: Aves
- Order: Piciformes
- Family: Megalaimidae
- Genus: Psilopogon
- Species: P. chrysopogon

Binomial name
- Psilopogon chrysopogon (Temminck, 1824)

Synonyms
- Megalaima chrysopogon

= Golden-whiskered barbet =

Species of bird

The golden-whiskered barbet (Psilopogon chrysopogon) is an Asian barbet species native to the western Malay Archipelago, where it inhabits foremost forests up to 1,500 m (4,900 ft) elevation. It has been listed as Least Concern on the IUCN Red List since 2004 because of its wide distribution.

== Description ==
The golden-whiskered barbet has a green plumage of various hues. On both sides of the black beak it has a yellow moustache that extends to the ear canal. Its throat is blue, and it has small blue and red spots on the head. Its eyes are also surrounded by blue. Its forecrown is pale yellow, with red patches on both sides of the beak. It is 30 cm (12 in) long and weighs 110–215 g (3.9–7.6 oz). Female and male are similar in appearance but display a small degree of sexual dichromatism in that the beaks of the female appear paler with a dusky bluish color. Before reaching maturity birds of both sexes have duller overall plumage.

== Distribution and habitat ==
The golden-whiskered barbet ranges from the Malay Peninsula to Sumatra and Borneo, where it inhabits tropical and subtropical moist broadleaf forests and montane forest. It has also been sighted in cacao plantation and second growth forests but is rare in evergreen and swamp forests.

== Behaviour and ecology ==
The golden-whiskered barbet spends most of the day in the forest canopy. It forages mostly on figs and berries. As it has been observed picking on dead wood, it is assumed that it also looks for insects. It sings a series of 'too-tuk' notes, and when breeding also despite high temperatures during day. It breeds from February to August and lays two eggs per clutch.

== Taxonomy ==
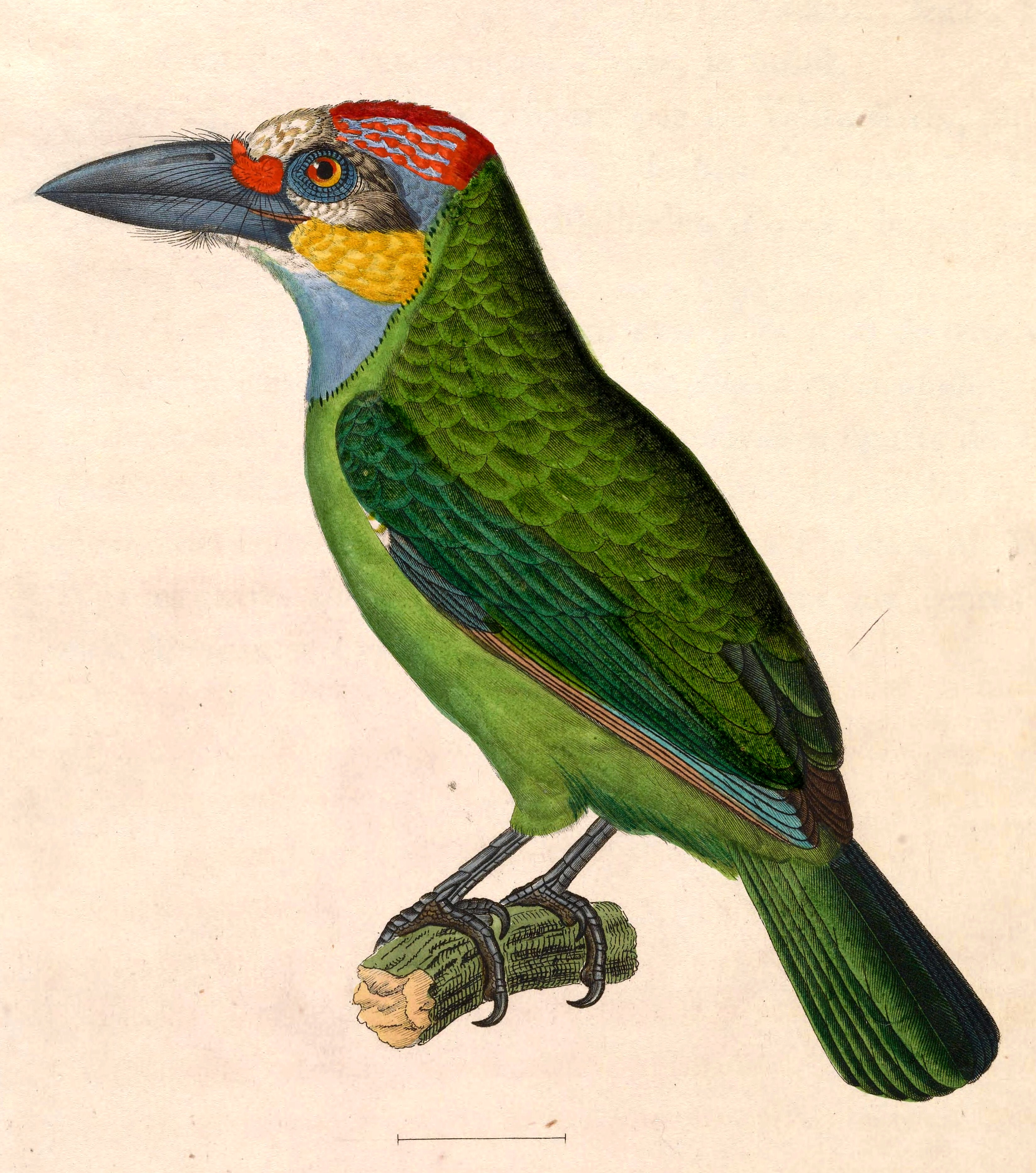

Bucco chrysopogon was the scientific name proposed by Coenraad Jacob Temminck in 1824 for a gold-whiskered barbet from Sumatra. Asian barbets were placed in the genus Megalaima proposed by George Robert Gray in 1842 who suggested to use this name instead of Bucco. Megalaima chrysopsis proposed by Andreas Goffin in 1863 was based on two gold-whiskered barbets collected in Borneo. Chrotorhea chrysopogon laetus proposed by Herbert C. Robinson and C. Boden Kloss in 1918 was a gold-whiskered barbet collected at Mount Kerinci in Sumatra. Three golden-whiskered barbet subspecies are recognized as of 2014:

- P. c. chrysopogon occurs in Sumatra
- P. c. chrysopsis occurs in Borneo
- P. c. laetus ranges from southwestern Thailand to Peninsular Malaysia

== Other names ==
In Mandarin Chinese it is known as 金须拟䴕 (jīnxū nǐliè) "golden-whiskered false woodpecker" or 金颊拟啄木鸟 (jīn jiá nǐ-zhuómù-niǎo) or as "gold-cheeked false woodpecker". Its Japanese name is キホオゴシキドリ or 黄頬五色鳥 (kihō goshikidori), "yellow-cheeked five-coloured bird."
