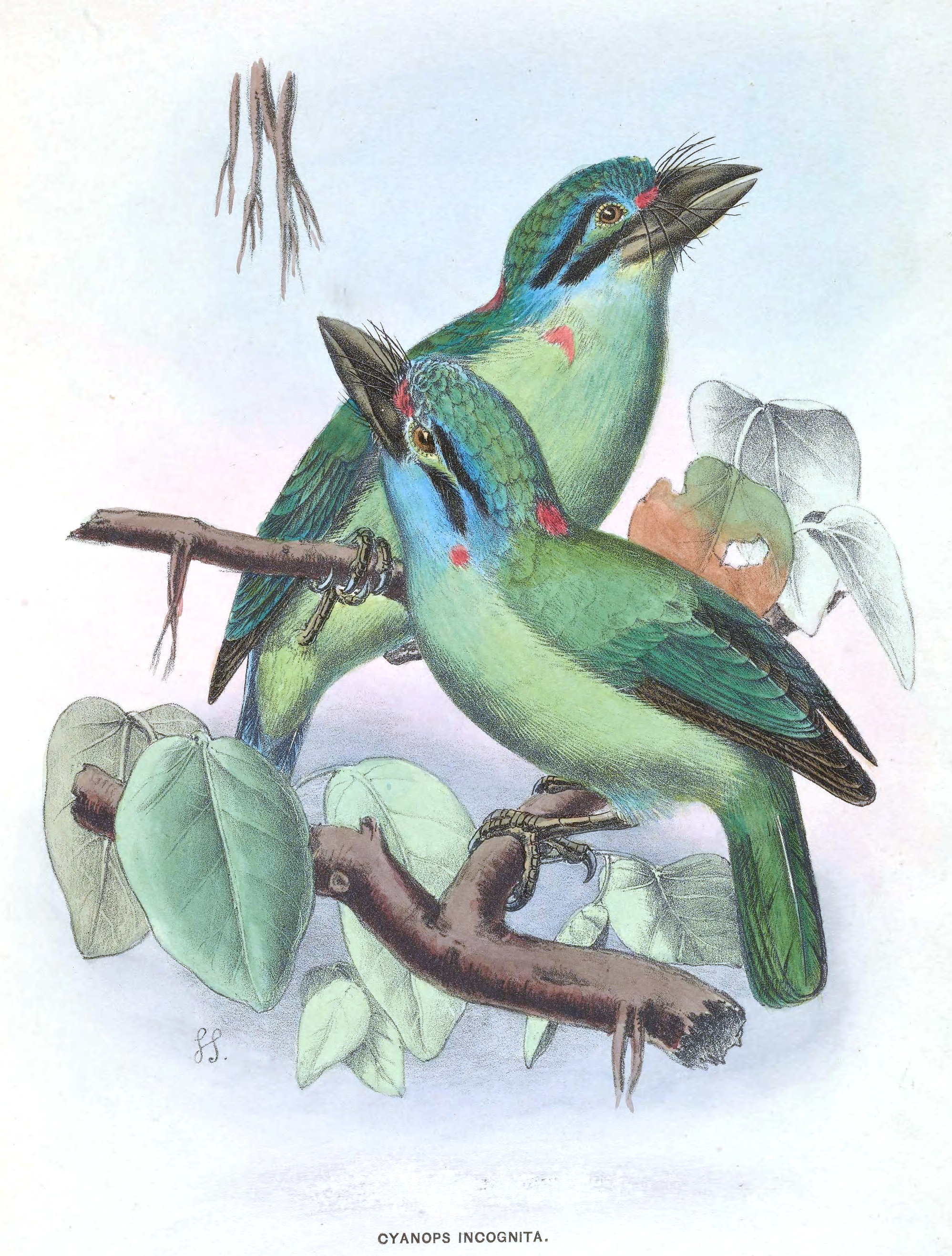

Conservation status
- Least Concern (IUCN 3.1)

Scientific classification
- Kingdom: Animalia
- Phylum: Chordata
- Class: Aves
- Order: Piciformes
- Family: Megalaimidae
- Genus: Psilopogon
- Species: P. incognitus

Binomial name
- Psilopogon incognitus (Hume, 1874)

Synonyms
- Cyanops incognita Megalaima incognitus

= Moustached barbet =

Species of bird

The moustached barbet (Psilopogon incognitus) is an Asian barbet. Barbets are a group of birds with a world-wide tropical distribution. They get their name from the bristles which fringe their heavy bills.

The moustached barbet is a resident breeder in the hills of Myanmar, Thailand, Cambodia, Laos and Vietnam. It is a species of broadleaf evergreen forest from 600 to 700 m. It nests in a tree hole.

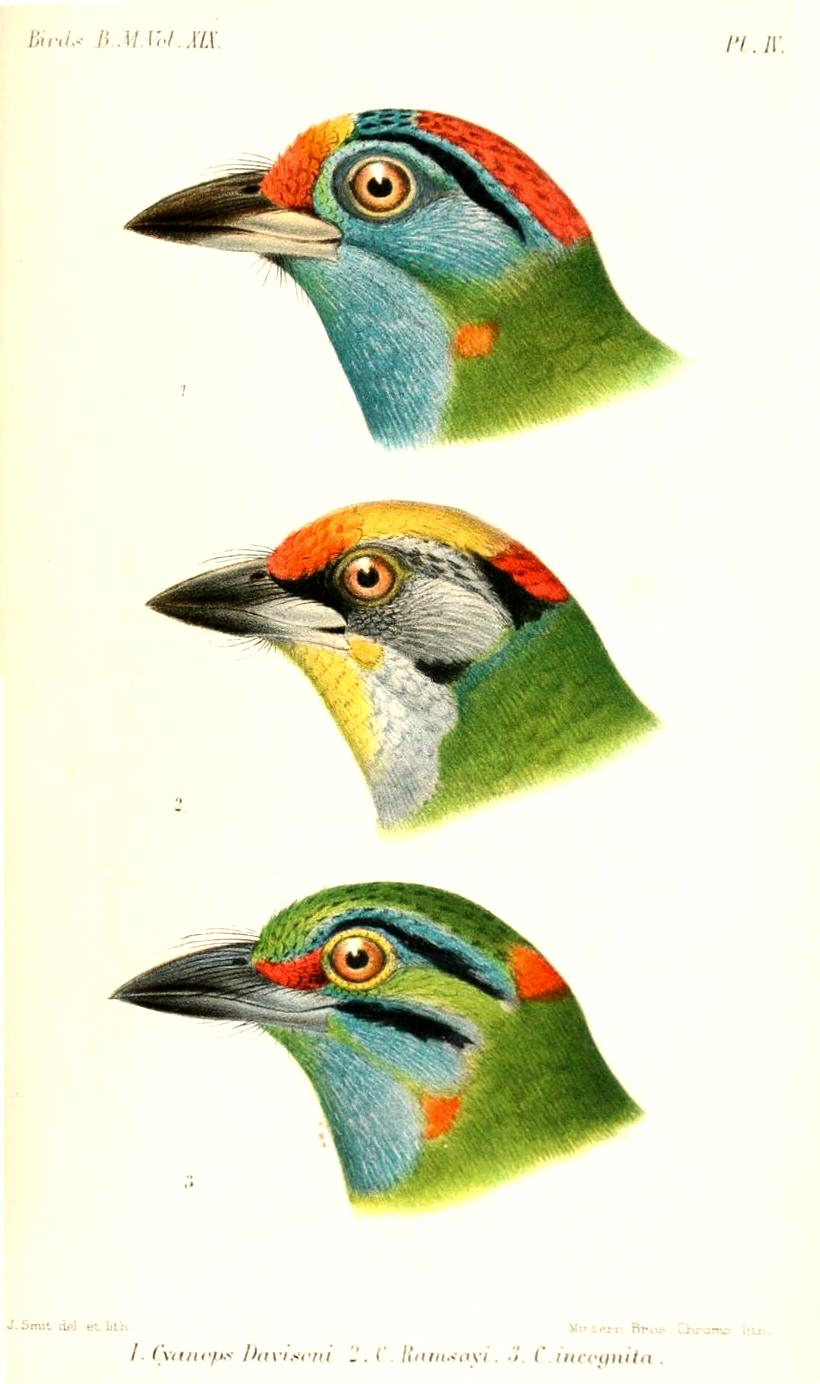
Head (bottom), illustration by Joseph Smit, 1891

This barbet is 23 cm in length. It is a plump bird, with a short neck, large head and short tail. The bill is dark horn, and the body plumage is green. The adult of the form, P. i. elbeli, which occurs in northern Thailand has a red forehead, green crown with a red spot at the rear, a blue face and throat, and black eyestripe and moustache. The sexes are similar, but the juvenile has a duller, greener head and throat with a narrower moustache..

The other subspecies are nominate P. i. incognitus in Myanmar and western Thailand, and P. i. eurous in east Thailand, Cambodia, Laos and Vietnam.

The male's territorial call is a repeated loud u'ik-a-ruk u'ik-a-ruk u'ik-a-ruk.

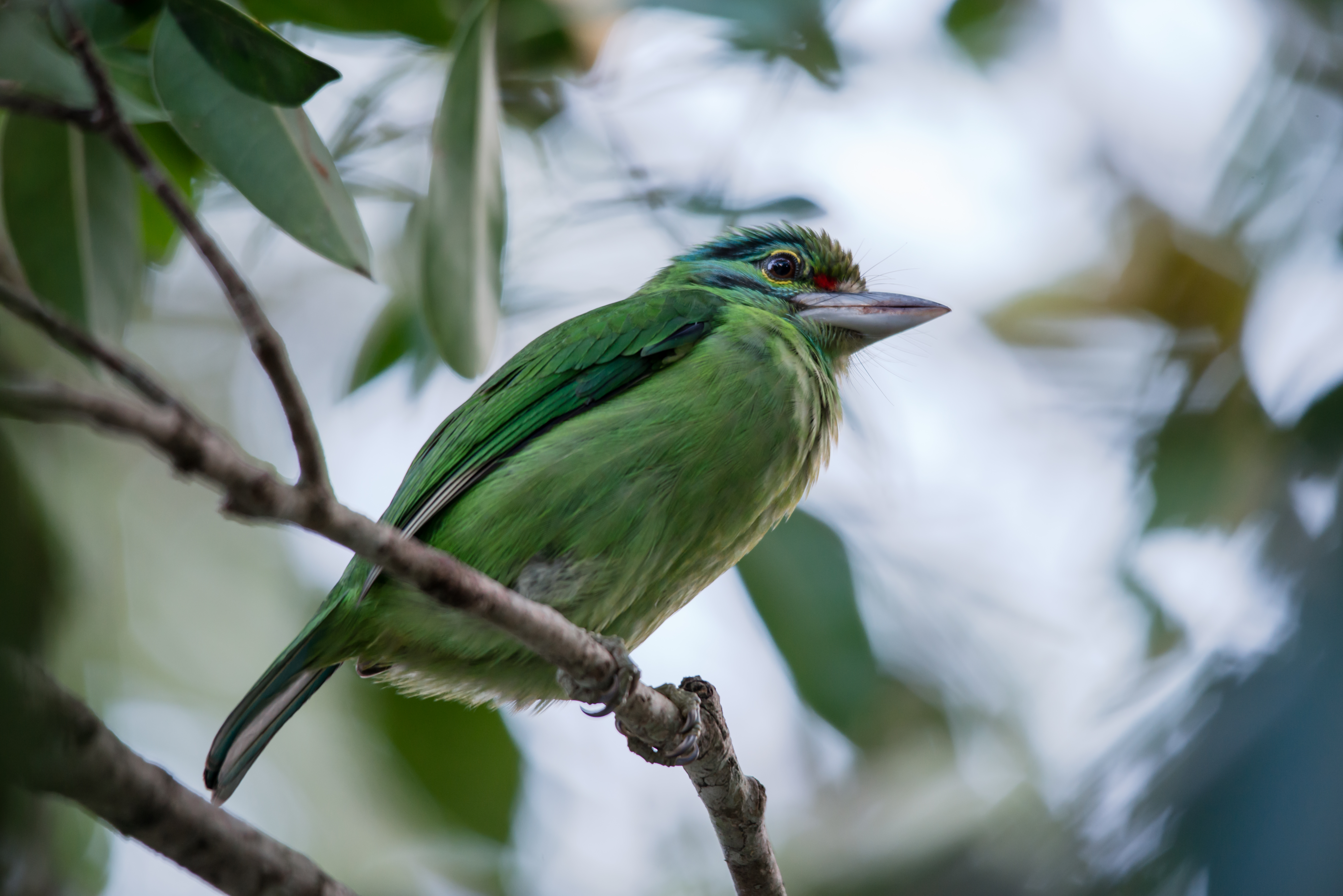
Juvenile, Khao Yai National Park / Thailand
