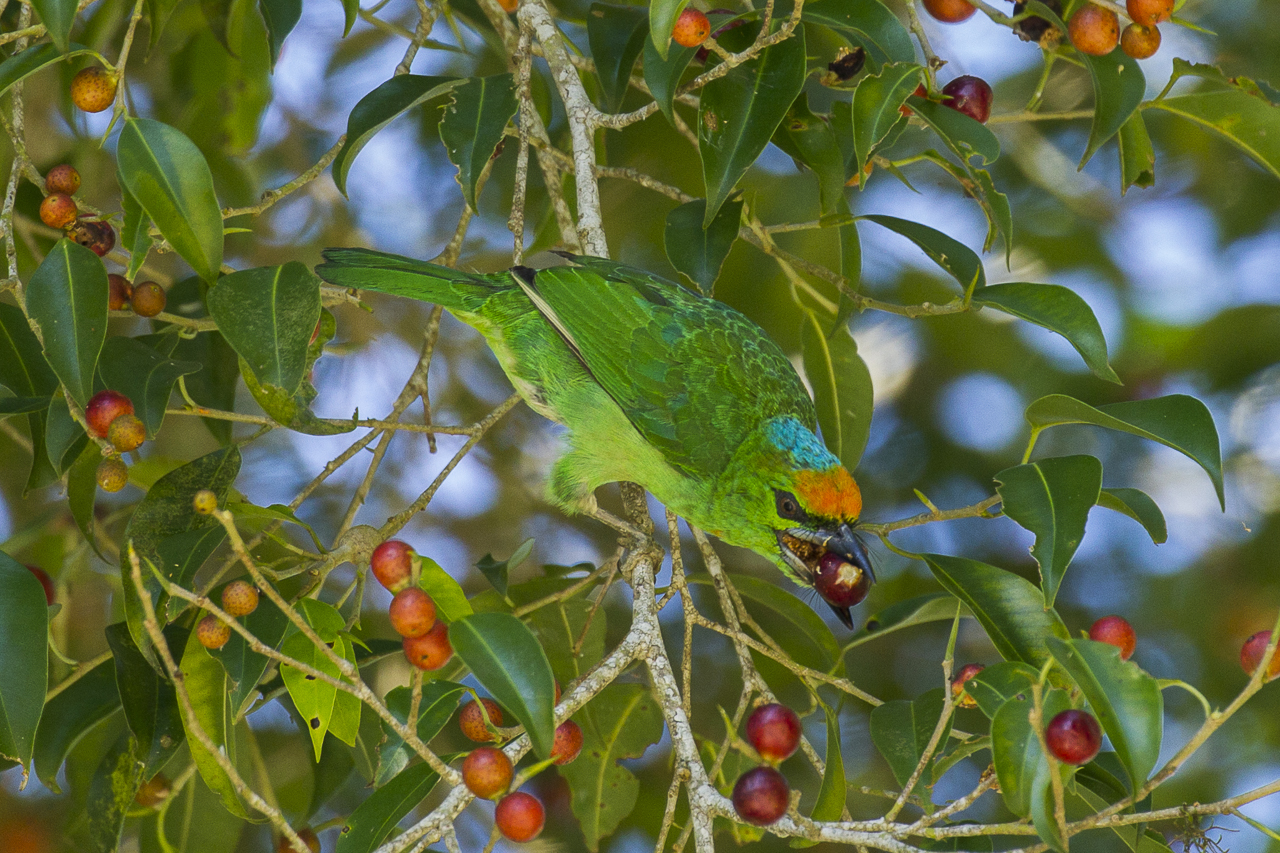

Conservation status
- Least Concern (IUCN 3.1)

Scientific classification
- Kingdom: Animalia
- Phylum: Chordata
- Class: Aves
- Order: Piciformes
- Family: Megalaimidae
- Genus: Psilopogon
- Species: P. armillaris

Binomial name
- Psilopogon armillaris (Temminck, 1821)

Synonyms
- Megalaima armillaris

= Flame-fronted barbet =

Species of bird

The flame-fronted barbet (Psilopogon armillaris) is an Asian barbet native to Java and Bali. It has a green plumage, a yellow-orange forehead, a blue nape, and an orange crescent on the chest. It is about 19.5–23 cm (7.7–9.1 in) long and weighs 61–79 g (2.2–2.8 oz). Its natural habitats are subtropical or tropical moist lowland forest and subtropical or tropical moist montane forest.
