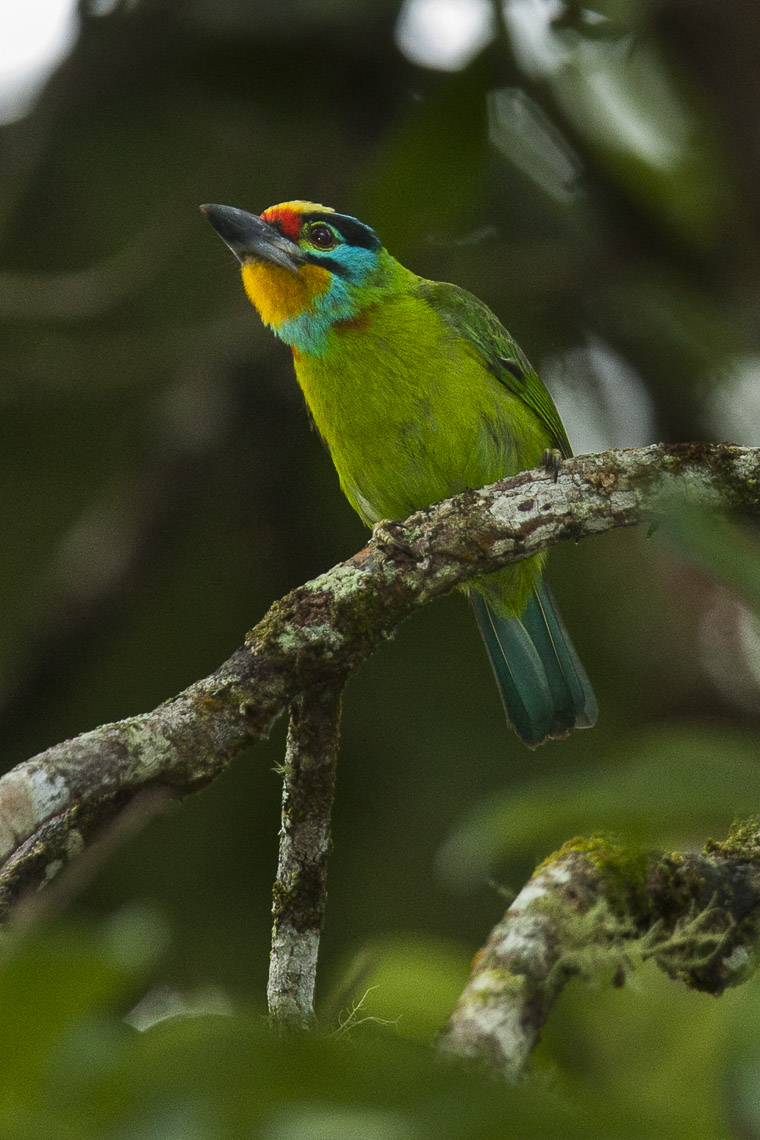

Conservation status
- Least Concern (IUCN 3.1)

Scientific classification
- Kingdom: Animalia
- Phylum: Chordata
- Class: Aves
- Order: Piciformes
- Family: Megalaimidae
- Genus: Psilopogon
- Species: P. oorti

Binomial name
- Psilopogon oorti (S. Müller, 1836)

Synonyms
- Megalaima oorti

= Black-browed barbet =

Species of bird

The black-browed barbet (Psilopogon oorti) is an Asian barbet native to Peninsular Malaysia and Sumatra, where it inhabits foremost forests between 600 and 2,000 m (2,000 and 6,600 ft) altitude. It is listed as Least Concern on the IUCN Red List because of its wide distribution and stable population.

== Taxonomy ==
Bucco oortii was the scientific name proposed by Salomon Müller in 1835 who described a barbet specimen collected in Sumatra. It was placed in the genus Megalaima proposed by George Robert Gray in 1842 who suggested to use this name instead of Bucco. Molecular phylogenetic research of Asian barbets revealed that Megalaima species form a clade, which also includes the fire-tufted barbet, the only species placed in the genus Psilopogon at the time. Barbets formerly placed in this genus were therefore reclassified in the genus Psilopogon.

== Description ==
The black-browed barbet is mostly green with a yellow blue-bordered throat. It has black streaks above the eyes and red patches above its bill, lores, throat and nape. One female measured was 21.5 cm (8.5 in) long and weighed 62 g (2.2 oz).

== Distribution and habitat ==
The black-browed barbet inhabits montane and dipterocarp forests between 600 and 2,000 m (2,000 and 6,600 ft) in western Sumatra and Peninsular Malaysia.

== Behaviour and ecology ==
The black-browed barbet forages on insects and fruits in the upper and middle levels of the canopy. In Sumatra, it breeds from February to November, and in Malaysia from March to June. It nests in tree holes.
