= Fire-tufted barbet =

Conservation status
- Least Concern (IUCN 3.1)

Scientific classification
- Kingdom: Animalia
- Phylum: Chordata
- Class: Aves
- Order: Piciformes
- Family: Megalaimidae
- Genus: Psilopogon
- Species: P. pyrolophus

Binomial name
- Psilopogon pyrolophus S. Müller, 1836

Species of bird

The fire-tufted barbet (Psilopogon pyrolophus) is a species of bird in the Asian barbet family Megalaimidae. It is native to Peninsular Malaysia and Sumatra, where it inhabits tropical moist lowland and montane forests. It has been listed as Least Concern on the IUCN Red List since 2004. Its scientific name was proposed by Salomon Müller in 1836, who described a barbet from Sumatra.

== Description ==
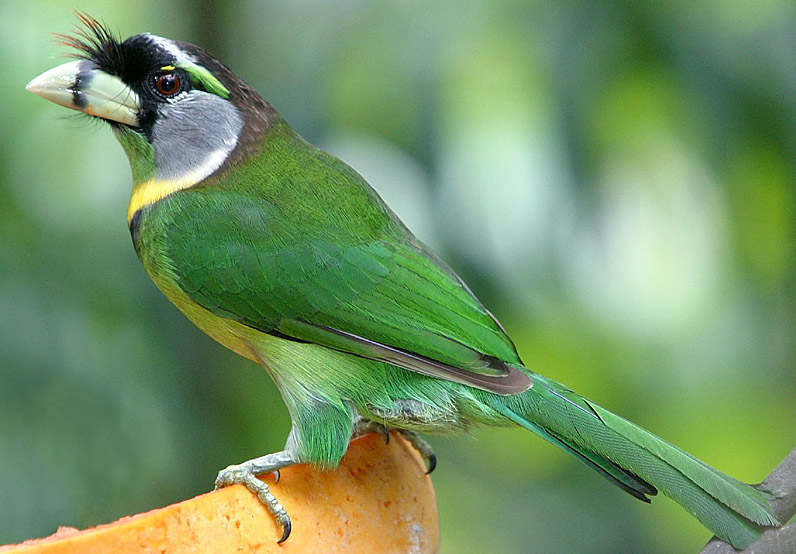
female bird

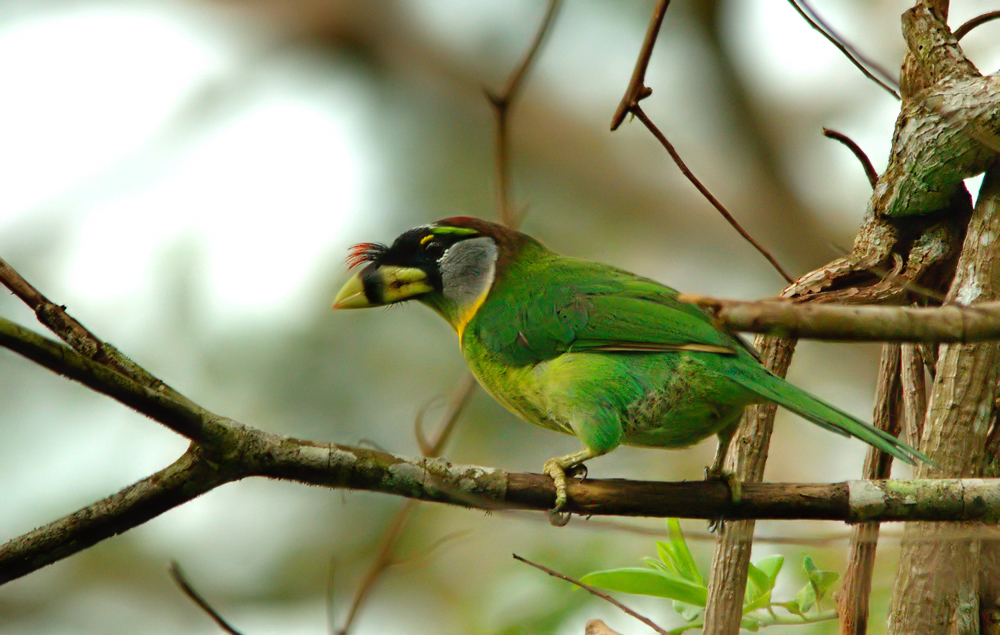
Adult fire-tufted barbet in Genting Highlands, Malaysia

The fire-tufted barbet is green with a brownish-maroon nape, grey lores, and a white band on the forehead. Its throat is green, followed by a bright yellow band before a black band, appearing like a necklace. The bill is fawn coloured with a black vertical band. It has tufts of feathers at the base of beak. The upper tufts of males are fiery orange. The adult fire-tufted barbet is 28 cm (11 in) long.

== Distribution and habitat ==
Fire-tufted barbet at Fraser's Hill, Malaysia, August 1994

The fire-tufted barbet inhabits broad-leaved evergreen montane forests between 1,070 and 2,010 m (3,510 and 6,590 ft) on the Malay Peninsula and Sumatra. Three fire-tufted barbets observed on Mount Gede in West Java between 2003 and 2005 are thought to have escaped from aviaries in this area.

== Behaviour and ecology ==
The fire-tufted barbet is a resident bird and feeds on figs, other fruits, arthropods and insects. Its call is very similar to that of cicadas.

== Threats ==
The fire-tufted barbet is primarily threatened by illegal capture and trade as a pet.
