= Salomon Müller =

German naturalist (1804–1864)

- Born: 7 April 1804; Heidelberg
- Died: 29 December 1864 (aged 60); Freiburg im Breisgau
- Scientific career
- Fields: Naturalist
- Institutions: Dutch East Indies
- Patrons: Coenraad Jacob Temminck
- Author abbrev. (zoology): Müller

Salomon Müller (7 April 1804 – 29 December 1864) was a German naturalist. He was born in Heidelberg, and died in Freiburg im Breisgau.

Müller was the son of a saddler in Heidelberg. Along with Heinrich Boie and Heinrich Christian Macklot, he was sent by Coenraad Jacob Temminck to collect specimens in the East Indies. Here, he worked as an assistant for the Natuurkundige Commissie (Commission for Natural Sciences), an organization that he eventually became a member of.

Müller arrived in Batavia in 1826, then journeyed to New Guinea and Timor in 1828 aboard the Triton. He published a number of works drawing on his experiences during that voyage along the coast of New Guinea. Beginning in October 1828, he remained at the port city of Kupang, penetrating the interior of Timor during the following year. In 1831, he was stationed in Java, and later explored western Sumatra from 1833 to 1835.

== Eponyms ==
Hermann Schlegel named Aspidomorphus muelleri (Müller's crown snake) and Sphenomorphus muelleri (Müller's forest skink) in 1837, and Typhlops muelleri (Müller's blind snake) in 1839, all in honor of Salomon Müller. Müller in turn named Tomistoma schlegelii (false gharial) in 1838 in honor of Hermann Schlegel.

Similarly, André Marie Constant Duméril, Gabriel Bibron and Auguste Duméril named Lycodon muelleri (Java wolf snake) in 1854 in honor of Müller.

== Selected publications ==
- Reizen en onderzoekingen in Sumatra, gedaan op last der Nederlandsche Indische regering, tusschen de jaren 1833 en 1838, 1855. (in Dutch).
- Reizen en onderzoekingen in den Indischen archipel, gedaan op last der Nederlandsche Indische regering, tusschen de jaren 1828 en 1836, 1857. (in Dutch).
