= List of birds of South India =

This list of birds of South India includes birds from India south approximately of the Narmada River.

Notable bird watching locations in South India include Rollapadu in Andhra Pradesh; Nagarhole National Park and Bandipur National Park in Karnataka; Rajamalai (Eravikulam National Park) and Periyar National Park in Kerala; Mudumalai National Park, Udhagamandalam, Indira Gandhi Wildlife Sanctuary in Anamalai; Vedanthangal and Point Calimere Wildlife and Bird Sanctuary in Kodikkarai, Tamil Nadu.

== Francolins and spurfowls ==
- Painted francolin, Francolinus pictus
- Grey francolin, Francolinus pondicerianus
- Red spurfowl, Galloperdix spadicea
- Painted spurfowl, Galloperdix lunulata

== Quails and buttonquails ==
- Blue-breasted quail, Coturnix chinensis
- Common quail, Coturnix coturnix
- Rain quail, Coturnix coromandelica
- Jungle bush quail, Perdicula asiatica
- Rock bush quail, Perdicula argoondah
- Painted bush quail, Perdicula erythrorhyncha
- Small buttonquail, Turnix sylvatica
- Yellow-legged buttonquail, Turnix tanki
- Barred buttonquail, Turnix suscitator

== Galliformes ==
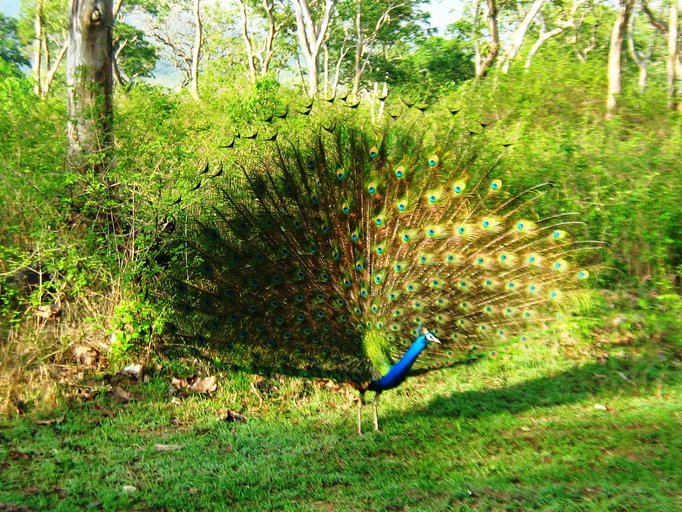
Indian peafowl in Mudumalai National Park in Tamil Nadu

- Red junglefowl, Gallus gallus
- Grey junglefowl, Gallus sonneratti
- Indian peafowl, Pavo cristatus

== Geese and ducks ==
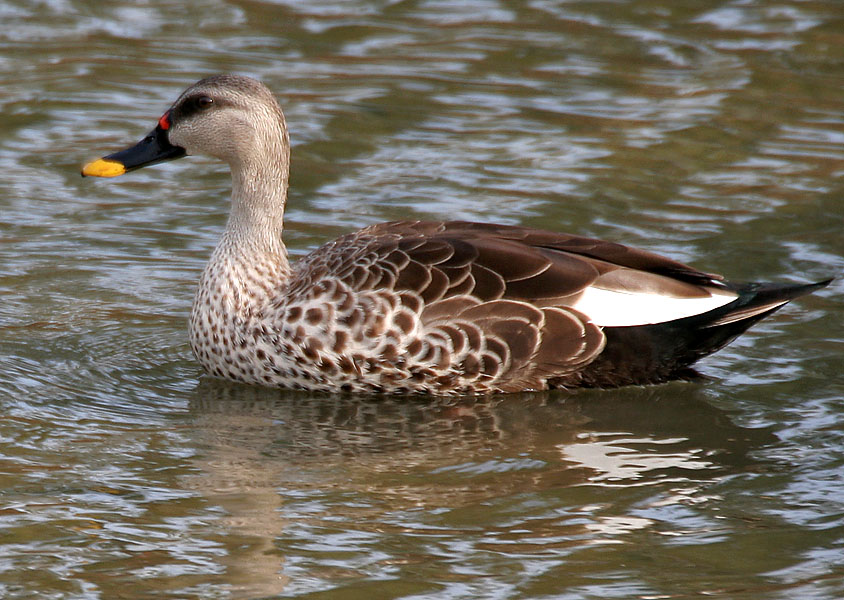
Indian spot-billed duck in Hyderabad

- Fulvous whistling duck, Dendrocygna bicolor
- Lesser whistling duck, Dendrocygna javanica
- Knob-billed duck, Sarkidiornis melanotus
- Pink-headed duck, Rhodonessa caryophyllacea (Historic)
- Cotton pygmy-goose, Nettapus coromandalianus
- Bar-headed goose, Anser indicus
- Ruddy shelduck, Tadorna ferruginea
- Common shelduck, Tadorna tadorna
- Gadwall, Mareca strepera
- Eurasian wigeon, Mareca penelope
- Mallard, Anas platyrhynchos
- Indian spot-billed duck, Anas poecilorhyncha
- Common teal, Anas crecca
- Northern pintail, Anas acuta
- Northern shoveler, Spatula clypeata
- Garganey, Spatula querquedula
- Red-crested pochard, Rhodonessa rufina
- Common pochard, Aythya ferina
- Ferruginous pochard, Aythya nyroca
- Tufted duck, Aythya fuligula

== Woodpeckers ==
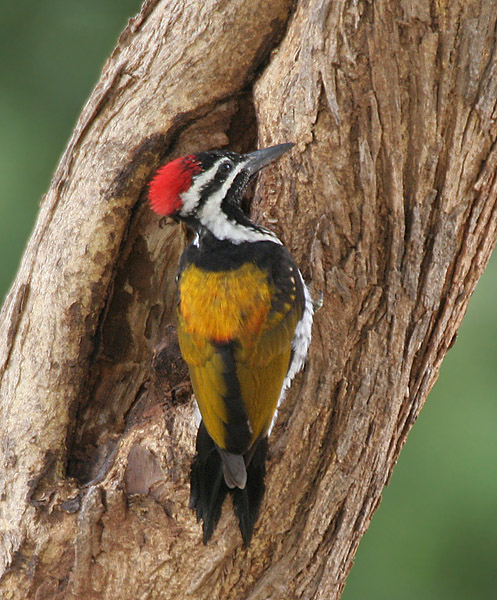
Black-rumped flameback in Hyderabad

- Eurasian wryneck, Jynx torquilla
- Speckled piculet, Picumnus innominatus
- Brown-capped pygmy woodpecker, Dendrocopos nanus
- Fulvous-breasted woodpecker, Dendrocopos macei (northern Eastern Ghats)
- Yellow-crowned woodpecker, Dendrocopos mahrattenis
- Rufous woodpecker, Celeus brachyurus
- Heart-spotted woodpecker, Hemicircus canente
- White-bellied woodpecker, Dryocopus javensis
- Lesser yellownape, Picus chlorolophus
- Greater yellownape, Picus flavinucha
- Streak-throated woodpecker, Picus xanthopygaeus
- Common flameback, Dinopium javanese
- Black-rumped flameback, Dinopium benghalense
- Greater flameback, Chrysocolaptes lucidus
- White-naped woodpecker, Chrysocalptes festivus

== Barbets ==
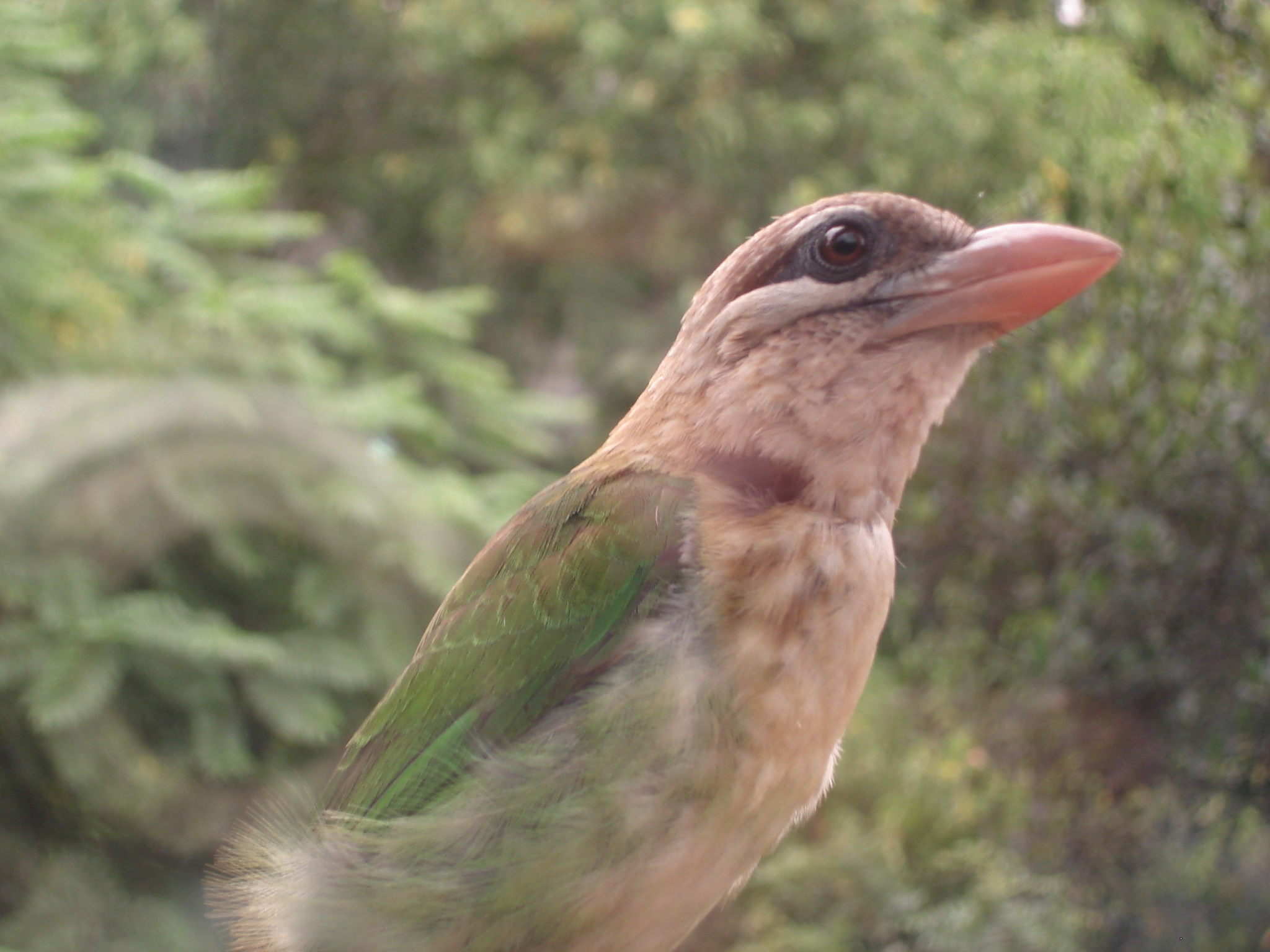
White-cheeked barbet in Bangalore

- Brown-headed barbet, Psilopogon zeylanicus
- White-cheeked barbet, Psilopogon viridis
- Malabar barbet, Psilopogon malabaricus
- Coppersmith barbet, Psilopogon haemacephalus

== Hornbills ==
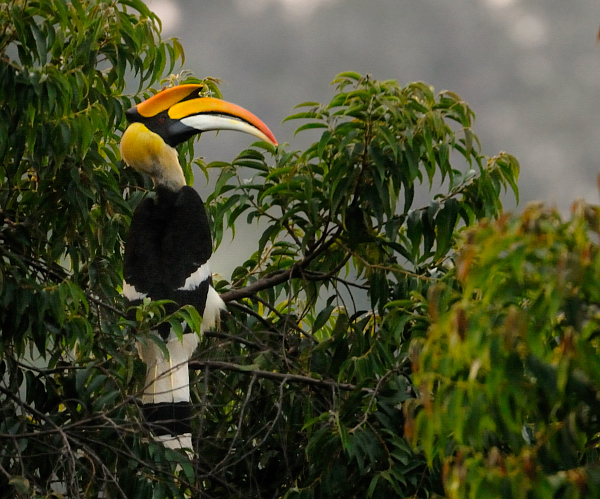
Great hornbill perched on a Mesua tree at Valparai, Tamil Nadu

- Malabar grey hornbill, Ocyceros griseus
- Indian grey hornbill, Ocyceros birostris
- Malabar pied hornbill, Anthracoceros coronatus
- Oriental pied hornbill, Anthracoceros albirostris
- Great hornbill, Buceros bicornis

== Common hoopoes, trogons and rollers ==
- Common hoopoe, Upupa epops
- Malabar trogon, Harpactes fasciatus
- European roller, Coracias garrulus
- Indian roller, Coracias benghalensis
- Dollarbird, Eurystomus orientalis

== Kingfishers ==
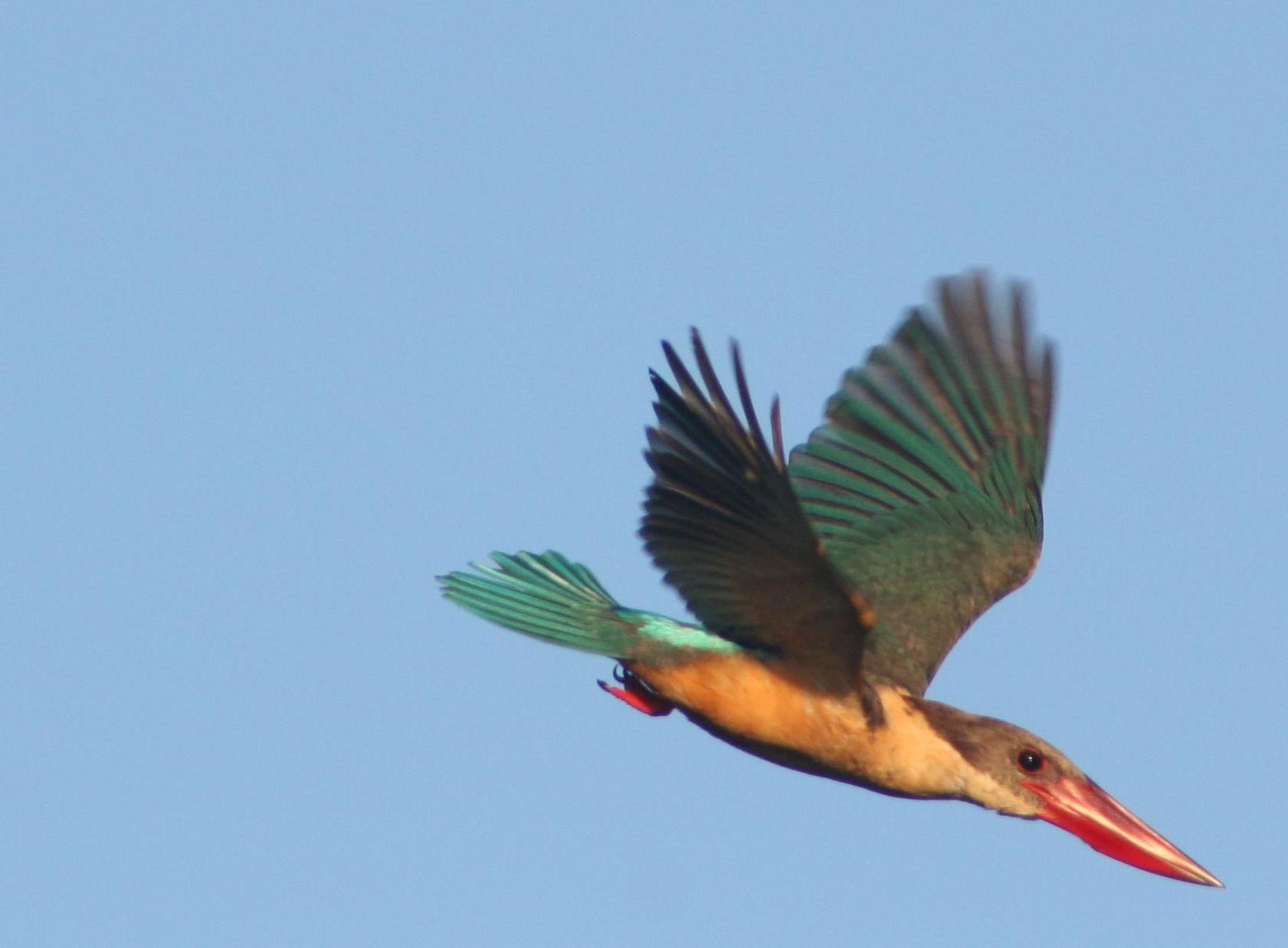
Stork-billed kingfisher in Kumarakom, Kerala

- Pied kingfisher, Ceryle rudis
- Common kingfisher, Alcedo atthis
- Blue-eared kingfisher, Alcedo meninting
- Oriental dwarf kingfisher, Ceyx erithacus
- Stork-billed kingfisher, Pelargopsis capensis
- White-throated kingfisher, Halcyon smyrnensis
- Black-capped kingfisher, Halcyon pileata
- Collared kingfisher, Todiramphus chloris

== Bee-eaters ==
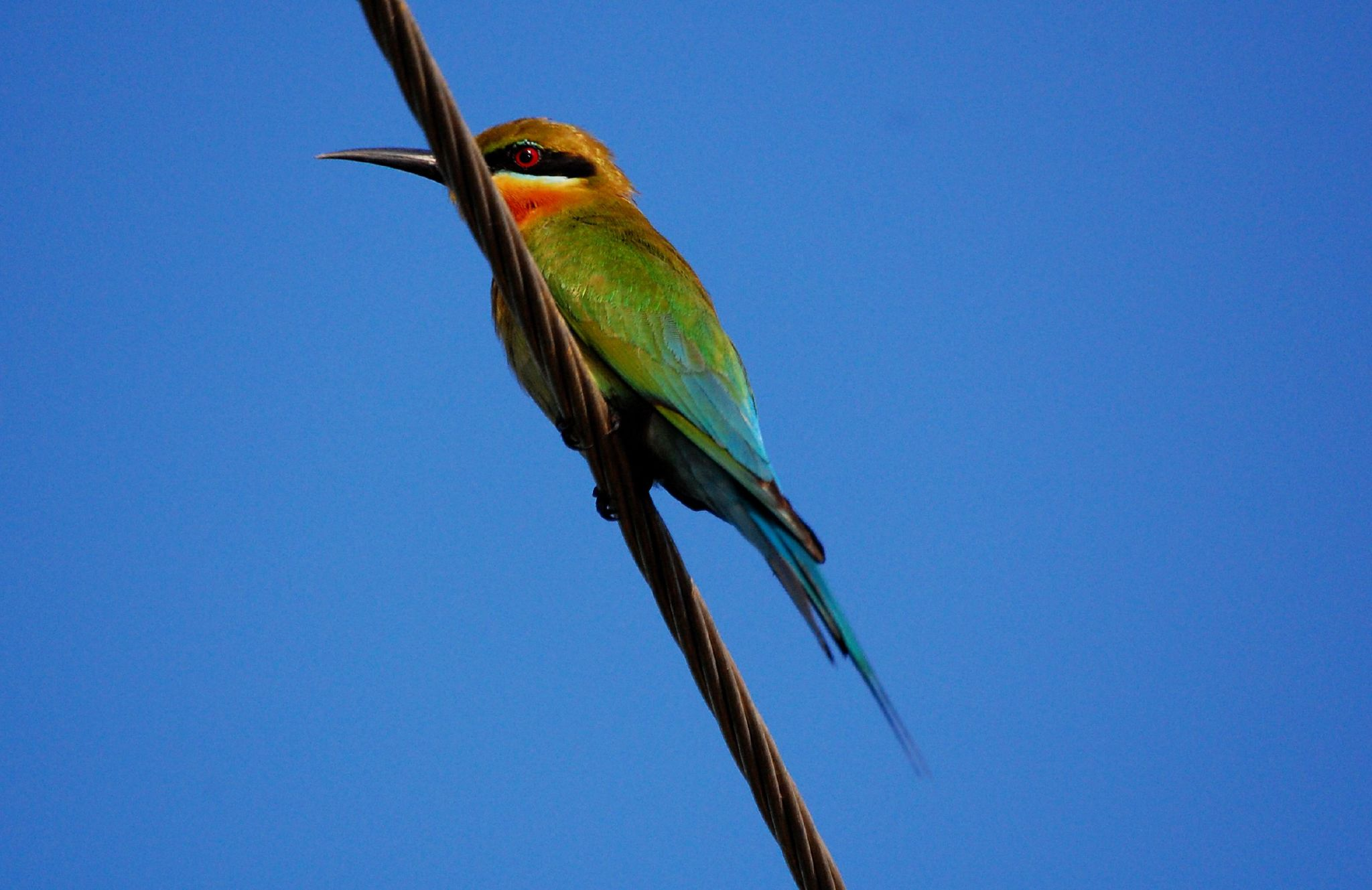
Blue-tailed bee-eater in Chalakudy, Kerala

- Blue-bearded bee-eater, Nyctyornis athertoni
- Green bee-eater, Merops orientalis
- Blue-cheeked bee-eater, Merops persicus
- Blue-tailed bee-eater, Merops philippinus
- European bee-eater, Merops apiaster
- Chestnut-headed bee-eater, Merops leschenaulti

== Cuckoos and malkohas ==
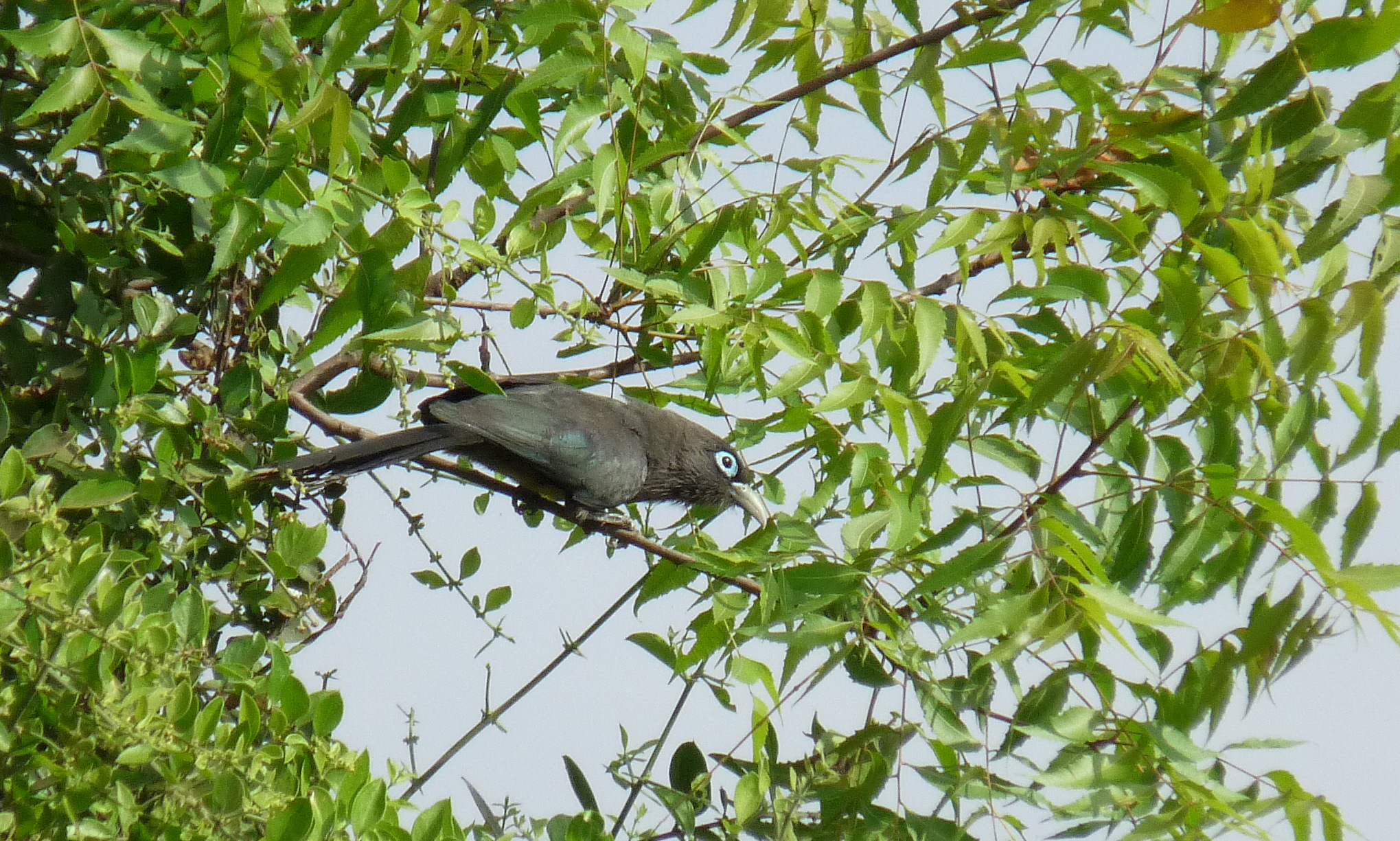
Blue-faced malkoha in Singanallur Lake, Coimbatore, Tamil Nadu

- Pied cuckoo
- Chestnut-winged cuckoo
- Large hawk-cuckoo
- Common hawk-cuckoo
- Indian cuckoo
- Eurasian cuckoo, Cuculus canorus
- Lesser cuckoo
- Banded bay cuckoo
- Grey-bellied cuckoo
- Drongo cuckoo
- Asian koel
- Green-billed malkoha
- Blue-faced malkoha
- Sirkeer malkoha

== Coucals, parrots and parakeets ==
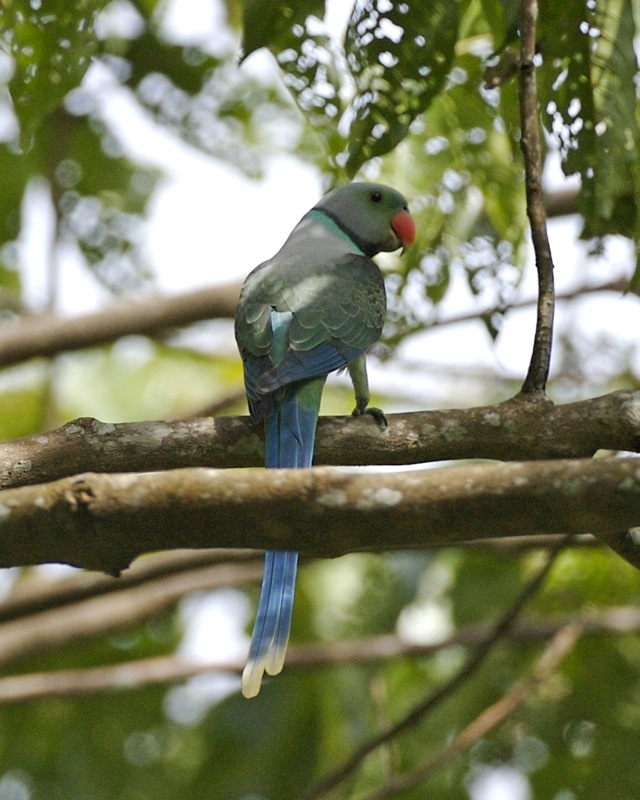
Malabar parakeet in Thattekad, Kerala

- Greater coucal
- Lesser coucal
- Vernal hanging parrot
- Alexandrine parakeet
- Rose-ringed parakeet
- Plum-headed parakeet
- Malabar parakeet

== Swifts ==
- Indian swiftlet
- White-rumped needletail
- Brown-backed needletail
- Asian palm swift
- Alpine swift
- Common swift
- Blyth's swift
- House swift
- Crested treeswift

== Owls ==
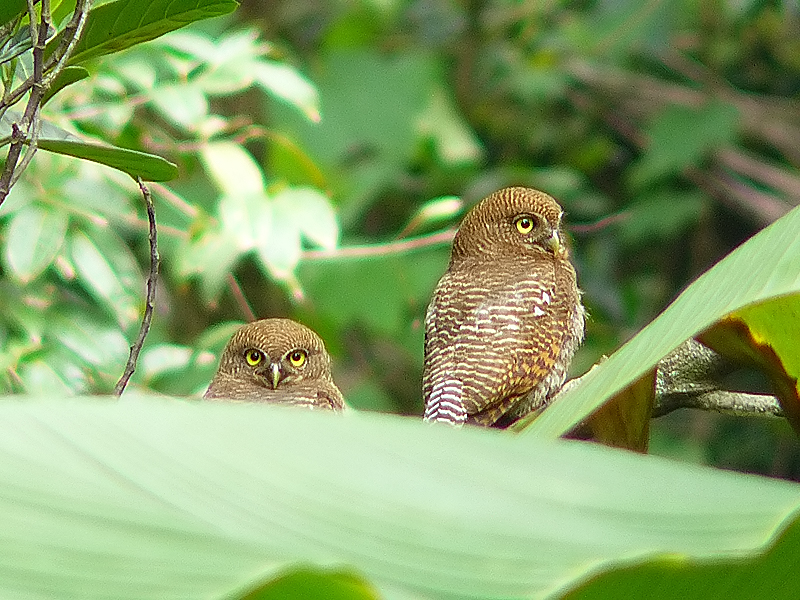
Jungle owlet in Kerala

- Barn owl
- Grass owl
- Oriental bay owl
- Pallid scops owl
- Oriental scops owl
- Collared scops owl
- Jungle owlet
- Spotted owlet
- Forest owlet
- Eurasian eagle owl
- Spot-bellied eagle owl
- Dusky eagle owl
- Brown fish owl
- Mottled wood owl
- Brown wood owl
- Brown hawk-owl
- Short-eared owl

== Frogmouth and nightjars ==
- Sri Lanka frogmouth
- Great eared nightjar
- Grey nightjar
- Large-tailed nightjar
- Jerdon's nightjar
- Indian nightjar
- Savanna nightjar

== Pigeons and doves ==
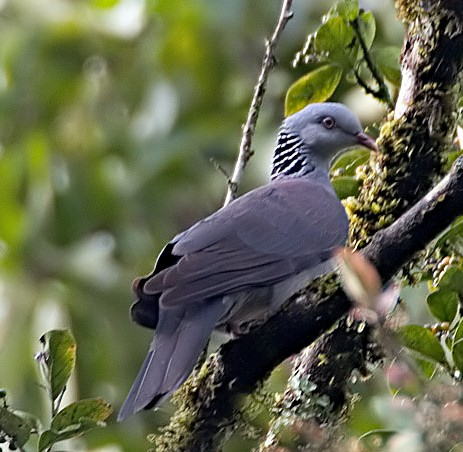
Nilgiri wood pigeon

- Rock dove
- Nilgiri wood pigeon
- Pale-capped pigeon
- Oriental turtle dove
- Laughing dove
- Spotted dove
- Red collared dove
- Eurasian collared dove
- Emerald dove
- Orange-breasted green pigeon
- Grey-fronted green pigeon
- Yellow-footed green pigeon
- Green imperial pigeon
- Mountain imperial pigeon

== Bustards and cranes ==
- Indian bustard
- Lesser florican
- Sarus crane
- Demoiselle crane
- Common crane

== Crakes and rails ==
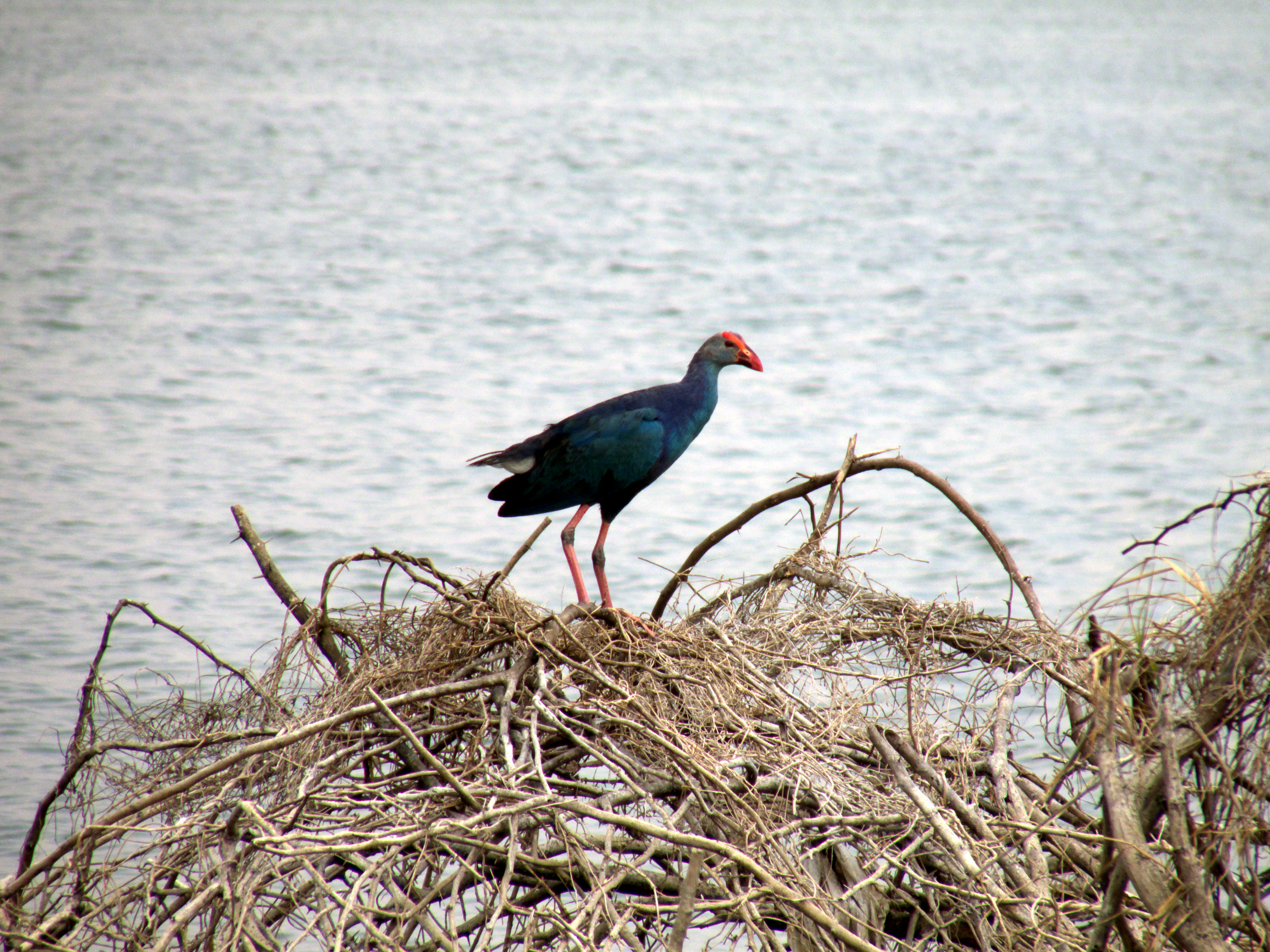
Grey-headed swamphen in Coimbatore, Tamil Nadu

- Slaty-legged crake
- Slaty-breasted rail
- Water rail
- Brown crake
- White-breasted waterhen

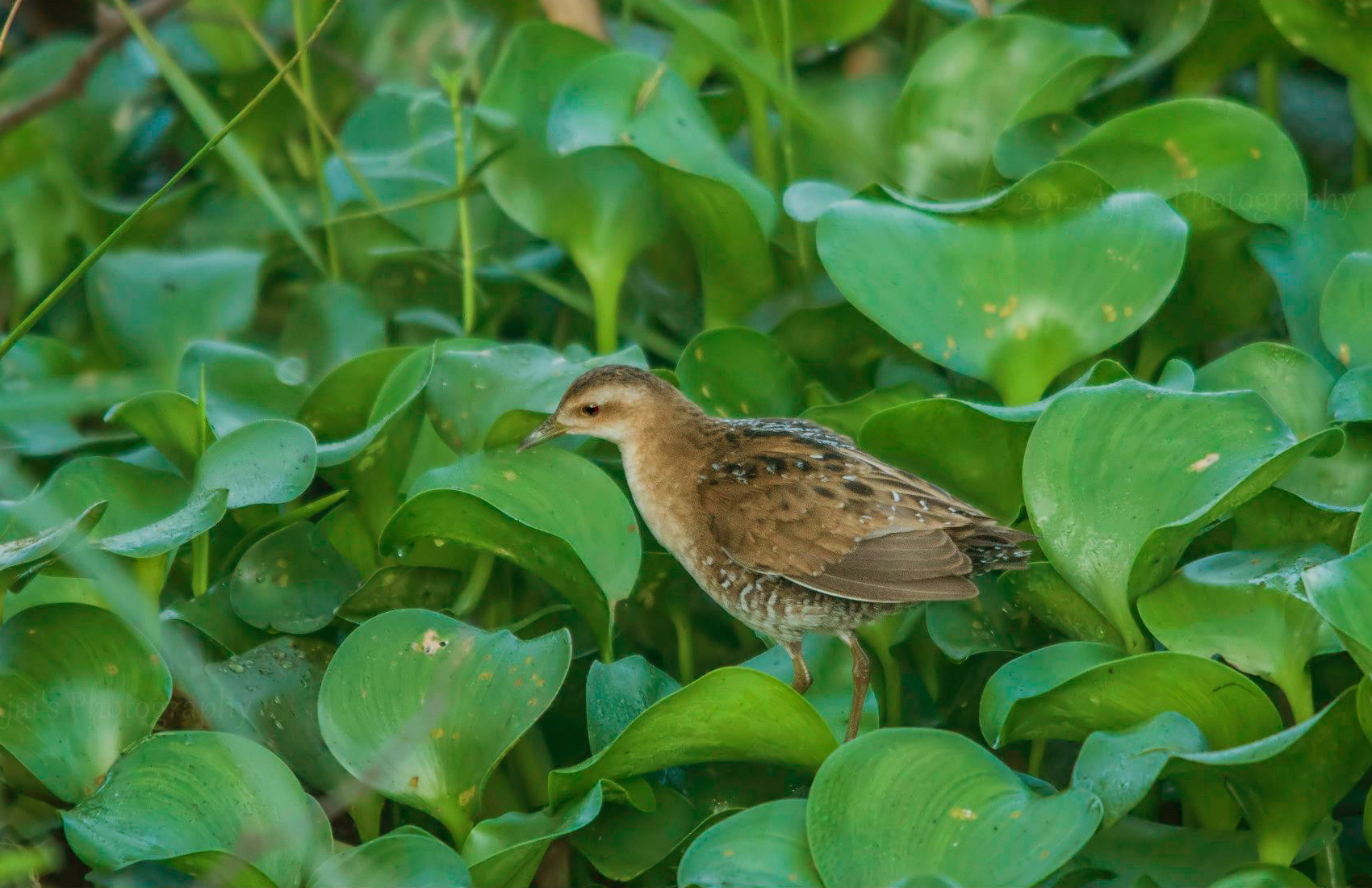
Baillon's crake, Coimbatore, Tamil Nadu

- Baillon's crake
- Ruddy-breasted crake
- Spotted crake
- Watercock
- Grey-headed swamphen
- Common moorhen
- Common coot

== Sandgrouse ==
- Chestnut-bellied sandgrouse
- Painted sandgrouse

== Woodcocks, snipes and painted-snipes ==
- Eurasian woodcock
- Wood snipe
- Pintail snipe
- Swinhoe's snipe
- Common snipe
- Jack snipe
- Greater painted-snipe

== Godwits, curlews, and Tringa sandpipers ==
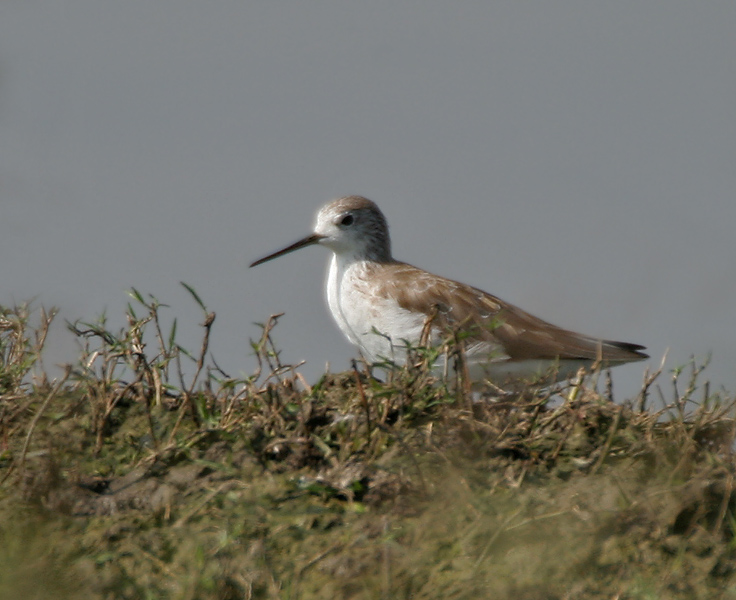
Marsh sandpiper in Hyderabad, Telangana

- Black-tailed godwit
- Bar-tailed godwit
- Whimbrel
- Eurasian curlew
- Spotted redshank
- Common redshank
- Marsh sandpiper
- Common greenshank
- Green sandpiper
- Wood sandpiper
- Terek sandpiper
- Common sandpiper
- Ruddy turnstone
- Asian dowitcher
- Great knot
- Red knot

== Sanderlings and stints ==
- Sanderling
- Little stint
- Red-necked stint
- Temminck's stint
- Long-toed stint
- Dunlin
- Curlew sandpiper
- Spoon-billed sandpiper
- Broad-billed sandpiper
- Ruff
- Red-necked phalarope

== Jacanas and large waders ==
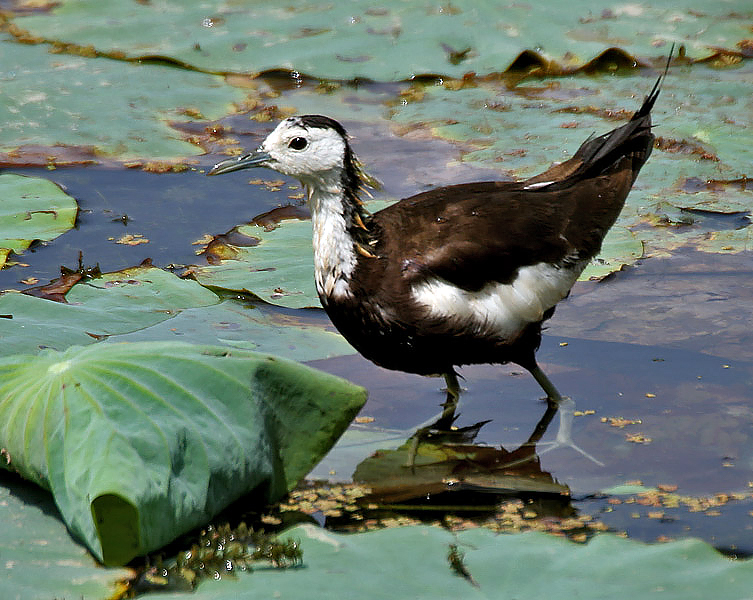
Pheasant-tailed jacana in Hyderabad in Telangana

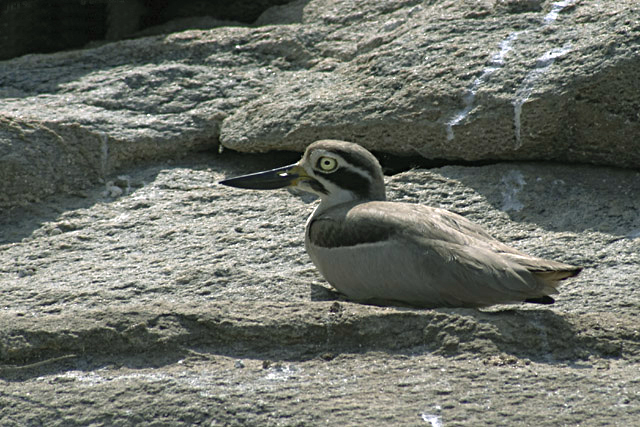
Great thick-knee near Mysore, Karnataka

- Pheasant-tailed jacana
- Bronze-winged jacana
- Eurasian thick-knee
- Great thick-knee
- Eurasian oystercatcher
- Black-winged stilt
- Pied avocet
- Crab-plover

== Plovers ==
- Pacific golden plover
- Grey plover
- Common ringed plover
- Little ringed plover
- Kentish plover
- Lesser sand plover
- Greater sand plover

== Lapwings, coursers and pratincoles ==
- Yellow-wattled lapwing
- River lapwing
- Red-wattled lapwing
- Sociable lapwing
- White-tailed lapwing
- Grey-headed lapwing
- Jerdon's courser
- Indian courser
- Oriental pratincole
- Small pratincole

== Skuas ==
- Pomarine skua
- Arctic skua

== Gulls, terns and noddies ==
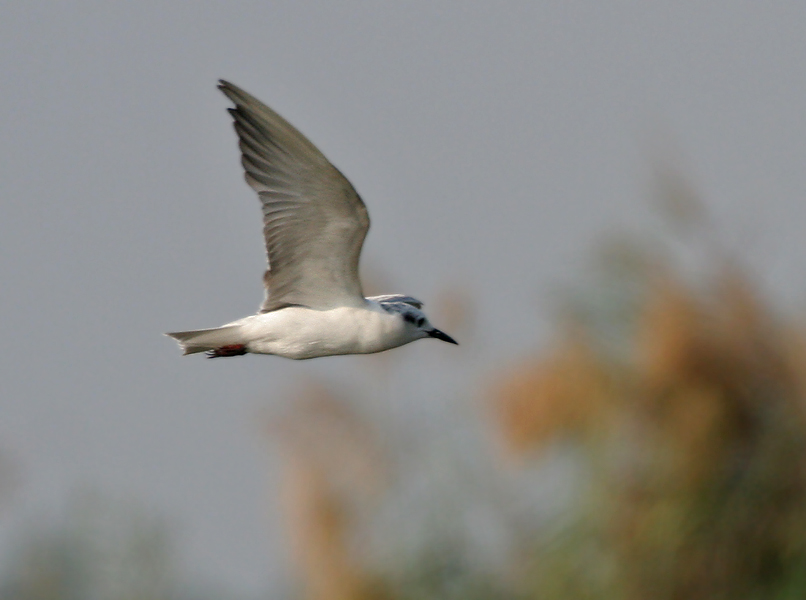
Whiskered tern in Kolleru Lake, Andhra Pradesh

- Sooty gull
- Heuglin's gull
- Caspian gull
- Pallas's gull
- Brown-headed gull
- Black-headed gull
- Slender-billed gull
- Indian skimmer
- Gull-billed tern
- Caspian tern
- River tern
- Lesser crested tern
- Great crested tern
- Sandwich tern
- Roseate tern
- Black-naped tern
- Common tern
- Little tern
- Saunders's tern
- White-cheeked tern
- Black-bellied tern
- White tern
- Bridled tern
- Sooty tern
- Whiskered tern
- White-winged tern
- Brown noddy
- Lesser noddy

== Osprey ==
- Osprey

== Kites and bazas ==
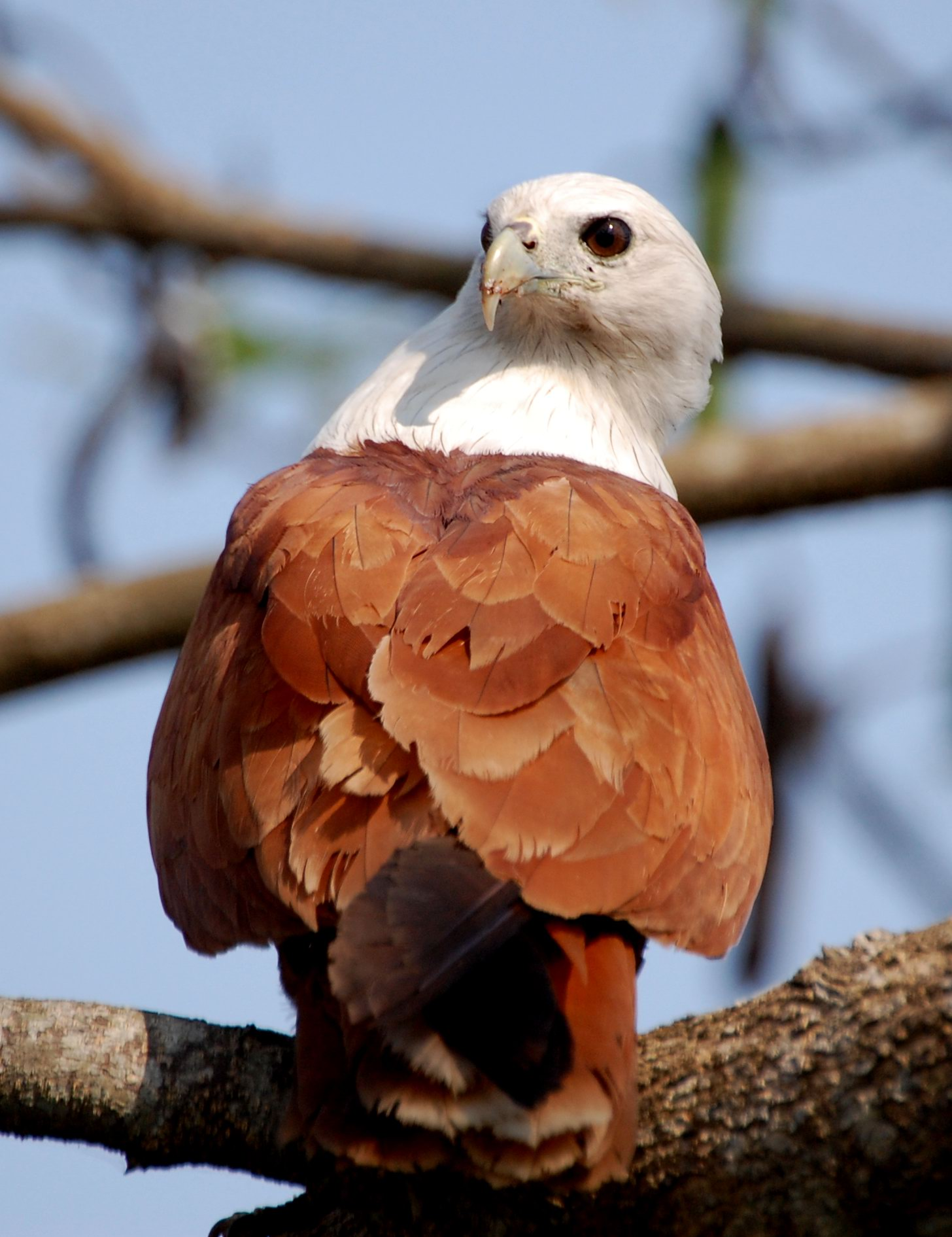
Brahminy kite in Chalakudy, Kerala

- Jerdon's baza
- Black baza
- Black-winged kite
- Black kite
- Brahminy kite
- Crested honey buzzard

== Sea and fish eagles ==
- White-bellied sea eagle
- Pallas's fish eagle
- Grey-headed fish eagle

== Vultures ==
- Egyptian vulture
- White-rumped vulture
- Indian vulture
- Griffon vulture
- Red-headed vulture

== Eagles ==
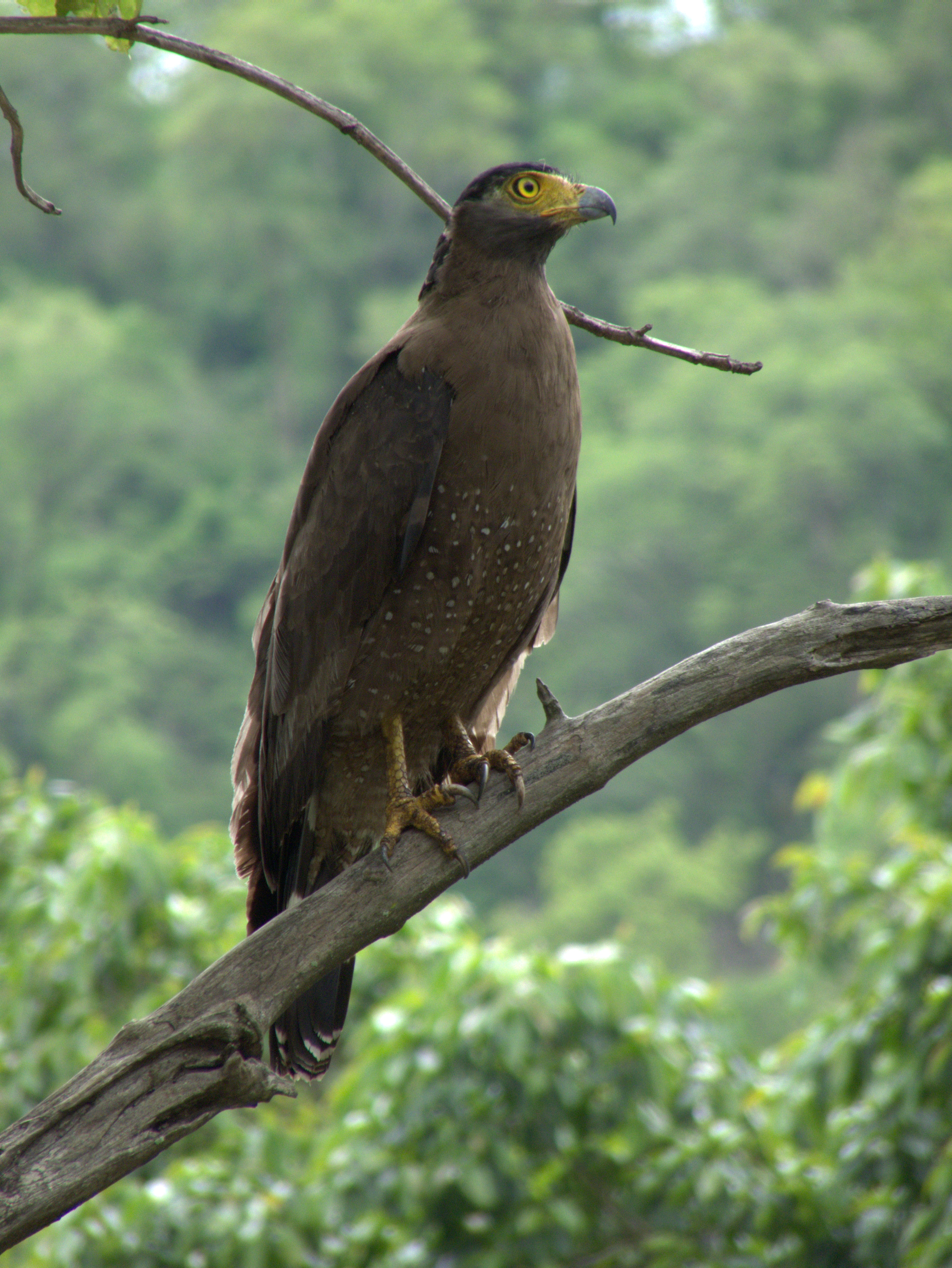
Crested serpent eagle subspecies melanotis in Anamalai Tiger Reserve in Tamil Nadu

- Black eagle
- Short-toed snake eagle
- Crested serpent eagle
- Indian spotted eagle
- Greater spotted eagle
- Tawny eagle
- Steppe eagle
- Bonelli's eagle
- Booted eagle
- Rufous-bellied eagle
- Changeable hawk-eagle
- Mountain hawk-eagle

== Harriers ==
- Eurasian marsh harrier
- Pied harrier
- Hen harrier
- Pallid harrier
- Montagu's harrier

== Accipiters ==
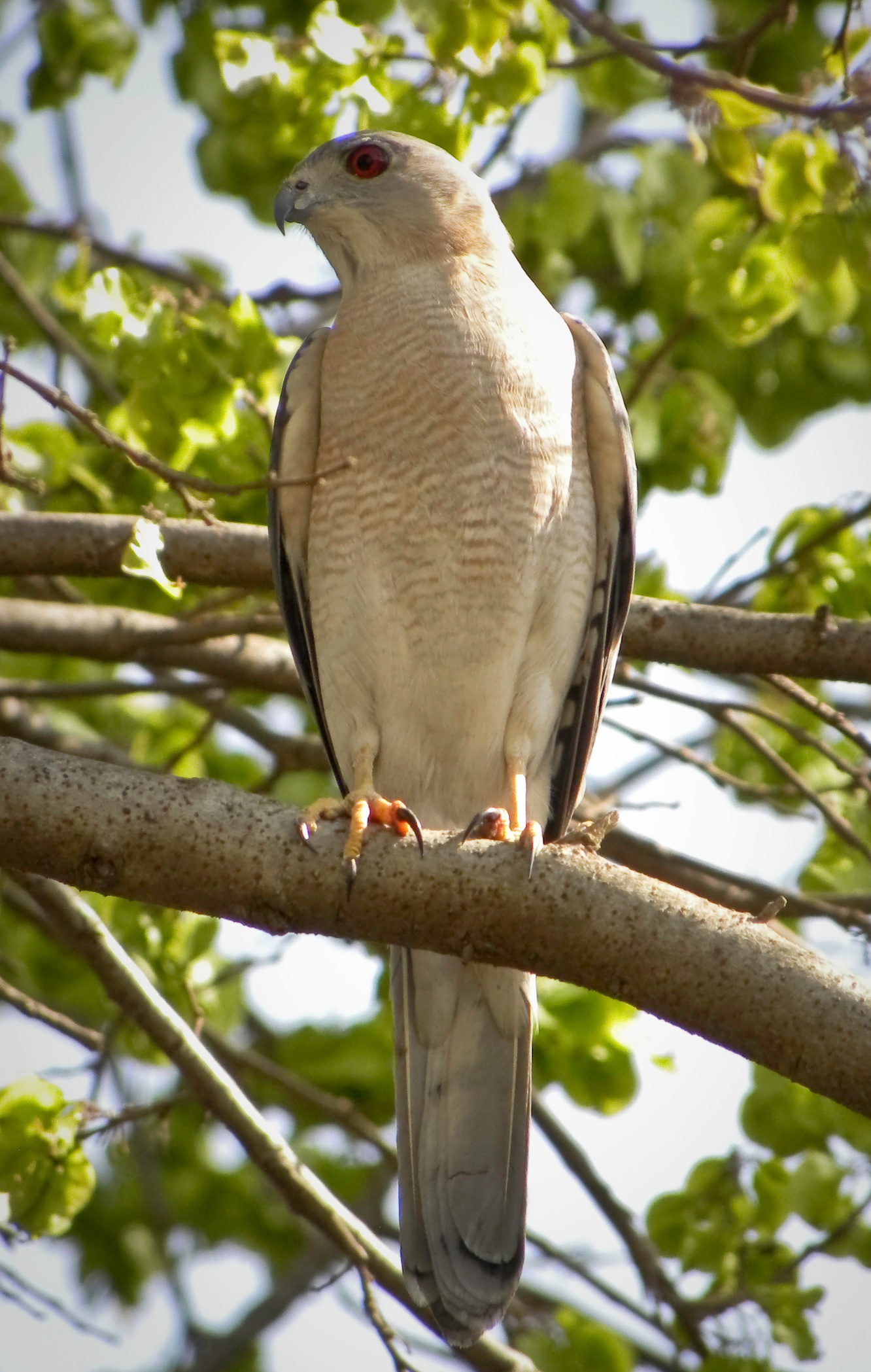
Shikra in Pune, Maharashtra

- Crested goshawk
- Shikra
- Besra
- Eurasian sparrowhawk

== Buzzards ==
- White-eyed buzzard
- Common buzzard
- Long-legged buzzard

== Falcons ==
- Lesser kestrel
- Common kestrel
- Red-necked falcon
- Amur falcon
- Eurasian hobby
- Oriental hobby
- Laggar falcon
- Peregrine falcon

== Grebes, cormorants and darter ==
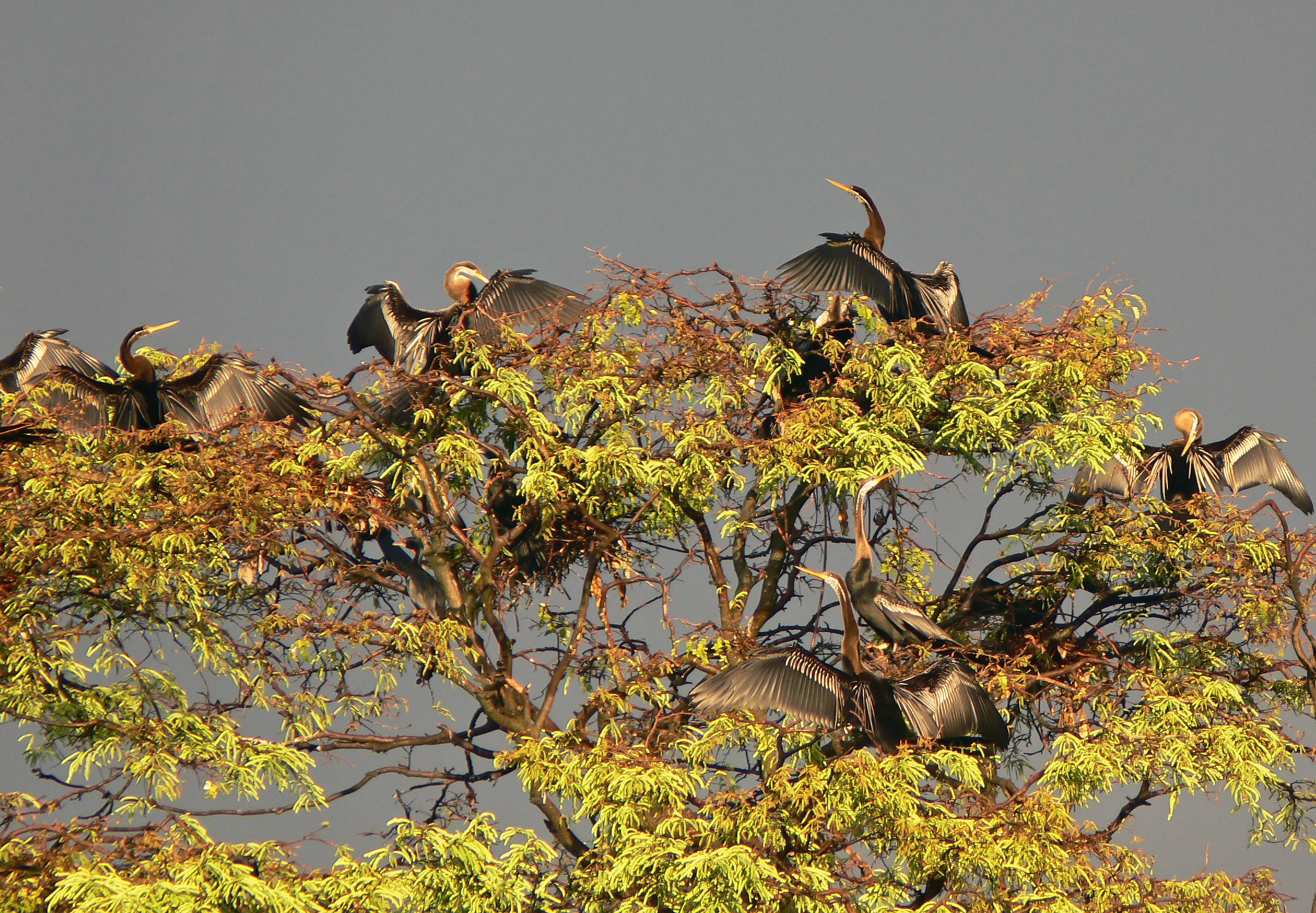
Oriental darters nesting at Kalletumkara Kerala

- Little grebe
- Little cormorant
- Indian cormorant
- Great cormorant
- Darter

== Tropicbirds and boobies ==
- Red-billed tropicbird
- White-tailed tropicbird
- Masked booby
- Brown booby
- Red-footed booby

== Egrets ==
- Little egret
- Western reef egret
- Eastern great egret
- Intermediate egret
- Cattle egret

== Herons ==
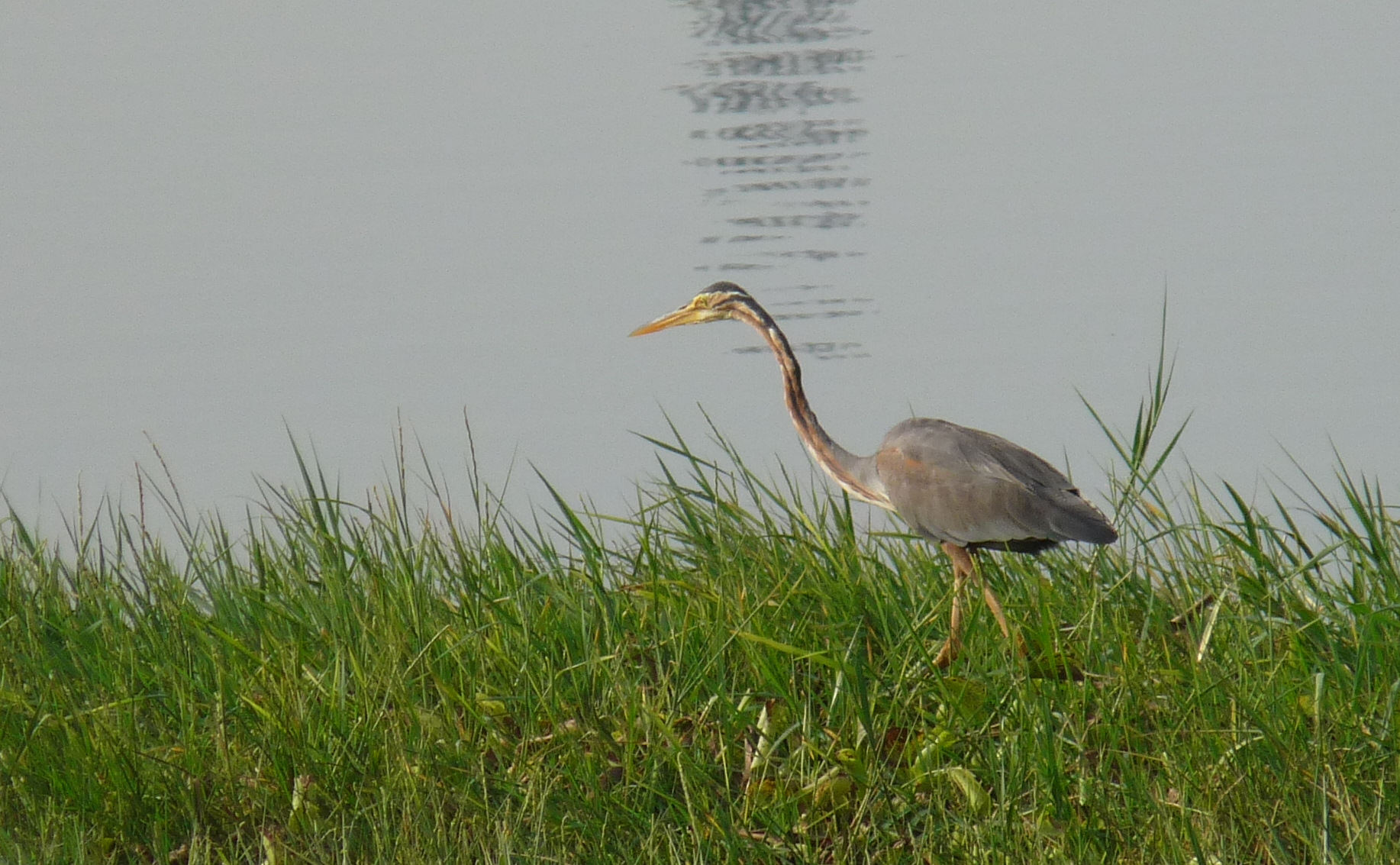
Purple heron in Sulur lake in Coimbatore, Tamil Nadu

- Grey heron
- Purple heron
- Indian pond heron
- Little heron
- Black-crowned night heron
- Malayan night heron

== Bitterns ==
- Yellow bittern
- Cinnamon bittern
- Black bittern
- Great bittern

== Flamingos ==
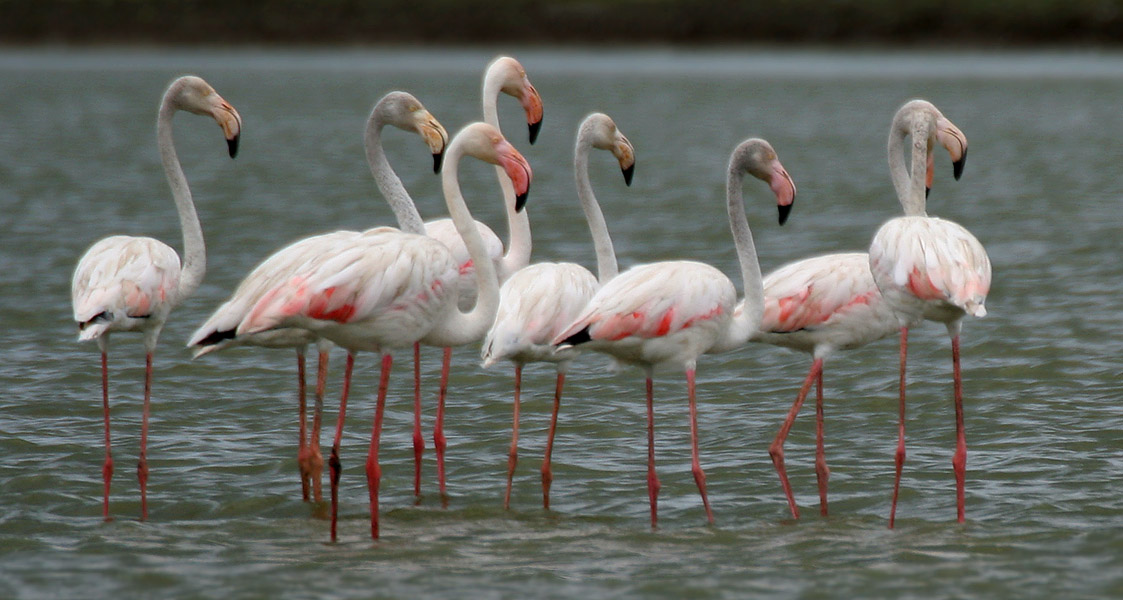
Greater flamingos at Pocharam lake in Telangana

- Greater flamingo
- Lesser flamingo

== Ibises and spoonbills ==
- Glossy ibis
- Black-headed ibis
- Black ibis
- Eurasian spoonbill

== Storks ==
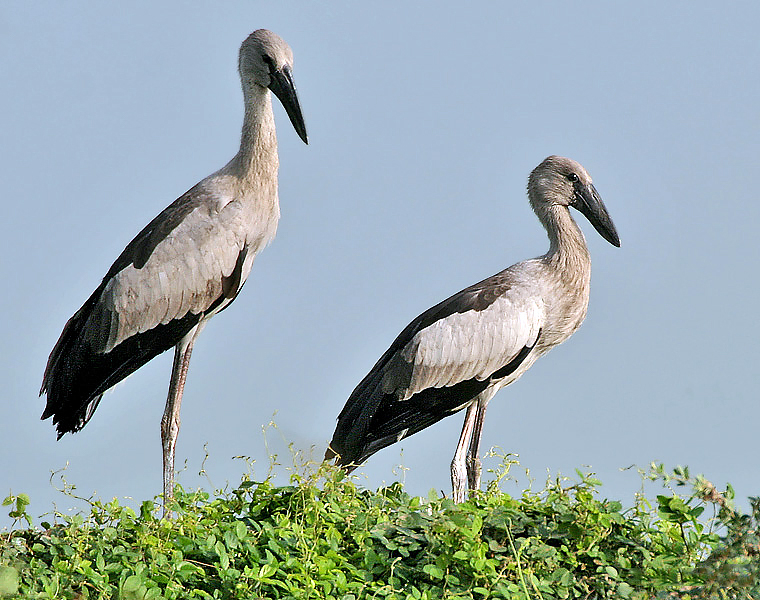
Asian openbill in Uppalapadu in Andhra Pradesh

- Painted stork
- Asian openbill
- Woolly-necked stork
- White stork
- Black stork
- Black-necked stork
- Lesser adjutant
- Greater adjutant

== Pelicans and frigatebirds ==
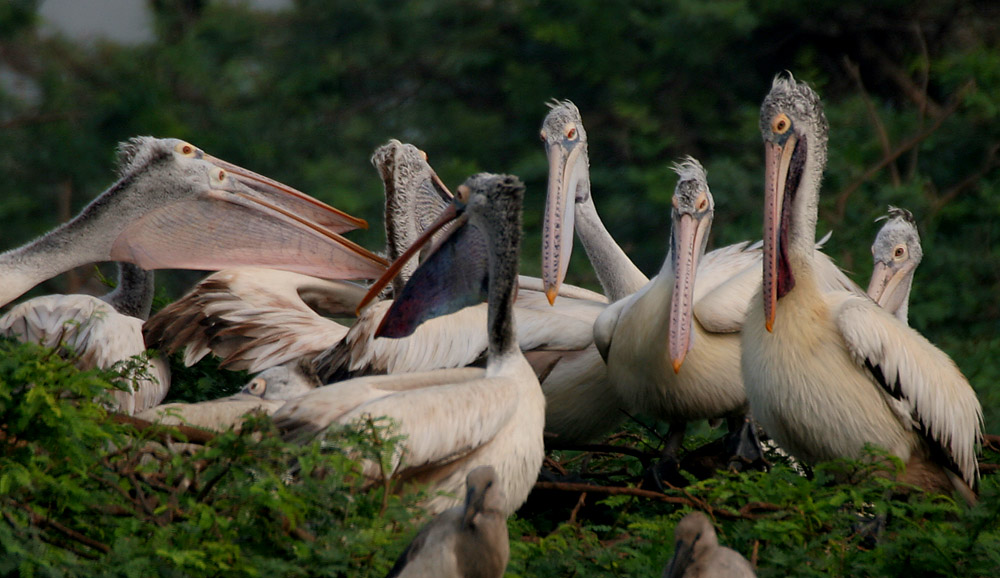
Spot-billed pelican in Uppalapadu in Andhra Pradesh

- Great white pelican
- Spot-billed pelican
- Great frigatebird
- Lesser frigatebird

== Shearwaters and storm petrels ==
- Wedge-tailed shearwater
- Flesh-footed shearwater
- Tropical shearwater
- Wilson's storm petrel
- Swinhoe's storm petrel

== Pitta, leafbirds, and shrikes ==
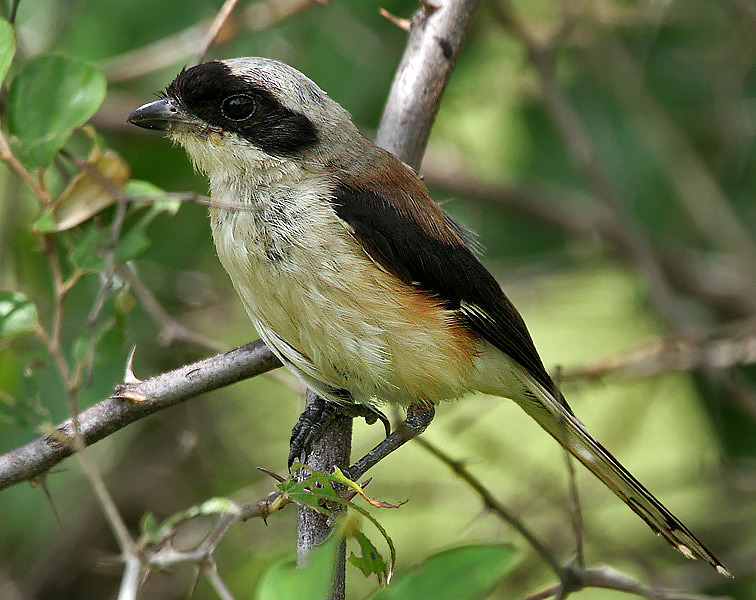
Bay-backed shrike in Ananthagiri hills in Telangana

- Indian pitta
- Asian fairy bluebird
- Blue-winged leafbird
- Golden-fronted leafbird
- Rufous-tailed shrike
- Brown shrike
- Bay-backed shrike
- Long-tailed shrike
- Great grey shrike

== Treepies, crows and orioles ==
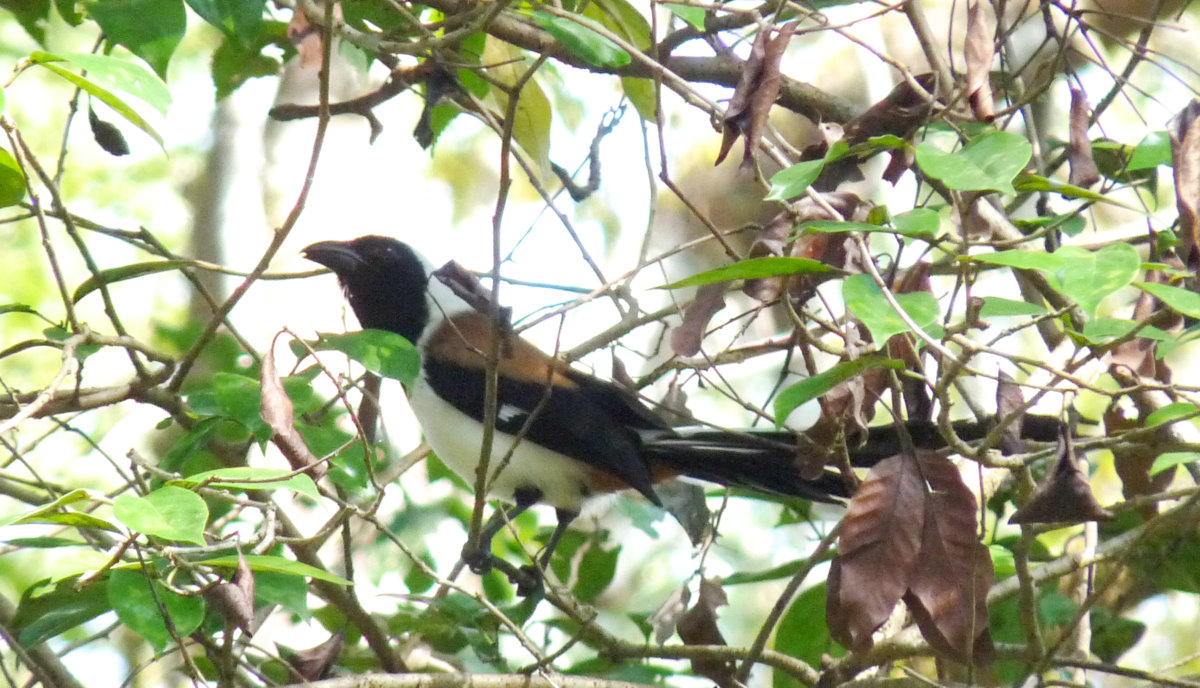
White-bellied treepie in Anamalai in Tamil Nadu

- Rufous treepie
- Grey treepie
- White-bellied treepie
- House crow
- Large-billed crow
- Indian golden oriole
- Black-naped oriole
- Black-hooded oriole

== Cuckooshrikes and minivets ==
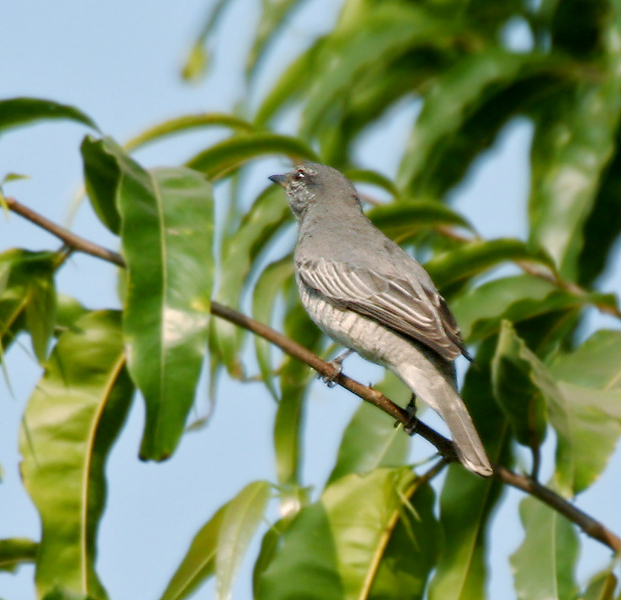
Female black-headed cuckooshrike in Kinnerasani Wildlife Sanctuary, Telangana

- Ashy woodswallow
- Large cuckooshrike
- Black-winged cuckooshrike
- Black-headed cuckooshrike
- Rosy minivet
- Ashy minivet
- Small minivet
- White-bellied minivet
- Scarlet minivet
- Bar-winged flycatcher-shrike

== Drongos ==
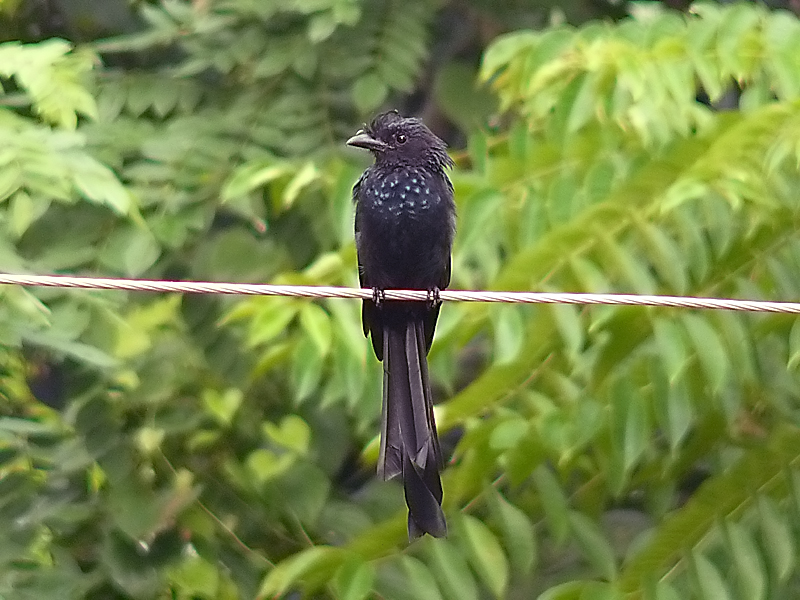
Greater racket-tailed drongo in Western Ghats in Kerala

- Black drongo
- Ashy drongo
- White-bellied drongo
- Bronzed drongo
- Spangled drongo
- Greater racket-tailed drongo

== Fantails and woodshrikes ==
- White-throated fantail
- White-browed fantail
- Black-naped monarch
- Indian paradise flycatcher
- Common iora
- Large woodshrike
- Common woodshrike

== Thrushes ==
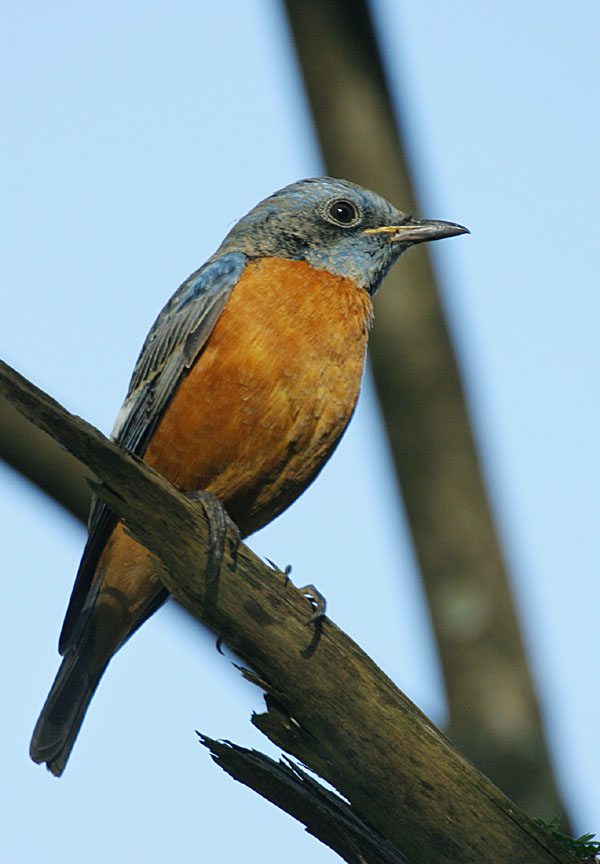
Blue-capped rock thrush in Nandi hills in Karnataka

- Blue-capped rock thrush
- Blue rock thrush
- Malabar whistling thrush
- Pied thrush
- Orange-headed thrush
- Scaly thrush
- Tickell's thrush
- Eurasian blackbird

== Flycatchers ==
- Asian brown flycatcher
- Rusty-tailed flycatcher
- Brown-breasted flycatcher
- Red-throated flycatcher
- Kashmir flycatcher
- Ultramarine flycatcher
- Black-and-orange flycatcher
- Yellow-rumped flycatcher
- Nilgiri flycatcher
- Verditer flycatcher

== Shortwing and chats ==
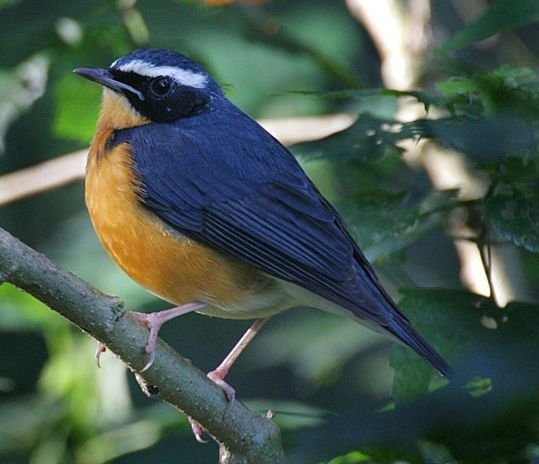
Indian blue robin in Nandi hills in Karnataka

- White-bellied shortwing
- Siberian rubythroat
- Bluethroat
- Indian blue robin
- Oriental magpie robin
- White-rumped shama
- Brown rock chat

== Starlings and mynas ==
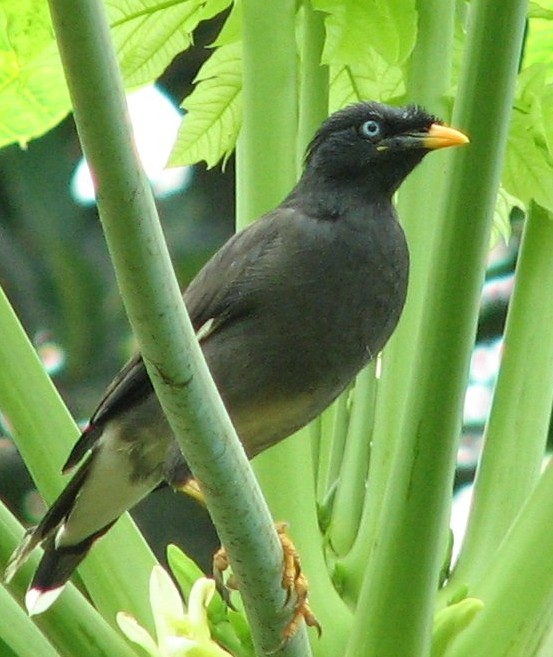
Jungle myna in Kottayam, Kerala

- Chestnut-tailed starling
- Brahminy starling
- Rosy starling
- Common starling
- Asian pied starling
- Common myna
- Bank myna
- Jungle myna
- Hill myna

== Nuthatches ==
- Chestnut-bellied nuthatch
- Velvet-fronted nuthatch

== Creepers ==
- Indian spotted creeper

== Tits ==
- Cinereous tit
- White-naped tit
- Himalayan black-lored tit

== Martins and swallows ==
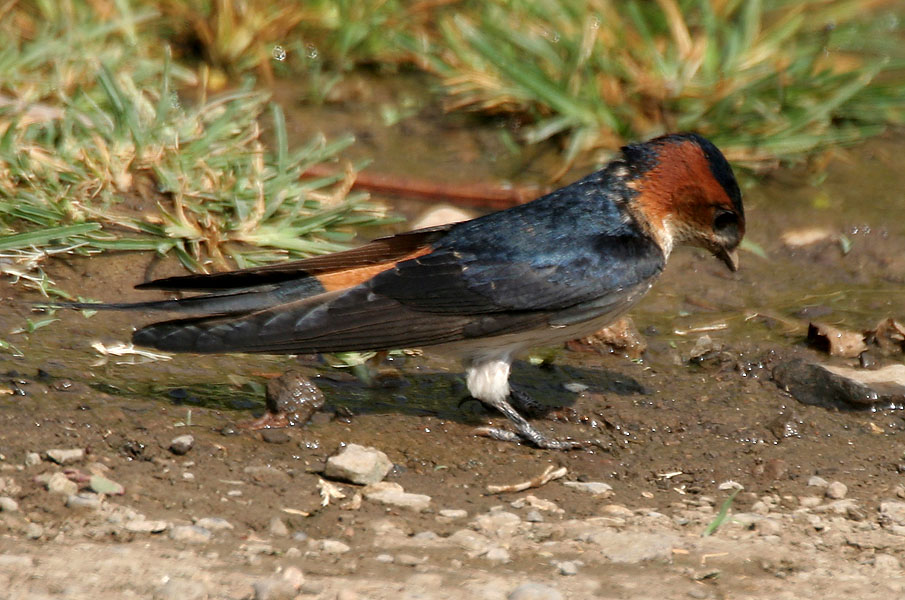
Eastern red-rumped swallow in Parli, Maharashtra

- Sand martin
- Pale martin
- Grey-throated martin
- Eurasian crag martin
- Dusky crag martin
- Barn swallow
- Pacific swallow
- Wire-tailed swallow
- Eastern red-rumped swallow
- Streak-throated swallow
- Northern house martin

== Bulbuls ==
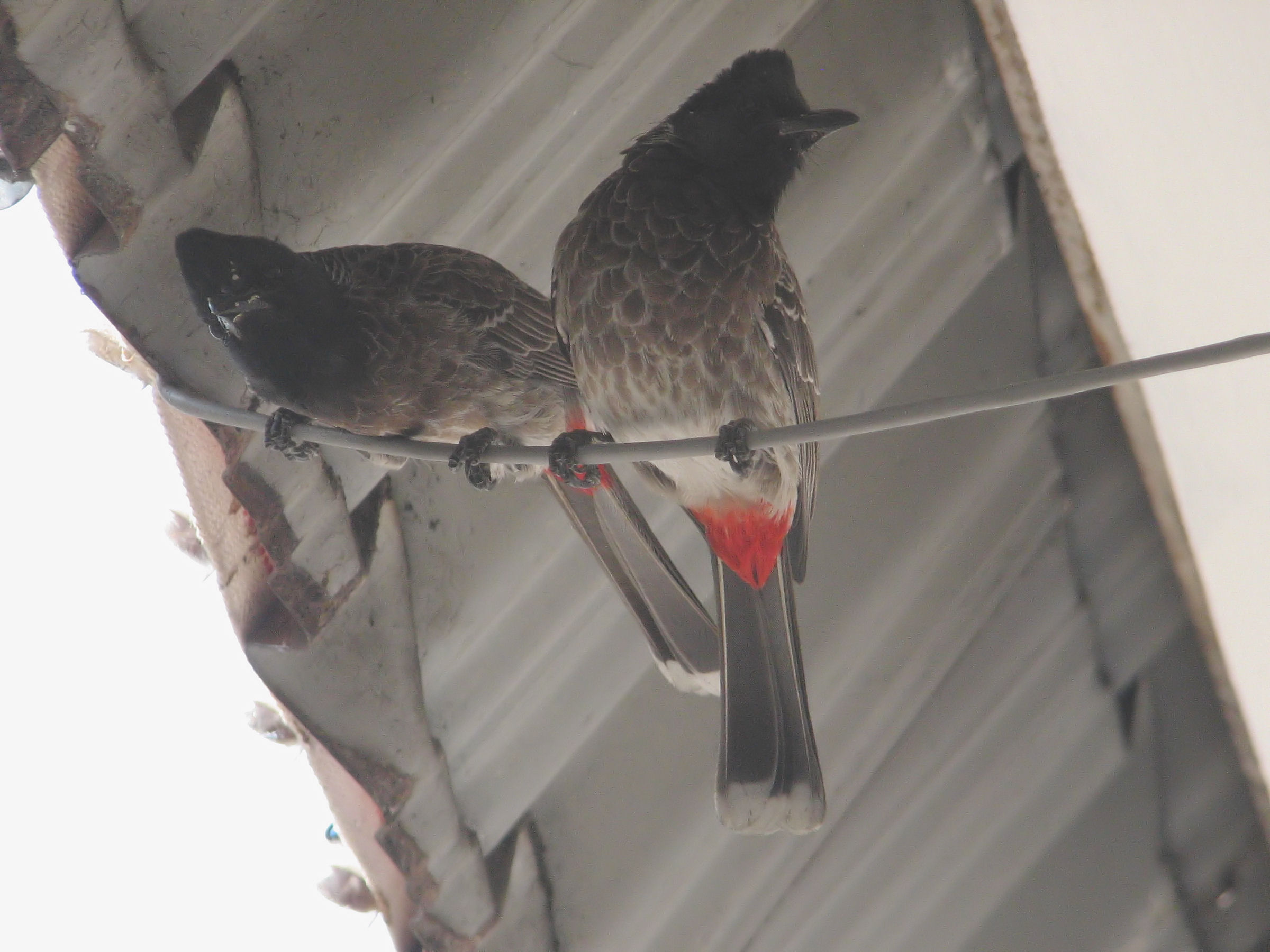
Red-vented bulbul in Ernakulam, Kerala

- Grey-headed bulbul
- Black-crested bulbul
- Red-whiskered bulbul
- Red-vented bulbul
- Yellow-throated bulbul
- White-browed bulbul
- Yellow-browed bulbul
- Square-tailed bulbul

== Cisticolas, prinias and white-eyes ==
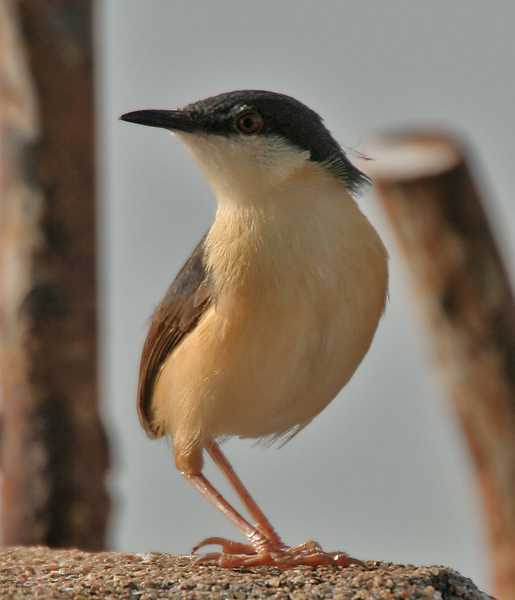
Ashy prinia in Hyderabad in Telangana

- Zitting cisticola
- Bright-headed cisticola
- Rufous-fronted prinia
- Rufescent prinia
- Grey-breasted prinia
- Jungle prinia
- Ashy prinia
- Plain prinia
- Indian white-eye

== Warblers ==
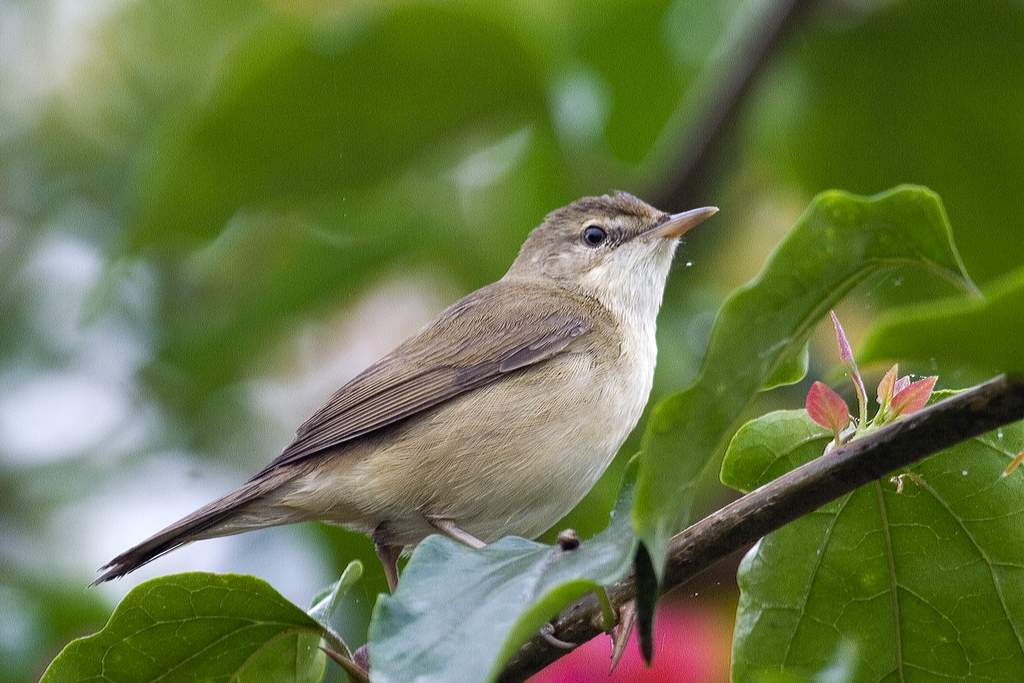
Blyth's reed warbler in Hebbal lake in Karnataka

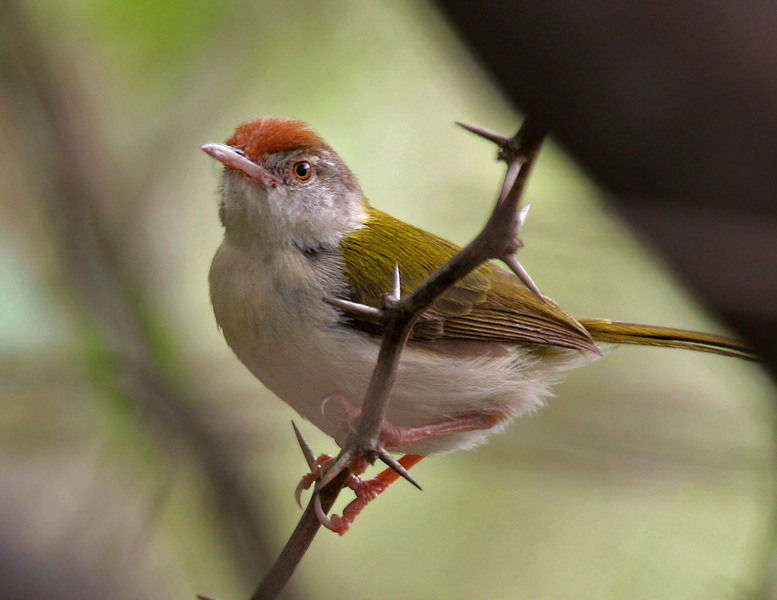
Common tailorbird in Hyderabad

- Pale-footed bush warbler
- Grasshopper warbler
- Paddyfield warbler
- Blyth's reed warbler
- Clamorous reed warbler
- Booted warbler
- Common tailorbird
- Common chiffchaff
- Dusky warbler
- Tickell's leaf warbler
- Sulphur-bellied warbler
- Hume's warbler
- Greenish warbler
- Large-billed leaf warbler
- Tytler's leaf warbler
- Western crowned warbler
- Green-crowned warbler
- Lesser whitethroat
- Orphean warbler

== Grassbirds ==
- Striated grassbird
- Bristled grassbird
- Broad-tailed grassbird

== Laughingthrushes ==
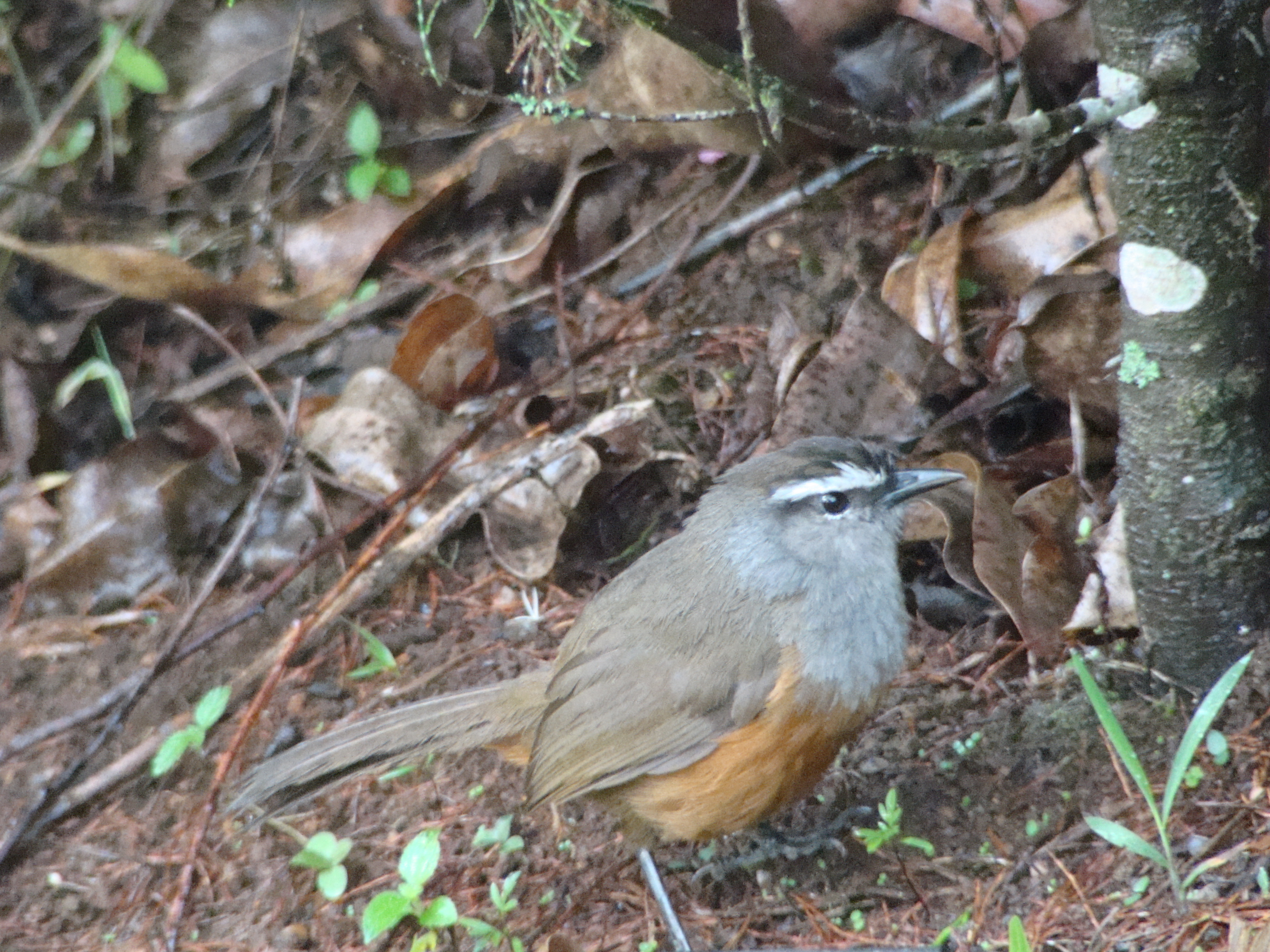
Palani laughingthrush in Munnar, Kerala

- Wynaad laughingthrush
- Nilgiri laughingthrush
- Banasura laughingthrush
- Palani laughingthrush
- Ashambu laughingthrush

== Babblers and fulvetta ==
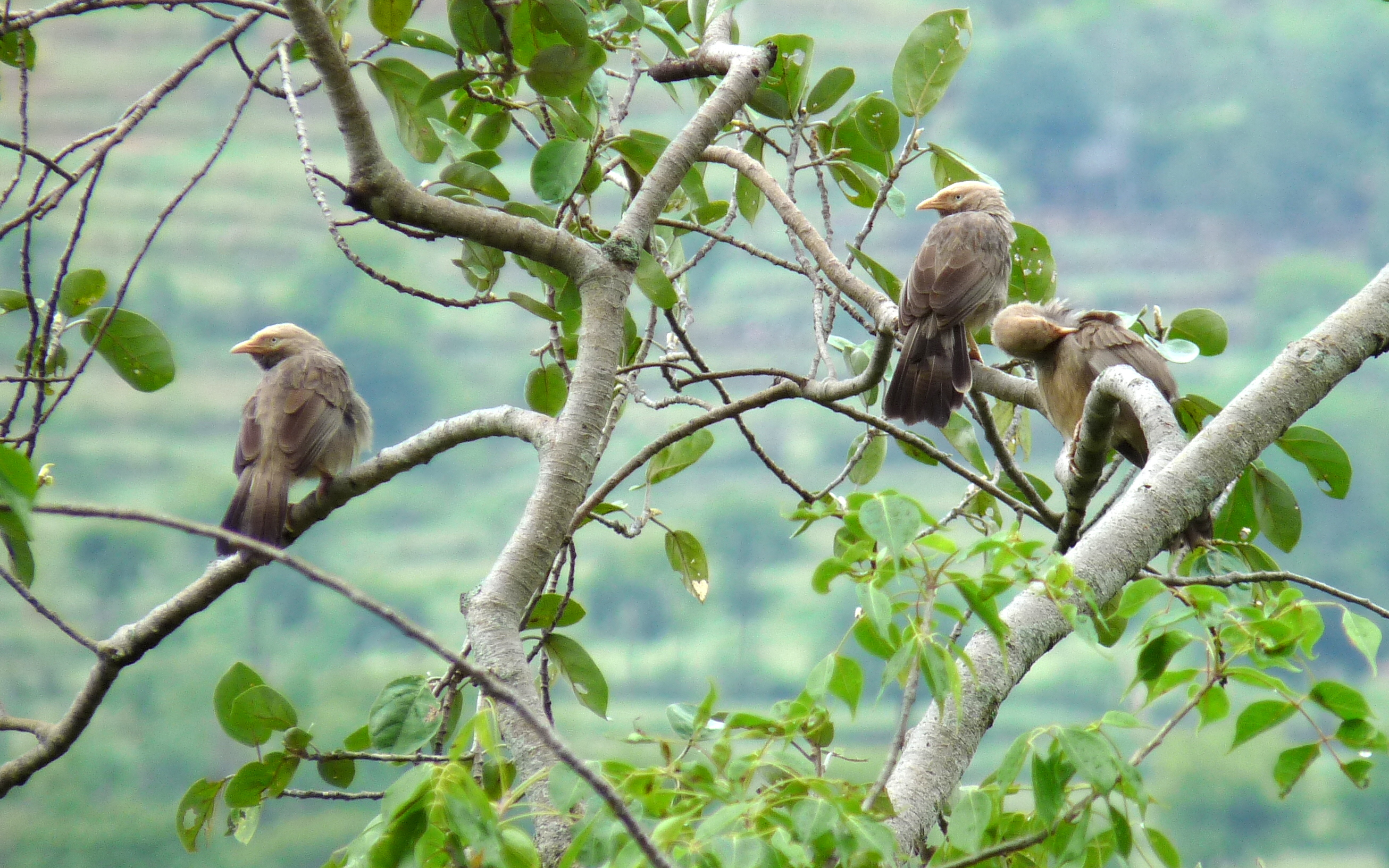
Yellow-billed babbler in Mulli, Tamil Nadu

- Abbott's babbler
- Puff-throated babbler
- Indian scimitar babbler
- Rufous-fronted babbler
- Tawny-bellied babbler
- Dark-fronted babbler
- Striped tit babbler
- Yellow-eyed babbler
- Common babbler
- Large grey babbler
- Rufous babbler
- Jungle babbler
- Yellow-billed babbler
- Brown-cheeked fulvetta

== Larks ==
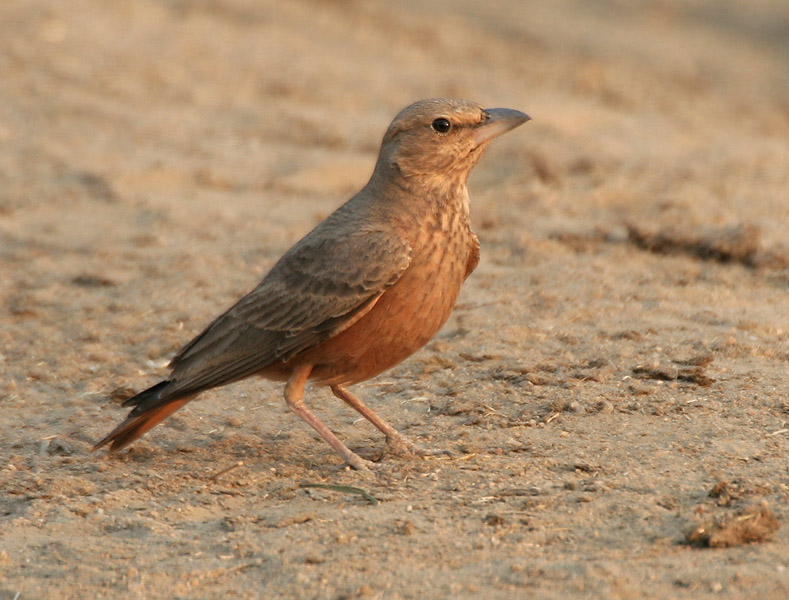
Rufous-tailed lark in Kawal Wildlife Sanctuary in Telangana

- Singing bushlark
- Indian bushlark
- Jerdon's bushlark
- Ashy-crowned sparrow lark
- Rufous-tailed lark
- Greater short-toed lark
- Crested lark
- Malabar lark
- Sykes's lark
- Oriental skylark

== Flowerpeckers ==
- Thick-billed flowerpecker
- Pale-billed flowerpecker
- Nilgiri flowerpecker

== Sunbirds and spiderhunter ==
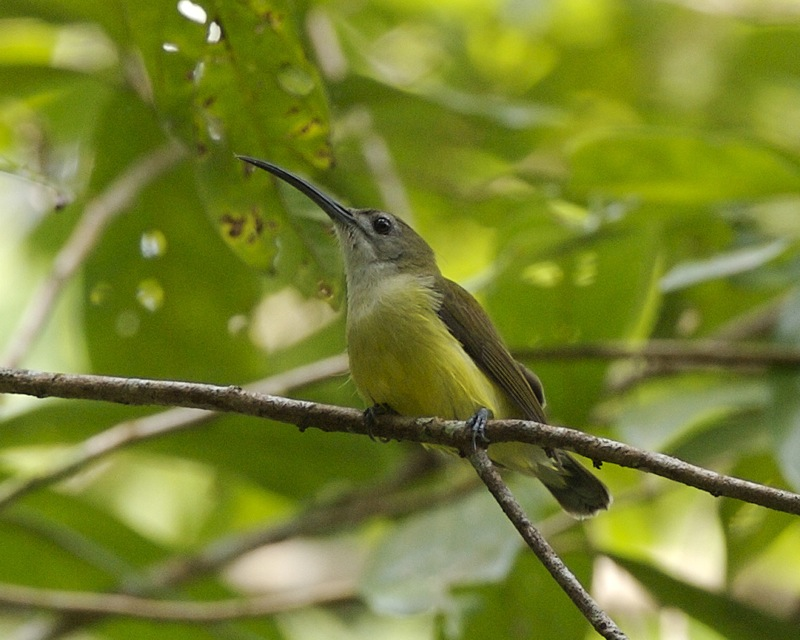
Little spiderhunter in Thattekad, Kerala

- Purple-rumped sunbird
- Crimson-backed sunbird
- Purple sunbird
- Loten's sunbird
- Crimson sunbird
- Ruby-cheeked sunbird
- Little spiderhunter
- Olive-backed sunbird

== Wagtails ==
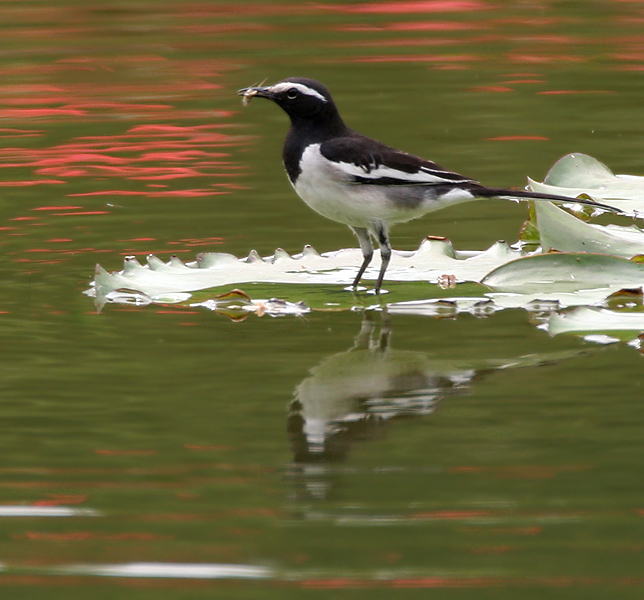
White-browed wagtail in Hyderabad, Telangana

- Forest wagtail
- White wagtail
- White-browed wagtail
- Citrine wagtail
- Yellow wagtail
- Grey wagtail

== Pipits ==
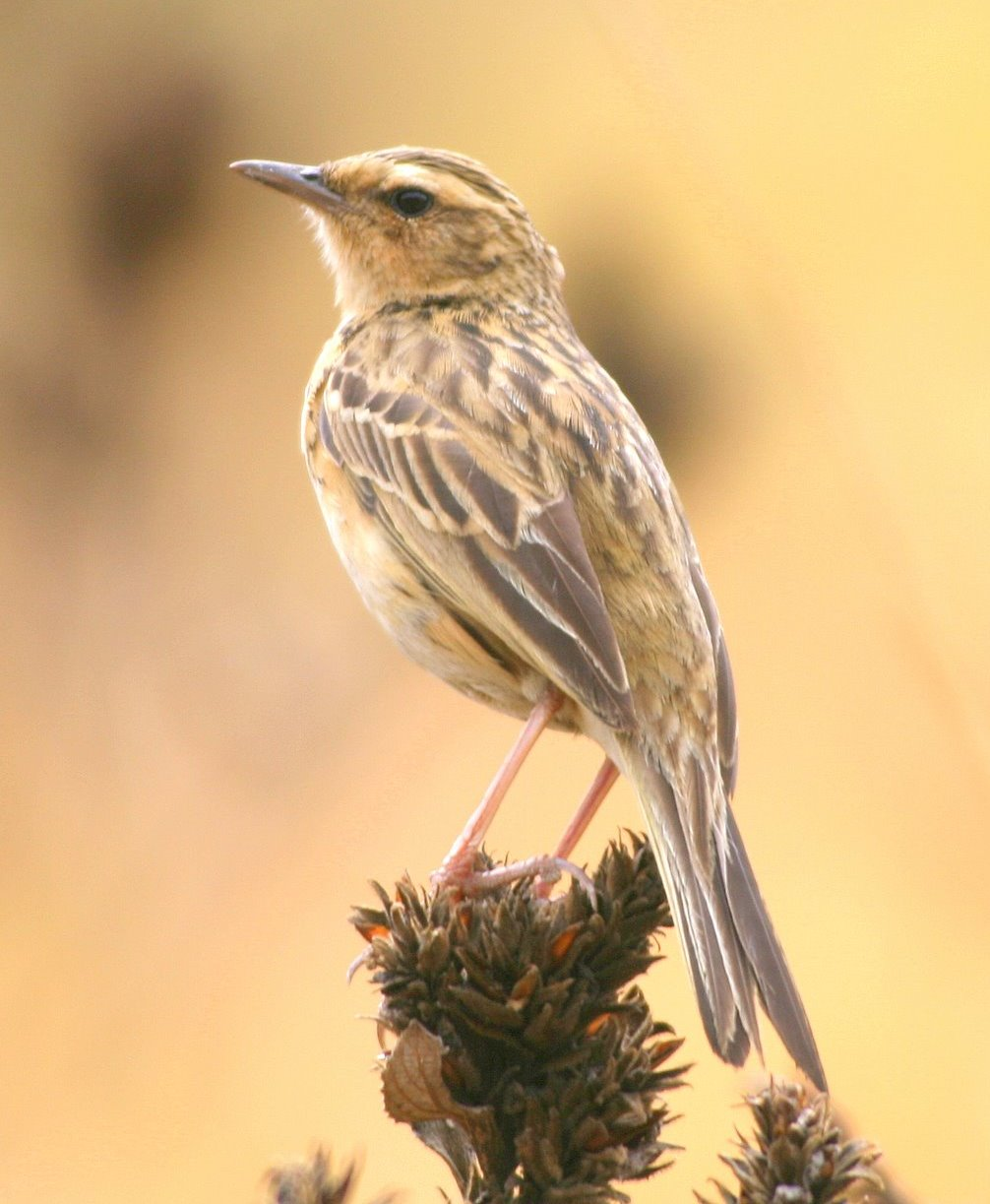
Nilgiri pipit

- Richard's pipit
- Paddyfield pipit
- Tawny pipit
- Blyth's pipit
- Long-billed pipit
- Tree pipit
- Olive-backed pipit
- Red-throated pipit
- Nilgiri pipit

== Sparrows ==
- House sparrow
- Eurasian tree sparrow
- Chestnut-shouldered petronia

== Weavers ==
- Black-breasted weaver
- Streaked weaver
- Baya weaver

== Avadavats ==
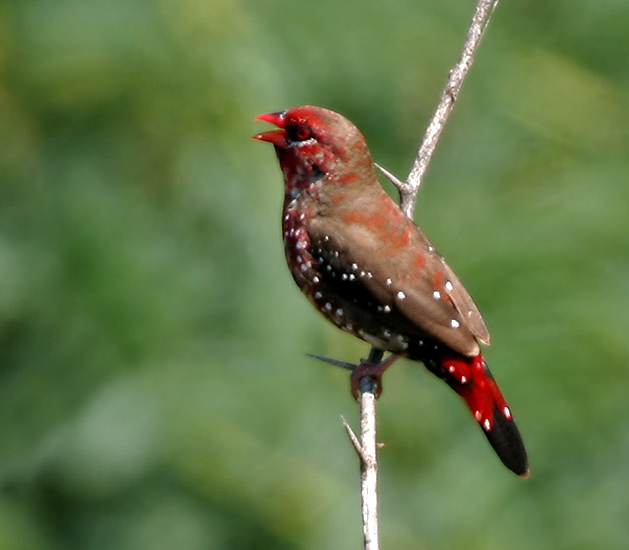
Red avadavat in Manjira Wildlife Sanctuary, Telangana

- Red avadavat
- Green avadavat

== Munias ==
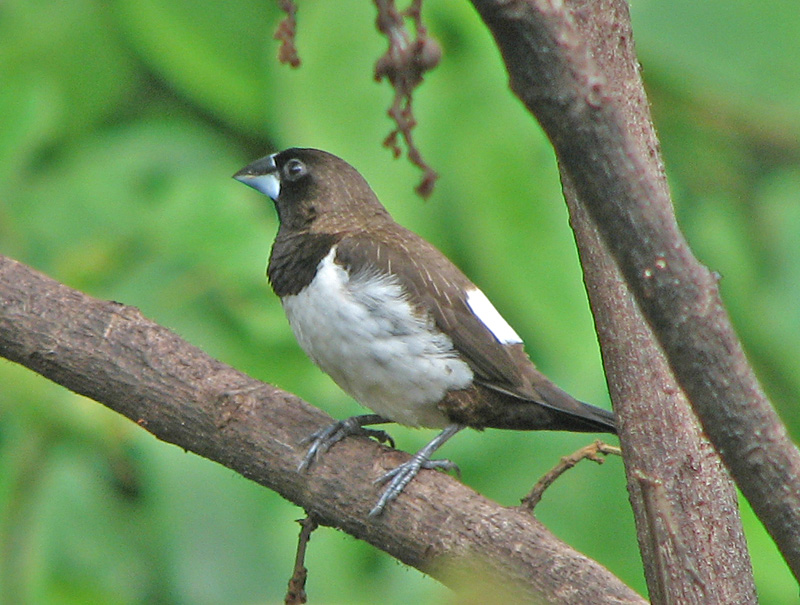
White-rumped munia in Mangalore, Karnataka

- Indian silverbill
- White-rumped munia
- Black-throated munia
- Scaly-breasted munia
- Tricoloured munia

== Rosefinches and buntings ==
- Common rosefinch
- Crested bunting
- Grey-necked bunting
- Striolated bunting
- Black-headed bunting
- Red-headed bunting

== See also ==
- Birds of Coimbatore
