= List of birds of Coimbatore =

This article lists the birds found in various places in and around the Coimbatore, Tamil Nadu, India. Over 285 species of birds have been recorded in and around Coimbatore.

== Acrocephalid warblers ==
- Blyth's reed warbler (Acrocephalus dumetorum)
- Booted warbler (Iduna caligata)
- Paddyfield warbler (Acrocephalus agricola)
- Sykes's warbler (Iduna rama)

== Babblers ==
- Tawny-bellied babbler (Dumetia hyperythra)
- Yellow-billed babbler (Argya affinis)

== Barbets ==
- Brown-headed barbet, large green barbet (Psilopogon zeylanicus)
- Coppersmith barbet, crimson-breasted barbet, coppersmith (Psilopogon haemacephalus)
- Malabar barbet (Psilopogon malabaricus)
- White-cheeked barbet, small green barbet (Psilopogon viridis)

== Bee-eaters ==
- Blue-bearded bee-eater (Nyctyornis athertoni)
- Blue-tailed bee-eater (Merops philippinus)
- Chestnut-headed bee-eater, bay-headed bee-eater (Merops leschenaulti)
- European bee-eater (Merops apiaster)
- Green bee-eater, little green bee-eater (Merops orientalis)
- Blue-cheeked bee-eater (Merops persicus) first sighting

== Bitterns ==
- Black bittern (Ixobrychus flavicollis)
- Cinnamon bittern, chestnut bittern (Ixobrychus cinnamomeus)
- Yellow bittern (Ixobrychus sinensis)

== Bulbuls ==
- Black bulbul, Himalayan black bulbul, Asian black bulbul, square-tailed bulbul (Hypsipetes leucocephalus)
- Grey-headed bulbul (Brachypodius priocephalus)
- Flame-throated bulbul, ruby-throated bulbul, black-crested bulbul (Rubigula gularis)
- Red-whiskered bulbul (Pycnonotus jocosus)
- Red-vented bulbul (Pycnonotus cafer)
- White-browed bulbul (Pycnonotus luteolus)
- Yellow-throated bulbul (Pycnonotus xantholaemus)
- Yellow-browed bulbul (Acritillas indica)

== Cisticola ==
- Zitting cisticola, streaked fantail warbler (Cisticola juncidis)
- Common tailorbird (Orthotomus sutorius)

== Cormorants ==
- Great cormorant (Phalacrocorax carbo)
- Indian cormorant, Indian shag (Phalacrocorax fuscicollis)
- Little cormorant (Microcarbo niger)

== Coucal ==
- Southern coucal, crow pheasant (Centropus sinensis)

== Coursers ==
- Indian courser (Cursorius coromandelicus)

== Crows ==
- House crow (Corvus splendens)
- Jungle crow, large-billed crow, thick-billed crow (Corvus macrorhynchos)

== Cuckoos ==
- Asian koel (Eudynamys scolopaceus)
- Banded bay cuckoo, bay-banded cuckoo (Cacomantis sonneratii)
- Brainfever bird, common hawk-cuckoo (Hierococcyx varius)
- Drongo cuckoo, Asian drongo-cuckoo (Surniculus lugubris)
- Grey-bellied cuckoo, the Indian plaintive cuckoo (Cacomantis passerinus)
- Indian cuckoo (Cuculus micropterus)
- Jacobin cuckoo, pied cuckoo, pied crested cuckoo (Clamator jacobinus)

== Cuckooshrikes ==
- Black-headed cuckoo-shrike (Coracina melanoptera)
- Large cuckoo-shrike (Coracina macei)

== Darters ==
- Darter, snakebird, Oriental darter, Indian darter (Anhinga melanogaster)

== Doves and pigeons ==
- Blue rock pigeon, rock pigeon (Columba livia)
- Emerald dove (Chalcophaps indica)
- Eurasian collared dove, collared dove (Streptopelia decaocto)
- Green imperial pigeon (Ducula aenea)
- Little brown dove, laughing dove, palm dove, Senegal dove (Spilopelia senegalensis)
- Grey-fronted green pigeon (Treron affinis)
- Red collared dove (Streptopelia tranquebarica)
- Spotted dove, Chinese dove, mountain dove, pearl-necked dove, lace-necked dove (Spilopelia chinensis)

== Drongos ==
- Ashy drongo (Dicrurus leucophaeus)
- Black drongo (Dicrurus macrocercus)
- Bronzed drongo (Dicrurus aeneus)
- Greater racket-tailed drongo (Dicrurus paradiseus)
- White-bellied drongo (Dicrurus caerulescens)

== Ducks ==
- Bar-headed goose (Anser indicus)
- Cotton teal, cotton pygmy goose (Nettapus coromandelianus)
- Eurasian teal, common teal (Anas crecca)
- Garganey (Anas querquedula)
- Lesser whistling duck, Indian whistling duck, lesser whistling teal (Dendrocygna javanica)
- Northern shoveler (Anas clypeata)
- Pintail, northern pintail (Anas acuta)
- Ruddy shelduck (Tadorna ferruginea)
- Indian spot-billed duck (Anas poecilorhyncha)

== Egrets ==
- Cattle egret (Bubulcus ibis)
- Great egret, great white egret, common egret, large egret, great white heron (Ardea alba)
- Intermediate egret, median egret, smaller egret, yellow-billed egret (Mesophoyx intermedia)
- Little egret (Egretta garzetta)

== Falcons ==
- Amur falcon, eastern red-footed falcon (Falco amurensis)
- Common kestrel, European kestrel, Eurasian kestrel, Old World kestrel (Falco tinnunculus)
- Eurasian hobby, hobby (Falco subbuteo)
- Red-necked falcon, red-headed merlin (Falco chicquera)

== Finches ==
- Common rosefinch (Carpodacus erythrinus)

== Flamingos ==
- Greater flamingo (Phoenicopterus roseus)

== Flowerpeckers ==
- Nilgiri flowerpecker (Dicaeum concolor)
- Tickell's flowerpecker, pale-billed flowerpecker (Dicaeum erythrorhynchos)

== Flycatchers ==
- Indian paradise flycatcher (Terpsiphone paradisi)
- Asian brown flycatcher (Muscicapa latirostris)
- Black-naped monarch, black-naped blue flycatcher (Hypothymis azurea)
- Brown-breasted flycatcher, Layard's flycatcher (Muscicapa muttui)
- Siberian stonechat, Asian stonechat (Saxicola maurus)
- Indian robin (Saxicoloides fulicatus)
- Nilgiri flycatcher (Eumyias albicaudatus)
- Pied bushchat (Saxicola caprata)
- Tickell's blue flycatcher (Cyornis tickelliae)
- Verditer flycatcher (Eumyias thalassinus)

== Francolins ==
- Grey francolin, grey partridge (Francolinus pondicerianus)

== Godwit ==
- Black-tailed godwit (Limosa limosa)

== Grebes ==
- Little grebe (Tachybaptus ruficollis)

== Gulls ==
- Brown-headed gull (Chroicocephalus brunnicephalus)
- Pallas's gull, great black-headed gull (Ichthyaetus ichthyaetus)
- Heuglin's gull, Siberian gull (Larus heuglini)

== Hawks, kites and eagles ==
- Besra (Accipiter virgatus)
- Black eagle (Ictinaetus malaiensis)
- Black kite (Milvus migrans)
- Black-winged kite (Elanus caeruleus)
- Bonelli's eagle (Aquila fasciata)
- Booted eagle (Hieraaetus pennatus)
- Brahminy kite (Haliastur indus)
- Crested goshawk (Accipiter trivirgatus)
- Oriental honey buzzard, crested honey buzzard (Pernis ptilorhynchus)
- Crested serpent eagle (Spilornis cheela)
- Changeable hawk-eagle, crested hawk-eagle (Nisaetus cirrhatus)
- Lesser fish eagle (Ichthyophaga humilis)
- Montagu's harrier (Circus pygargus)
- Osprey, sea hawk, fish eagle, fish hawk (Pandion haliaetus)
- Pallid harrier (Circus macrourus)
- Pied harrier (Circus melanoleucos)
- Rufous-bellied hawk-eagle (Lophotriorchis kienerii)
- Short-toed snake eagle, short-toed eagle (Circaetus gallicus)
- Shikra (Accipiter badius)
- Steppe eagle (Aquila nipalensis)
- Western marsh harrier, Eurasian marsh-harrier (Circus aeruginosus)
- White-bellied sea eagle, white-breasted sea eagle (Haliaeetus leucogaster)
- White-eyed buzzard (Butastur teesa)

== Herons ==
- Black-crowned night heron, night heron (Nycticorax nycticorax)
- Grey heron (Ardea cinerea)
- Indian pond heron, paddybird (Ardeola grayii)
- Purple heron (Ardea purpurea)
- Striated heron, mangrove heron, little heron, green-backed heron (Butorides striata)
- Western reef heron, western reef egret (Egretta gularis)

== Hornbills ==
- Indian grey hornbill (Ocyceros birostris)
- Malabar grey hornbill (Ocyceros griseus)
- Malabar pied hornbill, lesser pied hornbill (Anthracoceros coronatus)
- The great Indian hornbill (Buceros Bicornis)

== Ibises ==
- Black-headed ibis, Oriental white ibis (Threskiornis melanocephalus)
- Glossy ibis (Plegadis falcinellus)
- Black ibis, Indian black ibis, red-naped ibis (Pseudibis papillosa)

== Ioras ==
- Common iora (Aegithina tiphia)

== Jacanas ==
- Bronze-winged jacana (Metopidius indicus)
- Pheasant-tailed jacana (Hydrophasianus chirurgus)

== Kingfishers ==
- Pied kingfisher (Ceryle rudis)
- Common kingfisher, small blue kingfisher, Eurasian kingfisher, river kingfisher (Alcedo Bengalensis)
- Stork-billed kingfisher (Pelargopsis capensis)
- White-throated kingfisher, white-breasted kingfisher, Smyrna kingfisher (Halcyon smyrnensis)

== Lapwings ==
- Red-wattled lapwing (Vanellus indicus)
- Yellow-wattled lapwing (Vanellus malabaricus)

== Larks ==
- Ashy-crowned sparrow lark, ashy-crowned finch-lark, black-bellied finch-lark (Eremopterix griseus)
- Indian bushlark, red-winged bushlark (Mirafra erythroptera)
- Jerdon's bushlark (Mirafra affinis)
- Oriental skylark, Oriental lark, small skylark (Alauda gulgula)
- Rufous-tailed lark, rufous-tailed finch-lark (Ammomanes phoenicura)
- Sykes's lark (Galerida deva)

== Laughingthrushes ==
- Common babbler (Turdoides caudata)
- Jungle babbler (Turdoides striata)
- Large grey babbler (Turdoides malcolmi)
- Yellow-billed babbler, white-headed babbler (Turdoides affinis)

== Leafbirds ==
- Golden-fronted leafbird (Chloropsis aurifrons)
- Jerdon's leafbird (Chloropsis jerdoni)

== Malkohas ==
- Blue-faced malkoha (Phaenicophaeus viridirostris)
- Sirkeer malkoha, sirkeer cuckoo (Phaenicophaeus leschenaultii)

== Martins ==
- Dusky crag martin (Ptyonoprogne concolor)

== Minivets ==
- Scarlet minivet (Pericrocotus flammeus)
- Small minivet (Pericrocotus cinnamomeus)

== Nightjars ==
- Indian nightjar (Caprimulgus asiaticus)

== Nuthatches ==
- Chestnut-bellied nuthatch (Sitta cinnamoventris)
- Velvet-fronted nuthatch (Sitta frontalis)

== Old World warblers ==
- Yellow-eyed babbler (Chrysomma sinense)

== Orioles ==
- Black-headed oriole (Oriolus larvatus)
- Indian golden oriole (Oriolus kundoo)

== Owls ==
- Barn owl, common barn owl (Tyto alba)
- Brown fish owl (Bubo zeylonensis, Ketupa zeylonensis)
- Collared scops owl (Otus lettia)
- Eurasian eagle owl, European eagle-owl, eagle-owl, Indian great horned owl (Bubo bubo)
- Jungle owlet, barred jungle owlet (Glaucidium radiatum)
- Mottled wood owl (Strix ocellata)
- Short-eared owl (Asio flammeus)
- Spotted owlet (Athene brama)

== Parrots and parakeets ==
- Blue-winged parakeet, Malabar parakeet (Psittacula columboides)
- Plum-headed parakeet (Psittacula cyanocephala)
- Rose-ringed parakeet, ring-necked parakeet (Psittacula krameri)
- Vernal hanging parrot (Loriculus vernalis)

== Pelicans ==
- Great white pelican, eastern white pelican, rosy pelican, white pelican (Pelecanus onocrotalus)
- Spot-billed pelican, grey pelican (Pelecanus philippensis)

== Phalarope ==
- Red-necked phalarope (Phalaropus lobatus)

== Phylloscopid warblers ==
- Greenish warbler (Phylloscopus trochiloides)

== Pipits ==
- Paddyfield pipit, Oriental pipit (Anthus rufulus)
- Richard's pipit (Anthus richardi)

== Pitta ==
- Indian pitta (Pitta brachyura)

== Plovers ==
- Kentish plover (Charadrius alexandrinus)
- Little ringed plover (Charadrius dubius)
- Lesser sand plover (Charadrius mongolus)

== Pratincoles ==
- Collared pratincole, common pratincole (Glareola pratincola)
- Small pratincole, little pratincole, small Indian pratincole (Glareola lactea)

== Prinias ==
- Ashy prinia, ashy wren-warbler (Prinia socialis)
- Grey-breasted prinia (Prinia hodgsonii)
- Jungle prinia (Prinia sylvatica)
- Plain prinia, white-browed, wren-warbler (Prinia inornata)

== Quails ==
- Common quail (Coturnix coturnix)
- Common buttonquail, Kurrichane buttonquail, small buttonquail, Andalusian hemipode (Turnix sylvaticus)
- Jungle bush quail (Perdicula asiatica)
- Painted bush quail (Perdicula erythrorhyncha)

== Rails, crakes and coots ==
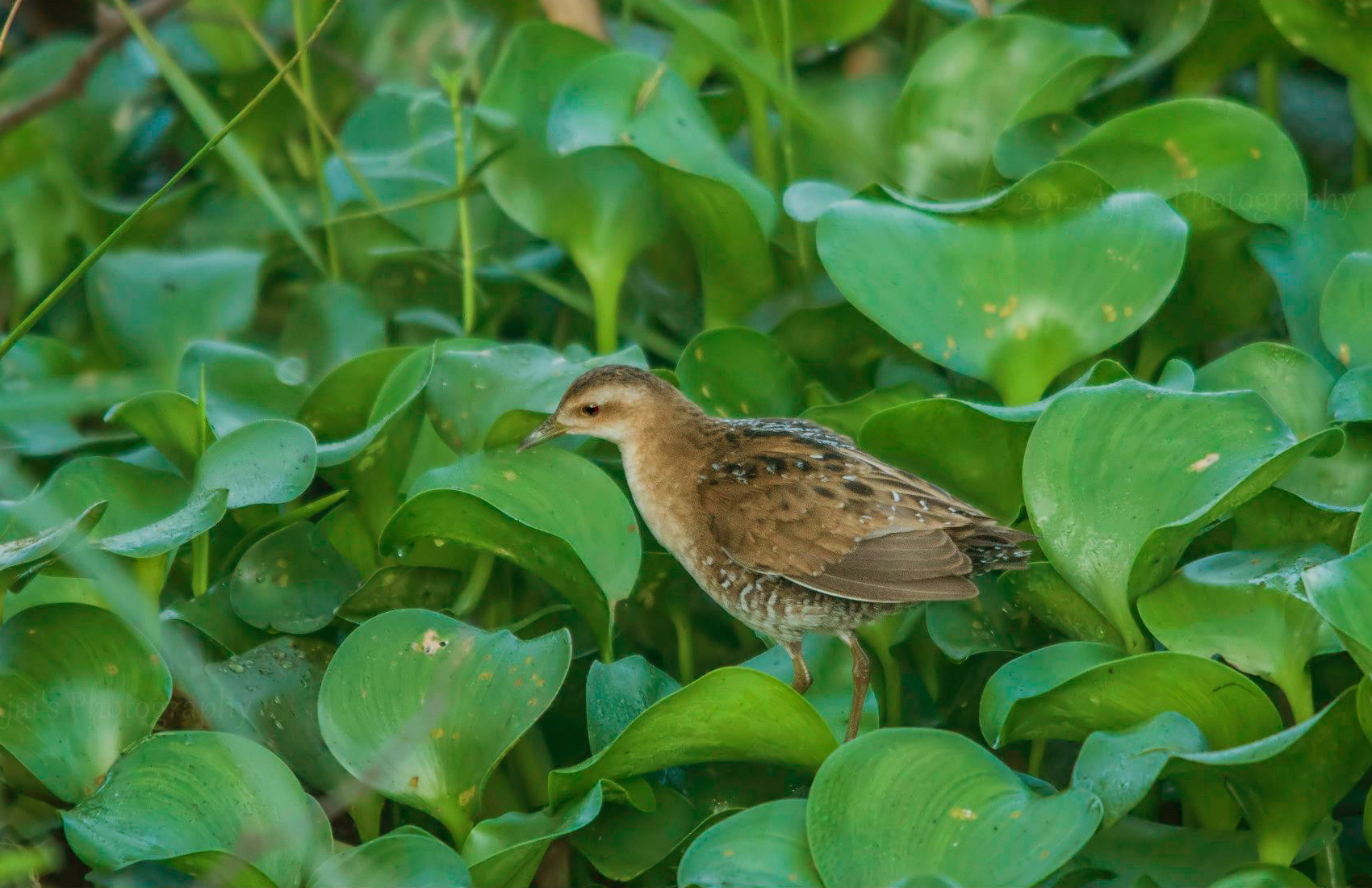
Baillon's crake

- Baillon's crake (Porzana pusilla)
- Common coot, Eurasian coot, coot (Fulica atra)
- Common moorhen (Gallinula chloropus)
- Little crake (Porzana parva)
- Purple moorhen, purple swamphen, purple gallinule, purple coot (Porphyrio porphyrio)
- Ruddy-breasted crake, ruddy crake (Porzana fusca)
- Water cock (Gallicrex cinerea)
- White-breasted waterhen (Amaurornis phoenicurus)

== Robin ==
- Indian robin (Saxicoloides fulicatus)
- Oriental magpie robin (Copsychus saularis)

== Rollers and hoopoe ==
- Cinnamon roller, broad-billed roller (Eurystomus glaucurus)
- Hoopoe (Upupa epops)
- Indian roller, blue jay (Coracias benghalensis)

== Sandgrouses ==
- Chestnut-bellied sandgrouse (Pterocles exustus)
- Painted sandgrouse, ganga indien (Pterocles indicus)

== Sandpipers ==
- Common sandpiper (Actitis hypoleucos)
- Green sandpiper (Tringa ochropus)
- Marsh sandpiper (Tringa stagnatilis)
- Wood sandpiper (Tringa glareola)

== Shank ==
- Common greenshank (Tringa nebularia)
- Common redshank, redshank (Tringa totanus)

== Shrikes ==
- Bar-winged flycatcher-shrike (Hemipus picatus)
- Bay-backed shrike (Lanius vittatus)
- Brown shrike (Lanius cristatus)
- Common woodshrike (Tephrodornis pondicerianus)
- Long-tailed shrike, rufous-backed shrike (Lanius schach)

== Snipes ==
- Common snipe (Gallinago gallinago)
- Greater painted-snipe (Rostratula benghalensis)

== Sparrows ==
- House sparrow (Passer domesticus)
- Yellow-throated sparrow, chestnut-shouldered petronia (Gymnoris xanthocollis)

== Spoonbills ==
- Eurasian spoonbill, common spoonbill (Platalea leucorodia)

== Spurfowls ==
- Grey junglefowl, Sonnerat's junglefowl (Gallus sonneratii)
- Indian peafowl, blue peafowl (Pavo cristatus)
- Red spurfowl (Galloperdix spadicea)

== Stilts ==
- Black-winged stilt, common stilt, pied stilt (Himantopus himantopus)

== Stints ==
- Little stint (Calidris minuta, Erolia minuta)
- Temminck's stint (Calidris temminckii)

== Starlings ==
- Brahminy starling, brahminy myna (Sturnia pagodarum)
- Chestnut-tailed starling, grey-headed myna (Sturnia malabarica)
- Common myna, Indian myna, mynah (Acridotheres tristis)
- Jungle myna (Acridotheres fuscus)
- Rosy starling, rose-coloured starling, rose-coloured pastor (Pastor roseus)

== Storks ==
- Asian openbill, Asian open-billed stork (Anastomus oscitans)
- Painted stork (Mycteria leucocephala)
- Woolly-necked stork, bishop stork, white-necked stork, episcopos (Ciconia episcopus)

== Sunbirds and spiderhunters ==
- Little spiderhunter (Arachnothera longirostra)
- Loten's sunbird, long-billed sunbird, maroon-breasted sunbird (Cinnyris lotenius)
- Purple-rumped sunbird (Leptocoma zeylonica)
- Purple sunbird (Cinnyris asiaticus)
- Crimson-backed sunbird, small sunbird (Leptocoma minima)

== Swallows ==
- Ashy woodswallow, ashy swallow-shrike (Artamus fuscus)
- Barn swallow (Hirundo rustica)
- Wire-tailed swallow (Hirundo smithii)
- Red-rumped swallow (Cecropis daurica)
- Streak-throated swallow, Indian cliff swallow (Petrochelidon fluvicola)

== Swifts ==
- Asian palm swift (Cypsiurus balasiensis)
- Crested treeswift (Hemiprocne coronata)
- House swift (Apus nipalensis)

== Terns ==
- Common tern (Sterna hirundo)
- Gull-billed tern (Gelochelidon nilotica)
- River tern, Indian river tern (Sterna aurantia)
- Whiskered tern (Chlidonias hybrida)

== Thrushes and allies ==
- Indian blackbird, blackbird, Eurasian blackbird (Turdus nigropileus [WG] or T. spencei [EG] or T. simillimus)
- Malabar whistling thrush, whistling schoolboy (Myophonus horsfieldii)
- Orange-headed thrush (Geokichla citrina)
- Scaly thrush (Zoothera dauma)
- Nilgiri blue robin, Nilgiri shortwing, white-bellied shortwing, rufous-bellied shortwing (Myiomela major)

== Treepies ==
- Rufous treepie, Indian treepie (Dendrocitta vagabunda)
- White-bellied treepie (Dendrocitta leucogastra)

== Trogons ==
- Malabar trogon (Harpactes fasciatus)

== Tit ==
- Cinereous tit, great tit (Parus cinereus)
- Indian yellow tit (Parus aplonotus)

== Wagtails and pipits ==
- Forest wagtail (Dendronanthus indicus)
- Grey wagtail (Motacilla cinerea)
- Large pied wagtail, large pied wagtail (Motacilla maderaspatensis)
- White wagtail (Motacilla alba)

== Waxbills and allies ==
- Tricoloured munia (Lonchura malacca)
- Black-throated munia, Jerdon's mannikin (Lonchura jerdoni or kelaarti)
- Red munia, red munia, strawberry finch (Amandava amandava)
- Scaly-breasted munia, spotted munia (Lonchura punctulata)
- White-rumped munia, white-rumped mannikin, Striated finch (Lonchura striata)
- Indian silverbill, white-throated munia (Euodice malabarica)

== Weavers ==
- Baya weaver (Ploceus philippinus)

== White-eye ==
- Indian white-eye (Zosterops palpebrosus)

== Woodpeckers ==
- Brown-capped pygmy woodpecker (Dendrocopos nanus)
- Golden-backed woodpecker, lesser golden-backed woodpecker, lesser goldenback (Dinopium benghalense)
- Greater flameback, greater goldenback, large golden-backed woodpecker, Malherbe's golden-backed woodpecker (Chrysocolaptes guttacristatus)
- Lesser golden-backed woodpecker, lesser goldenback (Dinopium benghalense)
- Lesser yellownape (Picus chlorolophus)
- Rufous woodpecker (Micropternus brachyurus)
- Speckled piculet (Picumnus innominatus)
- Streak-throated woodpecker (Picus xanthopygaeus)
- Yellow-crowned woodpecker, Mahratta woodpecker (Dendrocopos mahrattensis)

== See also ==
- List of birds of Tamil Nadu
- List of birds of South India
- List of birds of India
