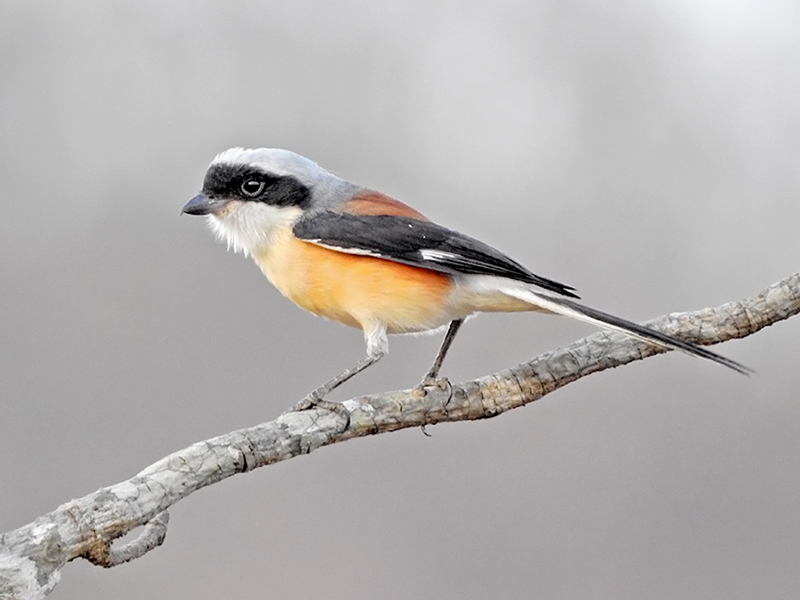
- Lanius vittatus From Mangaon, Maharashtra, India

Conservation status
- Least Concern (IUCN 3.1)

Scientific classification
- Kingdom: Animalia
- Phylum: Chordata
- Class: Aves
- Order: Passeriformes
- Family: Laniidae
- Genus: Lanius
- Species: L. vittatus

Binomial name
- Lanius vittatus Valenciennes, 1826

= Bay-backed shrike =

Species of bird

The bay-backed shrike (Lanius vittatus) is a member of the bird family Laniidae, the shrikes, resident in South Asia.

== Description ==
It is smallish shrike at 17 cm, maroon-brown above with a pale rump and long black tail with white edges. The underparts are white, but with buff flanks. The crown and nape are grey, with a typical shrike black bandit mask through the eye. There is a small white wing patch, and the bill and legs are dark grey.

Sexes are similar, but young birds are washed-out versions of the adults.

== Habits and habitat ==
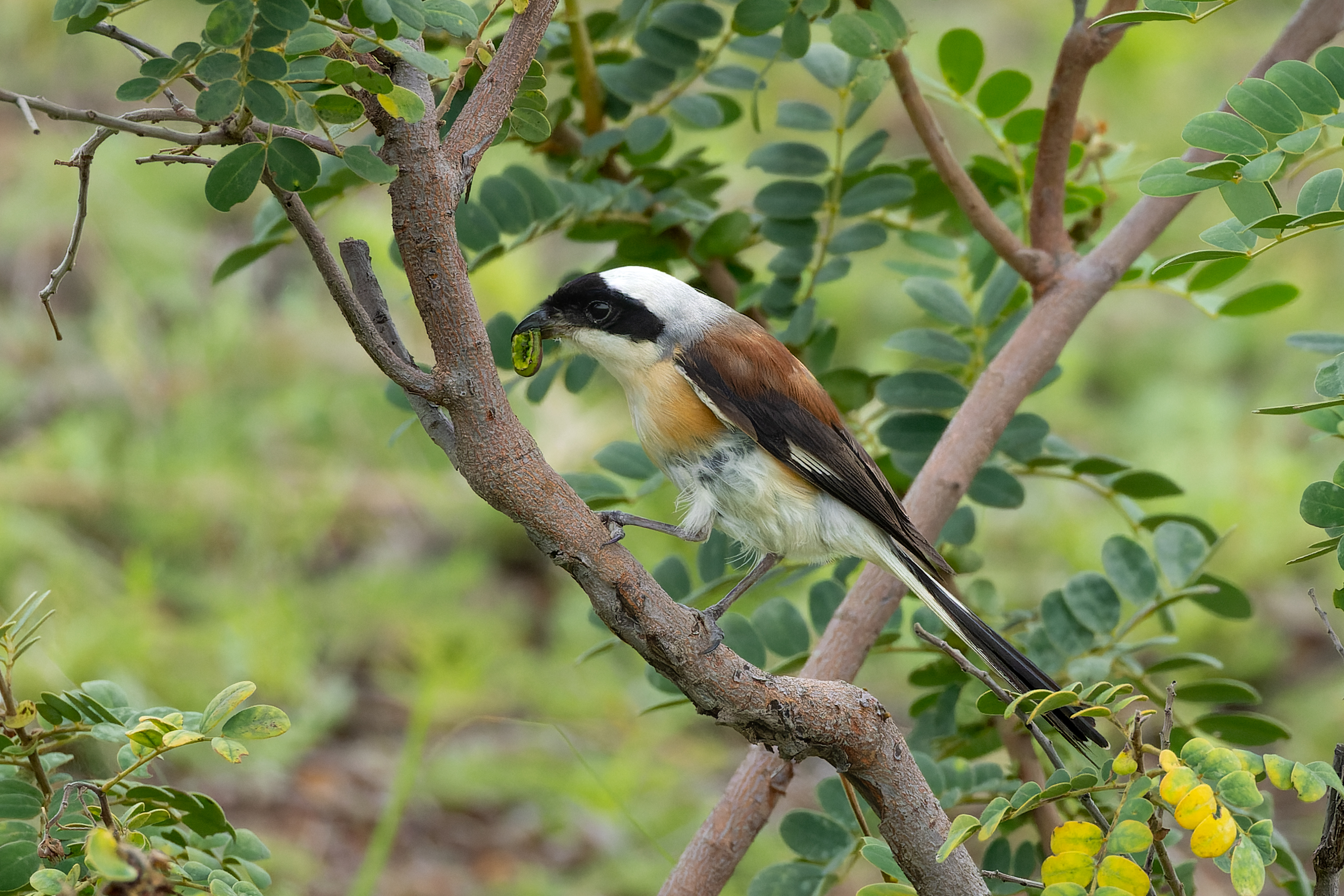
Bay-backed Shrike (Lanius vittatus) eating insect in Bhigwan, Maharashtra, India.

The bay-backed shrike has a characteristic upright "shrike" attitude perched on a bush, from which it sallies after lizards, large insects, small birds and rodents.

Prey may be impaled upon a sharp point, such as a thorn. Thus secured they can be ripped with the strong hooked bill, but its feet are not suited for tearing.

It is a widespread resident or breeder in southern Asia and occurs in Iran, Afghanistan, Pakistan, Nepal, India, and Turkmenistan. It is occasionally found in Sri Lanka, Bhutan, Oman, United Arab Emirates, and Qatar. It nests in bushes in scrubby areas and cultivation, laying 3–5 eggs.
