= Chamundi Hills =

Hill east of Mysore in Karnataka, India

Coordinates: 12.273°N 76.67°E

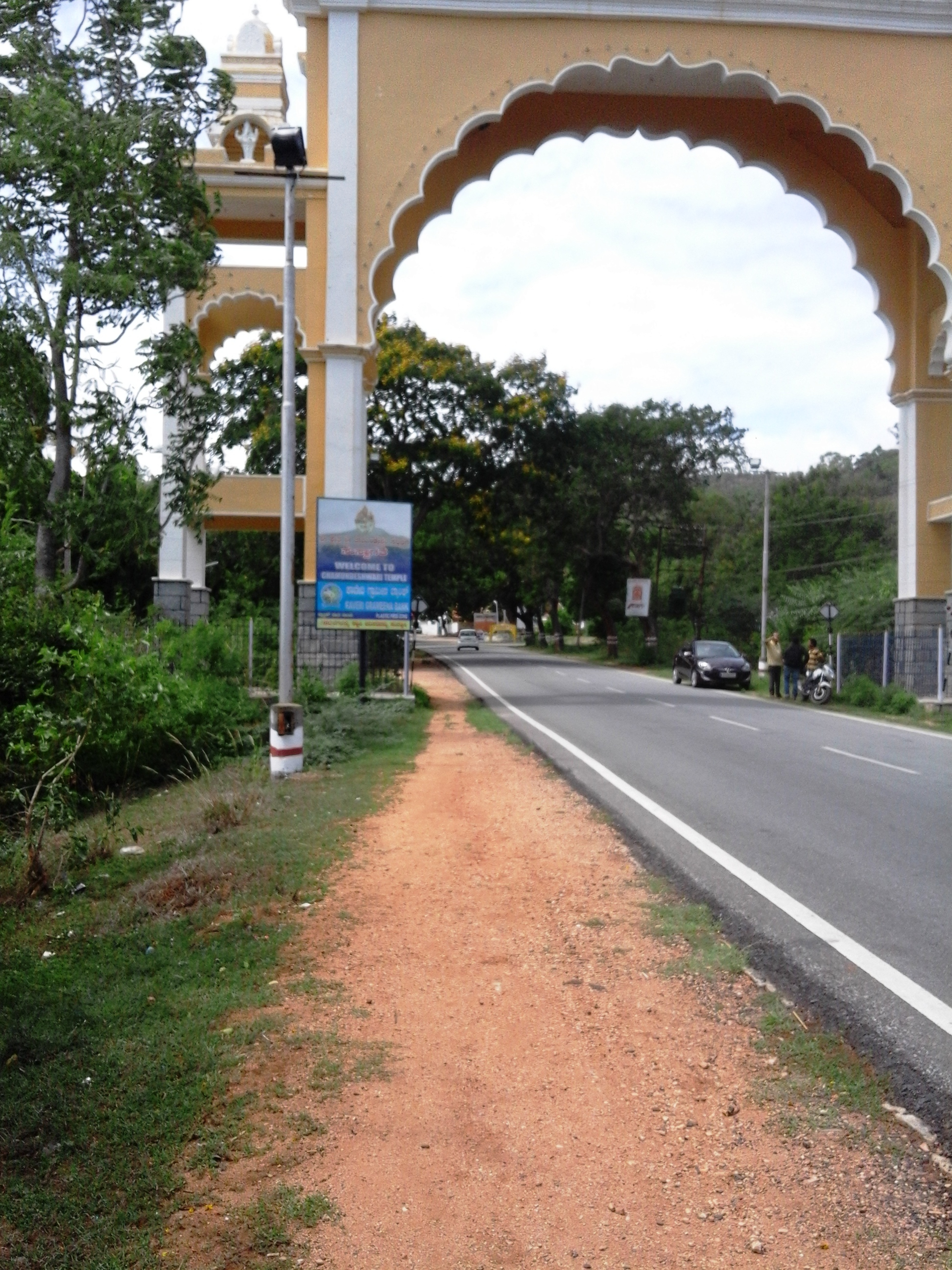
Entrance to Chamundi Hills

The Chamundi Hill is located 13 km east of Mysore, Karnataka, India. The name comes from the Chamundeshwari Temple at the peak. The average elevation is 1,060 metres (3,480 ft).

== Attractions ==
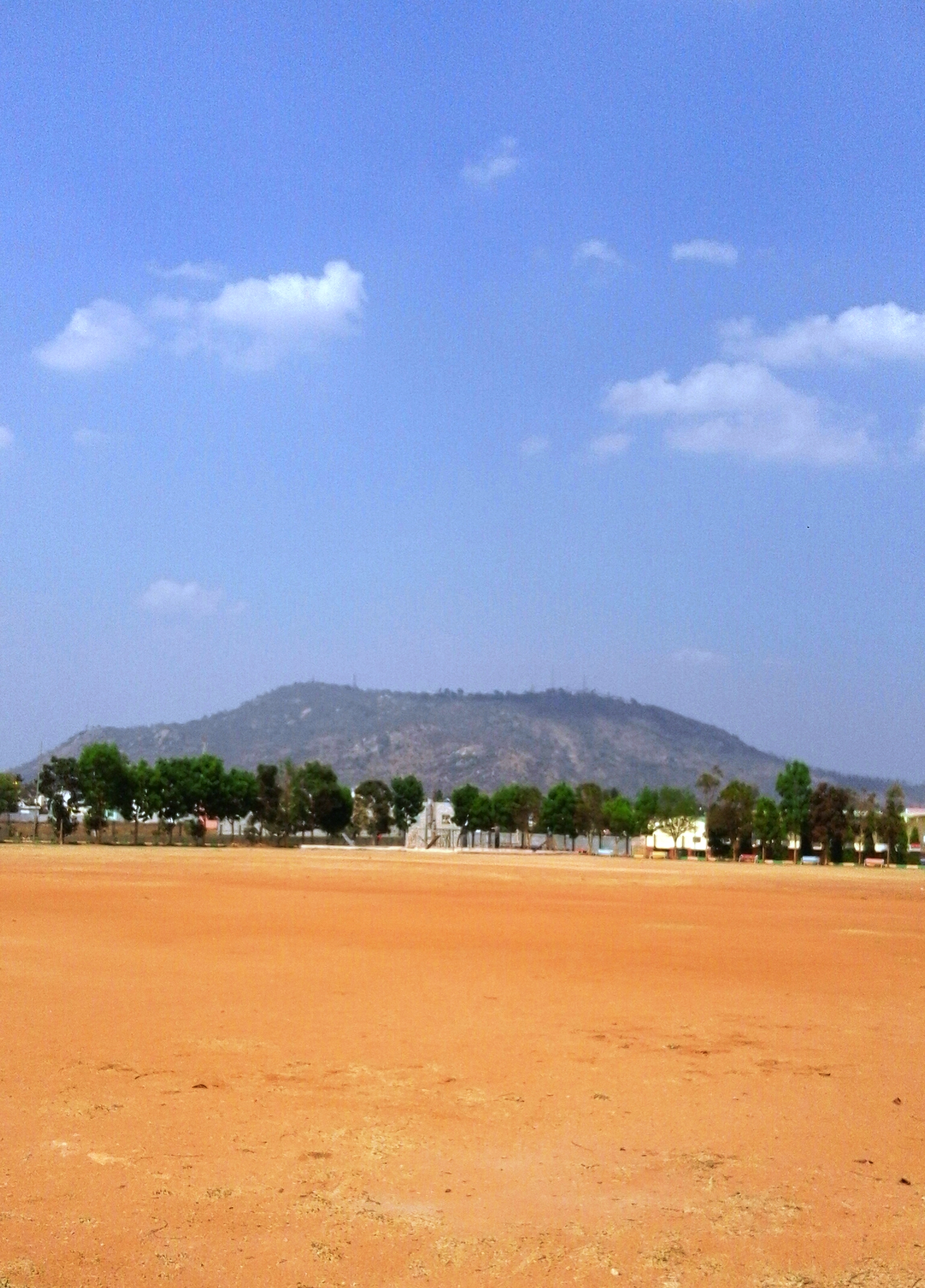
Chamundi Hills seen from J.P.Nagar Library, Mysore

The Chamundeshwari Temple is located atop the Chamundi Hills. Patronised for centuries by Mysore rulers, it was renovated during the time of Krishnaraja Wodeyar III (1827).

== Temple ==
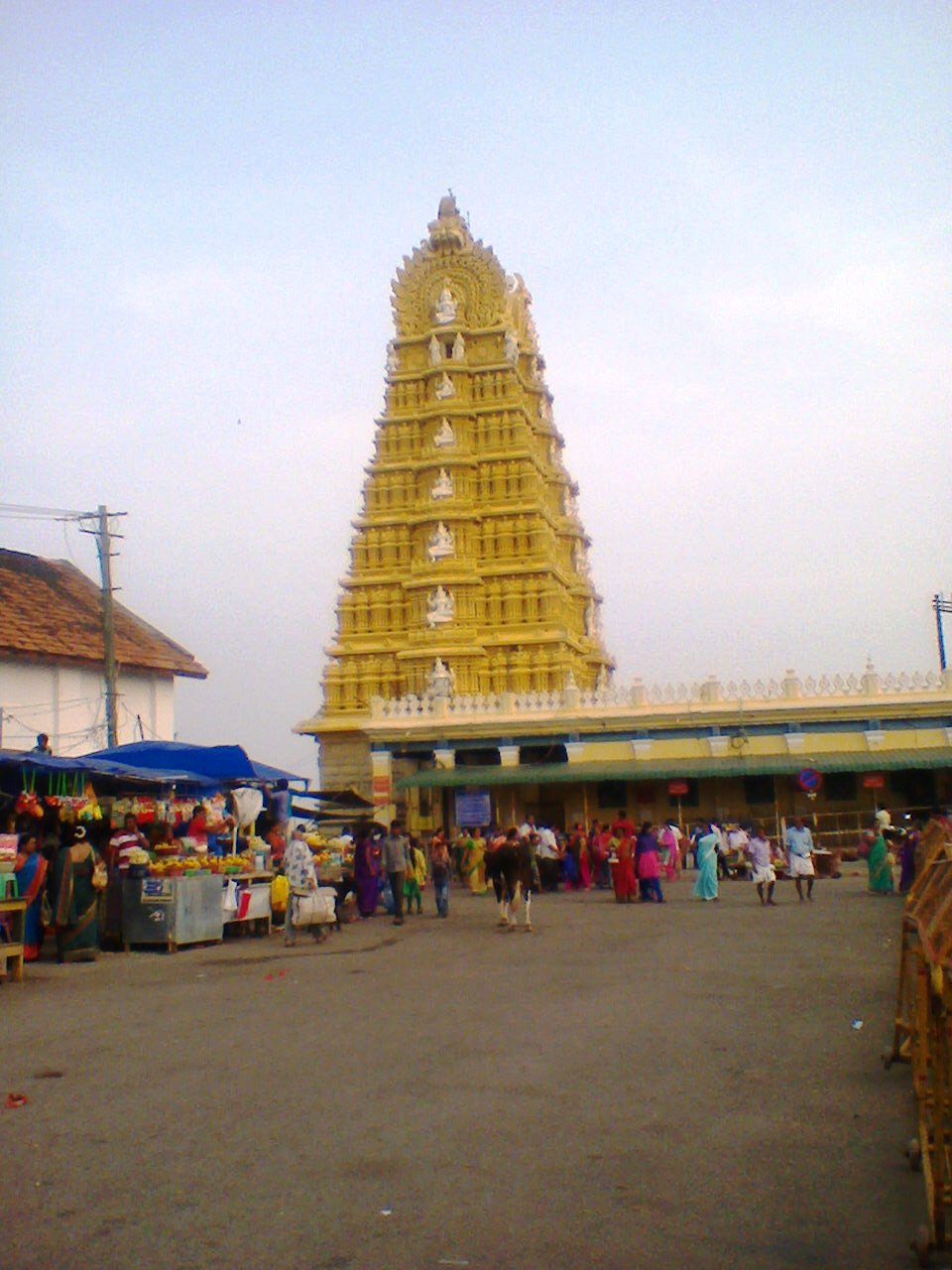
Chamundeshwari Temple

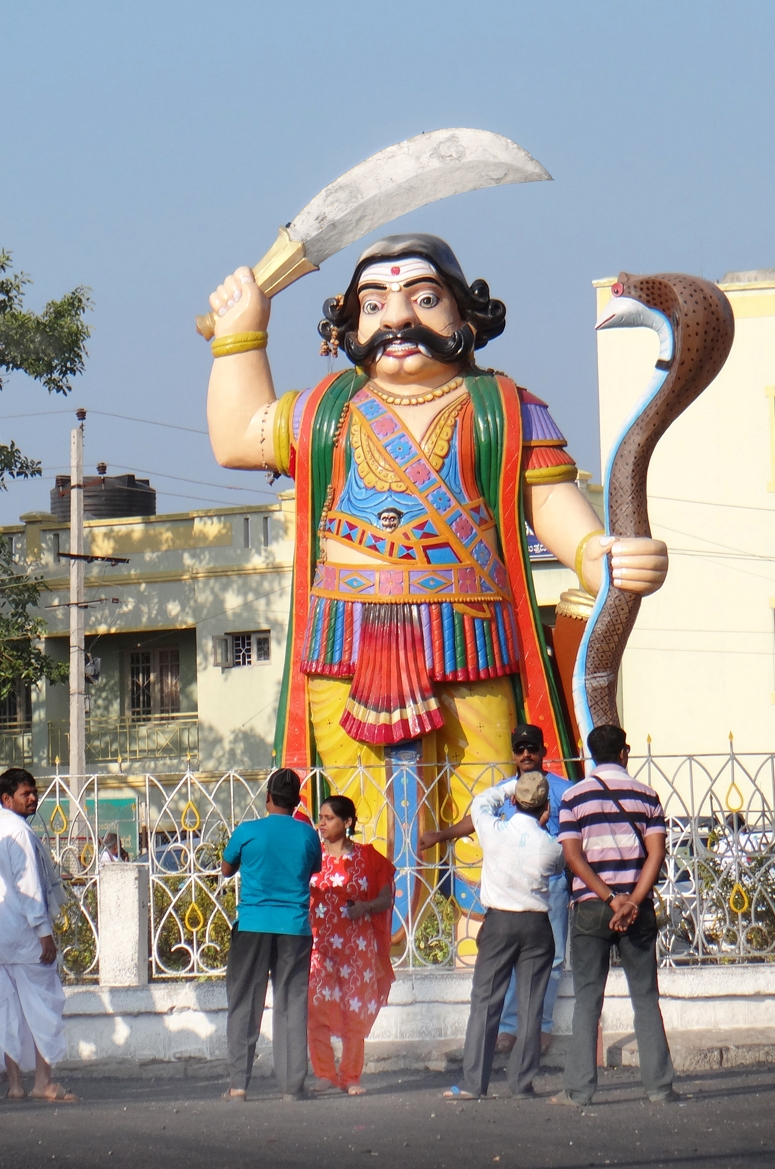
Statue of Mahishasura

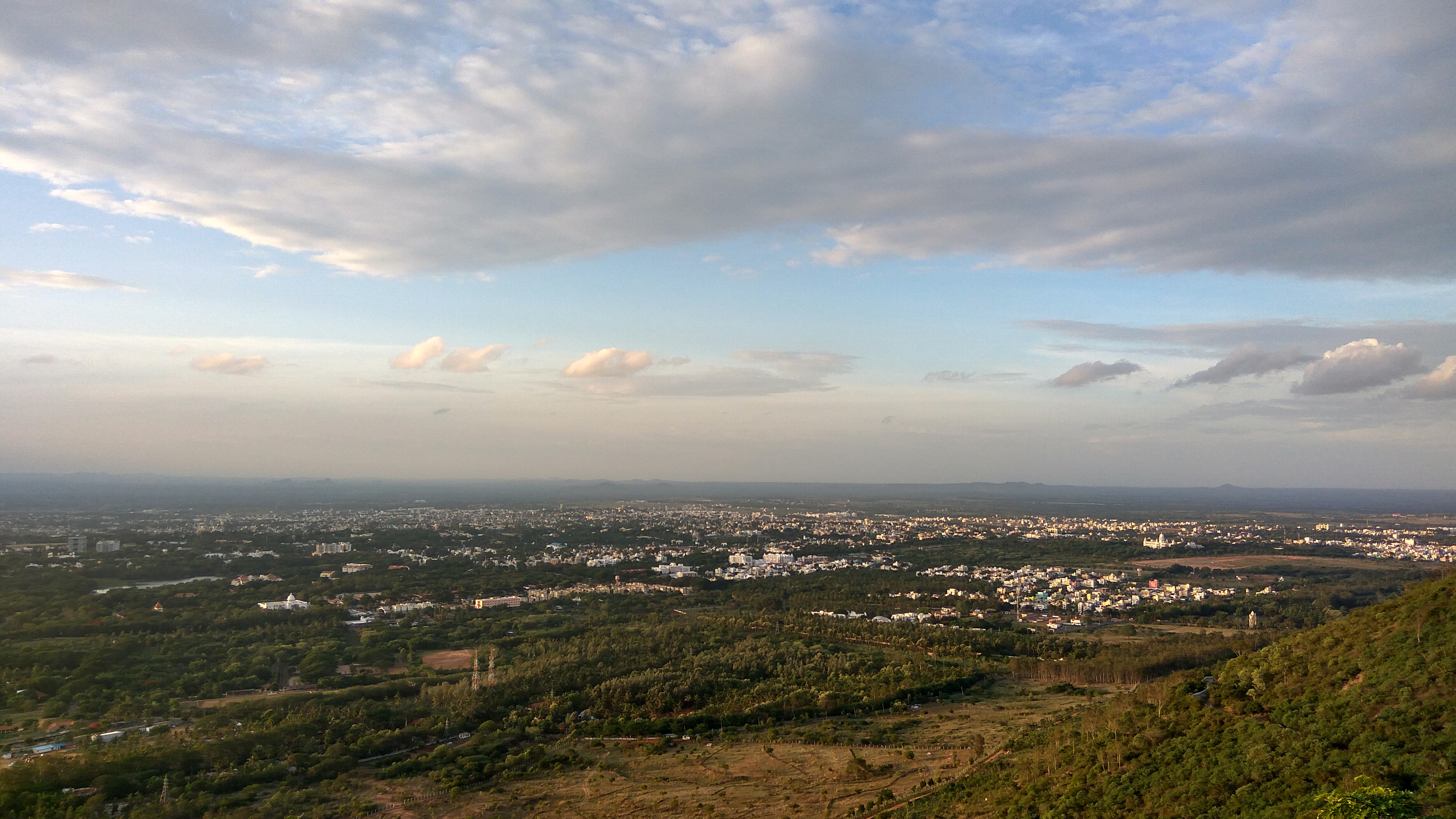
View of the City of Mysuru from Chamundi Hills

Named after the Goddess Chamundi, the Chamundeshwari Temple sits atop the main hill. The main hill itself features an ancient stone stairway of 1,008+ steps leading to its summit, which was constructed in 1659 by Dodda Devaraja Wodeyar. Approximately halfway to the summit is statue of bull Nandi, the vahana, or "vehicle" of Lord Shiva, which is 4.9 m tall and 7.6 m long and carved out of a single piece of black granite. Around this point, the steps become significantly less steep and eventually the climber is rewarded with a panoramic view of the city.

The Temple has a quadrangular structure. A key feature is the statue of Mahishasura bearing a sword in his right hand and a cobra in the left. Within the temple's sanctum stands a sculpted depiction of Chamundeshwari. She is seated with her right heel pressed against the lowest of the seven chakras. This cross-legged yogic posture echoes the posture of Lord Shiva. Worshipers believe that this powerful yogic posture, if mastered, provides an added dimensional view of the universe.

During the rule of Wadiyars of Mysore, the Maharaja was seated in the golden howdah atop the elephant during Vijayadashami (tenth day of Dasara) procession. Post-independence, the Maharaja was replaced by an idol of Chamundeshwari, while the Dasara into a State festival.

From the peak of the Chamundi hills, the Mysore Palace, the Karanji Lake and several smaller temples are visible.

Due to its popularity as a major pilgrimage and tourist destination, Chamundi Hills faces environmental challenges such as plastic waste accumulation and pressure on local ecosystems. Various cleanliness and conservation efforts are periodically undertaken by local authorities and community groups to address these concerns and promote sustainable tourism.

== Legend ==
According to a legend, the asura Mahishasura (king of the city that is currently known as Mysore) was killed by goddess Chamundeswari (also called Chamundi) after a fierce battle. The goddess is also called Mahishasura Mardini.

According to mythology, this rocky hill was known as Mahabalachala. Two ancient temples occupy the hill, the Mahabaleshvara and the Chamundeshvari; the Mahabaleshvara Temple on the hill is the older of the two and is a place of pilgrimage. The car festival and 'Teppotsava' are held there.

== The influence on the name of Mysuru ==
The name of Mysuru comes from the old Kannada word "Mahishooru". Mahishooru literally means 'the village of Mahishasura.' The British then modified this name to 'Mysore'. Then, on 1 November 2014, the government of Karnataka changed the name to 'Mysuru'. The hill thus has an indirect influence on the name of the city

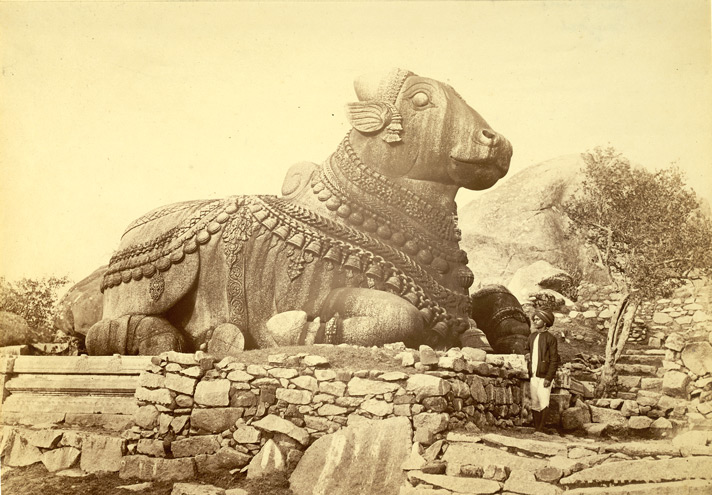
A 2nd-century CE sculpture of Nandi at the Chamundi Hills

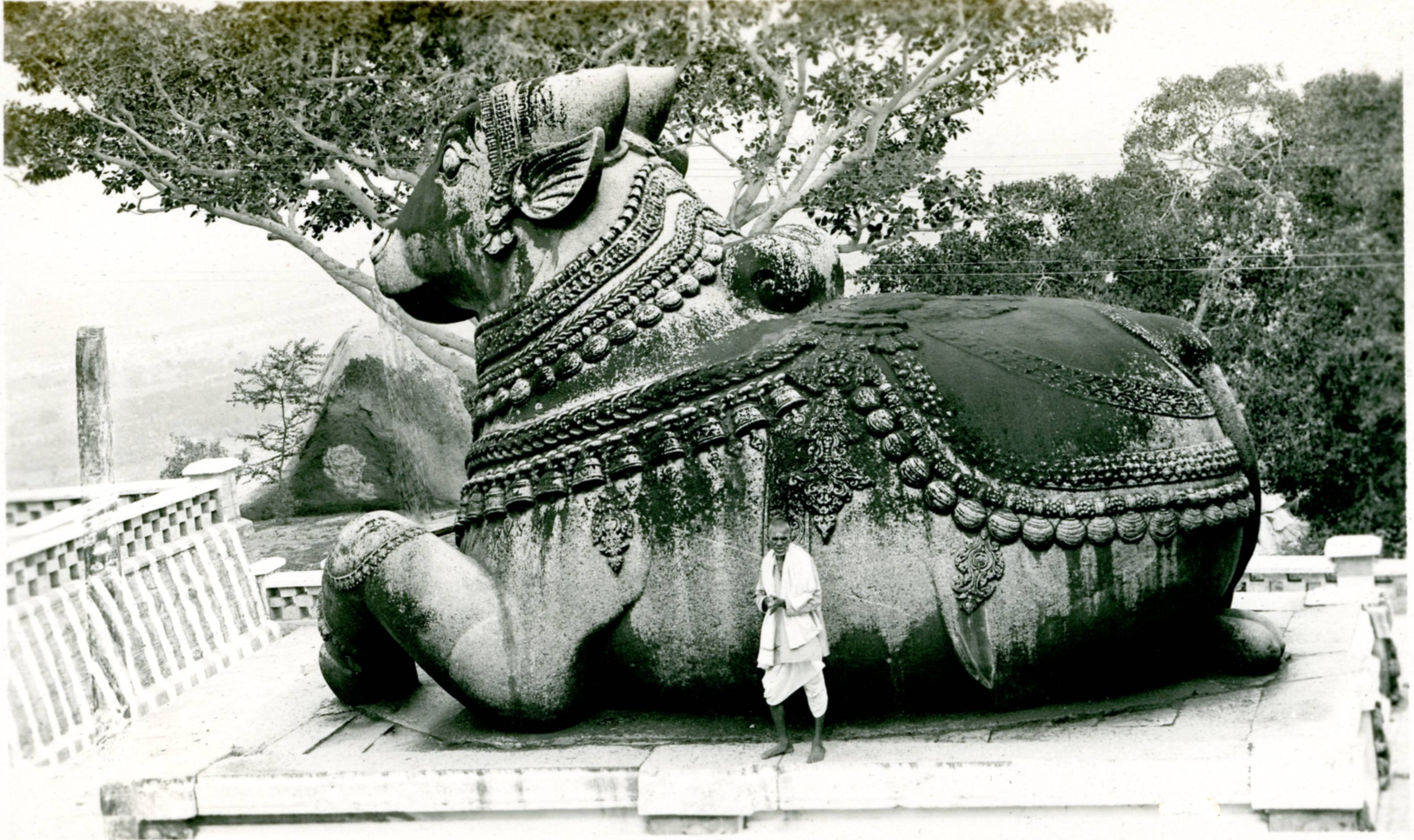
Statue in 1920

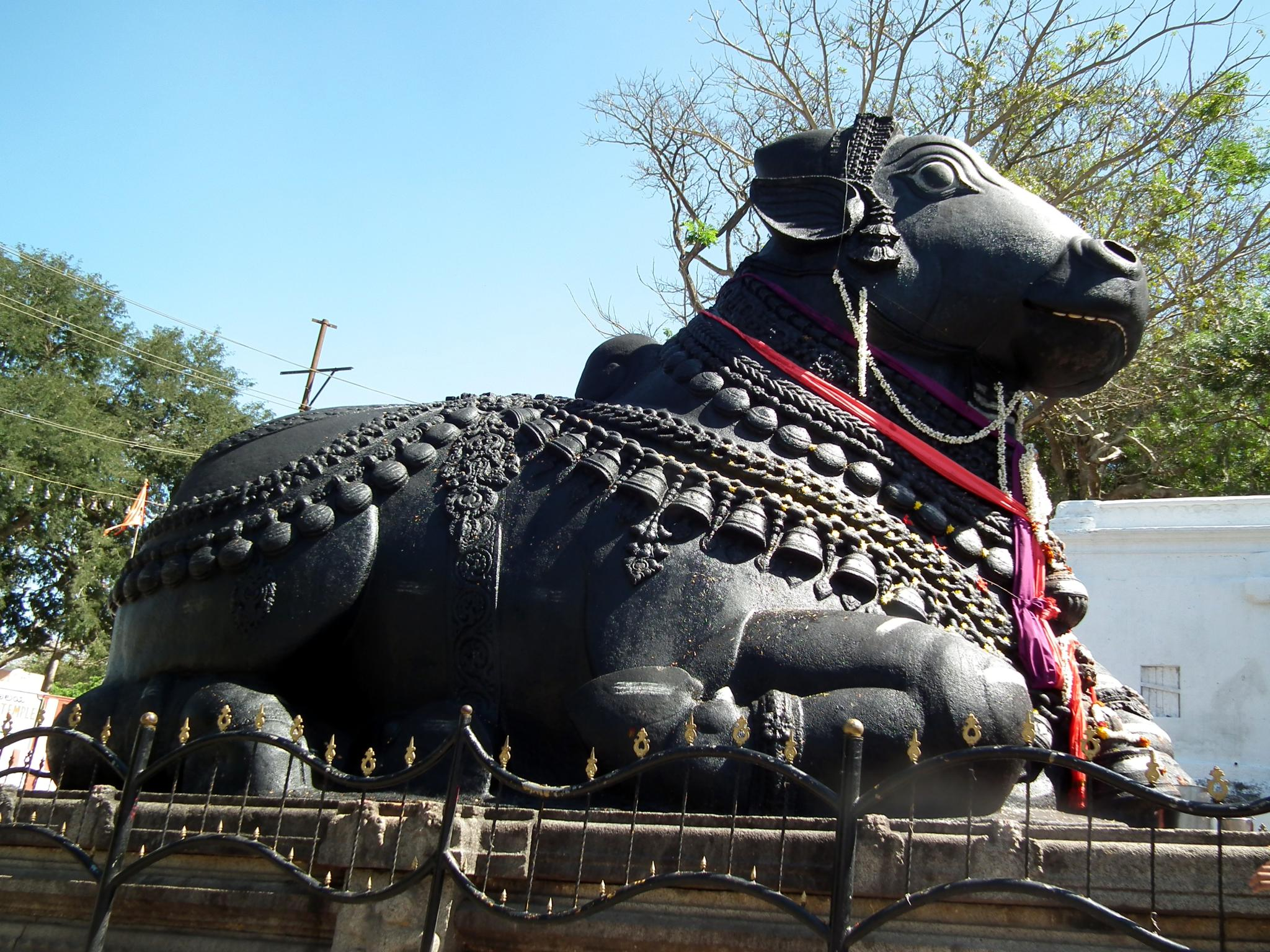
The Nandi statue in the modern times

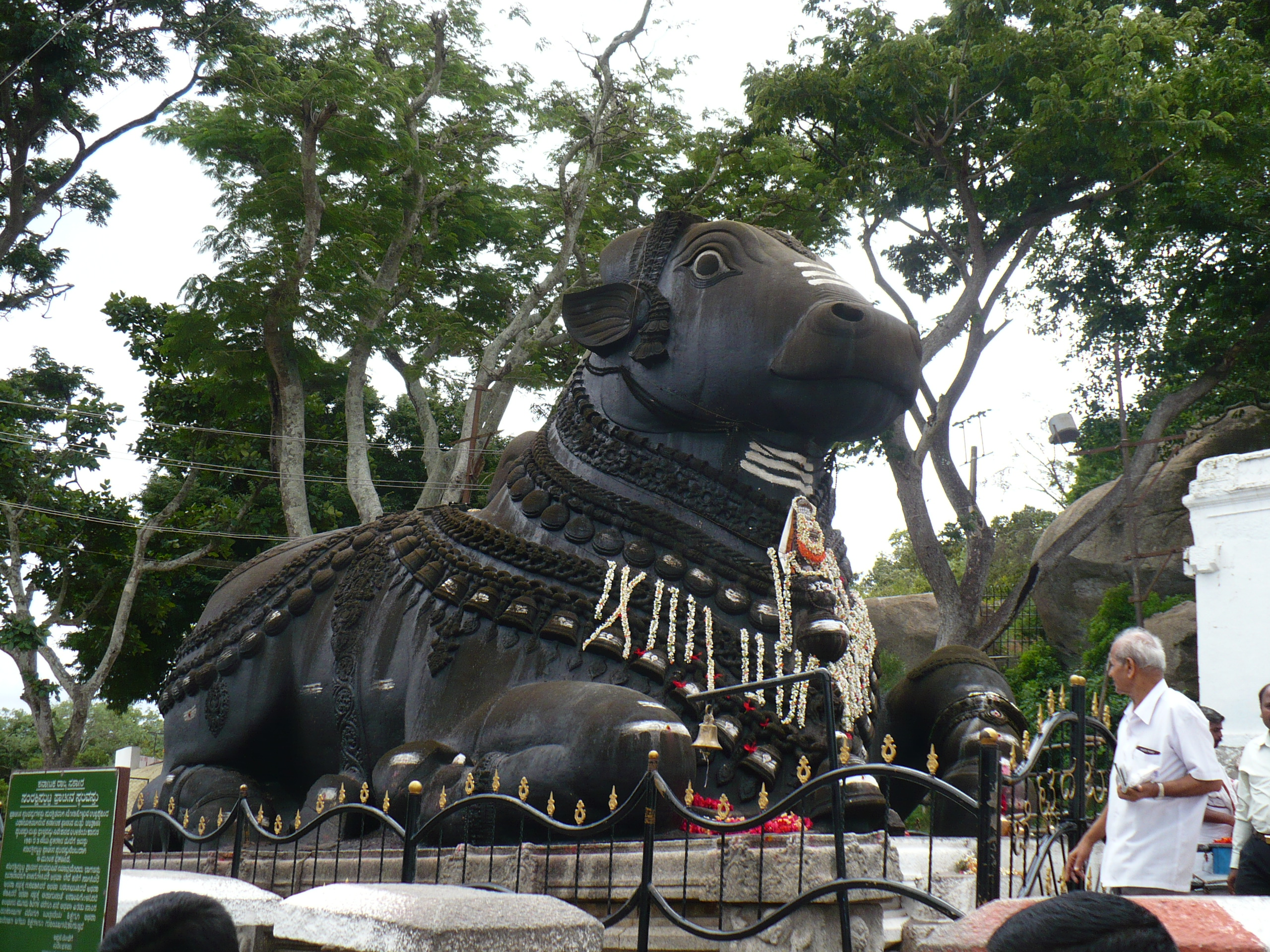
The decorated Nandi statue

== Biodiversity ==
Chamundi Hills Reserve Forest Area is a ecological hotspot spanning 613.51 hectares and one of the very important factors contributing to biodiversity and Microclimate of Mysore area. In 2011, 50 hectares of the hills area was announced as Daivivana (ದೈವೀ ವನ - Divine Forest) for strengthening the conservation efforts.

=== Flora and Fauna ===
A research spanning 11 years (1996-2006) has successfully documented 193 bird species which is one third of total bird species found in Karnataka State (570). In India, it accounts to 15% of List of birds of India (1,396). Out of these 193, 96 were resident and 41 were migratory birds. Resident birds include Bonelli's eagle and Franklin's prinia; and migratory ones include vulnerable Lesser kestrel (winter) and summer ones like Pied Crested Cuckoo and Brainfever Bird. Recently, Peacock population is on the rise.

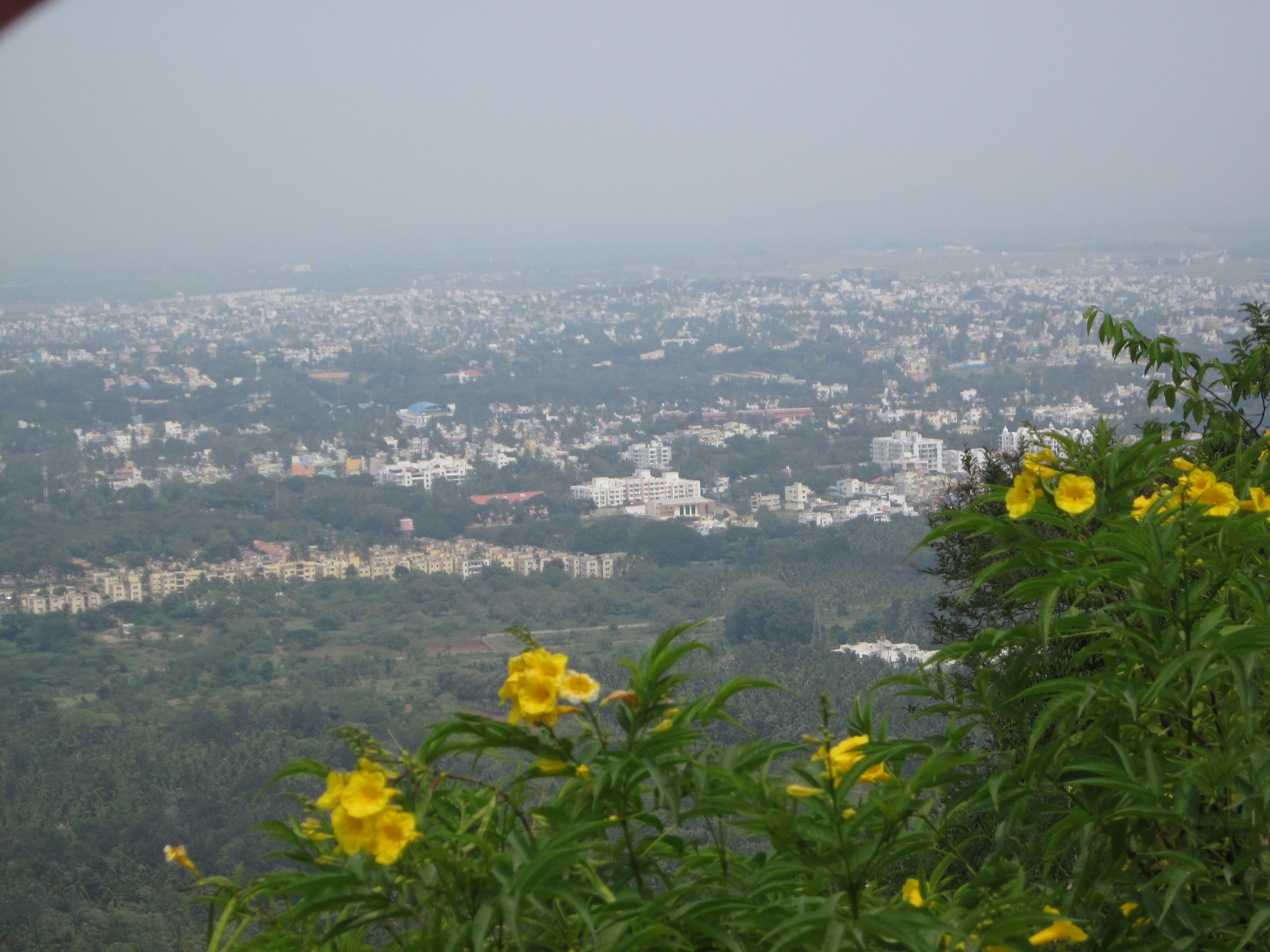
A view from Chamundi hills

Vast flora diversity including 442 species (91 families) of flowering plants provides a best habitate for butterflies. Hill hosts around 150 species of butterflies which contributes to around 10% of butterfly species of India. Given the hills falls between Western Ghats and Eastern Ghats, it acts a Waypoint for Nymphalidae mass migration. Other butterfly species include Blue Tiger, Common Crows, Scarce Shot Silverline and Emigrants.

All Big Four venomous snakes are also found here along with other non-venomous snakes like Oriental rat snake and common trinket snake. Other than snakes, many reptiles also reside here which include the Peninsular rock agama, Mysore day gecko, Bengal monitor, the Indian chameleon and the Oriental garden lizard.

The hill is home to one of the largest population (240, in 2004) of Bonnet macaque (proximity to tourist areas) along with Tufted gray langur and Hanuman langurs (away from tourist spots). Other notable mammals spotted here are Indian leopard, Jungle cat, Black-naped hare, Pangolin and Common palm civet.

== See also ==
- Lalithadripura
- Sacred mountains of India
