= List of birds of Karnataka =

The Indian state of Karnataka has 570 bird species within its boundaries. The following list of birds is based on multiple sources and incorporates recent taxonomic revisions. Species which are considered provisional, introduced or escapees are mentioned, but are not considered in the count.

The birds of some parts of Karnataka have been well studied. Uttara Kannada (known as North Kanara) district was surveyed by James Davidson for five years between 1888 and 1896 (341 species) while parts of this district along with several sites in Belgavi district were covered for three months by Walter Norman Koelz in 1938 (232 species). Salim Ali, in his historic survey of Mysore state (343 species), covered much of southern and central Karnataka and Major Phythian-Adams covered parts of Mysore and provided the only records of several uncommon species. Frederick Nicholson Betts covered Kodagu (Coorg) district, then disjunct from Mysore, and provides good documentation of several birds (279 species) of the Western Ghats. Hence, by 1970, when modern field ornithology and amateur bird-watching were popularised through the Newsletter for Birdwatchers, a moderate level of documentation had taken place in several parts of Karnataka. The only grey area that remained unexplored was the north eastern parts of the state, which was part of the state of Hyderabad then. Salim Ali, during this Hyderabad State Ornithology Survey, could not visit these parts as the survey had to be cut short due to financial challenges. The latest update follows the conventions of the IOC World Bird List, version 11.2, published in 2021.

The following tag has been used to highlight species which are considered accidental. The commonly occurring native species do not fit within any of these categories.

- (A) Accidental - Also known as a rarity, it refers to a species that rarely or accidentally occurs in India-typically less than ten confirmed records.

== Ducks, geese, and swans ==
Order: Anseriformes Family: Anatidae

Anatidae includes the ducks and most duck-like waterfowl, such as geese and swans. These birds are adapted to an aquatic existence with webbed feet, flattened bills, and feathers that are excellent at shedding water due to an oily coating.

- Fulvous whistling duck, Dendrocygna bicolor
- Lesser whistling duck, Dendrocygna javanica
- Bar-headed goose, Anser indicus
- Greylag goose, Anser anser
- Greater white-fronted goose, Anser albifrons
- Knob-billed duck, Sarkidiornis melanotos
- Ruddy shelduck, Tadorna ferruginea
- Cotton pygmy goose, Nettapus coromandelianus
- Garganey, Spatula querquedula
- Northern shoveler, Spatula clypeata
- Gadwall, Mareca strepera
- Eurasian wigeon, Mareca penelope
- Indian spot-billed duck, Anas poecilorhyncha
- Mallard, Anas platyrhynchos (A)
- Northern pintail, Anas acuta
- Eurasian teal, Anas crecca
- Red-crested pochard, Netta rufina
- Common pochard, Aythya ferina
- Ferruginous duck, Aythya nyroca
- Tufted duck, Aythya fuligula

== Pheasants and allies ==
Order: Galliformes Family: Phasianidae

The Phasianidae are a family of terrestrial birds which consists of quails, partridges, snowcocks, francolins, spurfowls, tragopans, monals, pheasants, peafowls and jungle fowls. In general, they are plump (although they vary in size) and have broad, relatively short wings.

- Painted francolin, Francolinus pictus
- Grey francolin, Francolinus pondicerianus
- Common quail, Coturnix coturnix
- Rain quail, Coturnix coromandelica
- King quail, Excalfactoria chinensis
- Jungle bush quail, Perdicula asiatica
- Rock bush quail, Perdicula argoondah
- Painted bush quail, Perdicula erythrorhyncha
- Red spurfowl, Galloperdix spadicea
- Painted spurfowl, Galloperdix lunulata
- Grey junglefowl, Gallus sonneratii
- Indian peafowl, Pavo cristatus

== Frogmouths ==
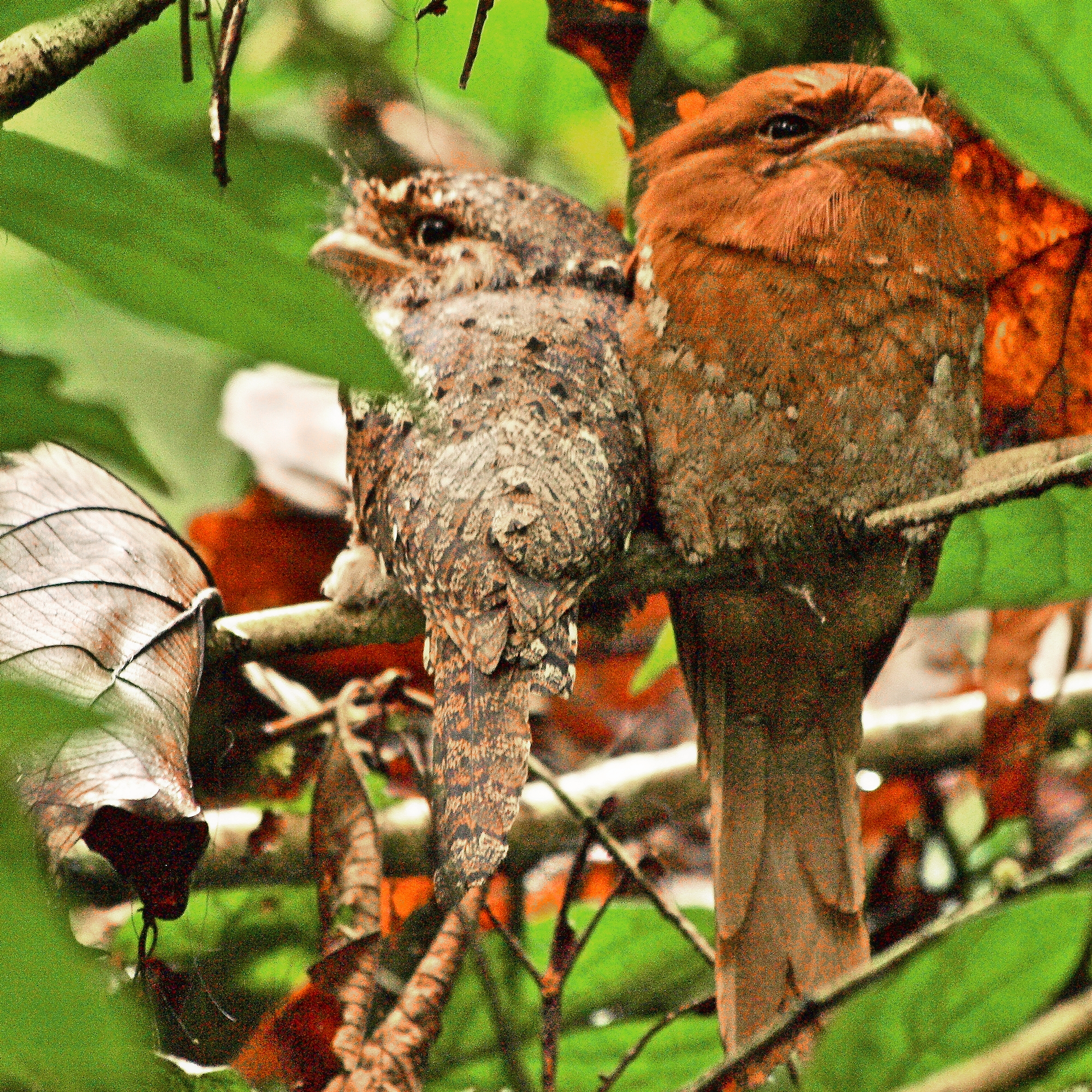
Sri Lanka frogmouths in Salim Ali Bird Sanctuary, Thattekad

Order: Caprimulgiformes Family: Podargidae

The frogmouths are a group of nocturnal birds related to the nightjars. They are named for their large flattened hooked bill and huge frog-like gape, which they use to take insects.

- Sri Lanka frogmouth, Batrachostomus moniliger

== Nightjars ==
Order: Caprimulgiformes Family: Caprimulgidae

Nightjars are medium-sized nocturnal birds that usually nest on the ground. They have long wings, short legs and very short bills. Most have small feet, of little use for walking, and long pointed wings. Their soft plumage is camouflaged to resemble bark or leaves.

- Great eared nightjar, Lyncornis macrotis (A)
- Jungle nightjar, Caprimulgus indicus
- Jerdon's nightjar, Caprimulgus atripennis
- Indian nightjar, Caprimulgus asiaticus
- Savanna nightjar, Caprimulgus affinis

== Treeswifts ==
Order: Apodiformes Family: Hemiprocnidae

The treeswifts, also called crested swifts, are closely related to the true swifts. They differ from the other swifts in that they have crests, long forked tails and softer plumage.

- Crested treeswift, Hemiprocne coronata

== Swifts ==
Order: Apodiformes Family: Apodidae

Swifts are small birds which spend the majority of their lives flying. These birds have very short legs and never settle voluntarily on the ground, perching instead only on vertical surfaces. Many swifts have long swept-back wings which resemble a crescent or boomerang.

- Indian swiftlet, Aerodramus unicolor
- White-rumped spinetail, Zoonavena sylvatica
- Brown-backed needletail, Hirundapus giganteus
- Asian palm swift, Cypsiurus balasiensis
- Alpine swift, Tachymarptis melba
- Common swift, Apus apus
- Blyth's swift, Apus leuconyx
- Little swift, Apus affinis
- House swift, Apus nipalensis

== Bustards ==
Order: Otidiformes Family: Otididae

Bustards are large terrestrial birds mainly associated with dry open country and steppes in the Old World. They are omnivorous and nest on the ground. They walk steadily on strong legs and big toes, pecking for food as they go. They have long broad wings with "fingered" wingtips and striking patterns in flight. Many have interesting mating displays.

- Great Indian bustard, Ardeotis nigriceps
- Lesser florican, Sypheotides indicus (syn. Eupodotis indica)

== Cuckoos ==
Order: Cuculiformes Family: Cuculidae

The family Cuculidae includes cuckoos, roadrunners and anis. These birds are of variable size with slender bodies, long tails and strong legs. Many are brood parasites.

- Greater coucal, Centropus sinensis
- Lesser coucal, Centropus bengalensis
- Sirkeer malkoha, Taccocua leschenaultii
- Blue-faced malkoha, Phaenicophaeus viridirostris
- Chestnut-winged cuckoo, Clamator coromandus
- Jacobin cuckoo, Clamator jacobinus
- Asian koel, Eudynamys scolopaceus
- Banded bay cuckoo, Cacomantis sonneratii
- Grey-bellied cuckoo, Cacomantis passerinus
- Square-tailed drongo-cuckoo, Surniculus lugubris
- Fork-tailed drongo-cuckoo, Surniculus dicruroides
- Large hawk-cuckoo, Hierococcyx sparverioides
- Common hawk-cuckoo, Hierococcyx varius
- Lesser cuckoo, Cuculus poliocephalus
- Indian cuckoo, Cuculus micropterus
- Himalayan cuckoo, Cuculus saturatus
- Common cuckoo, Cuculus canorus

== Sandgrouse ==
Order: Pterocliformes Family: Pteroclidae

Sandgrouse have small, pigeon like heads and necks, but sturdy compact bodies. They have long pointed wings and sometimes tails and a fast direct flight. Flocks fly to watering holes at dawn and dusk. Their legs are feathered down to the toes.

- Chestnut-bellied sandgrouse, Pterocles exustus
- Painted sandgrouse, Pterocles indicus

== Pigeons and doves ==
Order: Columbiformes Family: Columbidae

Pigeons and doves are stout-bodied birds with short necks and short slender bills with a fleshy cere.

- Rock dove, Columba livia
- Nilgiri wood pigeon, Columba elphinstonii
- Oriental turtle dove, Streptopelia orientalis
- Eurasian collared dove, Streptopelia decaocto
- Red collared dove, Streptopelia tranquebarica
- Spotted dove, Spilopelia chinensis
- Laughing dove, Spilopelia senegalensis
- Common emerald dove, Chalcophaps indica
- Orange-breasted green pigeon, Treron bicinctus
- Grey-fronted green pigeon, Treron affinis (in some classifications it is split from Treron pompadora which is resident in Sri Lanka)
- Yellow-footed green pigeon, Treron phoenicopterus
- Green imperial pigeon, Ducula aenea
- Mountain imperial pigeon, Ducula badia

== Rails, crakes, and coots ==
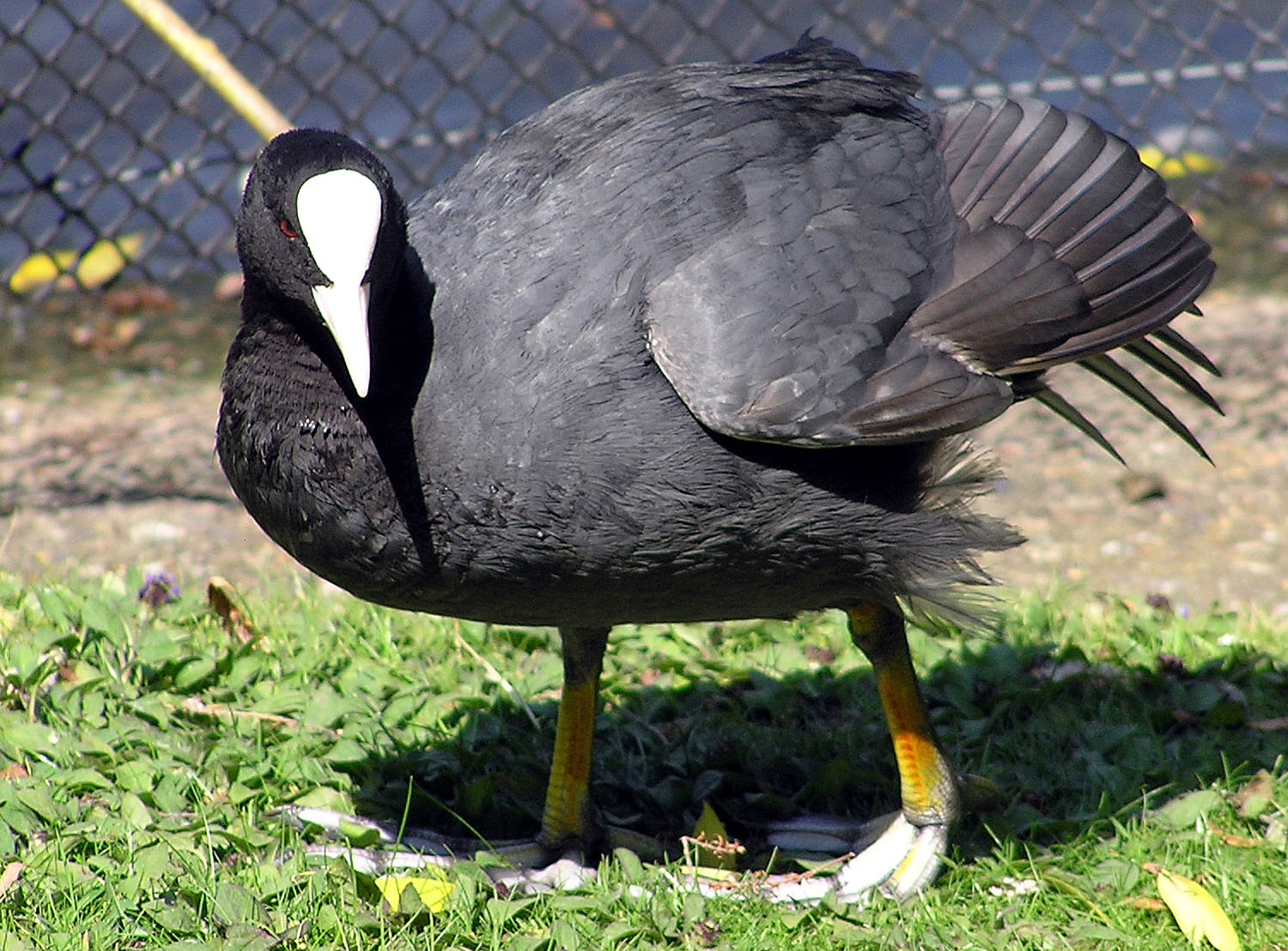
Eurasian coot

Order: Gruiformes Family: Rallidae

Rallidae is a large family of small to medium-sized birds which includes the rails, crakes, coots and gallinules. Typically they inhabit dense vegetation in damp environments near lakes, swamps or rivers. In general they are shy and secretive birds, making them difficult to observe. Most species have strong legs and long toes which are well adapted to soft uneven surfaces. They tend to have short, rounded wings and to be weak fliers.

- Slaty-breasted rail, Lewinia striata
- Spotted crake, Porzana porzana
- Common moorhen, Gallinula chloropus
- Eurasian coot, Fulica atra
- Grey-headed swamphen, Porphyrio poliocephalus
- Ruddy-breasted crake, Zapornia fusca
- Brown crake, Zapornia akool
- Baillon's crake, Zapornia pusilla
- Little crake, Zapornia parva
- Spotted crake, Porzana porzana
- Slaty-legged crake, Rallina eurizonoides
- Watercock, Gallicrex cinerea
- White-breasted waterhen, Amaurornis phoenicurus

== Cranes ==
Order: Gruiformes Family: Gruidae

Cranes are large, long-legged and long-necked birds. Unlike the similar-looking but unrelated herons, cranes fly with necks outstretched, not pulled back. Most have elaborate and noisy courting displays or "dances".

- Demoiselle crane, Anthropoides virgo
- Common crane, Grus grus (A)

== Grebes ==
Order: Podicipediformes Family: Podicipedidae

Grebes are small to medium-large freshwater diving birds. They have lobed toes and are excellent swimmers and divers. However, they have their feet placed far back on the body, making them quite ungainly on land.

- Little grebe, Tachybaptus ruficollis

== Flamingos ==
Order: Phoenicopteriformes Family: Phoenicopteridae

Flamingos are gregarious wading birds, usually 1 to 1.5 metres (3 to 5 ft) tall, found in both the Western and Eastern Hemispheres. Flamingos filter-feed on shellfish and algae. Their oddly shaped beaks are specially adapted to separate mud and silt from the food they consume and, uniquely, are used upside-down.

- Greater flamingo, Phoenicopterus roseus
- Lesser flamingo, Phoenicopterus minor

== Buttonquail ==
Order: Charadriiformes Family: Turnicidae

The buttonquail are small, drab, running birds which resemble the true quails. The female is the brighter of the sexes and initiates courtship. The male incubates the eggs and tends the young.

- Common buttonquail, Turnix sylvaticus
- Yellow-legged buttonquail, Turnix tanki
- Barred buttonquail, Turnix suscitator

== Stone-curlews and thick-knees ==
Order: Charadriiformes Family: Burhinidae

The thick-knees are a group of largely tropical waders in the family Burhinidae. They are found worldwide within the tropical zone, with some species also breeding in temperate Europe and Australia. They are medium to large waders with strong black or yellow-black bills, large yellow eyes and cryptic plumage. Despite being classed as waders, most species have a preference for arid or semi-arid habitats.

- Indian stone-curlew, Burhinus indicus
- Great stone-curlew, Esacus recurvirostris

== Oystercatchers ==
Order: Charadriiformes Family: Haematopodidae

The oystercatchers are large and noisy plover-like birds, with strong bills used for smashing or prising open molluscs.

- Eurasian oystercatcher, Haematopus ostralegus

== Stilts and avocets ==
Order: Charadriiformes Family: Recurvirostridae

Recurvirostridae is a family of large wading birds, which includes the avocets and stilts. The avocets have long legs and long up-curved bills. The stilts have extremely long legs and long, thin, straight bills.

- Black-winged stilt, Himantopus himantopus
- Pied avocet, Recurvirostra avosetta

== Plovers ==
Order: Charadriiformes Family: Charadriidae

The family Charadriidae includes the plovers, dotterels and lapwings. They are small to medium-sized birds with compact bodies, short, thick necks and long, usually pointed, wings. They are found in open country worldwide, mostly in habitats near water.

- Yellow-wattled lapwing, Vanellus malabaricus
- Grey-headed lapwing, Vanellus cinereus
- Red-wattled lapwing, Vanellus indicus
- Sociable lapwing, Vanellus gregarius (A)
- Pacific golden plover, Pluvialis fulva
- Grey plover, Pluvialis squatarola
- Little ringed plover, Charadrius dubius
- Kentish plover, Charadrius alexandrinus
- Lesser sand plover, Charadrius mongolus
- Greater sand plover, Charadrius leschenaultii

== Painted-snipes ==
Order: Charadriiformes Family: Rostratulidae

Painted-snipes are short-legged, long-billed birds similar in shape to the true snipes, but more brightly coloured.

- Greater painted-snipe, Rostratula benghalensis

== Jacanas ==
Order: Charadriiformes Family: Jacanidae

The jacanas are a group of tropical waders in the family Jacanidae. They are found throughout the tropics. They are identifiable by their huge feet and claws which enable them to walk on floating vegetation in the shallow lakes that are their preferred habitat.

- Pheasant-tailed jacana, Hydrophasianus chirurgus
- Bronze-winged jacana, Metopidius indicus

== Sandpipers and snipes ==
Order: Charadriiformes Family: Scolopacidae

Scolopacidae is a large diverse family of small to medium-sized shorebirds including the sandpipers, curlews, godwits, shanks, tattlers, woodcocks, snipes, dowitchers and phalaropes. The majority of these species eat small invertebrates picked out of the mud or soil. Variation in length of legs and bills enables multiple species to feed in the same habitat, particularly on the coast, without direct competition for food.

- Eurasian whimbrel, Numenius phaeopus
- Eurasian curlew, Numenius arquata
- Bar-tailed godwit, Limosa lapponica
- Black-tailed godwit, Limosa limosa
- Ruddy turnstone, Arenaria interpres
- Great knot, Calidris tenuirostris
- Ruff, Calidris pugnax
- Broad-billed sandpiper, Calidris falcinellus
- Curlew sandpiper, Calidris ferruginea
- Temminck's stint, Calidris temminckii
- Sanderling, Calidris alba
- Dunlin, Calidris alpina
- Little stint, Calidris minuta
- Eurasian woodcock, Scolopax rusticola
- Jack snipe, Lymnocryptes minimus
- Wood snipe, Gallinago nemoricola
- Pin-tailed snipe, Gallinago stenura
- Swinhoe's snipe, Gallinago megala
- Great snipe, Gallinago media
- Common snipe, Gallinago gallinago
- Terek sandpiper, Xenus cinereus
- Red-necked phalarope, Phalaropus lobatus
- Common sandpiper, Actitis hypoleucos
- Green sandpiper, Tringa ochropus
- Common redshank, Tringa totanus
- Marsh sandpiper, Tringa stagnatilis
- Wood sandpiper, Tringa glareola
- Spotted redshank, Tringa erythropus
- Common greenshank, Tringa nebularia

== Crab-plover ==
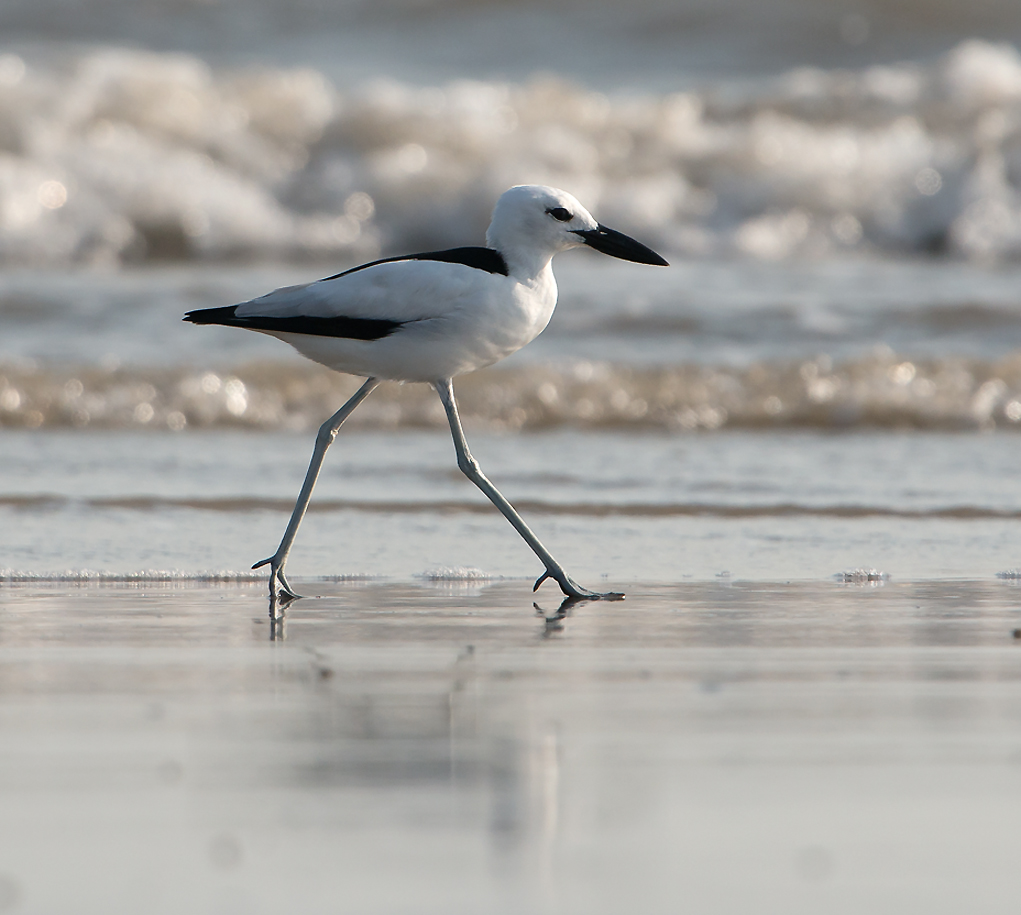
Crab-plover

Order: Charadriiformes Family: Dromadidae

The crab-plover is related to the waders. It resembles a plover but with very long grey legs and a strong heavy black bill similar to a tern. It has black-and-white plumage, a long neck, partially webbed feet and a bill designed for eating crabs.

- Crab-plover, Dromas ardeola

== Coursers and pratincoles ==
Order: Charadriiformes Family: Glareolidae

Glareolidae is a family of wading birds comprising the pratincoles, which have short legs, long pointed wings and long forked tails, and the coursers, which have long legs, short wings and long pointed bills which curve downwards.

- Indian courser, Cursorius coromandelicus
- Jerdon's courser, Rhinoptilus bitorquatus [historic from Kolar]
- Collared pratincole, Glareola pratincola
- Oriental pratincole, Glareola maldivarum
- Small pratincole, Glareola lactea

== Gulls, terns, and skimmers ==
Order: Charadriiformes Family: Laridae

Laridae is a family of medium to large seabirds, the gulls, terns, and skimmers. Gulls are typically grey or white, often with black markings on the head or wings. They have stout, longish bills and webbed feet. Terns are a group of generally medium to large seabirds typically with grey or white plumage, often with black markings on the head. Most terns hunt fish by diving but some pick insects off the surface of fresh water. Gulls and terns are generally long-lived birds, with several species known to live in excess of 30 years.

- Brown noddy, Anous stolidus
- Indian skimmer, Rynchops albicollis
- Slender-billed gull, Chroicocephalus genei
- Brown-headed gull, Chroicocephalus brunnicephalus
- Black-headed gull, Chroicocephalus ridibundus
- Pallas's gull, Ichthyaetus ichthyaetus
- White-eyed gull, Ichthyaetus leucophthalmus (A)
- Sooty gull, Ichthyaetus hemprichii (A)
- Lesser black-backed gull Larus fuscus
- Gull-billed tern, Gelochelidon nilotica
- Caspian tern, Hydroprogne caspia
- Greater crested tern, Thalasseus bergii
- Lesser crested tern, Thalasseus bengalensis
- Sandwich tern, Thalasseus sandvicensis
- Little tern, Sternula albifrons
- Bridled tern, Onychoprion anaethetus
- Sooty tern, Onychoprion fuscatus
- River tern, Sterna aurantia
- Common tern, Sterna hirundo
- Black-bellied tern, Sterna acuticauda
- Whiskered tern, Chlidonias hybrida
- White-winged tern, Chlidonias leucopterus
- Black tern, Chlidonias niger (A)

== Skuas ==
Order: Charadriiformes Family: Stercorariidae

The family Stercorariidae are, in general, medium to large birds, typically with grey or brown plumage, often with white markings on the wings. They nest on the ground in temperate and arctic regions and are long-distance migrants.

- South polar skua, Catharacta maccorkmicki
- Pomarine skua, Stercorarius pomarinus
- Arctic skua, Stercorarius parasiticus
- Long-tailed skua, Stercorarius longicaudus (A)

== Tropicbirds ==
Order: Phaethontiformes Family: Phaethontidae

Tropicbirds are slender white birds of tropical oceans, with exceptionally long central tail feathers. Their heads and long wings have black markings.

- Red-billed tropicbird, Phaethon aethereus

== Austral storm petrels ==
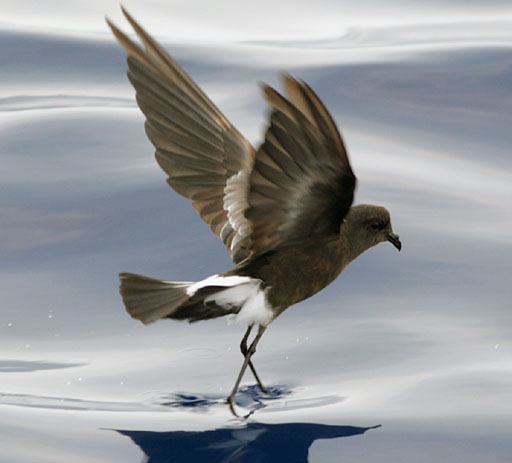
Wilson's storm petrel

Order: Procellariiformes Family: Oceanitidae

The storm petrels are relatives of the petrels and are the smallest seabirds. They feed on planktonic crustaceans and small fish picked from the surface, typically while hovering. The flight is fluttering and sometimes bat-like.

- Wilson's storm petrel, Oceanites oceanicus
- White-faced storm petrel, Pelagodroma marina (A)

== Northern storm petrels ==
Order: Procellariiformes Family: Hydrobatidae

- Swinhoe's storm petrel, Hydrobates monorhis

== Petrels, shearwaters, and diving petrels ==
Order: Procellariiformes Family: Procellariidae

The procellariids are the main group of medium-sized "true petrels", characterised by united nostrils with medium septum and a long outer functional primary.

- Flesh-footed shearwater, Puffinus carneipes
- Persian shearwater, Puffinus persicus and often included as that species
- Jouanin's petrel, Bulweria fallax

== Storks ==
Order: Ciconiiformes Family: Ciconiidae

Storks are large, long-legged, long-necked, wading birds with long, stout bills. Storks are mute, but bill-clattering is an important mode of communication at the nest. Their nests can be large and may be reused for many years. Many species are migratory.

- Painted stork, Mycteria leucocephala
- Asian openbill, Anastomus oscitans
- Black stork, Ciconia nigra
- Woolly-necked stork, Ciconia episcopus
- White stork, Ciconia ciconia
- Lesser adjutant, Leptoptilos javanicus

== Frigatebirds ==
Order: Suliformes Family: Fregatidae

Frigatebirds are large seabirds usually found over tropical oceans. They are large, black-and-white or completely black, with long wings and deeply forked tails. The males have coloured inflatable throat pouches. They do not swim or walk and cannot take off from a flat surface. Having the largest wingspan-to-body-weight ratio of any bird, they are essentially aerial, able to stay aloft for more than a week.

- Great frigatebird, Fregeta minor [One storm-blown record from Bijapur]
- Christmas frigatebird, Fregata andrewsi (A)
- Lesser frigatebird, Fregata ariel [An inland storm-blown record from Ranganathittu]

== Gannets and boobies ==
Order: Suliformes Family: Sulidae

The sulids comprise the gannets and boobies. Both groups are medium to large coastal seabirds that plunge-dive for fish.

- Masked booby, Sula dactylatra
- Red-footed booby, Sula sula
- Brown booby, Sula leucogaster [A specimen from Karwar in BNHS collected by G. Monteith, I.C.S. probably in 1916 ]

== Anhingas and darters ==
Order: Suliformes Family: Anhingidae

Anhingas and darters are often called "snake-birds" because of their long thin neck, which gives a snake-like appearance when they swim with their bodies submerged. The males have black and dark-brown plumage, an erectile crest on the nape and a larger bill than the female. The females have much paler plumage especially on the neck and underparts. The darters have completely webbed feet and their legs are short and set far back on the body. Their plumage is somewhat permeable, like that of cormorants, and they spread their wings to dry after diving.

- Oriental darter, Anhinga melanogaster

== Cormorants and shags ==
Order: Suliformes Family: Phalacrocoracidae

Phalacrocoracidae is a family of medium to large coastal, fish-eating seabirds that includes cormorants and shags. Plumage colouration varies, with the majority having mainly dark plumage, some species being black-and-white and a few being colourful.

- Little cormorant, Microcarbo niger
- Indian cormorant, Phalacrocorax fuscicollis
- Great cormorant, Phalacrocorax carbo

== Ibises and spoonbills ==
Order: Pelecaniformes Family: Threskiornithidae

Threskiornithidae is a family of large terrestrial and wading birds which includes the ibises and spoonbills. They have long, broad wings with 11 primary and about 20 secondary feathers. They are strong fliers and despite their size and weight, very capable soarers.

- Black-headed ibis, Threskiornis melanocephalus
- Red-naped ibis, Pseudibis papillosa
- Glossy ibis, Plegadis falcinellus
- Eurasian spoonbill, Platalea leucorodia

== Herons and bitterns ==
Order: Pelecaniformes Family: Ardeidae

The family Ardeidae contains the bitterns, herons and egrets. Herons and egrets are medium to large wading birds with long necks and legs. Bitterns tend to be shorter necked and more wary. Members of Ardeidae fly with their necks retracted, unlike other long-necked birds such as storks, ibises and spoonbills.

- Eurasian bittern, Botaurus stellaris
- Little bittern, Ixobrychus minutes
- Yellow bittern, Ixobrychus sinensis
- Cinnamon bittern, Ixobrychus cinnamomeus
- Black bittern, Ixobrychus flavicollis
- Malayan night heron, Gorsachius melanolophus
- Black-crowned night heron, Nycticorax nycticorax
- Striated heron, Butorides striata
- Indian pond heron, Ardeola grayii
- Eastern cattle egret, Bubulcus coromandus
- Grey heron, Ardea cinerea
- Purple heron, Ardea purpurea
- Great egret, Ardea alba
- Intermediate egret, Ardea intermedia
- Little egret, Egretta garzetta
- Western reef heron, Egretta gularis

== Pelicans ==
Order: Pelecaniformes Family: Pelecanidae

Pelicans are large water birds with a distinctive pouch under their beak. As with other members of the order Pelecaniformes, they have webbed feet with four toes.

- Great white pelican, Pelecanus onocrotalus (A)
- Spot-billed pelican, Pelecanus philippensis

== Osprey ==
Order: Accipitriformes Family: Pandionidae

The family Pandionidae contains usually only one species, the osprey. The osprey is a medium-large raptor which is a specialist fish-eater.

- Osprey, Pandion haliaetus

== Kites, hawks, and eagles ==
Order: Accipitriformes Family: Accipitridae

Accipitridae is a family of birds of prey, which includes hawks, eagles, kites, harriers and Old World vultures. These birds have powerful hooked beaks for tearing flesh from their prey, strong legs, powerful talons and keen eyesight.

- Black-winged kite, Elanus caeruleus
- Egyptian vulture, Neophron percnopterus
- Crested honey buzzard, Pernis ptilorhynchus
- Jerdon's baza, Aviceda jerdoni
- Black baza, Aviceda leuphotes
- White-rumped vulture, Gyps bengalensis
- Indian vulture, Gyps indicus
- Himalayan vulture, Gyps himalayensis
- Griffon vulture, Gyps fulvus
- Red-headed vulture, Sarcogyps calvus
- Cinereous vulture, Aegypius monachus (A)
- Crested serpent eagle, Spilornis cheela
- Short-toed snake eagle, Circaetus gallicus
- Changeable hawk-eagle, Nisaetus cirrhatus
- Mountain hawk-eagle, Nisaetus nipalensis
- Legge's hawk-eagle, Nisaetus kelaarti
- Rufous-bellied eagle, Lophotriorchis kienerii
- Black eagle, Ictinaetus malaiensis
- Indian spotted eagle, Clanga hastata
- Greater spotted eagle, Clanga clanga
- Booted eagle, Hieraaetus pennatus
- Tawny eagle, Aquila rapax
- Steppe eagle, Aquila nipalensis
- Eastern imperial eagle, Aquila heliaca
- Bonelli's eagle, Aquila fasciata
- Crested goshawk, Accipiter trivirgatus
- Shikra, Accipiter badius
- Besra, Accipiter virgatus
- Eurasian sparrowhawk, Accipiter nisus
- Western marsh harrier, Circus aeruginosus
- Eastern marsh harrier, Circus spilonotus (A)
- Hen harrier, Circus cyaneus
- Pallid harrier, Circus macrourus
- Pied harrier, Circus melanoleucos
- Montagu's harrier, Circus pygargus
- Black kite, Milvus migrans
- Brahminy kite, Haliastur indus
- White-bellied sea eagle, Haliaeetus leucogaster
- Lesser fish eagle, Haliaeetus humilis
- Grey-headed fish eagle, Haliaeetus ichthyaetus
- White-eyed buzzard, Butastur teesa
- Long-legged buzzard, Buteo rufinus
- Common buzzard, Buteo buteo

== Barn owls ==
Order: Strigiformes Family: Tytonidae

Barn owls are medium to large owls with large heads and characteristic heart-shaped faces. They have long strong legs with powerful talons.

- Eastern barn owl, Tyto javanica
- Eastern grass owl, Tyto longimembris
- Sri Lanka bay owl, Phodilus assimilis (strictly Western Ghats race ripleyi),

== Owls ==
Order: Strigiformes Family: Strigidae

The typical owls are small to large solitary nocturnal birds of prey. They have large forward-facing eyes and ears, a hawk-like beak and a conspicuous circle of feathers around each eye called a facial disk.

- Indian scops owl, Otus bakkamoena
- Pallid scops owl, Otus brucei (A)
- Oriental scops owl, Otus sunia
- Indian eagle-owl, Bubo bengalensis
- Spot-bellied eagle-owl, Bubo nipalensis
- Brown fish owl, Ketupa zeylonensis
- Mottled wood owl, Strix ocellata
- Brown wood owl, Strix leptogrammica
- Jungle owlet, Glaucidium radiatum
- Spotted owlet, Athene brama
- Brown boobook, Ninox scutulata
- Short-eared owl, Asio flammeus

== Trogons ==
Order: Trogoniformes Family: Trogonidae

The family Trogonidae includes trogons and quetzals. Found in tropical woodlands worldwide, they feed on insects and fruit, and their broad bills and weak legs reflect their diet and arboreal habits. Although their flight is fast, they are reluctant to fly any distance. Trogons have soft, often colourful, feathers with distinctive male and female plumage.

- Malabar trogon, Harpactes fasciatus

== Hoopoes ==
Order: Bucerotiformes Family: Upupidae

Hoopoes have black, white and orangey-pink colouring with a large erectile crest on their head.

- Eurasian hoopoe, Upupa epops

== Hornbills ==
Order: Bucerotiformes Family: Bucerotidae

Hornbills are a group of birds whose bill is shaped like a cow's horn, but without a twist, sometimes with a casque on the upper mandible. Frequently, the bill is brightly coloured.

- Great hornbill, Buceros bicornis
- Malabar pied hornbill, Anthracoceros coronatus
- Malabar grey hornbill, Ocyceros griseus
- Indian grey hornbill, Ocyceros birostris

== Rollers ==
Order: Coraciiformes Family: Coraciidae

Rollers resemble crows in size and build, but are more closely related to the kingfishers and bee-eaters. They share the colourful appearance of those groups with blues and browns predominating. The two inner front toes are connected, but the outer toe is not.

- Indian roller, Coracias benghalensis
- European roller, Coracias garrulus
- Oriental dollarbird, Eurystomus orientalis

== Kingfishers ==
Order: Coraciiformes Family: Alcedinidae

Kingfishers are medium-sized birds with large heads, long pointed bills, short legs and stubby tails.

- Stork-billed kingfisher, Pelargopsis capensis
- White-throated kingfisher, Halcyon smyrnensis
- Black-capped kingfisher, Halcyon pileata
- Blue-eared kingfisher, Alcedo meninting
- Common kingfisher, Alcedo atthis
- Oriental dwarf kingfisher, Ceyx erithaca
- Pied kingfisher, Ceryle rudis

== Bee-eaters ==
Order: Coraciiformes Family: Meropidae

The bee-eaters are a group of near passerine birds in the family Meropidae. Most species are found in Africa but others occur in southern Europe, Madagascar, Australia and New Guinea. They are characterised by richly coloured plumage, slender bodies and usually elongated central tail feathers. All are colourful and have long downturned bills and pointed wings, which give them a swallow-like appearance when seen from afar.

- Blue-bearded bee-eater, Nyctyornis athertoni
- Asian green bee-eater, Merops orientalis
- Blue-cheeked bee-eater, Merops persicus
- Blue-tailed bee-eater, Merops philippinus
- Chestnut-headed bee-eater, Merops leschenaulti
- European bee-eater, Merops apiaster

== Asian barbets ==
Order: Piciformes Family: Megalaimidae

The barbets are plump birds, with short necks and large heads. They get their name from the bristles which fringe their heavy bills. Most species are brightly coloured.

- Brown-headed barbet, Psilopogon zeylanicus
- White-cheeked barbet, Psilopogon viridis
- Malabar barbet, Psilopogon malabaricus (Western Ghats only, split by Rasmussen and Anderton (2005) with the crimson-fronted barbet, Psilopogon rubricapillus referring to the Sri Lankan species )
- Coppersmith barbet, Psilopogon haemacephalus

== Woodpeckers ==
Order: Piciformes Family: Picidae

Woodpeckers are small to medium-sized birds with chisel-like beaks, short legs, stiff tails and long tongues used for capturing insects. Some species have feet with two toes pointing forward and two backward, while several species have only three toes. Many woodpeckers have the habit of tapping noisily on tree trunks with their beaks.

- Eurasian wryneck, Jynx torquilla
- Speckled piculet, Picumnus innominatus
- Heart-spotted woodpecker, Hemicircus canente
- Brown-capped pygmy woodpecker, Yungipicus nanus
- Yellow-crowned woodpecker, Leiopicus mahrattensis
- White-bellied woodpecker, Dryocopus javensis
- Lesser yellownape, Picus chlorolophus
- Streak-throated woodpecker, Picus xanthopygaeus
- Common flameback, Dinopium javanense
- Black-rumped flameback, Dinopium benghalense
- Malabar flameback, Chrysocolaptes socialis
- White-naped woodpecker, Chrysocolaptes festivus
- Rufous woodpecker, Micropternus brachyurus

== Caracaras and falcons ==
Order: Falconiformes Family: Falconidae

Falconidae is a family of diurnal birds of prey. They differ from hawks, eagles and kites in that they kill with their beaks instead of their talons.

- Lesser kestrel, Falco naumanni
- Common kestrel, Falco tinnunculus
- Red-necked falcon, Falco chiquera
- Amur falcon, Falco amurensis
- Eurasian hobby, Falco subbuteo
- Laggar falcon, Falco jugger
- Peregrine falcon, Falco peregrinus

== Old World parrots ==
Order: Psittaciformes Family: Psittaculidae

Characteristic features of parrots include a strong curved bill, an upright stance, strong legs, and clawed zygodactyl feet. Many parrots are vividly coloured, and some are multi-coloured. In size they range from 8 cm (3.1 in) to 1 m (3.3 ft) in length. Old World parrots are found from Africa east across south and southeast Asia and Oceania to Australia and New Zealand.

- Plum-headed parakeet, Psittacula cyanocephala
- Blue-winged parakeet, Psittacula columboides
- Alexandrine parakeet, Psittacula eupatria
- Rose-ringed parakeet, Psittacula krameri
- Red-breasted parakeet, Psittacula alexandri [escapees]
- Vernal hanging parrot, Loriculus vernalis

== Pittas ==
Order: Passeriformes Family: Pittidae

Pittas are medium-sized by passerine standards and are stocky, with fairly long, strong legs, short tails and stout bills. Many are brightly coloured. They spend the majority of their time on wet forest floors, eating snails, insects and similar invertebrates.

- Indian pitta, Pitta brachyura

== Vangas, helmetshrikes, woodshrikes, and shrike-flycatchers. ==
Order: Passeriformes Family: Vangidae

The woodshrikes are similar in build to the shrikes.

- Bar-winged flycatcher-shrike, Hemipus picatus
- Large woodshrike, Tephrodornis gularis
- Malabar woodshrike, Tephrodornis sylvicola
- Common woodshrike, Tephrodornis pondicerianus

== Woodswallows, butcherbirds, and peltops ==
Order: Passeriformes Family: Artamidae

The woodswallows are soft-plumaged, somber-coloured passerine birds. They are smooth, agile flyers with moderately large, semi-triangular wings.

- Ashy woodswallow, Artamus fuscus

== Ioras ==
Order: Passeriformes Family: Aegithinidae

The ioras are bulbul-like birds of open forest or thorn scrub, but whereas that group tends to be drab in colouration, ioras are sexually dimorphic, with the males being brightly plumaged in yellows and greens.

- Common iora, Aegithina tiphia
- Marshall's iora, Aegithina nigrolutea

== Cuckooshrikes ==
Order: Passeriformes Family: Campephagidae

The cuckooshrikes are small to medium-sized passerine birds. They are predominantly greyish with white and black, although some species are brightly coloured.

- White-bellied minivet, Pericrocotus erythropygius
- Small minivet, Pericrocotus cinnamomeus
- Orange minivet, Pericrocotus flammeus
- Ashy minivet, Pericrocotus divaricatus
- Swinhoe's minivet, Pericrocotus cantonensis (A)
- Rosy minivet, Pericrocotus roseus
- Large cuckooshrike, Coracina macei
- Black-winged cuckooshrike, Lalage melaschistos
- Black-headed cuckooshrike, Lalage melanoptera

== Shrikes ==
Order: Passeriformes Family: Laniidae Shrikes are passerine birds known for their habit of catching other birds and small animals and impaling the uneaten portions of their bodies on thorns. A typical shrike's beak is hooked, like a bird of prey.

- Brown shrike, Lanius cristatus
- Isabelline shrike, Lanius isabellinus
- Bay-backed shrike, Lanius vittatus
- Long-tailed shrike, Lanius schach
- Great grey shrike, Lanius excubitor

== Figbirds, orioles, and turnagra ==
Order: Passeriformes Family: Oriolidae

The Old World orioles are colourful passerine birds. They are not related to the New World orioles.

- Black-hooded oriole, Oriolus xanthornus
- Indian golden oriole, Oriolus kundoo)
- Black-naped oriole, Oriolus chinensis

== Drongos ==
Order: Passeriformes Family: Dicruridae

The drongos are mostly black or dark grey in colour, sometimes with metallic tints. They have long forked tails, and some Asian species have elaborate tail decorations. They have short legs and sit very upright when perched, like a shrike. They flycatch or take prey from the ground.

- Bronzed drongo, Dicrurus aeneus
- Greater racket-tailed drongo, Dicrurus paradiseus
- Hair-crested drongo, Dicrurus hottentottus
- Ashy drongo, Dicrurus leucophaeus
- White-bellied drongo, Dicrurus caerulescens
- Black drongo, Dicrurus macrocercus

== Fantails and silktails ==
Order: Passeriformes Family: Rhipiduridae

The fantails are small insectivorous birds which are specialist aerial feeders.

- White-throated fantail, Rhipidura albicollis
- White-spotted fantail, Rhipidura albogularis
- White-browed fantail, Rhipidura aureola

== Monarchs ==
Order: Passeriformes Family: Monarchidae

The monarch flycatchers are small to medium-sized insectivorous passerines which hunt by flycatching.

- Black-naped monarch, Hypothymis azurea
- Indian paradise flycatcher, Terpsiphone paradisi

== Crows and jays ==
Order: Passeriformes Family: Corvidae

The family Corvidae includes crows, ravens, jays, choughs, magpies, treepies, nutcrackers and ground jays. Corvids are above average in size among the Passeriformes, and some of the larger species show high levels of intelligence.

- Rufous treepie, Dendrocitta vagabunda
- White-bellied treepie, Dendrocitta leucogastra
- House crow, Corvus splendens
- Large-billed crow, Corvus macrorhynchos
- Eastern jungle crow, Corvus levaillantii
- Indian jungle crow, Corvus culminatus

== Fairy flycatchers ==
Order: Passeriformes Family: Stenostiridae

Most of the species of this small family are found in Africa, though a few inhabit tropical Asia. They are not closely related to other birds called "flycatchers".

- Grey-headed canary-flycatcher, Culicicapa ceylonensis

== Tits and chickadees ==
Order: Passeriformes Family: Paridae

The Paridae are mainly small stocky woodland species with short stout bills. Some have crests. They are adaptable birds, with a mixed diet including seeds and insects.

- Cinereous tit, Parus cinereus
- White-naped tit, Parus nuchalis
- Indian black-lored tit, Parus aplonotus

== Larks ==
Order: Passeriformes Family: Alaudidae

Larks are small terrestrial birds with often extravagant songs and display flights. Most larks are fairly dull in appearance. Their food is insects and seeds.

- Rufous-tailed lark, Ammomanes phoenicura
- Ashy-crowned sparrow-lark, Eremopterix griseus
- Singing bush lark, Mirafra cantillans
- Indian bush lark, Mirafra erythroptera
- Jerdon's bush lark, Mirafra affinis
- Oriental skylark, Alauda gulgula
- Sykes's lark, Galerida deva
- Malabar lark, Galerida malabarica
- Mongolian short-toed lark, Calandrella dukhunensis
- Greater short-toed lark, Calandrella brachydactyla
- Turkestan short-toed lark, Alaudala heinei

== Bulbuls ==
Order: Passeriformes Family: Pycnonotidae

Bulbuls are medium-sized songbirds. Some are colourful with yellow, red or orange vents, cheeks, throats or supercilia, but most are drab, with uniform olive-brown to black plumage. Some species have distinct crests.

- Yellow-browed bulbul, Acritillas indica
- Black bulbul, Hypsipetes leucocephalus
- Square-tailed bulbul, Hypsipetes ganeesa
- Grey-headed bulbul, Brachypodius priocephalus
- Flame-throated bulbul, Rubigula gularis
- White-browed bulbul, Pycnonotus luteolus
- Yellow-throated bulbul, Pycnonotus xantholaemus
- Red-whiskered bulbul, Pycnonotus jocosus
- Red-vented bulbul, Pycnonotus cafer

== Swallows and martins ==
Order: Passeriformes Family: Hirundinidae

The family Hirundinidae is adapted to aerial feeding. They have a slender streamlined body, long pointed wings and a short bill with a wide gape. The feet are adapted to perching rather than walking, and the front toes are partially joined at the base.

- Grey-throated martin, Riparia chinensis
- Sand martin, Riparia riparia ]
- Barn swallow, Hirundo rustica
- Pacific swallow, Hirundo tahitica
- Hill swallow, Hirundo domicola
- Wire-tailed swallow, Hirundo smithii
- Eurasian crag martin, Ptyonoprogne rupestris
- Dusky crag martin, Ptyonoprogne concolor
- Common house martin, Delichon urbicum
- Eastern red-rumped swallow, Cecropis daurica
- Streak-throated swallow, Petrochelidon fluvicola

== Leaf warblers and allies ==
Order: Passeriformes Family: Phylloscopidae

Leaf warblers are a family of small insectivorous birds found mostly in Eurasia and ranging into Wallacea and Africa. The species are of various sizes, often green-plumaged above and yellow below, or more subdued with greyish-green to greyish-brown colours.

- Hume's leaf warbler, Phylloscopus humei
- Yellow-browed warbler, Phylloscopus inornatus
- Tytler's leaf warbler, Phylloscopus tytleri
- Sulphur-bellied warbler, Phylloscopus griseolus
- Tickell's leaf warbler, Phylloscopus affinis
- Mountain chiffchaff, Phylloscopus sindianus
- Common chiffchaff, Phylloscopus collybita
- Green warbler, Phylloscopus nitidus
- Greenish warbler, Phylloscopus trochiloides
- Large-billed leaf warbler, Phylloscopus magnirostris
- Western crowned warbler, Phylloscopus occipitalis

== Reed warblers, Grauer's warbler, & allies ==
Order: Passeriformes Family: Acrocephalidae

The members of this family are usually rather large for "warblers". Most are rather plain olivaceous brown above with much yellow to beige below. They are usually found in open woodland, reedbeds, or tall grass. The family occurs mostly in southern to western Eurasia and surroundings, but it also ranges far into the Pacific, with some species in Africa.

- Clamorous reed warbler, Acrocephalus stentoreus
- Paddyfield warbler, Acrocephalus agricola
- Blyth's reed warbler, Acrocephalus dumetorum
- Thick-billed warbler, Arundinax aedon
- Booted warbler, Iduna caligata
- Sykes's warbler, Iduna rama

== Grassbirds & allies ==
Order: Passeriformes Family: Locustellidae

Locustellidae are a family of small insectivorous songbirds found mainly in Eurasia, Africa, and the Australian region. They are smallish birds with tails that are usually long and pointed, and tend to be drab brownish or buffy all over.

- Pallas's grasshopper warbler, Helopsaltes certhiola
- Common grasshopper warbler, Locustella naevia
- Broad-tailed grassbird, Schoenicola platyurus
- Bristled grassbird, Schoenicola striatus

== Cisticolas and allies ==
Order: Passeriformes Family: Cisticolidae

The Cisticolidae are warblers found mainly in warmer southern regions of the Old World. They are generally very small birds of drab brown or grey appearance found in open country such as grassland or scrub.

- Zitting cisticola, Cisticola juncidis
- Golden-headed cisticola, Cisticola exilis
- Rufous-fronted prinia, Prinia buchanani
- Grey-breasted prinia, Prinia hodgsonii
- Jungle prinia, Prinia sylvatica
- Ashy prinia, Prinia socialis
- Plain prinia, Prinia inornata
- Common tailorbird, Orthotomus sutorius

== Sylviid babblers ==
Order: Passeriformes Family: Sylviidae

The family Sylviidae is a group of small insectivorous passerine birds. They mainly occur as breeding species, as the common name implies, in Europe, Asia and, to a lesser extent, Africa. Most are of generally undistinguished appearance, but many have distinctive songs.

- Lesser whitethroat, Curruca curruca
- Hume's whitethroat, Curruca althaea
- Eastern Orphean warbler, Curruca crassirostris

== Parrotbills and allies ==
Order: Passeriformes Family: Paradoxornithidae

The parrotbills are a group of peculiar birds native to East and Southeast Asia, though feral populations exist elsewhere. They are generally small, long-tailed birds which inhabit reedbeds and similar habitat. They feed mainly on seeds, e.g. of grasses, to which their bill, as the name implies, is well-adapted

- Yellow-eyed babbler, Chrysomma sinense

== White-eyes ==
Order: Passeriformes Family: Zosteropidae

The white-eyes are small and mostly undistinguished, their plumage above being generally some dull colour like greenish-olive, but some species have a white or bright yellow throat, breast or lower parts, and several have buff flanks. As their name suggests, many species have a white ring around each eye.

- Indian white-eye, Zosterops palpebrosus

== Babblers and scimitar babblers ==
Order: Passeriformes Family: Timaliidae

The babblers, or timaliids, are somewhat diverse in size and colouration, but are characterised by soft fluffy plumage.

- Tawny-bellied babbler, Dumetia hyperythra
- Dark-fronted babbler, Dumetia atriceps
- Pin-striped tit-babbler, Mixornis gularis [historic, in Nagarahole]
- White-browed scimitar babbler, Pomatorhinus schisticeps
- Indian scimitar babbler, Pomatorhinus horsfieldii

== Ground babblers ==
Order: Passeriformes Family: Pellorneidae

These small to medium-sized songbirds have soft fluffy plumage but are otherwise rather diverse. Members of the genus Illadopsis are found in forests, but some other genera are birds of scrublands.

- Puff-throated babbler, Pellorneum ruficeps

== Alcippe fulvettas ==
Order: Passeriformes Family: Alcippeidae

The genus once included many other fulvettas and was previously placed in families Pellorneidae or Timaliidae.

- Brown-cheeked fulvetta, Alcippe poioicephala

== Laughingthrushes and allies ==
Order: Passeriformes Family: Leiothrichidae

The members of this family are diverse in size and colouration, though those of genus Turdoides tend to be brown or greyish. The family is found in Africa, India, and southeast Asia.

- Banasura laughingthrush, Montecincla jerdoni
- Nilgiri laughingthrush, Montecincla cachinnans
- Large grey babbler, Argya malcolmi
- Rufous babbler, Argya subrufa
- Jungle babbler, Argya striata
- Yellow-billed babbler, Argya affinis
- Common babbler, Argya caudata
- Wayanad laughingthrush, Pterorhinus delesserti

== Fairy-bluebirds ==
Order: Passeriformes Family: Irenidae

The fairy-bluebirds are bulbul-like birds of open forest or thorn scrub. The males are dark-blue and the females a duller green.

- Asian fairy-bluebird, Irena puella

== Nuthatches ==
Order: Passeriformes Family: Sittidae

Nuthatches are small woodland birds. They have the unusual ability to climb down trees head first, unlike other birds which can only go upwards. Nuthatches have big heads, short tails and powerful bills and feet.

- Velvet-fronted nuthatch, Sitta frontalis
- Indian nuthatch, Sitta castanea
- Chestnut-bellied nuthatch, Sitta cinnamoventris

== Starlings and rhabdornis ==
Order: Passeriformes Family: Sturnidae

Starlings are small to medium-sized passerine birds. Their flight is strong and direct and they are very gregarious. Their preferred habitat is fairly open country. They eat insects and fruit. Plumage is typically dark with a metallic sheen.

- Common hill myna, Gracula religiosa
- Southern hill myna, Gracula indica
- Jungle myna, Acridotheres fuscus
- Common myna, Acridotheres tristis
- Indian pied myna, Gracupica contra
- Chestnut-tailed starling, Sturnia malabarica
- Malabar starling, Sturnia blythii
- Brahminy starling, Sturnia pagodarum
- Rosy starling, Pastor roseus
- Common starling, Sturnus vulgaris

== Thrushes ==
Order: Passeriformes Family: Turdidae

The thrushes are a group of passerine birds that occur mainly in the Old World. They are plump, soft plumaged, small to medium-sized insectivores or sometimes omnivores, often feeding on the ground. Many have attractive songs.

- Pied thrush, Geokichla wardii
- Orange-headed thrush, Geokichla citrina
- Nilgiri thrush, Zoothera neilgherriensis
- Tickell's thrush, Turdus unicolor
- Indian blackbird, Turdus simillimus
- Eyebrowed thrush, Turdus obscurus
- Red-throated thrush, Turdus ruficollis

== Chats and Old World flycatchers ==
Order: Passeriformes Family: Muscicapidae

Old World flycatchers are a large group of small passerine birds native to the Old World. They are mainly small arboreal insectivores. The appearance of these birds is highly varied, but they mostly have weak songs and harsh calls.

- Indian robin, Copsychus fulicatus
- Oriental magpie-robin, Copsychus saularis
- White-rumped shama, Copsychus malabaricus
- Spotted flycatcher, Muscicapa striata
- Dark-sided flycatcher, Muscicapa sibirica
- Asian brown flycatcher, Muscicapa dauurica
- Brown-breasted flycatcher, Muscicapa muttui
- White-bellied blue flycatcher, Cyornis pallidipes
- Tickell's blue flycatcher, Cyornis tickelliae
- Blue-throated blue flycatcher, Cyornis rubeculoides
- Blue-and-white flycatcher, Cyanoptila cyanomelana (A)
- Verditer flycatcher, Eumyias thalassinus
- Nilgiri flycatcher, Eumyias albicaudatus
- Indian blue robin, Larvivora brunnea
- Bluethroat, Luscinia svecica
- Siberian rubythroat, Calliope calliope (A)
- Nilgiri blue robin, Sholicola major
- Malabar whistling thrush, Myophonus horsfieldii
- Yellow-rumped flycatcher, Ficedula zanthopygia (A)
- Ultramarine flycatcher, Ficedula superciliaris
- Rusty-tailed flycatcher, Ficedula ruficauda
- Taiga flycatcher, Ficedula albicilla
- Red-breasted flycatcher, Ficedula parva
- Kashmir flycatcher, Fidedula subrubra
- Black-and-orange flycatcher, Ficedula nigrorufa
- Black redstart, Phoenicurus ochruros
- Common rock thrush, Monticola saxatilis
- Blue rock thrush, Monticola solitarius
- Blue-capped rock thrush, Monticola cinclorhyncha
- Siberian stonechat, Saxicola maurus
- Amur stonechat, Saxicola stejnegeri
- Pied bush chat, Saxicola caprata
- Northern wheatear, Oenanthe oenanthe (A)
- Isabelline wheatear, Oenanthe isabellina
- Desert wheatear, Oenanthe deserti
- Pied wheatear, Oenanthe pleschanka
- Brown rock chat, Oenanthe fusca

== Leafbirds ==
Order: Passeriformes Family: Chloropseidae

The leafbirds are small, bulbul-like birds. The males are brightly plumaged, usually in greens and yellows.

- Jerdon's leafbird, Chloropsis jerdoni
- Golden-fronted leafbird, Chloropsis aurifrons

== Flowerpeckers ==
Order: Passeriformes Family: Dicaeidae

The flowerpeckers are very small, stout, often brightly coloured birds, with short tails, short thick curved bills and tubular tongues.

- Thick-billed flowerpecker, Dicaeum agile
- Pale-billed flowerpecker, Dicaeum erythrorhynchos
- Nilgiri flowerpecker, Dicaeum concolor

== Sunbirds ==
Order: Passeriformes Family: Nectariniidae

The sunbirds and spiderhunters are very small passerine birds which feed largely on nectar, although they will also take insects, especially when feeding young. Flight is fast and direct on their short wings. Most species can take nectar by hovering like a hummingbird, but usually perch to feed.

- Purple-rumped sunbird, Leptocoma zeylonica
- Crimson-backed sunbird, Leptocoma minima
- Purple sunbird, Cinnyris asiaticus
- Loten's sunbird, Cinnyris lotenius
- Vigors's sunbird, Aethopyga vigorsii
- Little spiderhunter, Arachnothera longirostra

== Old World sparrows and snowfinches ==
Order: Passeriformes Family: Passeridae

Old World sparrows are small passerine birds. In general, sparrows tend to be small, plump, brown or grey birds with short tails and short powerful beaks. Sparrows are seed eaters, but they also consume small insects.

- House sparrow, Passer domesticus
- Pale rockfinch, Carpospiza brachydactyla (A)
- Yellow-throated sparrow, Gymnoris xanthocollis

== Weavers and widowbirds ==
Order: Passeriformes Family: Ploceidae

The weavers are small passerine birds related to the finches. They are seed-eating birds with rounded conical bills. The males of many species are brightly coloured, usually in red or yellow and black, some species show variation in colour only in the breeding season.

- Black-breasted weaver, Ploceus benghalensis
- Streaked weaver, Ploceus manyar
- Baya weaver, Ploceus philippinus

== Waxbills, munias, and allies ==
Order: Passeriformes Family: Estrildidae

The estrildid finches are small passerine birds of the Old World tropics and Australasia. They are gregarious and often colonial seed eaters with short thick but pointed bills. They are all similar in structure and habits, but have wide variation in plumage colours and patterns.

- Indian silverbill, Euodice malabarica
- Scaly-breasted munia, Lonchura punctulata
- Black-throated munia, Lonchura kelaarti
- White-rumped munia, Lonchura striata
- Tricoloured munia, Lonchura malacca
- Red avadavat, Amandava amandava

== Wagtails and pipits ==
Order: Passeriformes Family: Motacillidae

Motacillidae is a family of small passerine birds with medium to long tails. They include the wagtails, longclaws and pipits. They are slender, ground feeding insectivores of open country.

- Forest wagtail, Dendronanthus indicus
- Western yellow wagtail, Motacilla flava) and one of the black-headed races
- Citrine wagtail, Motacilla citreola
- Grey wagtail, Motacilla cinerea
- White wagtail, Motacilla alba
- White-browed wagtail, Motacilla maderaspatensis
- Richard's pipit, Anthus richardi
- Paddyfield pipit, Anthus rufulus
- Blyth's pipit, Anthus godlewskii
- Tawny pipit, Anthus campestris
- Long-billed pipit, Anthus similis
- Tree pipit, Anthus trivialis
- Olive-backed pipit, Anthus hodgsoni
- Red-throated pipit, Anthus cervinus
- Nilgiri pipit, Anthus nilghiriensis

== Finches and euphonias ==
Order: Passeriformes Family: Fringillidae

Finches are seed-eating passerine birds, that are small to moderately large and have a strong beak, usually conical and in some species very large. All have twelve tail feathers and nine primaries. These birds have a bouncing flight with alternating bouts of flapping and gliding on closed wings, and most sing well.

- Common rosefinch, Carpodacus erythrinus

== Buntings ==
Order: Passeriformes Family: Emberizidae

The emberizids are a large family of passerine birds. They are seed-eating birds with distinctively shaped bills. In Europe, most species are called buntings. In North America, most of the species in this family are known as sparrows, but these birds are not closely related to the Old World sparrows which are in the family Passeridae. Many emberizid species have distinctive head patterns.

- Crested bunting, Emberiza lathami
- Grey-necked bunting, Emberiza buchanani
- Ortolan bunting, Emberiza hortulana
- Striolated bunting, Emberiza striolata
- Little bunting, Emberiza pusilla (A)
- Black-headed bunting, Emberiza melanocephala
- Red-headed bunting, Emberiza bruniceps

== See also ==
- Lists of birds by region
