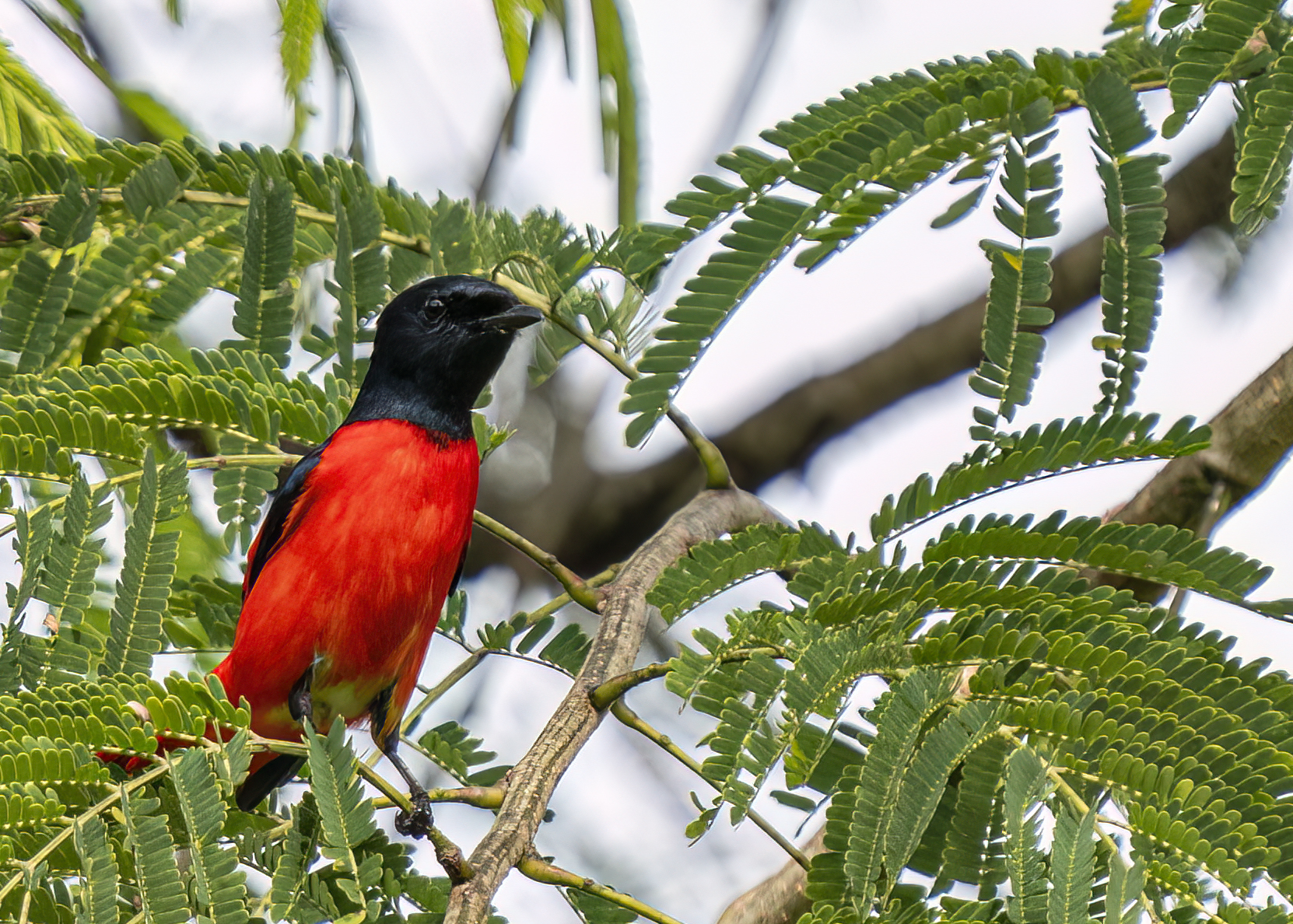

Conservation status
- Least Concern (IUCN 3.1)

Scientific classification
- Kingdom: Animalia
- Phylum: Chordata
- Class: Aves
- Order: Passeriformes
- Family: Campephagidae
- Genus: Pericrocotus
- Species: P. speciosus

Binomial name
- Pericrocotus speciosus (Latham, 1790)

= Scarlet minivet =

Species of bird

The scarlet minivet (Pericrocotus speciosus) is a small passerine bird in the cuckooshrike family Campephagidae. This minivet is found in tropical southern Asia from Northeast India to southern China, Indonesia, and the Philippines. They are common resident breeding birds in forests and other well-wooded habitats including gardens, especially in hilly country. While the male of most subspecies are scarlet to orange with black upper parts, the females are usually yellow with greyish olive upper parts. Several former subspecies have been elevated to a species status in recent works. These include the orange minivet. All subspecies have the same habits of gleaning for insects and are often seen in mixed-species foraging flocks, usually foraging in small groups, high up in the forest canopy.

== Description ==
The scarlet minivet is 20–22 cm (7.9–8.7 in) long with a strong dark beak and long wings. The male has black upperparts and head, and scarlet underparts, tail edges, rump and wing patches. The shape and colour of the wing patches and the shade or orange in the male varies across populations. In the subspecies nigroluteus and marchesae from south Philippines the scarlet/orange is entirely replaced by yellow. The female is grey above, with yellow underparts (including the face), tail edges, rump and wing patches.

== Taxonomy and systematics ==
There is considerable geographic variation in this species and several disjunct populations exist. Some former races are sometimes considered full species requiring the reorganization of other former subspecies. An example of a split from P. speciosus is the orange minivet (Pericrocotus flammeus). As many as nineteen subspecies have been described:

- speciosus (Latham, 1790) along the Himalayas
  - fraterculus Swinhoe, 1870 is found in the northeast of India and extends into Myanmar, Yunnan and Hainan
  - semiruber Whistler & Kinnear, 1933 is found in southern Myanmar and Thailand
  - andamanensis Beavan, 1867 - Andaman Islands
- fohkiensis Buturlin, 1910 is found in southeastern China
- flammifer Hume, 1875 is found in southern Myanmar, southern Thailand and Peninsular Malaysia
- xanthogaster (Raffles, 1822) is found in the southern part of Peninsular Malaysia and Sumatra

Several isolated island forms that have been described include:

- minythomelas Oberholser, 1912 is an insular form described from Simeulue Island off Sumatra.
- modiglianii Salvadori, 1892 from Enggano Island
- insulanus Deignan, 1946 from Borneo.
- siebersi Rensch, 1928 from Java and Bali.
- exul Wallace, 1864 from Lombok
- novus McGregor, 1904 from Luzon and Negros
- leytensis Steere, 1890 from Samar, Leyte and Bohol
- gonzalesi Ripley & Rabor, 1961 from N & E Mindanao
- nigroluteus Parkes, 1981 from south central Mindanao
- johnstoniae Ogilvie-Grant, 1905 from Mt. Apo in southeastern Mindanao
- marchesae Guillemard, 1885 from the Sulu Archipelago

== Ecology and behaviour ==
This minivet catches insects in trees by flycatching or while perched. It flushes insects out of foliage by beating its wings hard. Scarlet minivet will form small flocks. Its song is a pleasant whistling. This bird nests high up in the treetops. The nest is a cup-like structure woven with small twigs and spiders' webs to increase the strength of the nest. Two or three spotted pale green eggs are laid. Incubation is mainly by the female, but both birds help to raise the offspring.
