= Chamundeshwari Temple =

Temple in the state of Karnataka in India

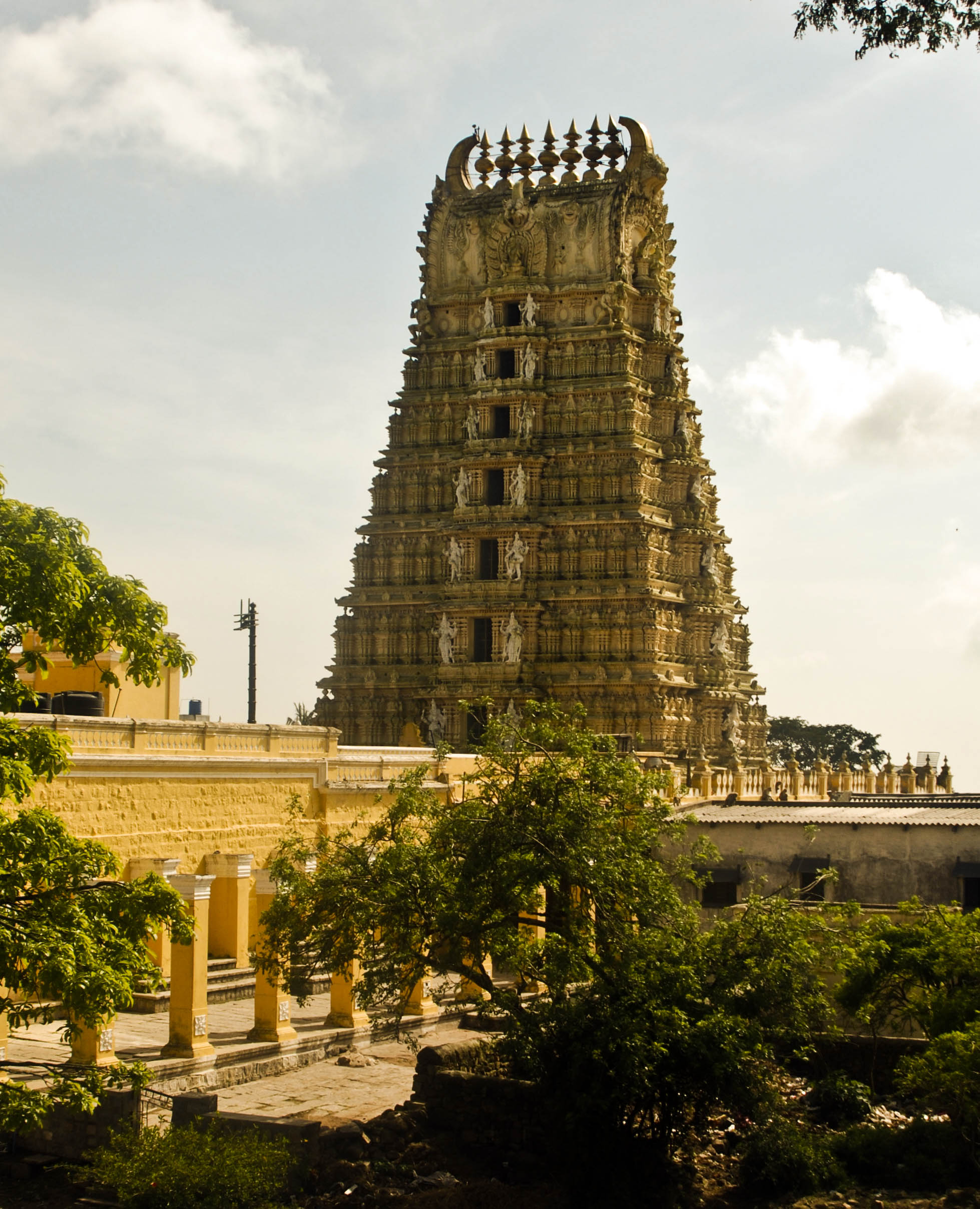
- The gopura

- Location in Karnataka

Religion
- Affiliation: Hinduism
- District: Mysore
- Deity: Chamundeshwari
- Festival: Navaratri

Location
- Location: Chamundi Hill
- State: Karnataka
- Country: Republic of India
- Coordinates: 12.272474°N 76.670611°E

Website
- Chamundeshwari Temple

The Chamundeshwari Temple is a Hindu temple located on the top of Chamundi Hills about 13 km from the palace city of Mysuru in the state of Karnataka in India. The temple was named after Chamundeshwari or, the fierce form of Shakti, a tutelary deity held in reverence for centuries by the Maharaja of Mysuru.

Chamundeshwari is called by the people of Karnataka as Nada Devi (ನಾಡ ದೇವಿ), which means state Goddess. It is situated at the elevation of around 3300 ft from the mean sea level. It is believed that Goddess Durga slew the demon king Mahishasura on the top of this hill which was ruled by him. The place was later known as Mahishooru (Place of Mahisha) and Mysuru in a general Kannada phonetic pronunciation. Later, the British anglicized it to Mysore.

== Religious importance ==
The Chamundeshwari Temple is considered as a Shakta pitha and one among the 18 Shakta pithas. It is known as Krouncha Pitha as the region was known in Puranic times as Krouncha Puri. It is said that the hair of Sati fell here.

== Architecture ==
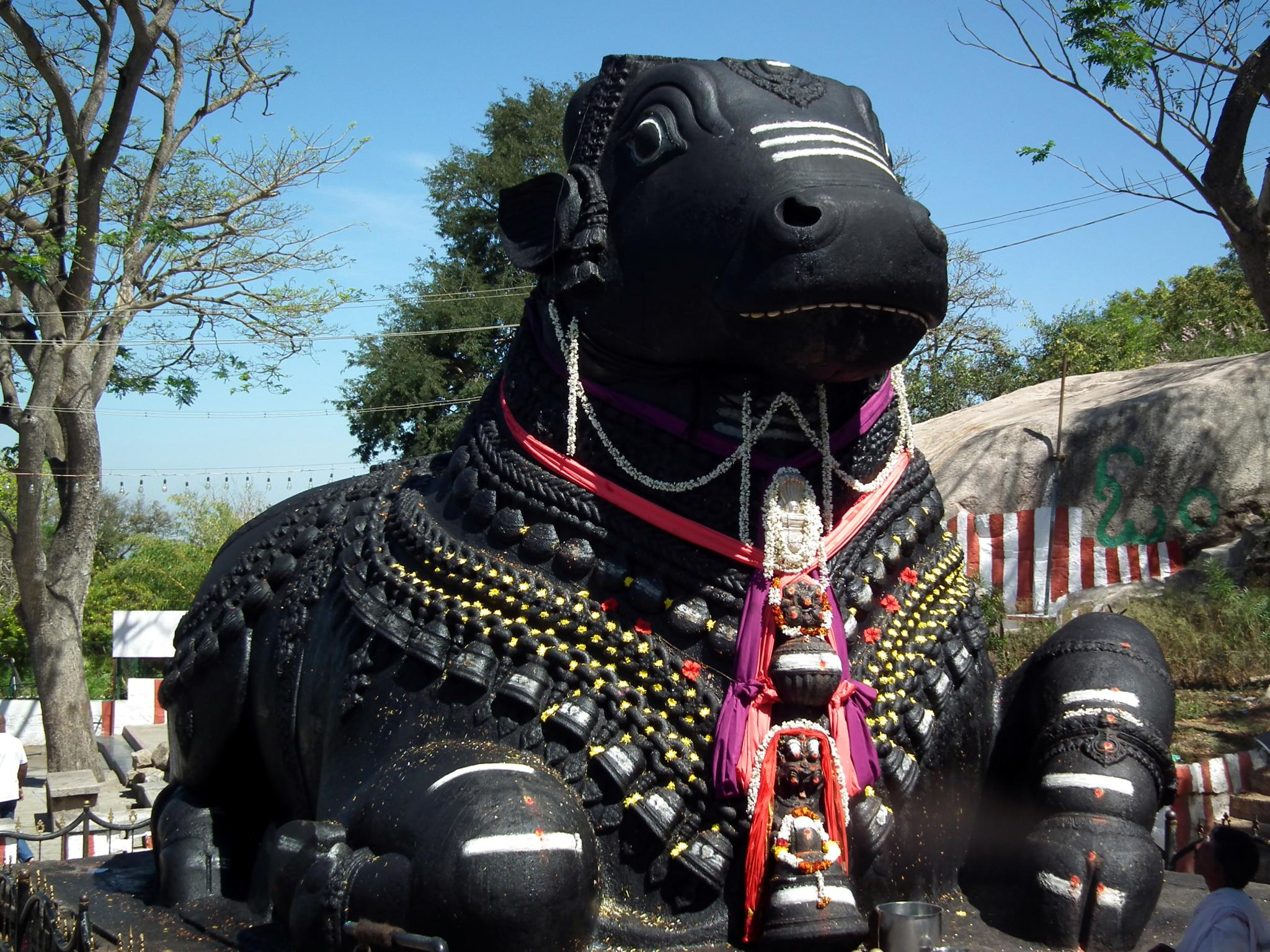
Monolithic image of Nandi in the temple premises

The original shrine is thought to have been built in the 12th century by the rulers of the Hoysala Dynasty while its tower was probably built by the Rulers of the Vijayanagara Empire in the 17th century. In 1659, a staircase of one thousand steps was built leading up to the 3000-foot summit of the hill. The sanctum houses the image of Chamundeswari sported with 'Ashtabhuja' or eight hands. At the temple are several images of Nandi (the bull mount of Shiva). There is a huge granite Nandi on the 700th step on the hill in front of a small Shiva temple a short distance away. The image was installed by Mysore Maharaja Dooda Devaraja Wodeyar during 1664. The Chamundi hills also houses Sri Mahabaleswara temple and also Sri Narayanaswamy temple.

== Festivals ==
The temple is famous for the celebrations of festivals like Ashada Shukravara (ಆಶಾಡಾ ಶುಕ್ರವಾರ), Navaratri and Ammanavara Vardhanthi (ಅಮ್ಮನವರ ವರ್ಧಂತಿ). In the month of Ashadha, Fridays are considered particularly auspicious. Lakhs of devotees throng the temple during this occasion. Another festival celebrated during this month is Chamundi Jayanti. This day is celebrated on the anniversary of the consecration of the Utsava Moorti of the goddess by the Maharaja of Mysore. On this occasion, the goddess's idol is taken around the temple in a golden palanquin.

The most important festival that is celebrated here is the Dasara . Mysuru Dasara is celebrated as the state festival of Karnataka, called Nada habba (ನಾಡಾ ಹಬ್ಬಾ) in Kannada. During Navaratri, the idol is decorated in 9 different ways to depict the nine different aspects of the goddess known as Navadurgas. On the 7th day of Navaratri that is dedicated to the goddess Kalaratri, valuable jewels donated by Maharajas are brought from the District Treasury of Mysuru and are given to the temple to decorate the idol.

Another temple is situated at the foothill which is in Utthanahalli called as Jwalamalini Sri Tripura Sundari Temple. This goddess is considered the sister of Chamundeshwari who helped her at the battlefield to slay the demon Raktabīja.
