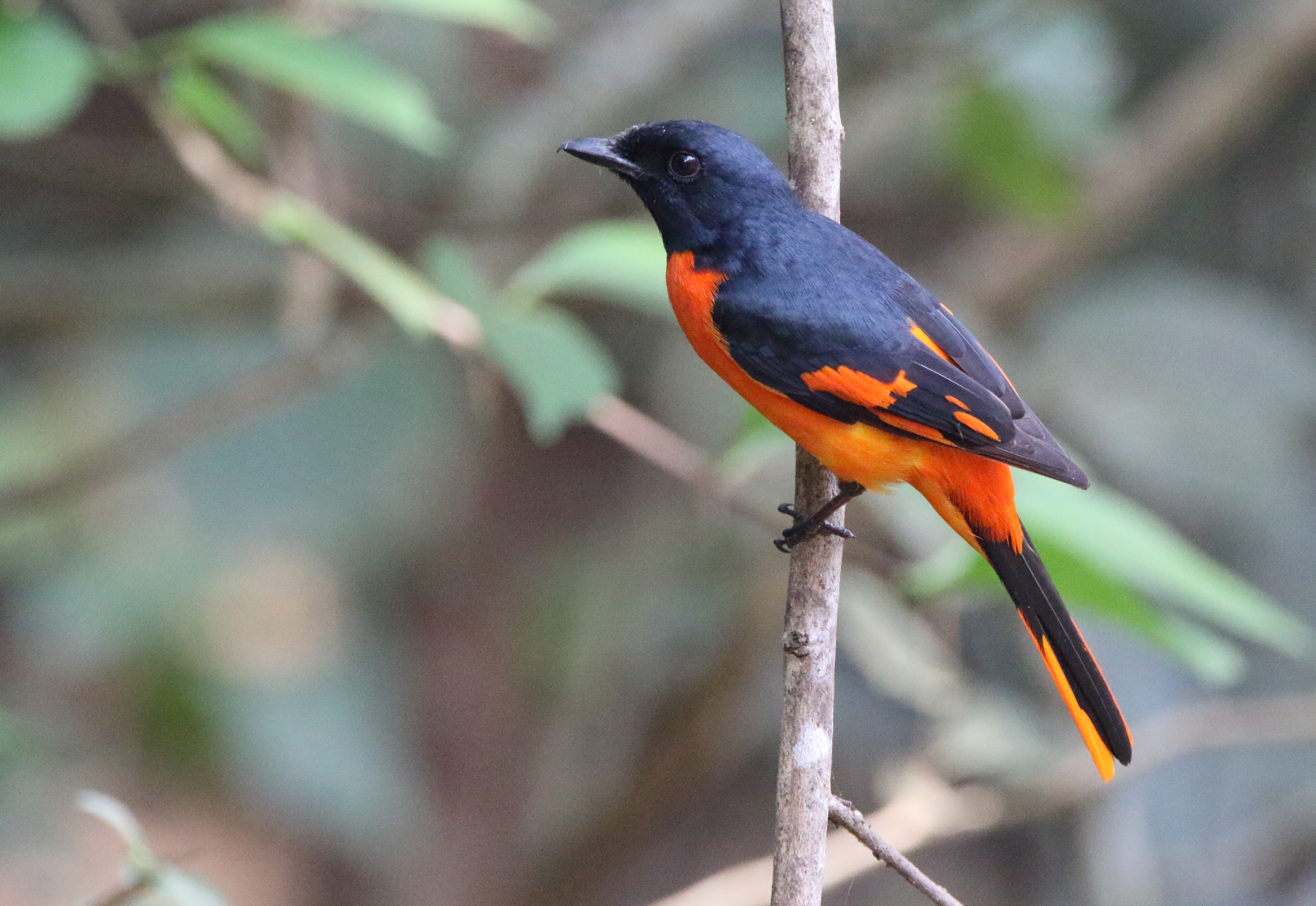
- Male in South India
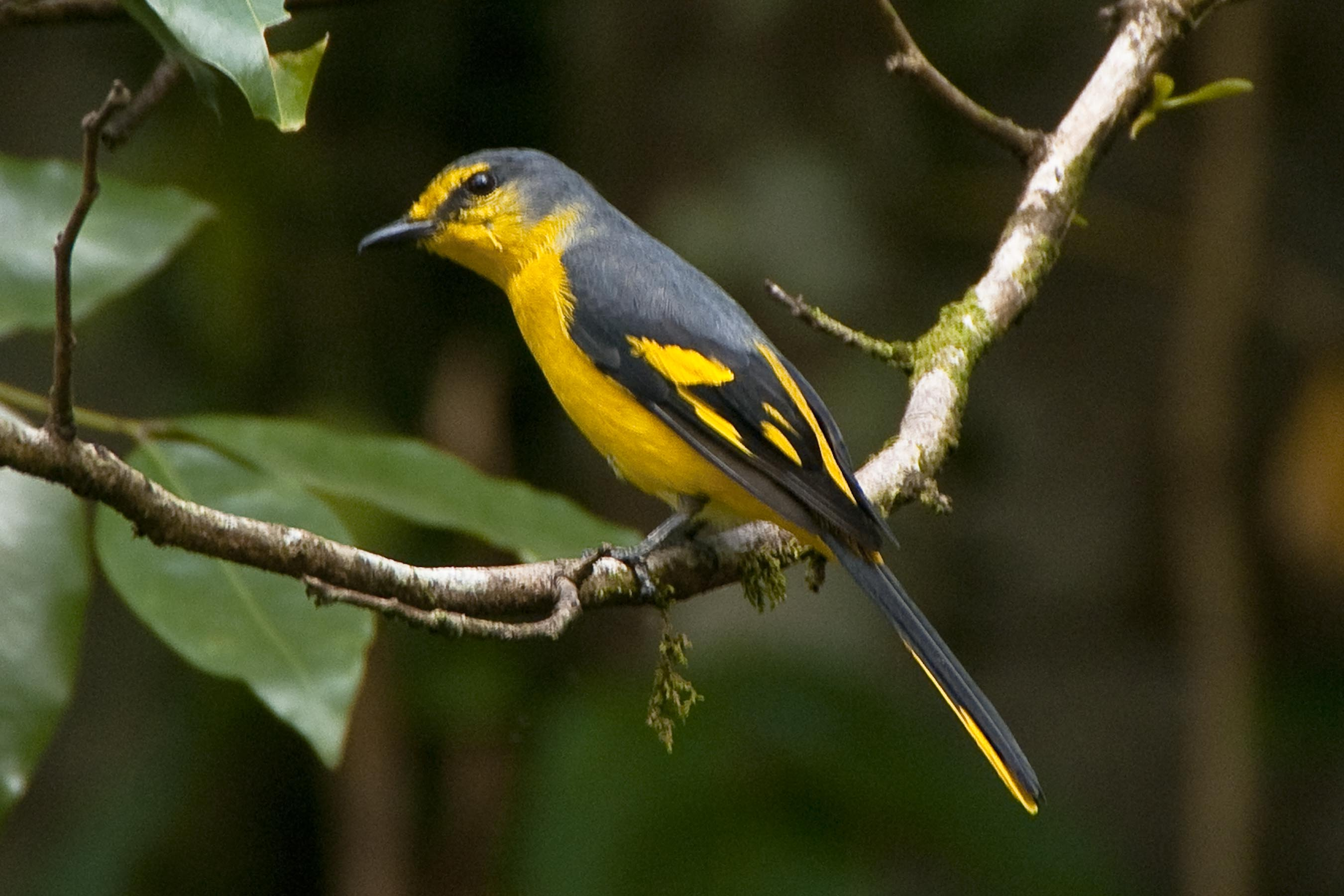
- Female in Sri Lanka

Conservation status
- Least Concern (IUCN 3.1)

Scientific classification
- Kingdom: Animalia
- Phylum: Chordata
- Class: Aves
- Order: Passeriformes
- Family: Campephagidae
- Genus: Pericrocotus
- Species: P. flammeus

Binomial name
- Pericrocotus flammeus (Forster, 1781)

= Orange minivet =

Species of bird

The orange minivet (Pericrocotus flammeus) is a brightly colored bird in the cuckooshrike family, Campephagidae. It is found all along the Western Ghats and west coast of India and Sri Lanka. It was formerly considered a subspecies of the scarlet minivet which is considered to have a wider distribution in eastern and northern India and South-east Asia. Its natural habitats are temperate forests, subtropical or tropical moist lowland forest, and subtropical or tropical moist montane forest. The orange minivet is a species resident in southern India and Sri Lanka, that feeds primarily on insects while foraging in mixed-species bird flocks or in small single-species groups.

== Taxonomy and systematics ==
The genus name comes from Ancient Greek peri - 'very'; krokotus 'saffron-coloured'. The species name flammeus has its roots in Latin, meaning 'fiery' or 'flame-coloured' (flamma - 'flame'). The English name of this species was changed from scarlet minivet to orange minivet after the former was assigned to Pericrocotus speciosus following the split of these two species. This is a complex of species from South and South-east Asia which needs more detailed work.

== Description ==
The orange minivet measures about 17 – 22 cm and weighs 19 – 24.5 g. Males are bright orange and black while females are largely yellow with a grey upperside. Males have a glossy black head, chin, throat and mantle and upper back. Lower back, rump and uppertail-coverts are orange-red. Underparts are largely bright orange-red, that makes it stand out in the surroundings. It can be distinguished from other Pericrocotus species by isolated red markings near tips of tertials and inner secondaries. Females have a yellow forehead and ashy-grey, lower back. Red areas of male are replaced by yellow and in addition they have a yellow chin and are almost completely bright yellow on the underside. Juveniles resemble the female in this species with some variation.

== Behaviour and ecology ==
The call of an orange minivet

The species is gregarious, typically seen foraging in small groups (more than 2 individuals) along tree tops in forests. Minivets are often seen to make bouncing flights over the canopy of the forest. They are primarily insectivorous, known to perch and scan surroundings. They catch prey by making a flight and hovering at plant surfaces to pick insects. This behaviour is often known as sally-gleaning. They regularly forage in mixed-hunting parties along with other canopy species of birds. The call of this species is sweeping whistles composed of multiple "weep-sweep" notes. They are often seen to call when in flight or when stationary.
