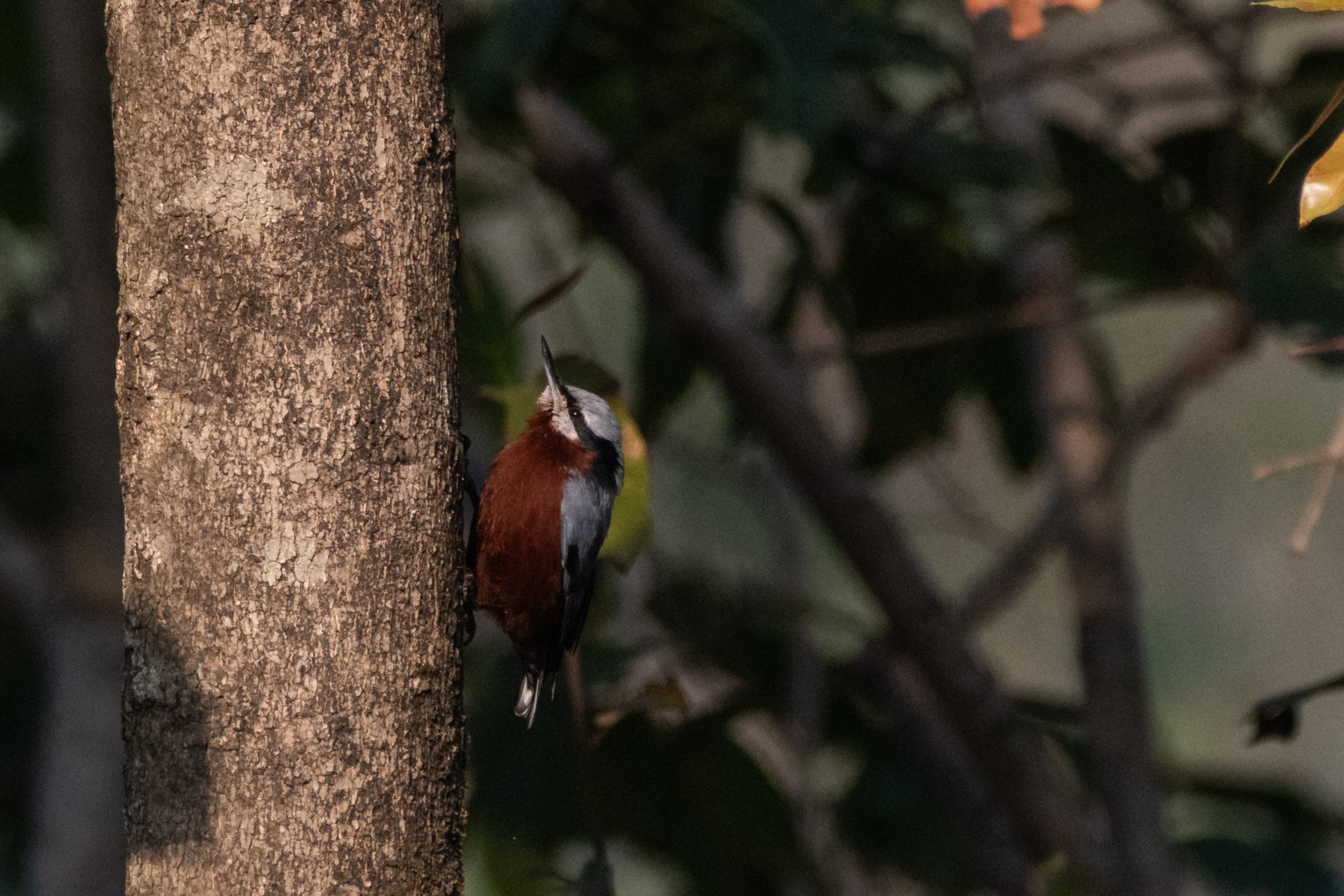

Conservation status
- Least Concern (IUCN 3.1)

Scientific classification
- Kingdom: Animalia
- Phylum: Chordata
- Class: Aves
- Order: Passeriformes
- Family: Sittidae
- Genus: Sitta
- Species: S. castanea

Binomial name
- Sitta castanea Lesson, 1830

= Indian nuthatch =

Species of bird

The Indian nuthatch (Sitta castanea) is a species of bird in the family Sittidae. It is found in Bangladesh, India and Nepal.

Its natural habitats are subtropical or tropical dry forests, subtropical or tropical moist lowland forests, and subtropical or tropical moist montane forests.

This species has been split by Rasmussen and Anderton (2005) from the chestnut-bellied nuthatch. The Indian nuthatch (including the older prateri of the Eastern Ghats) is found south of the Ganges river. It is the only grey-backed, rufous-bellied nuthatch in the peninsula. Similar to the chestnut-bellied nuthatch but has a smaller bill and a frosty crown that is paler than the mantle. The wing and tail patterns lack contrast and has grey centres to the chestnut undertail coverts. Resident in the Terai and Gangetic plain extending into central India, the Eastern Ghats, Sunderbans and a disjunct population in the Western Ghats. Breeds from February to July. Different in vocalization from the chestnut-bellied nuthatch.

== Gallery ==
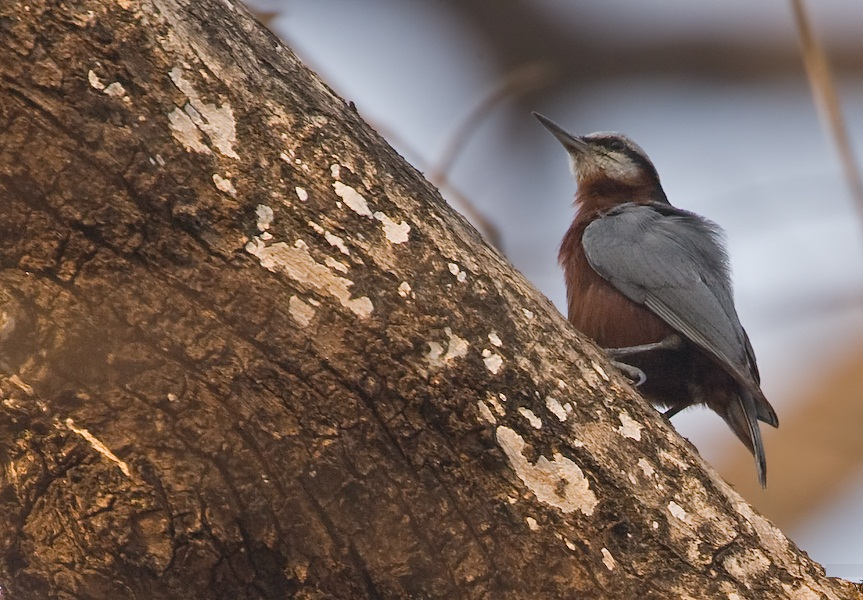
In Dandeli, Karnataka, India

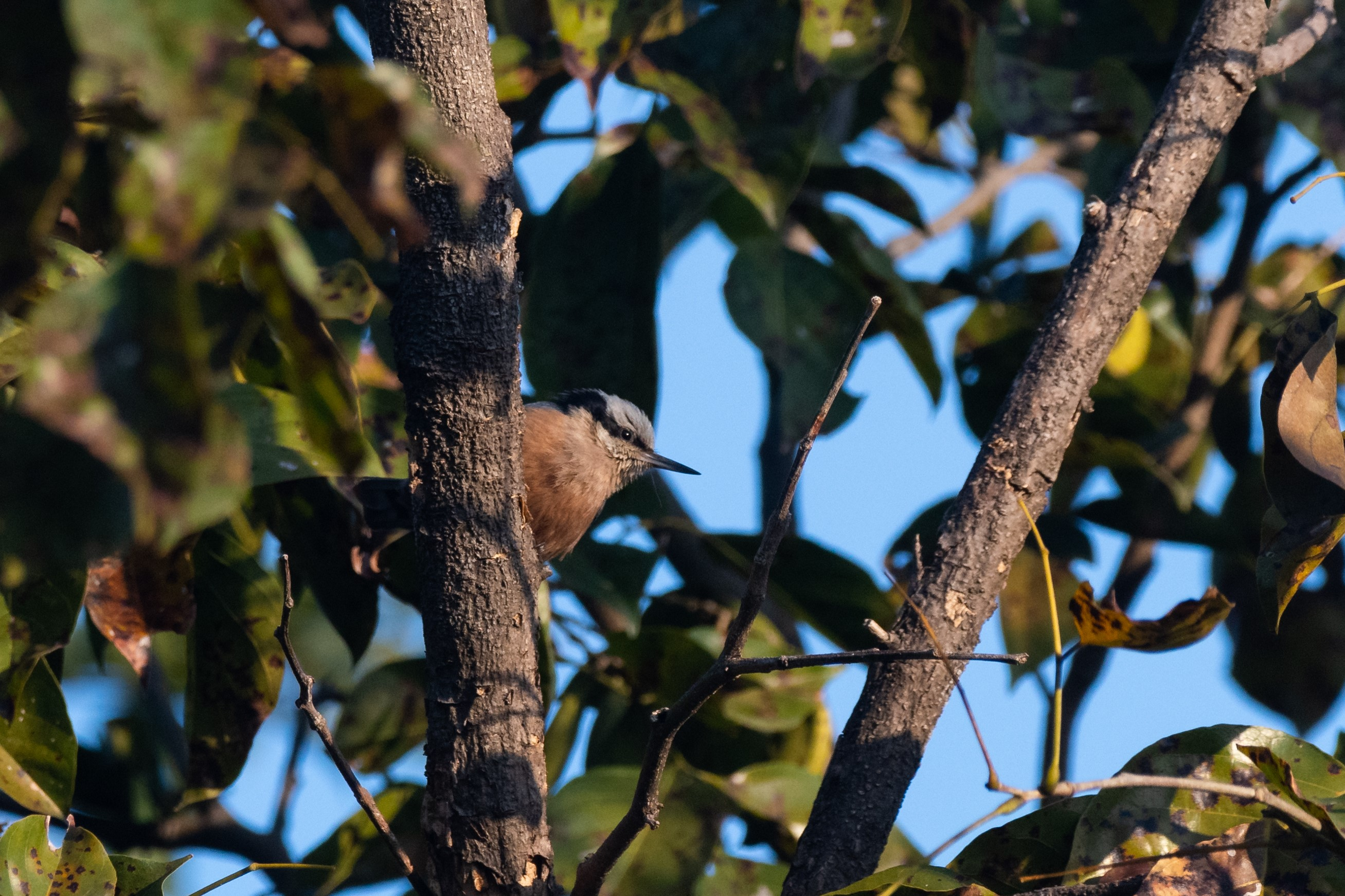
Female from Satpura Tiger Reserve, Madhya Pradesh, India
