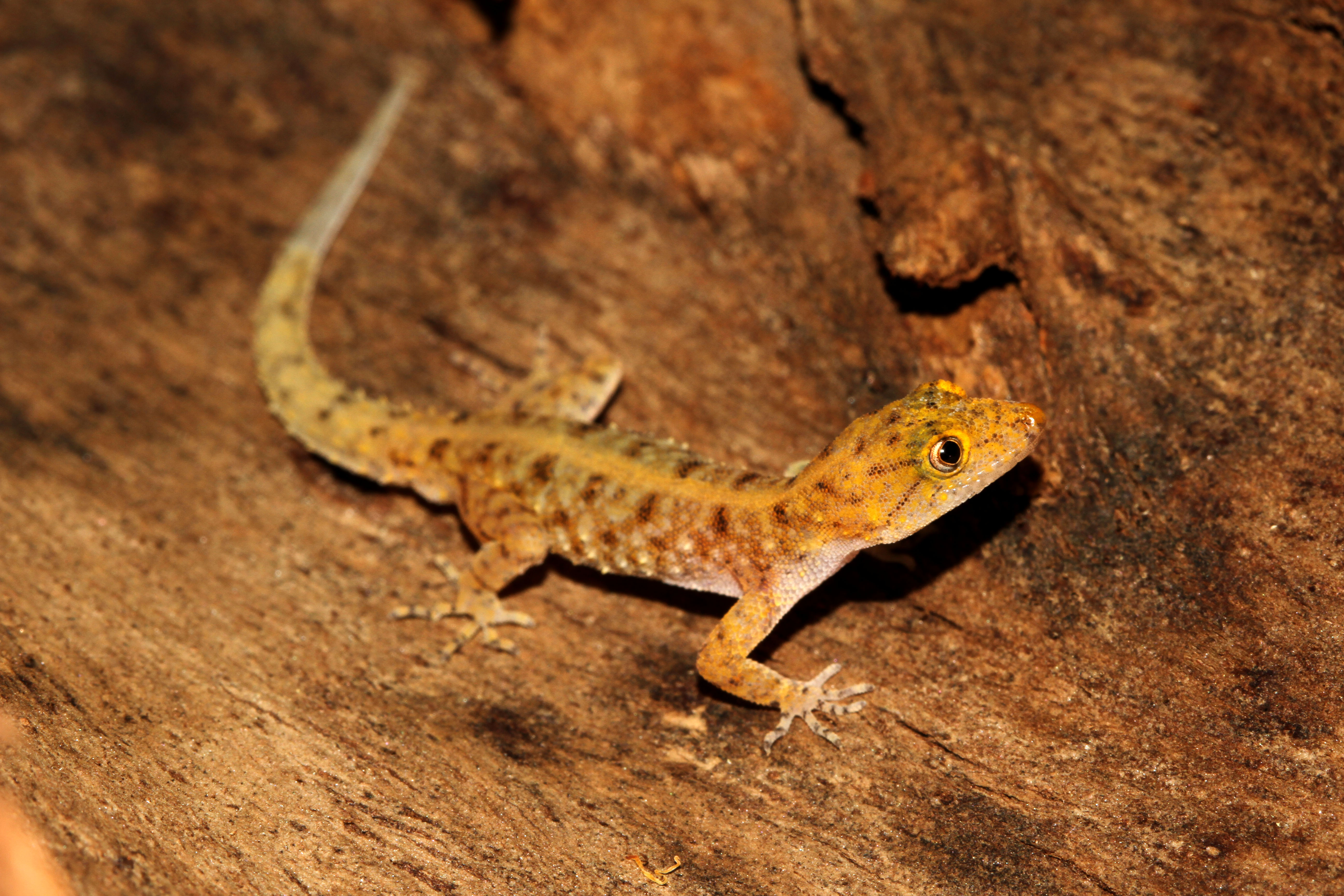

Conservation status
- Least Concern (IUCN 3.1)

Scientific classification
- Kingdom: Animalia
- Phylum: Chordata
- Class: Reptilia
- Order: Squamata
- Suborder: Gekkota
- Family: Gekkonidae
- Genus: Cnemaspis
- Species: C. mysoriensis

Binomial name
- Cnemaspis mysoriensis (Jerdon, 1853)

Synonyms
- Gymnodactylus mysorensis; Gonatodes mysoriensis

= Mysore day gecko =

Species of lizard

The Mysore day gecko (Cnemaspis mysoriensis) is a species of diurnal gecko endemic to the Bangalore uplands in Karnataka state, South India. It is rock-dwelling and is found in deciduous forest tracts in mid-hills. This species occurs in Hosur / Krishnagiri hills of Tamil Nadu and Bangarapet Ramnagara and Tumkur districts in Karnataka state.
