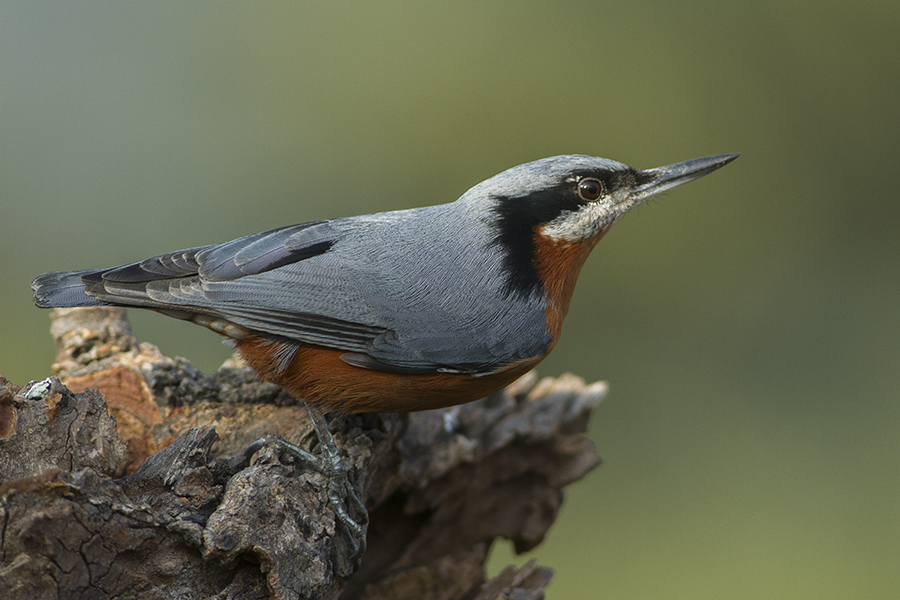
- Male in Uttarakhand, India

Conservation status
- Least Concern (IUCN 3.1)

Scientific classification
- Kingdom: Animalia
- Phylum: Chordata
- Class: Aves
- Order: Passeriformes
- Family: Sittidae
- Genus: Sitta
- Species: S. cinnamoventris

Binomial name
- Sitta cinnamoventris Blyth, 1842

= Chestnut-bellied nuthatch =

Species of bird

The chestnut-bellied nuthatch (Sitta cinnamoventris) is a species of bird belonging to the family Sittidae.

It is found in the Indian subcontinent occurring in the countries of India, Tibet, Bangladesh, Bhutan, and Nepal.

It is found in subtropical or tropical forest, that are dry or moist forests, and in montane and lowland forests.

This species is very similar to the Burmese nuthatch but it has a heavier bill, the crown and mantle are of the same shade. The wing and tail markings show contrasting markings; silvery-edge to primaries, blackish inner webs to tertials and tail with large white spots in the tail. Rasmussen and Anderton (2005) established the chestnut-bellied nuthatch is different from the Indian nuthatch and the Burmese nuthatch. White on ear coverts does not extend into chin unlike in the Indian nuthatch. Race almorae of Nepal and NW Himalayas has paler underparts; race koelzi of the eastern Himalayas has the female darker than in other races. Resident from Murree Hills to the Uttaranchal foothills extending to the Assam Valley, Arunachal Pradesh into the Lushai Hills.
