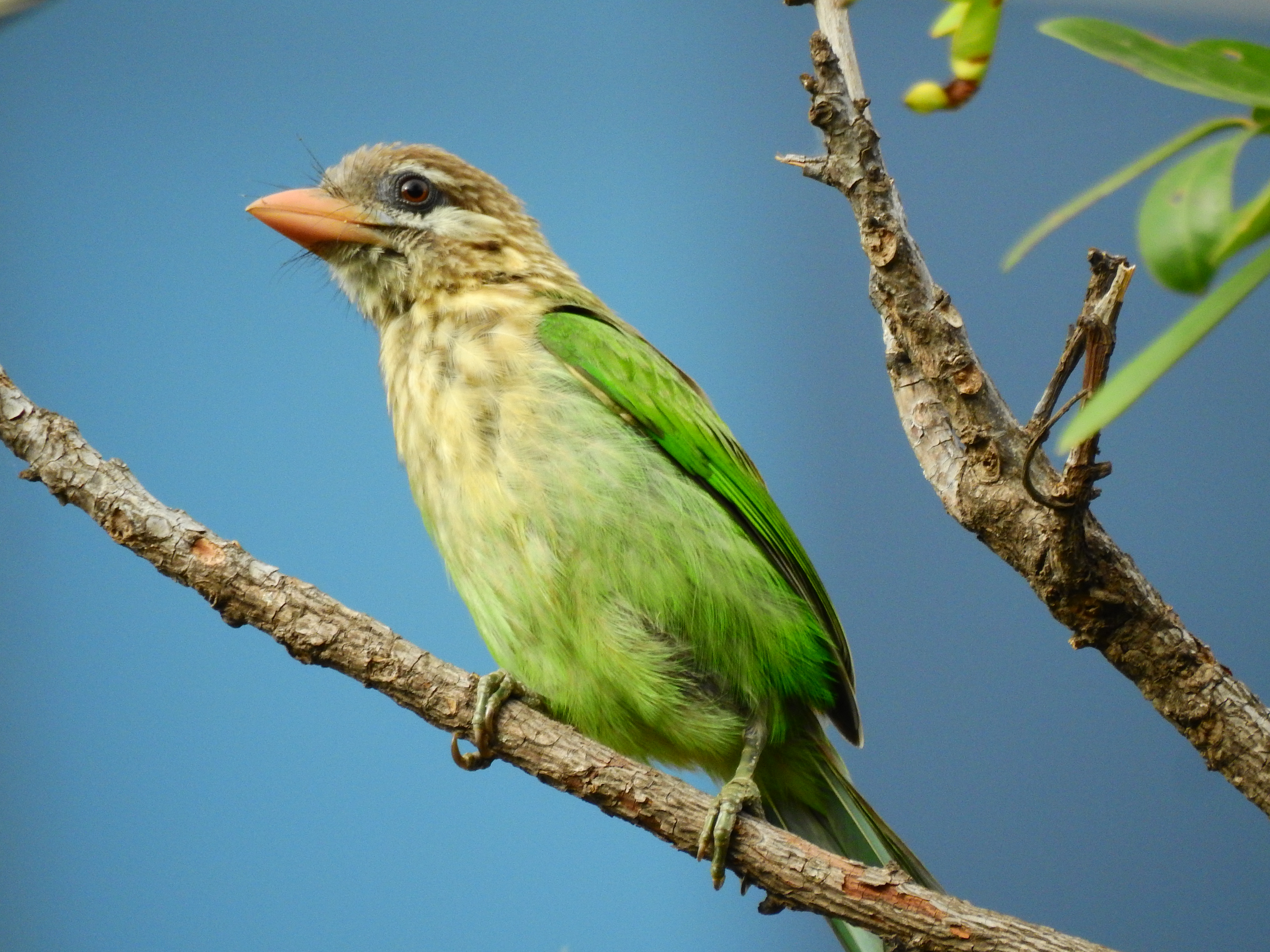

Conservation status
- Least Concern (IUCN 3.1)

Scientific classification
- Kingdom: Animalia
- Phylum: Chordata
- Class: Aves
- Order: Piciformes
- Family: Megalaimidae
- Genus: Psilopogon
- Species: P. viridis

Binomial name
- Psilopogon viridis (Boddaert, 1783)

Synonyms
- Bucco viridis, Thereiceryx viridis, Megalaima viridis

Audio
- Calls

= White-cheeked barbet =

Species of bird found in southern India

The white-cheeked barbet or small green barbet (Psilopogon viridis) is a species of Asian barbet found in southern India. It is very similar to the more widespread brown-headed barbet (or large green barbet, Psilopogon zeylanicus), but this species has a distinctive supercilium and a broad white cheek stripe below the eye and is found in the forest areas of the Western Ghats, parts of the Eastern Ghats and adjoining hills. The brown-headed barbet has an orange eye-ring but the calls are very similar and the two species occur together in some of the drier forests to the east of the Western Ghats. Like all other Asian barbets, they are mainly frugivorous (although they may sometimes eat insects), and use their bills to excavate nest cavities in trees.

== Taxonomy ==
Bucco viridis was the scientific name proposed by Pieter Boddaert in 1783 for a green barbet that had been described by Georges-Louis Leclerc, Comte de Buffon in 1780 based on a specimen collected in India. It was illustrated by François-Nicolas Martinet in a hand-coloured plate. It was placed in the genus Megalaima proposed by George Robert Gray in 1842 who suggested to use this name instead of Bucco. Its type locality is Mahé, Puducherry in southwestern India. It is a monotypic species.

In 2004, molecular phylogenetic research of barbets revealed that the Megalaima species form a clade, which also includes the fire-tufted barbet, the only species placed in the genus Psilopogon at the time. Asian barbets were therefore reclassified under the genus Psilopogon.

Results of a phylogenetic study of Asian barbets published in 2013 indicate that the white-cheeked barbet is most closely related to the yellow-fronted barbet (P. flavifrons), which is endemic to Sri Lanka.

The relationship of the white-cheeked barbet with some close relatives in its taxon is illustrated below.

- - Green-eared barbet Psilopogon faiostrictus
  - - - Lineated barbet Psilopogon lineatus
      - - Brown-headed barbet Psilopogon zeylanicus
        - - White-cheeked barbet Psilopogon viridis
          - Yellow-fronted barbet Psilopogon flavifrons

== Description ==
The white-cheeked barbet is 16.5–18.5 cm (6.5–7.3 in) in length. It has a brownish head streaked with white, sometimes giving it a capped appearance. The bill is pale pink. Size varies from the larger northern birds to the southern ones.

Like many other Asian barbets, white-cheeked barbets are green, sit still, and perch upright, making them difficult to spot. During the breeding season which begins at the start of summer their calls become loud and constant especially in the mornings. The call, a monotonous Kot-roo...Kotroo... starting with an explosive trrr is not easily differentiated from that of the brown-headed barbet. During hot afternoons, they may also utter a single note wut not unlike the call of collared scops owl or coppersmith barbet. Other harsh calls are produced during aggressive encounters.

== Distribution and habitat ==
The main range is along the Western Ghats south from the Surat Dangs and along the associated hills of southern India into parts of the southern Eastern Ghats mainly in the Shevaroy and Chitteri Hills. In some areas, it has been suggested that this species may have displaced the brown-headed barbet which was formerly the dominant barbet species.

== Behaviour and ecology ==
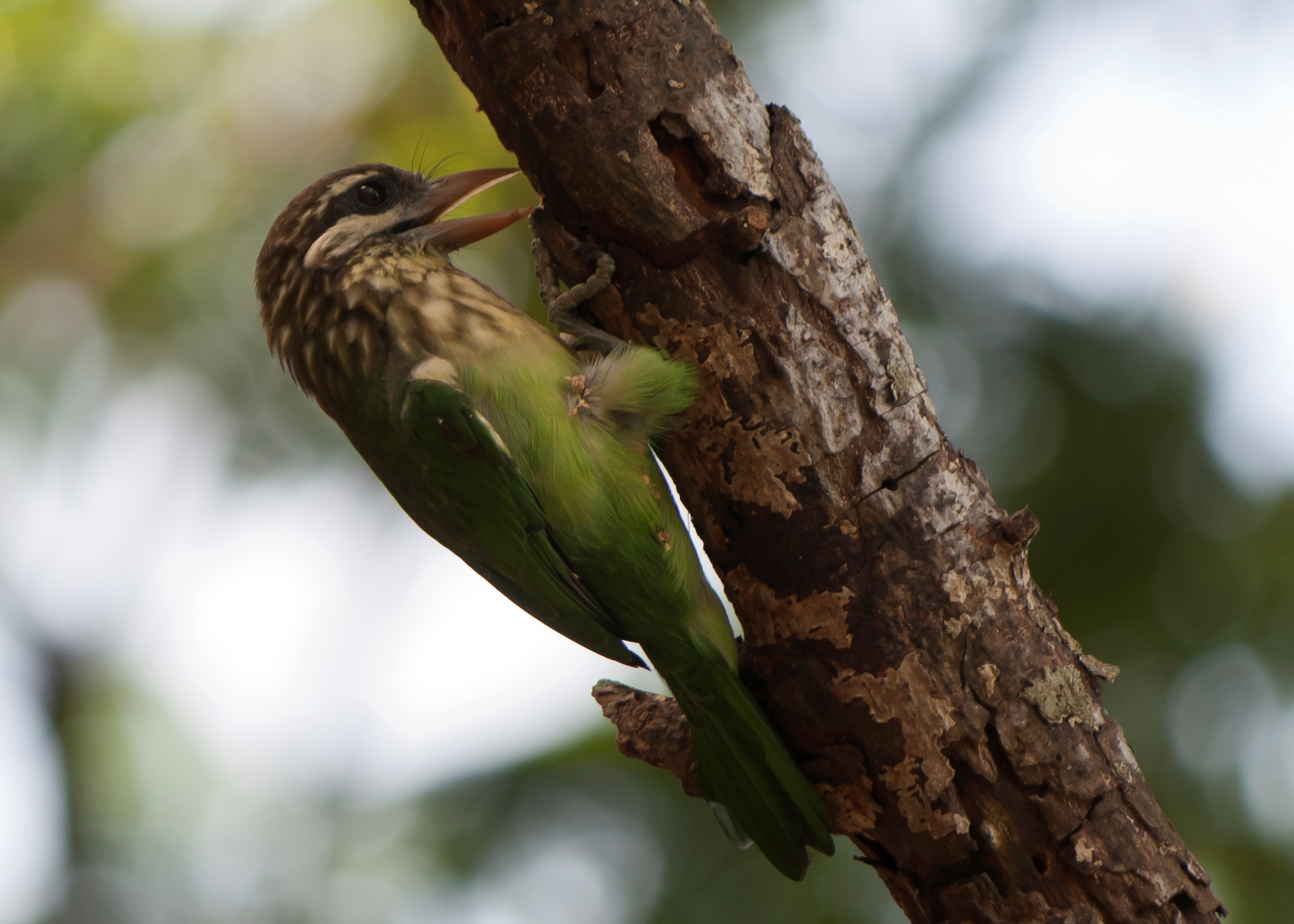
Barbet perching on the trunk to hollow its nest

The Indian ornithologist Salim Ali noted that some individuals call in the night during the breeding season, but this has been questioned by other observers who noted that they appear to be strictly diurnal.

=== Food and feeding ===
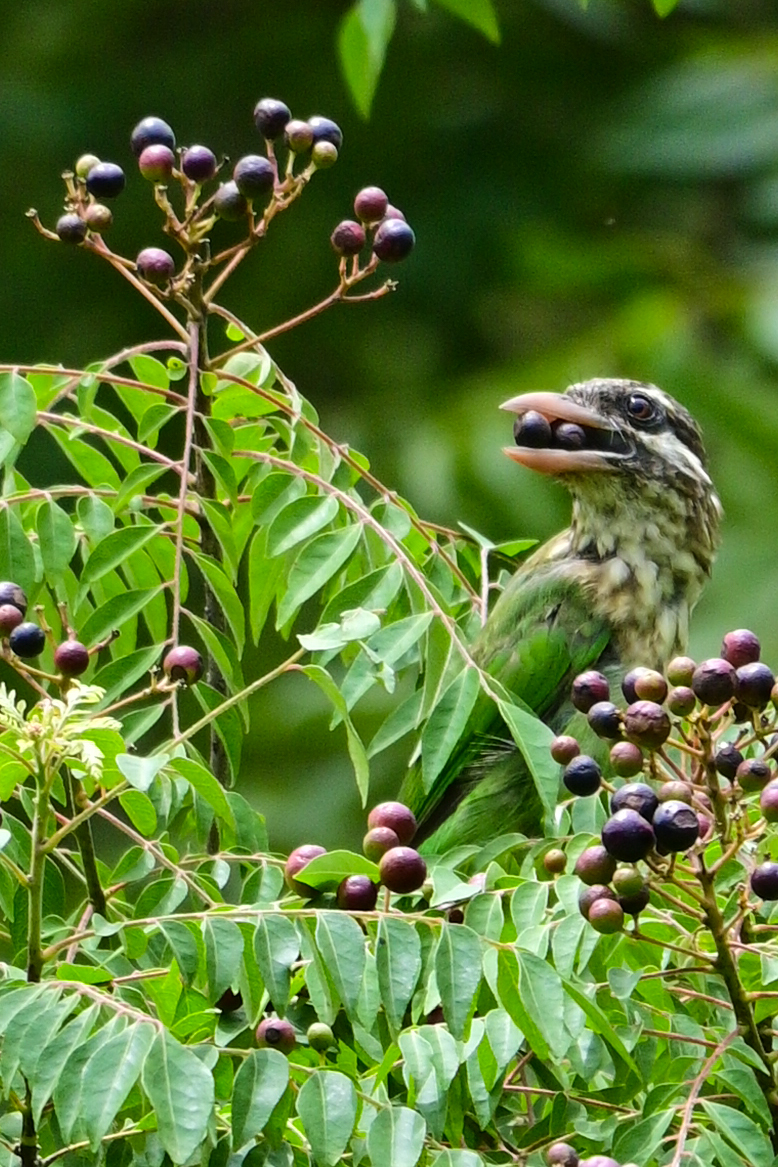
A white-cheeked barbet eating moringa seeds

The white-cheeked barbet feeds in trees and rarely visits the ground. It obtains most of the water needed from its fruit diet. When water is available in a tree hole, it sometimes drinks and bathes. It is mostly frugivorous, feeding on the fruits of various Ficus species including Ficus benjamina and Ficus mysorensis, but takes winged termites and other insects opportunistically. It also fruits of introduced tree species such as Muntingia calabura. When foraging it is aggressive and attempts to chase other barbets, Asian koels and other frugivores.

The white-cheeked barbet plays an important role in forests as seed dispersal agents. It also visits the flowers of Bombax for nectar and may be involved in pollination. Its fruit eating makes it a minor nuisance in fruit orchards although it is noted as having a beneficial effect in coffee plantations.

A species of tick in the genus Haemaphysalis is known to be specific in its parasitic association with the white-cheeked barbet, and some species of Leucocytozoon are known to be blood parasites. Some species of Haemaphysalis are known to carry the virus responsible for the Kyasanur forest disease. Shikras have been recorded preying on adults.

=== Breeding ===
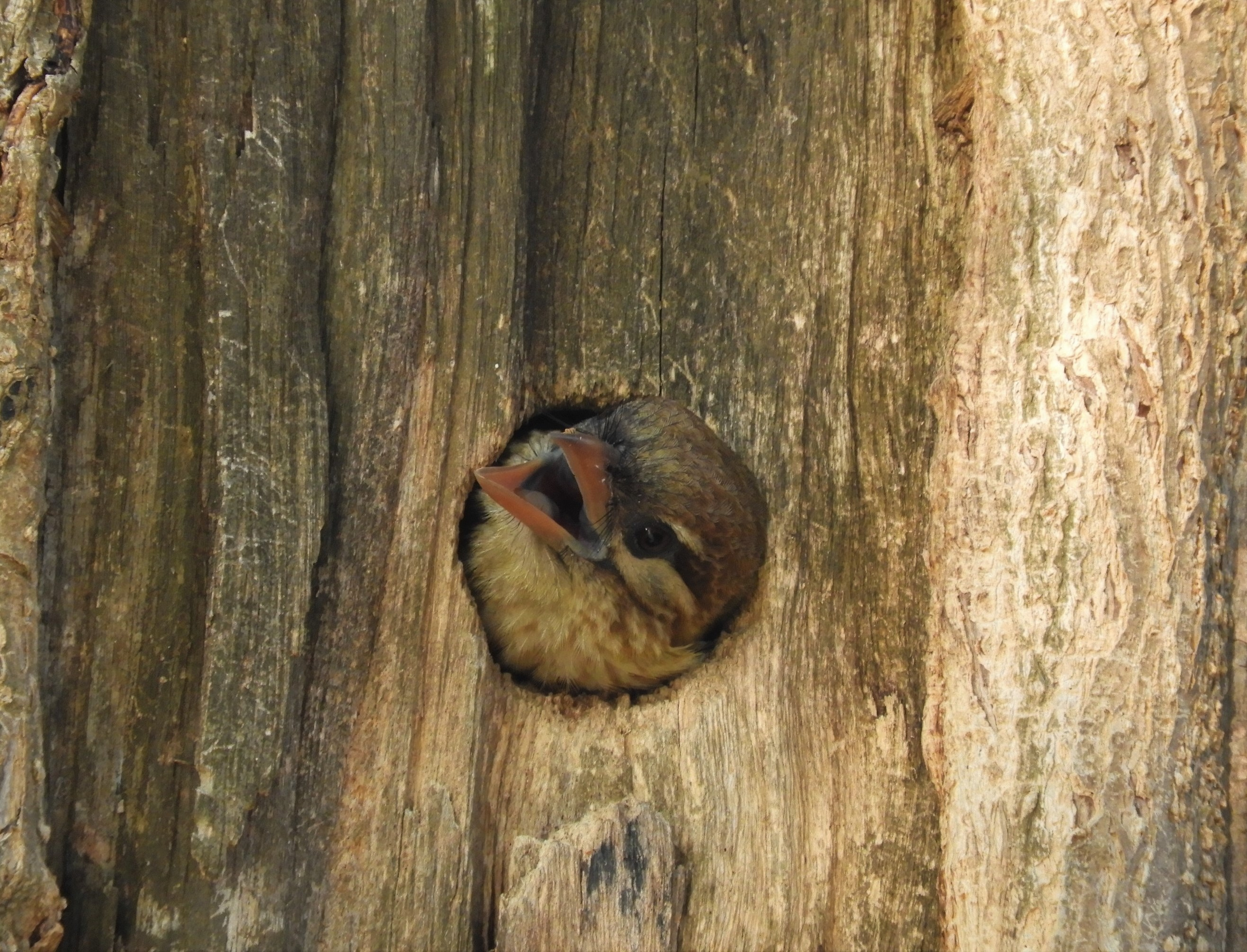
An adult peeking from nest entrance

In Periyar Tiger Reserve, the white-cheeked barbet begins breeding in December and continue to nest until May. It is thought to form a pair bond that lasts for longer than a single breeding season. Calling is intense during the courtship period. Courtship feeding of the female by the male is usual prior to copulation. Calling intensity drops after the hatching of the eggs. The nest hole is usually made in dead branches. These barbets are aggressive towards smaller hole-nesters such as the Malabar barbet, sometimes destroying their nests by pecking at the entrance. Both sexes excavate the nest and it can take about 20 days to complete the nest. Eggs are laid about 3–5 days after nest excavation. About 3 eggs are laid. The incubation period is 14 to 15 days. During the day both sexes incubate, but at night, only the female sits on the eggs. The pair will defend their nests from palm squirrels which sometimes prey on the eggs. Chicks are fed an insect rich diet. The young leave the nest after 36 to 38 days.

The white-cheeked barbet is a primary cavity nester, chiseling out the trunk or a vertical branch of tree with a round entry hole. They breed from December to July, sometimes raising two broods. Favoured nest trees in urban areas include gulmohur (Delonix regia) and African tulip (Spathodea campanulata). These nest holes may also be used as roosts. They may reuse the same nest tree each year but often excavate a new entrance hole.
