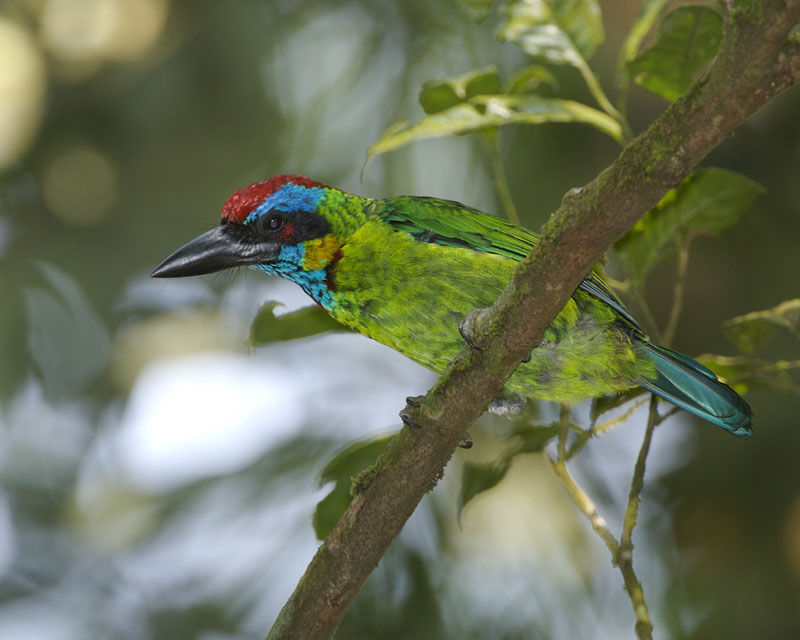

Conservation status
- Near Threatened (IUCN 3.1)

Scientific classification
- Kingdom: Animalia
- Phylum: Chordata
- Class: Aves
- Order: Piciformes
- Family: Megalaimidae
- Genus: Psilopogon
- Species: P. rafflesii

Binomial name
- Psilopogon rafflesii (Lesson, 1839)

Synonyms
- Megalaima rafflesii

= Red-crowned barbet =

Species of bird

The red-crowned barbet (Psilopogon rafflesii) is part of one of the two subfamilies of Megalaimidae birds. it is in the order of woodpeckers (Piciformes) and their relatives. It is distributed in Myanmar, Thailand, Malaysia, Singapore, Indonesia and Brunei. Its natural habitats are subtropical or tropical moist lowland forests and plantations with a distribution area of 3,180,000 km^{2} (1,230,000 sq mi).

== Description ==
The red-crowned barbet is a medium-large tropical bird, 24.5–27 cm (9.6–10.6 in) long and 99–150 g (3.5–5.3 oz) in weight. Both sexes are primarily green, with a red crown, red spots below the eyes, and a red mark on the side of the neck. The barbet wears a blue throat and broad supercilia accompanied by a black and yellow face. Immature and females resemble males with a duller colour scheme called monomorphism.

== Taxonomy ==
The red-crowned barbet belongs to the woodpecker order Piciformes in the family of Psilopogon. This lineage of the Barbet family can be traced to America, Asia and Africa. They separated into the New World (Americas) and the Old World (Asia and Africa) Barbets. Such genus of the Americas is the Toucan barbet, which separated before the Gilded barbet (Capito auratus) and Red-headed barbet (Eubucco), species that are represented as sister clades. In Africa, the yellow-billed barbet (Trachyphonus) separated before the white-headed barbet (Lybius), which diverged at a similar time as the bristle-nosed barbets (Gymnobucco) and their sister genus white-eared barbet Stactolaema. The yellow-fronted tinkerbird appears to be the last species to have diverged. In the Asian genus, Caloramphus diverged first leaving Meglaima and Psilopogon as sister clades. Nuclear and Mitochondrial DNA sequencing have found the barbet families and toucan families to be closely related to one another.

== Distribution and habitat ==
The red-crowned barbet inhabits the Sundaic upland and lowlands of south Tenasserim, Myanmar, peninsular Thailand, Sabah, Sarawak and Peninsular Malaysia, Singapore, Kalimantan and Sumatra, Indonesia and Brunei. It spends its days flying about the lower forest canopies of secondary and primary-growth forests. Farmers have seen them fly through rubber and durian (Durio zibethinus) plantations in search of food. It is also thought to inhabit sloped forests and evergreen lowlands. Due to deforestation in Singapore, the red-crowned barbet is restricted to Bukit Timah Nature Reserve.

== Behaviour and ecology ==
=== Diet ===
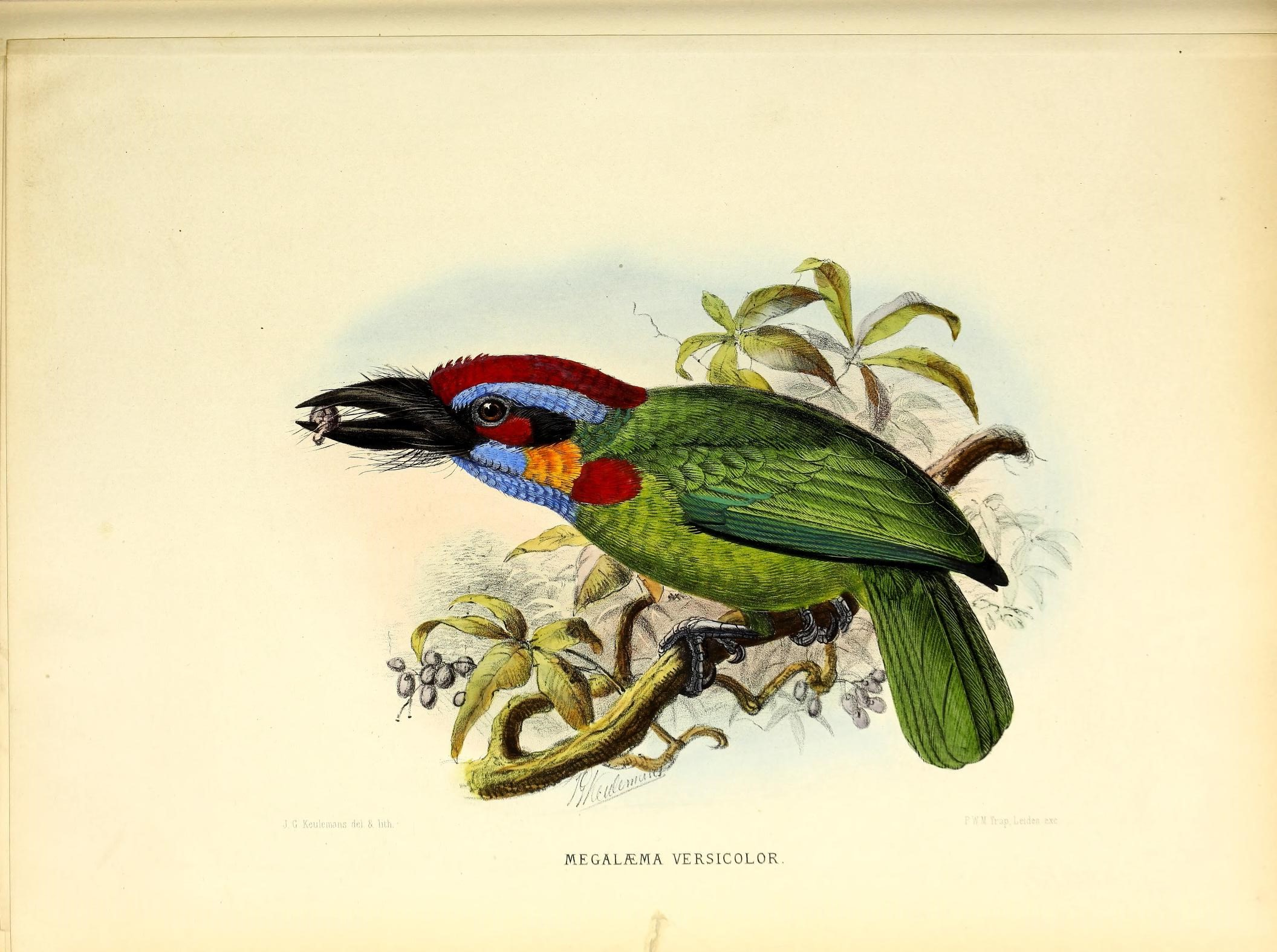
The Red Crowned Barbet feeding on fruits

The red-crowned barbet feeds on the lower fruit canopy and vines in the Pasoh Forest in Negeri Sembilan and Peninsular Malaysian rain forests. It also forages on crown canopy fruits such as figs of the Malayan banyan tree (Ficus microcarpa) in Tama Negara to which their long thick beak makes quick work to open the fig. It consumes a variety of fruit from oil fruits, MacArthur's palm, fishtail palm, turn-in-the-wind (Mallotus paniculatus), wild cinnamon (Cinnamomum iners) and salam (Syzygium polyanthum. It provides a source of seed spreading for the fig tree and may also defend its feeding territory from other barbets such as the brown barbet (Caloramphus fuliginosus), creating niche partitioning amongst the fig trees. A prey of the red-crowned barbet includes land snails of the genus Amphidromus. The red-crowned barbet's beak shape is also excellent for foraging for grubs, termites, mantis, moths, katydids and ants. It excavates rotten wood to grab a peak full of the grubs. It follows mixed species of insectivores and passerines foraging for food in the lower canopy. Essentially, it steal prey or forage in the same area for a chance at undiscovered food lurking in the dead wood. In Singapore, the green coffee tree (Canthium glabrum) is classified as endangered because of the foraging from the red-crowned barbet.

=== Reproduction ===
The breeding season for the barbets begins in April and ends in May for a total of 36 days. Before the courtship begins, the barbets release several loud and constant calls during the morning and evenings consisting of "kotroo kotroo" by the female and "kurro kuroo" by the male. Once a female has found a male, the courtship can begin. The male perches next to the female and begins to preen her feathers. If she accepts, the male flies off in search of insects and fruits. He returns and passes the food to the female to eat. After 10-20 minutes of this, the female initiates the coupling by using soft churning calls. She swings her tail horizontally, fluffs her feathers and pulls down her wings slightly.

The pair choose a specific dead tree to begin pecking a hole about 20-30ft above the ground. Scientists believe the position of the hole faces the south to protect the nests from the monsoon rains. As they begin pecking, bits of wood and dust are taken out by their beaks and tossed to the ground. Their nest is about 30 cm in depth with a smooth chamber at the bottom for the eggs. Entering their nest, they would pass through a tunnel of 4.5 cm in diameter before there is a slight drop towards the chamber, where it widens to about 16 cm (6.3 in). The smooth walls of the bowl mean the red-crowned barbet does not need any nesting material.

The female lays an average of three glossy white, elongated with an oval shaped end eggs. The average size of the eggs tends to be 26.20 mm^{2} × 20.30 mm^{2} (0.04061 sq in × 0.03147 sq in). The pair would exchange roles of incubating the eggs every 20 to 30 minutes for 14–15 days. Once the eggs hatch, the pair begin collecting food for the chicks. They would pass food directly to the chicks and take the fecal sacs out of the nest, keeping it clean. Once the younglings reach adolescence, based on the dull colorations on their forehead, the male and female would feed them from the entrance of the nest.

== Status ==
The red-crowned barbet is listed Near Threatened on the IUCN Red List.
