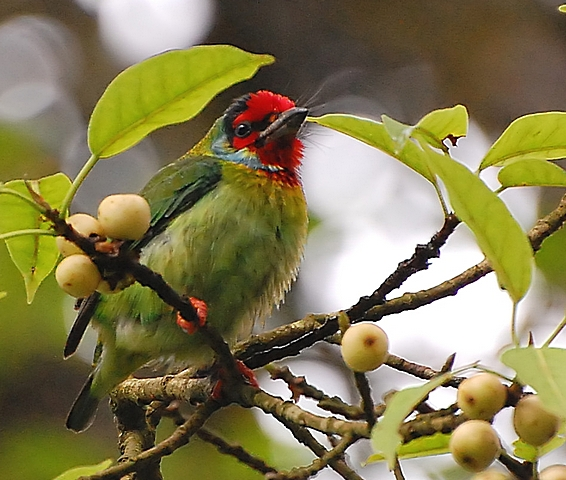
- Adult (Sakleshpur) Calls

Conservation status
- Least Concern (IUCN 3.1)

Scientific classification
- Kingdom: Animalia
- Phylum: Chordata
- Class: Aves
- Order: Piciformes
- Family: Megalaimidae
- Genus: Psilopogon
- Species: P. malabaricus

Binomial name
- Psilopogon malabaricus (Blyth, 1847)
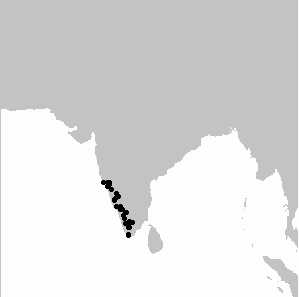

Synonyms
- Bucco malabaricus, Xantholaema malabarica, Megalaima malabarica

= Malabar barbet =

Species of bird

The Malabar barbet (Psilopogon malabaricus) is an Asian barbet native to the Western Ghats in India. It was formerly treated as a race of the crimson-fronted barbet (Psilopogon rubricapillus). It overlaps in some places with the range of the coppersmith barbet (Psilopogon haemacephala) and has a similar but more rapid call.

== Description ==
Cotigao NP, Goa, India Nov 1997

This species can be told apart from the coppersmith barbet by the crimson face and throat. The call notes are more rapidly delivered than in the other species.

== Distribution and habitat ==
This species is found in the Western Ghats from around Goa south to southern Kerala in moist evergreen forest mainly below 1200 m elevation. They are also found in coffee estates. They often visit fruiting Ficus species, joining flocks of green pigeon and mynas.

== Behaviour and ecology ==
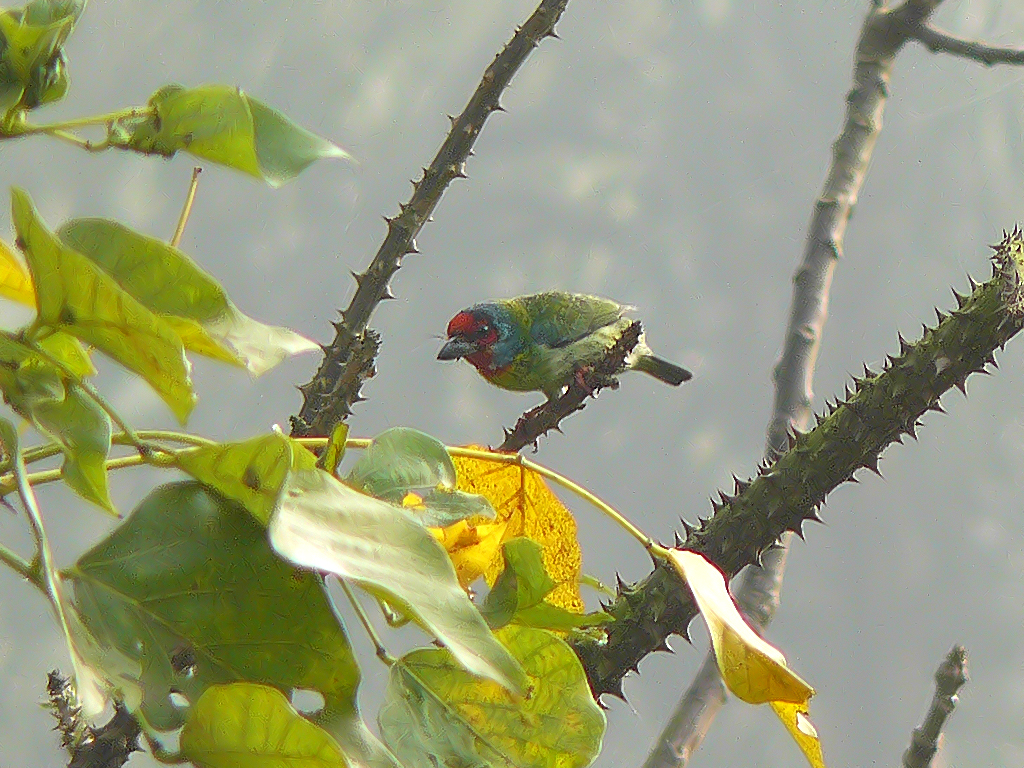
Adult on an Erythrina

These birds are usually seen in pairs during the breeding season but are gregarious in the non-breeding season. In flight, their straight and rapid flight can resemble that of lorikeets. The breeding season is mainly February–March prior to the rains. The nest hole is excavated on the underside of thin branches. It takes about 18 days to excavate the nest. These nest holes are often destroyed by larger barbets that may attempt to enlarge the hole. A nest is made each year. Multiple holes may be made and any extra hole may be used for roosting. Two eggs are laid in a clutch. They are incubated for 14 to 15 days. Eggs may be preyed upon by palm squirrels (Funambulus sp.) and they are usually chased away by the adult birds. Unhatched eggs are removed by the parents. For the first week the chicks are fed insects after which they are fed fruits. The chicks fledge in about 35 days.

The species feeds mainly on fruits but sometimes takes grubs, termites (flycatching at emerging swarms of alates), ants and small caterpillars. In Kerala, the fruiting trees were limited mainly to Ficus species, especially Ficus retusa, Ficus gibbosa and Ficus tsiela. When feeding on small fruits, they tend to perch and peck rather than to swallow the fruit whole. In the non-breeding season, they join mixed-species foraging flocks.

== Other sources ==
- Yahya, HSA (1990) Dietary requirement of Crimson Throated Barbet. Zoos' Print Journal 5(11):7
- Yahya, HSA (1980) A comparative study of ecology and biology of Barbets, Megalaima spp. (Capitonidae: Piciformes) with special reference to Megalaima viridis (Boddaert) and M. rubricapilla malabarica (Blyth) at Periyar Tiger Reserve, Kerala. Ph. D. Thesis, University of Bombay.
