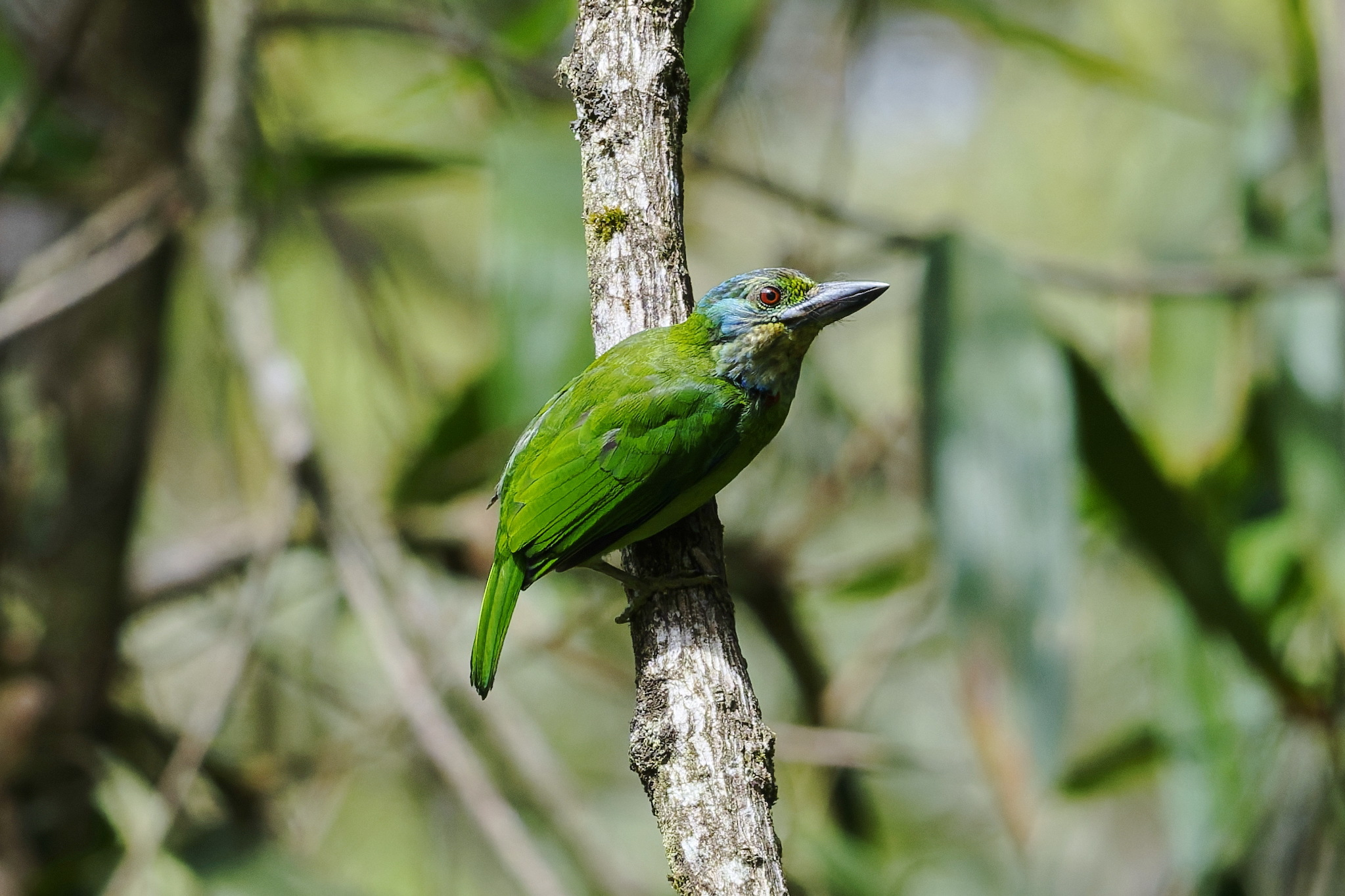

Conservation status
- Least Concern (IUCN 3.1)

Scientific classification
- Kingdom: Animalia
- Phylum: Chordata
- Class: Aves
- Order: Piciformes
- Family: Megalaimidae
- Genus: Psilopogon
- Species: P. monticola

Binomial name
- Psilopogon monticola (Sharpe, 1889)

Synonyms
- Megalaima monticola

= Mountain barbet =

Species of bird

The mountain barbet (Psilopogon monticola) is a species of bird in the family Megalaimidae. It is endemic to the Southeast Asian island of Borneo. Its natural habitats are subtropical or tropical moist lowland forests and subtropical or tropical moist montane forests.

They resemble female red-throated barbet - except, they have smaller bills and lack the red spot at the base of the rictal bristles ("whiskers") on each side of the upper bill.

== Behaviour and ecology ==
Mountain barbets primarily feed on fruits, but will also eat a wide range of insects, such as ants, cicadas, dragonflies, crickets, locusts, beetles, moths and mantids.

These birds nest in tree holes and hens usually lay 2 to 4 eggs, which are incubated for 13 to 15 days.
