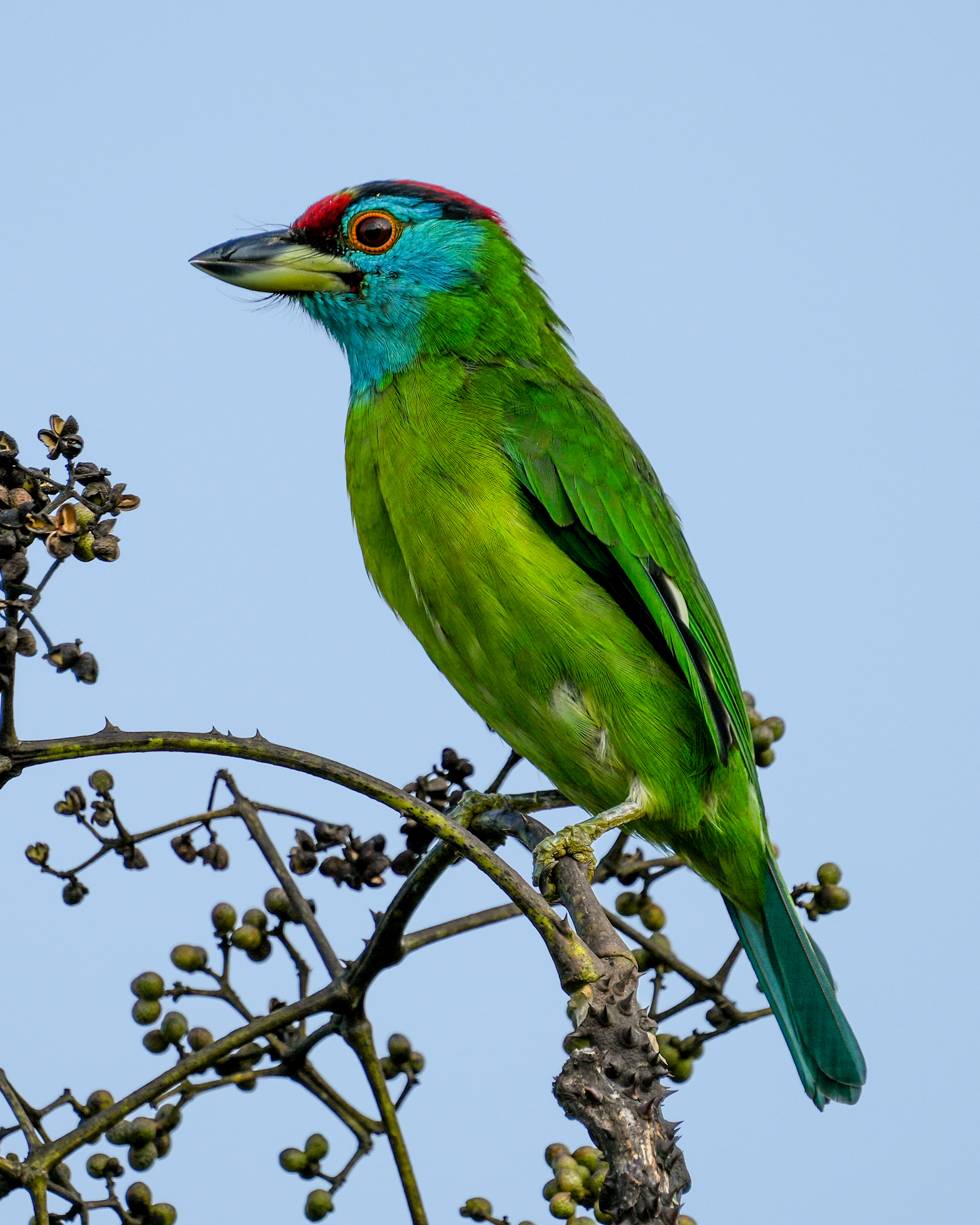
- Foraging on a fruiting tree in Meghalaya

Conservation status
- Least Concern (IUCN 3.1)

Scientific classification
- Kingdom: Animalia
- Phylum: Chordata
- Class: Aves
- Order: Piciformes
- Family: Megalaimidae
- Genus: Psilopogon
- Species: P. asiaticus

Binomial name
- Psilopogon asiaticus (Latham, 1790)
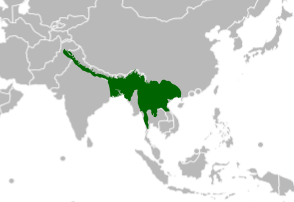
- Distribution of the blue-throated barbet

Synonyms
- Cyanops davisoni Megalaima asiatica

= Blue-throated barbet =

Species of bird

The blue-throated barbet (Psilopogon asiaticus) is a green Asian barbet native to the foothills of the Himalayas and Southeast Asia. It inhabits lowland and montane forests at elevations of 200–2,000 m (660–6,560 ft), frequenting fruiting trees. Due to its green colour, it is difficult to spot but is easily located by its continual loud calls. Sexes are similar in most respects and share domestic duties.

== Taxonomy ==
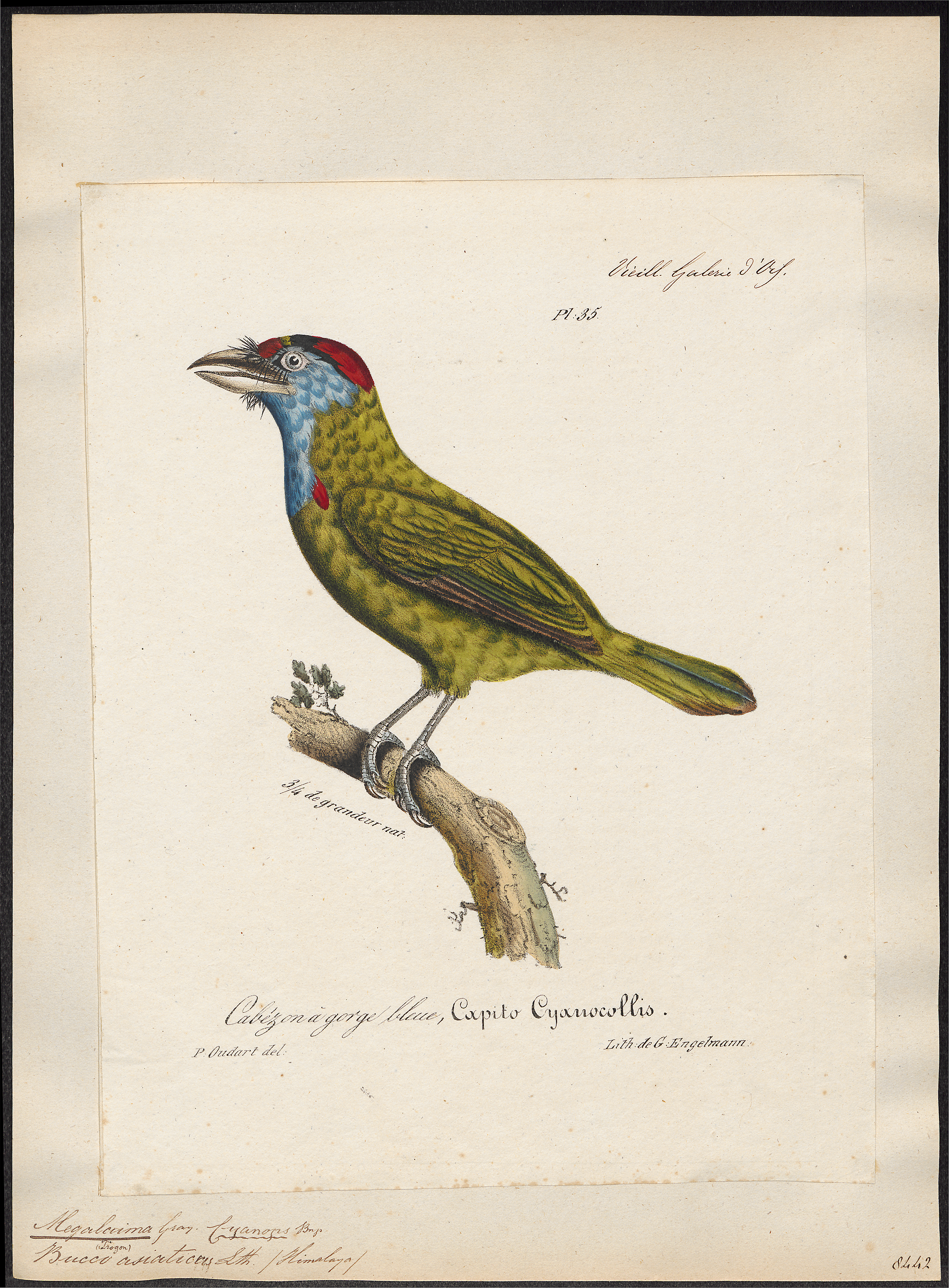
Painting ca. 1825 to 1834

The Blue-throated Barbet was originally placed in the genus Cyanops by Latham in 1790. This was subsequently synonymized with Megalaima. In 2013, phylogenetic studies indicated that Psilopogon is embedded within Megalaima. Psilopogon has priority, hence the genus Megalaima was subsumed into Psilopogon. The Blue-throated Barbet has previously been considered conspecific with the Turquoise-throated Barbet (Psilopogon chersonesus) and the Mountain Barbet (Psilopogon monticola) (11), but molecular data confirm that these are distinct species.

Psilopogon asiaticus has two sub-species:

- Red-crowned blue-throated barbet P.a. asiaticus (Latham, 1790) is resident from NE Pakistan to W, N Myanmar and SW Yunnan
- Blue-crowned blue-throated barbet P.a. davisoni (Hume, 1877) is resident from SE Myanmar to SE Yunnan and N Indochina

== Description ==
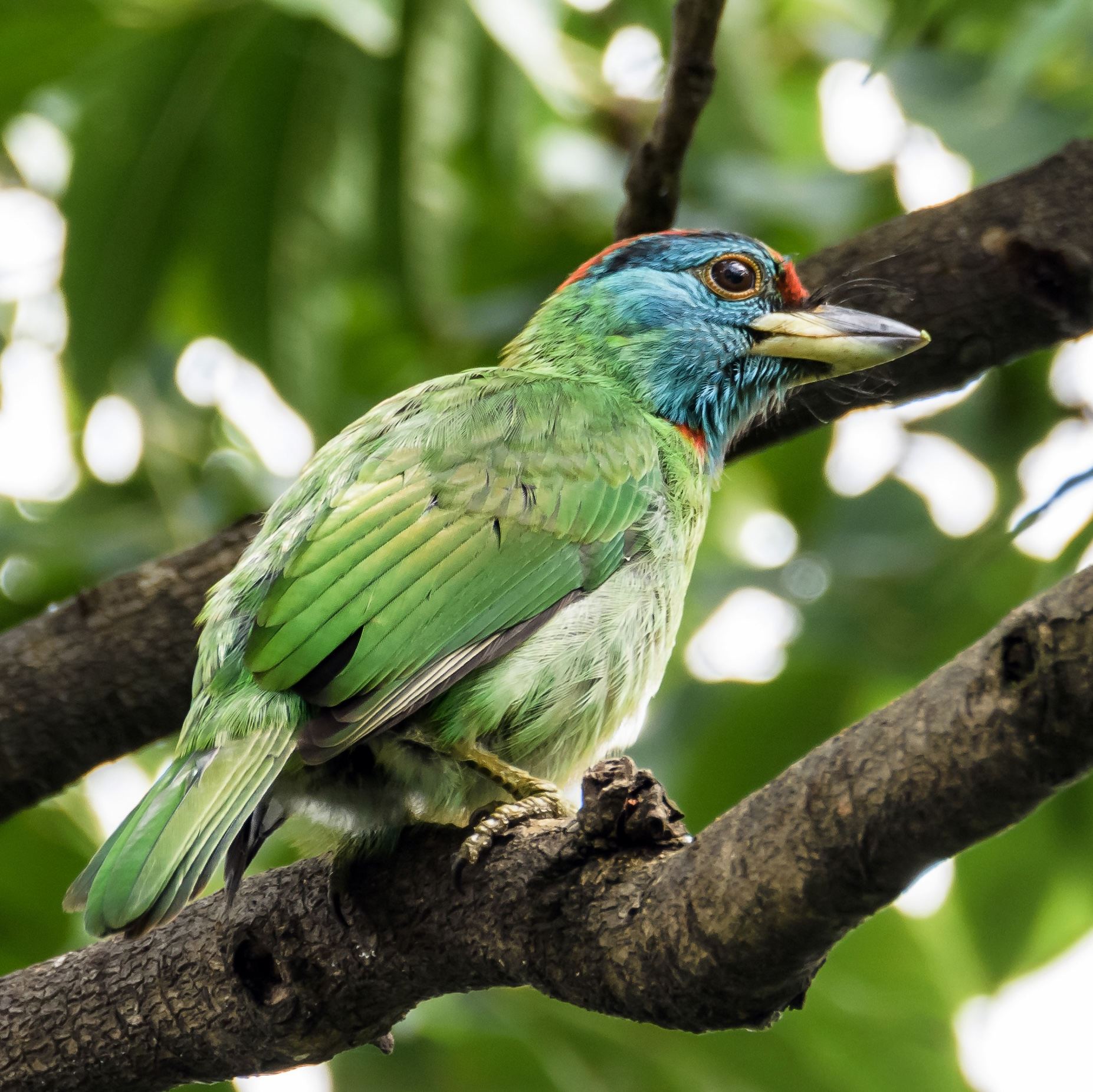
Juvenile in Nepal

The blue-throated barbet is a non-migratory, arboreal medium-sized barbet, about the size of a myna 19–22 cm (7.5–8.7 in). Sexes are similar though the female is slightly heavier with 87–103 g (3.1–3.6 oz) than the male with 79–100 g (2.8–3.5 oz). It is a stocky, green bird with a short tail. The undersides are a lighter yellow-green. The underside of the tail may have a bluish cast. The head and neck are distinctive, with a bright red forehead, black stripe across the crown and red rear crown. The sides of the face, chin and upper neck are pale blue. Red patches are seen on the sides of the neck at the base of the blue. The iris is reddish-brown and the eye-ring is brown, greenish-brown, orange-brown or yellow. The feet are slate-gray to gray-green. The stout, conical bill is pale at the base with a dark upper mandible and tip.

Juveniles are similar to the adults, with muted and dull colours. The red may be tinged with orange, the black may be blue-black or dusky.

== Distribution and habitat ==
The blue-throated barbet is a resident breeder in the Lower Himalayas from northeastern Pakistan through northern and northeastern India, and in the hill ranges of Southeast Asia. It is a common inhabitant of lowland and foothill tropical, evergreen and deciduous forests, typically between 200–2,000 m (660–6,560 ft). It is adaptable to secondary forests and even urban areas provided fruiting trees are readily available. In Mizoram, it is uncommon in oil plantations, presumably due to the lack of fruit-bearing trees.

== Behaviour and ecology ==
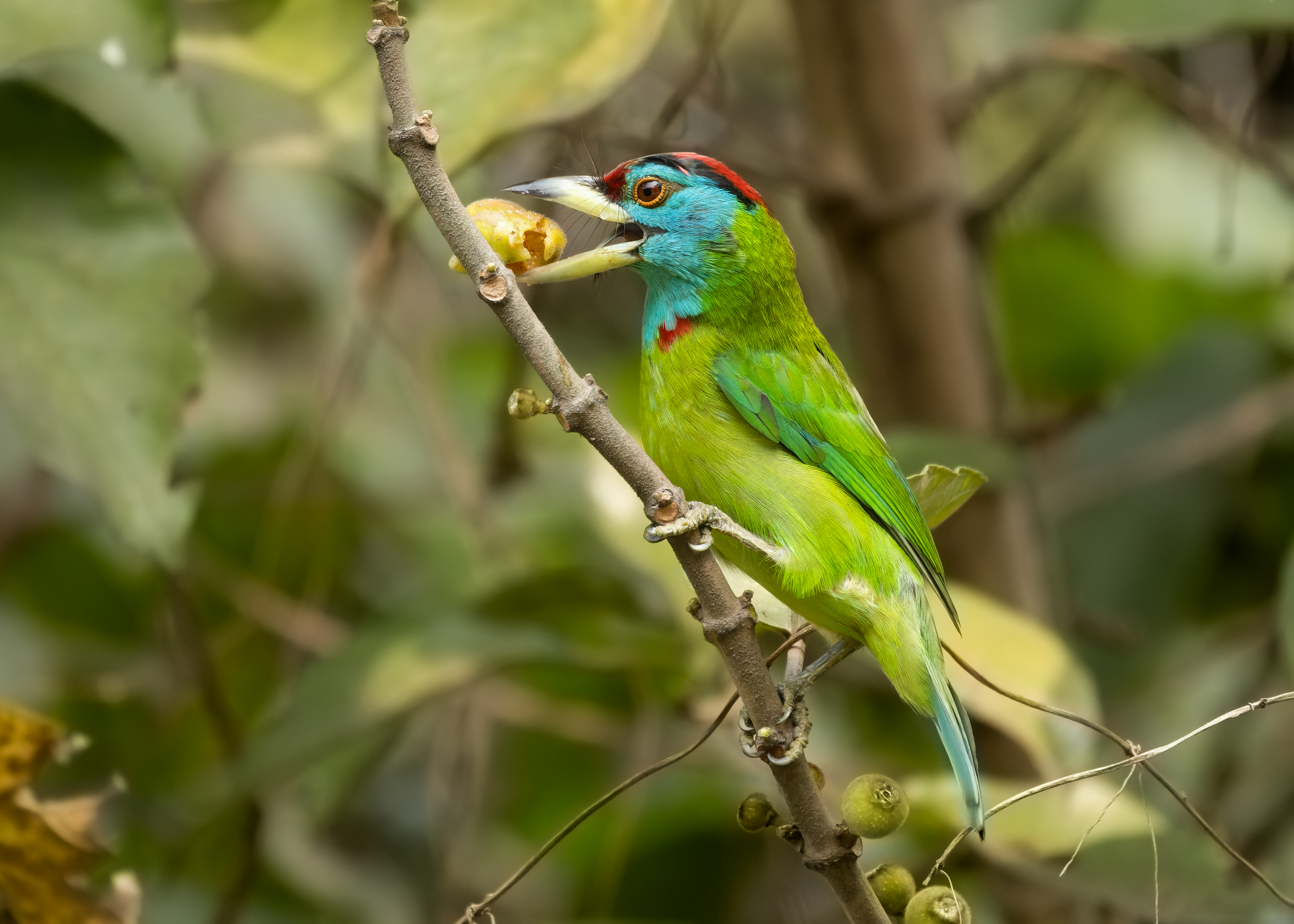
Eating in Rabindra Sarobar, West Bengal, India.

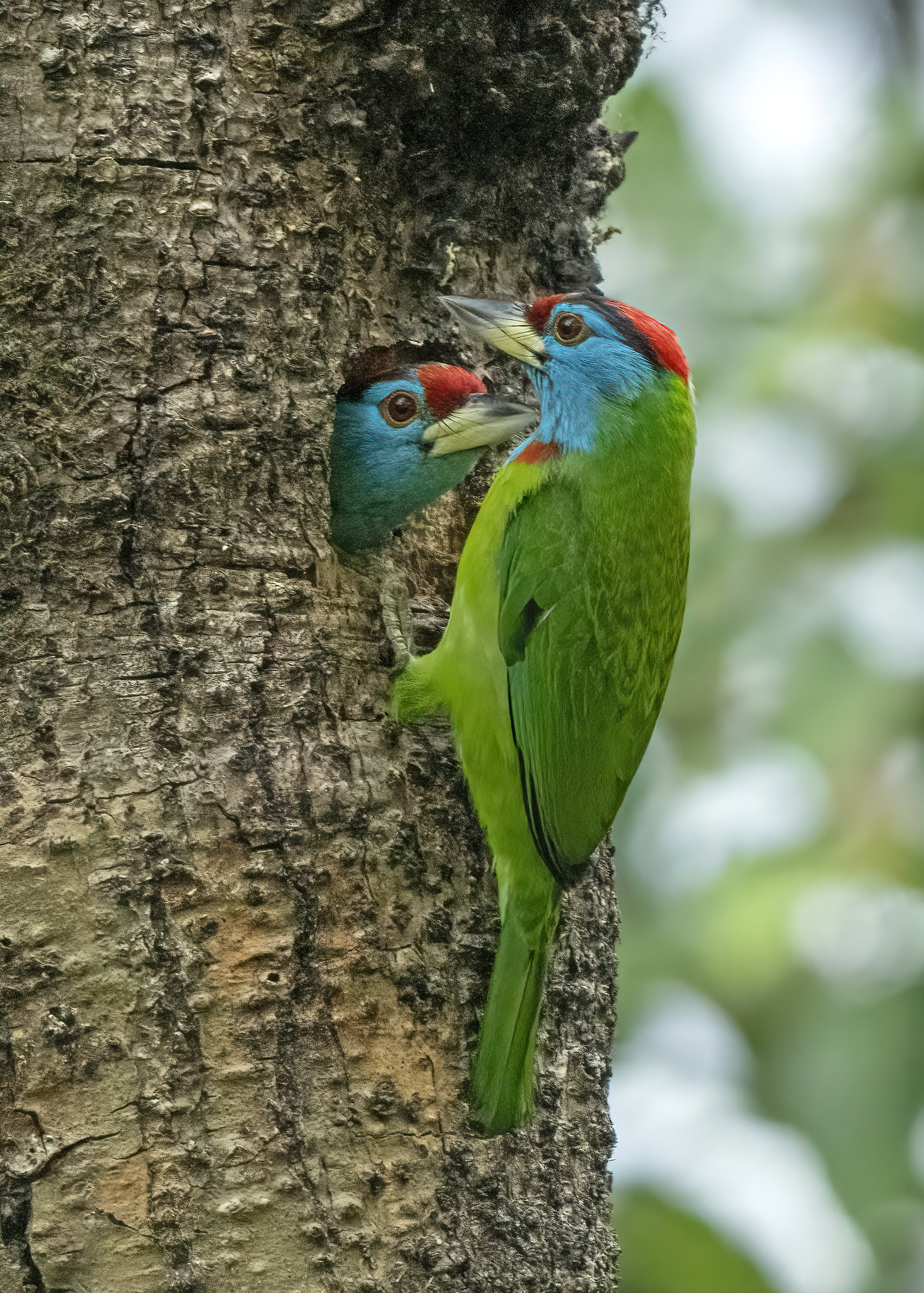
Pair at a nest in a tree trunk

Making a hole in a tree for nesting in Rabindra Sarobar, India

The blue-throated barbet has a noisy, undulating flight. The flight consists of a few rapid beats of its wings, then a brief pause. It calls frequently throughout the day. Due to its green colour it blends into the canopy so the loud, frequent calls are often the only indication of its presence. The calls consisting of the notes took-a-rook, pu-ku-ruk, kut-ru-uk are repeated 90-105 times per minute.

=== Diet ===
The blue-throated barbet feeds on fruits and berries, especially figs of Ficus species. It is often seen in the upper canopy of fruiting trees, singly and in groups. It also eats insect larvae, crickets, mantids and large centipedes while perched, and sometimes catches flying termites in the air.

=== Breeding ===
Both parents share the duties of building nests, incubation and raising of the young. While courting, pairs feed and vocalise together. Display during courting includes bobbing and twisting of the head and wagging of the tail. The nesting season is March to June. Nests are made by excavating holes in tree trunks and sloping branches. The nests are usually between 3–7.5 m (9.8–24.6 ft) above the ground. Dead tree trunks are also used. The nest may be lined with wood chips and sometimes grasses. Nests are reused over several years. Old nests of woodpeckers may be taken over.

The female lays 3-4 matte-white eggs. The eggs are incubated for 14 days with both parents ensuring continuous incubation. After the chicks hatch, they remain with the parents for a short duration only.

== Conservation and threats ==
The blue-throated barbet is not threatened, but categorised as Least Concern on the IUCN Red List, as the population is thought to be stable. It is a common bird in northeast India.
