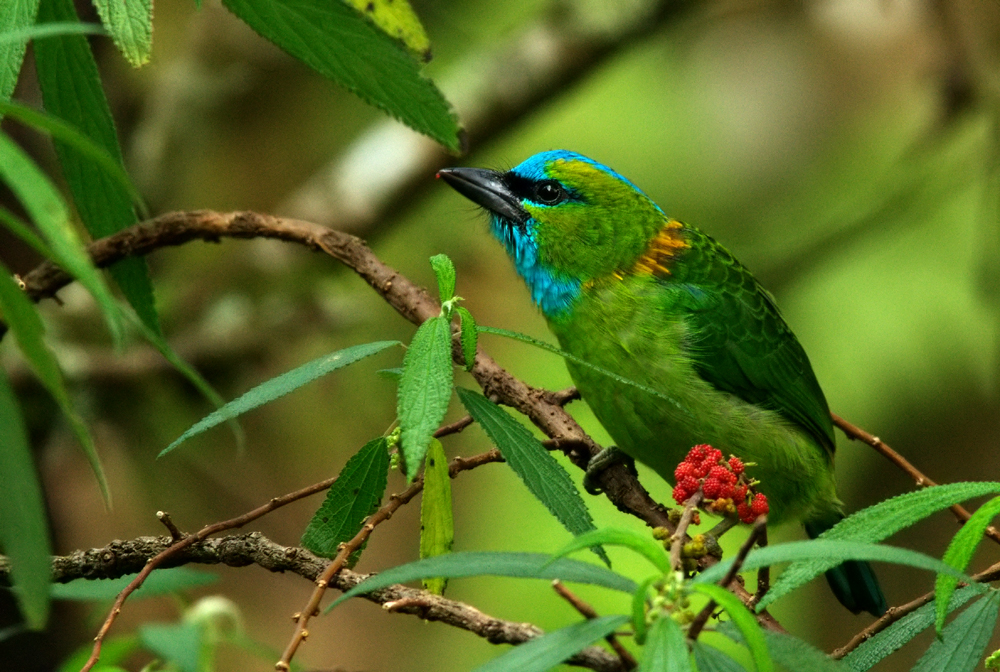
- Golden-naped barbet from Mt. Kinabalu, Borneo. Malaysia

Conservation status
- Least Concern (IUCN 3.1)

Scientific classification
- Kingdom: Animalia
- Phylum: Chordata
- Class: Aves
- Order: Piciformes
- Family: Megalaimidae
- Genus: Psilopogon
- Species: P. pulcherrimus

Binomial name
- Psilopogon pulcherrimus (Sharpe, 1888)

Synonyms
- Megalaima pulcherrimus

= Golden-naped barbet =

Species of bird

The golden-naped barbet (Psilopogon pulcherrimus) is a member of the family Megalaimidae. It is found in Indonesia and Malaysia, where it is endemic to the island of Borneo. Its natural habitats are subtropical or tropical moist lowland forest and subtropical or tropical moist montane forest.

== Description ==
Medium-sized bird (20-21.5 cm); overall stocky built. Bill- thick and distinctive. Body coloration, primarily green. Wings having darker shade of green compared to underparts. Azure blue on forehead, extending up to nape; blue coloration on throat. Small but distinct yellow nape forms a collar. A distinctive black band from the base of bill to eye. Black pupils. Black mandibles. Greyish green tarsus

== Distribution ==
Endemic to lowland and montane forests of Borneo. It is presumably a resident species in this region. Most often reported from Mount Kinabalu and Trus Madi south to Mulu and Murud.

== Behaviour and ecology ==
Primarily feeds on fruits and berries. Occasionally takes insects like other barbet species. They are often found foraging in the mid-storey layer of the forest and are known to nest in tree cavities.
