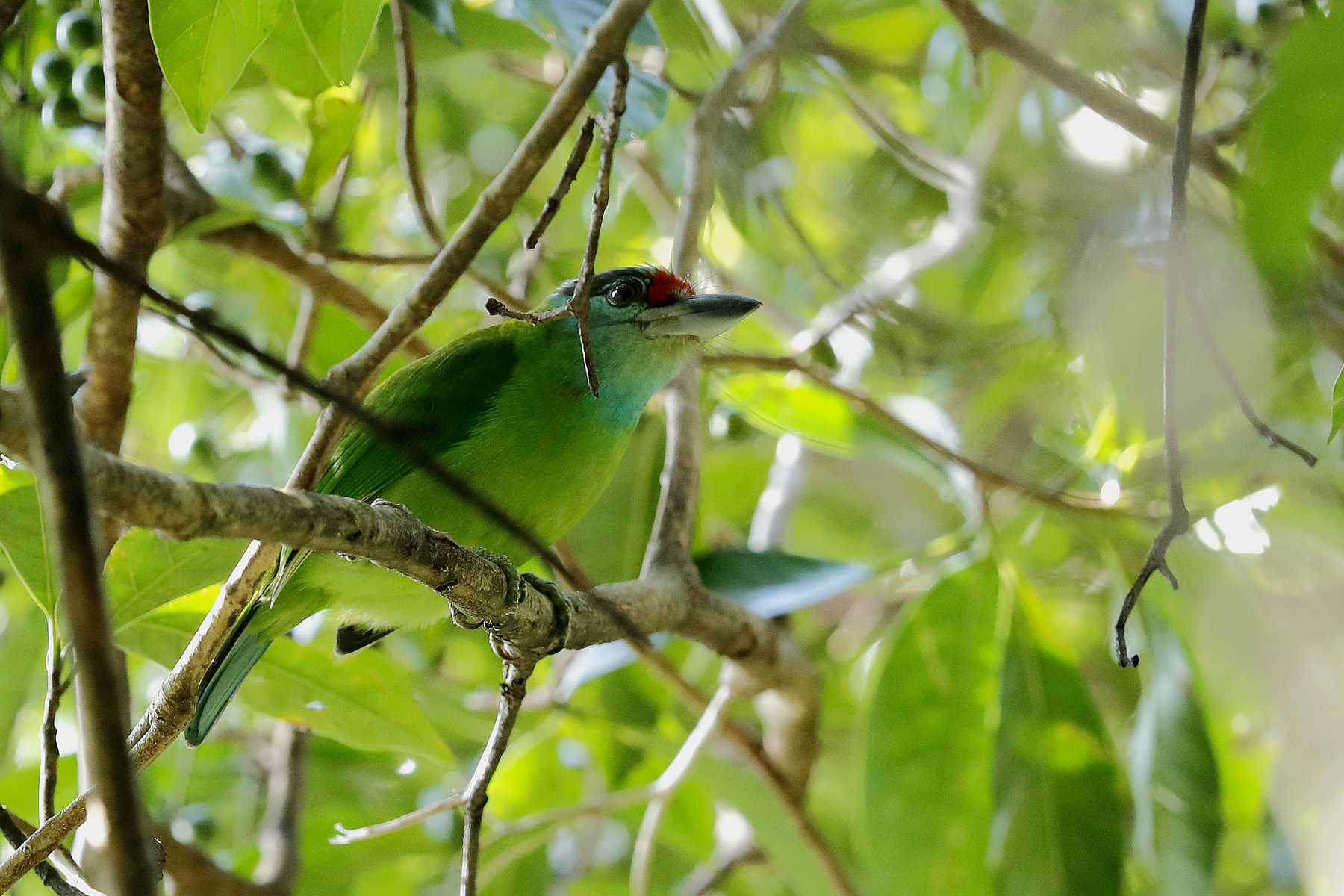

Conservation status
- Least Concern (IUCN 3.1)

Scientific classification
- Kingdom: Animalia
- Phylum: Chordata
- Class: Aves
- Order: Piciformes
- Family: Megalaimidae
- Genus: Psilopogon
- Species: P. chersonesus

Binomial name
- Psilopogon chersonesus (Chasen & Kloss, 1927)

= Turquoise-throated barbet =

Species of bird

The turquoise-throated barbet (Psilopogon chersonesus) is an Asian barbet found in Thailand. The barbets get their name from the bristles which fringe their heavy bills; this species eats fruits and insects. It used to be considered a subspecies of the blue-throated barbet.
