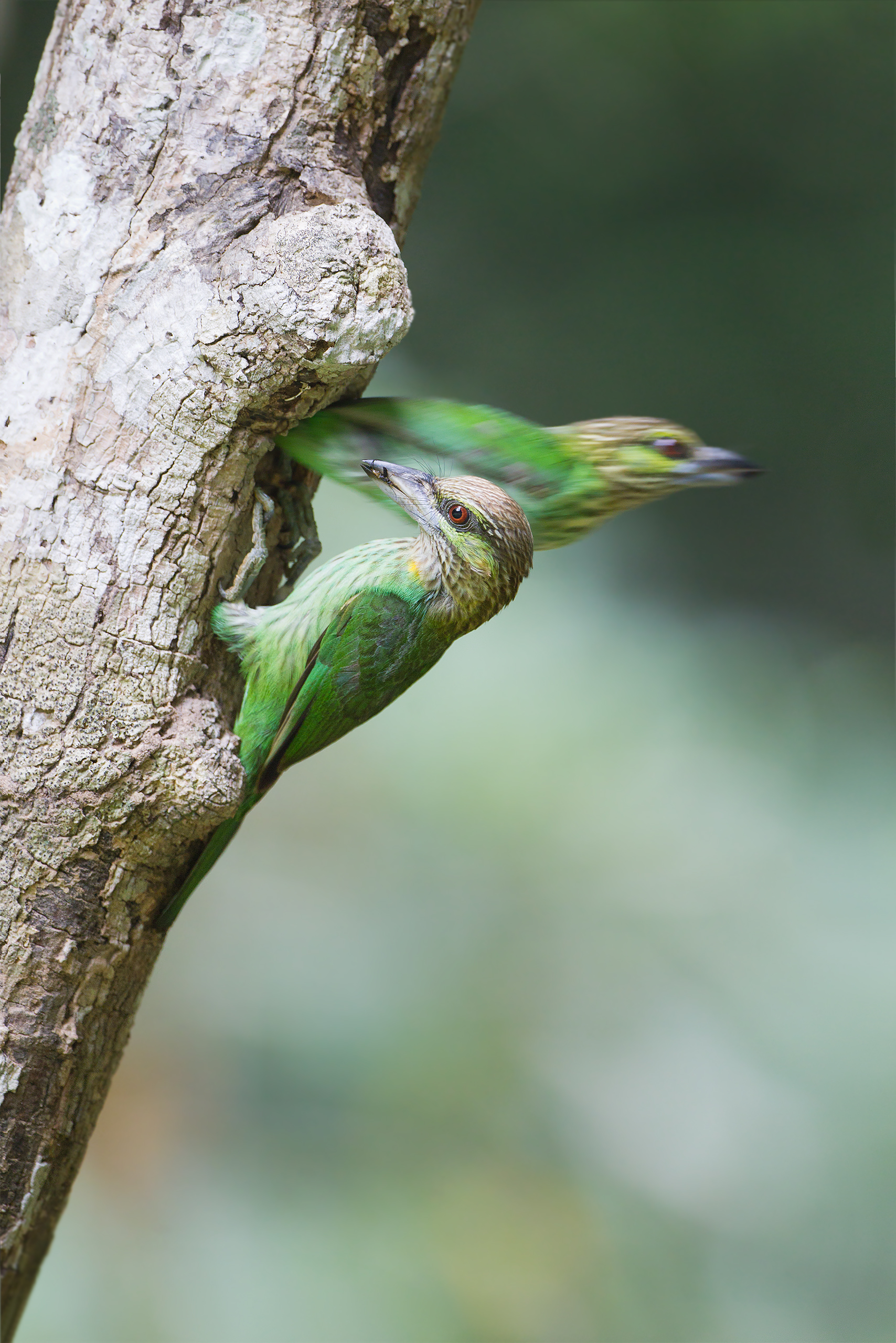

Conservation status
- Least Concern (IUCN 3.1)

Scientific classification
- Kingdom: Animalia
- Phylum: Chordata
- Class: Aves
- Order: Piciformes
- Family: Megalaimidae
- Genus: Psilopogon
- Species: P. faiostrictus

Binomial name
- Psilopogon faiostrictus (Temminck, 1832)

Synonyms
- Megalaima faiostricta

= Green-eared barbet =

Species of bird

The green-eared barbet (Psilopogon faiostrictus) is an Asian barbet.

== Characteristics ==
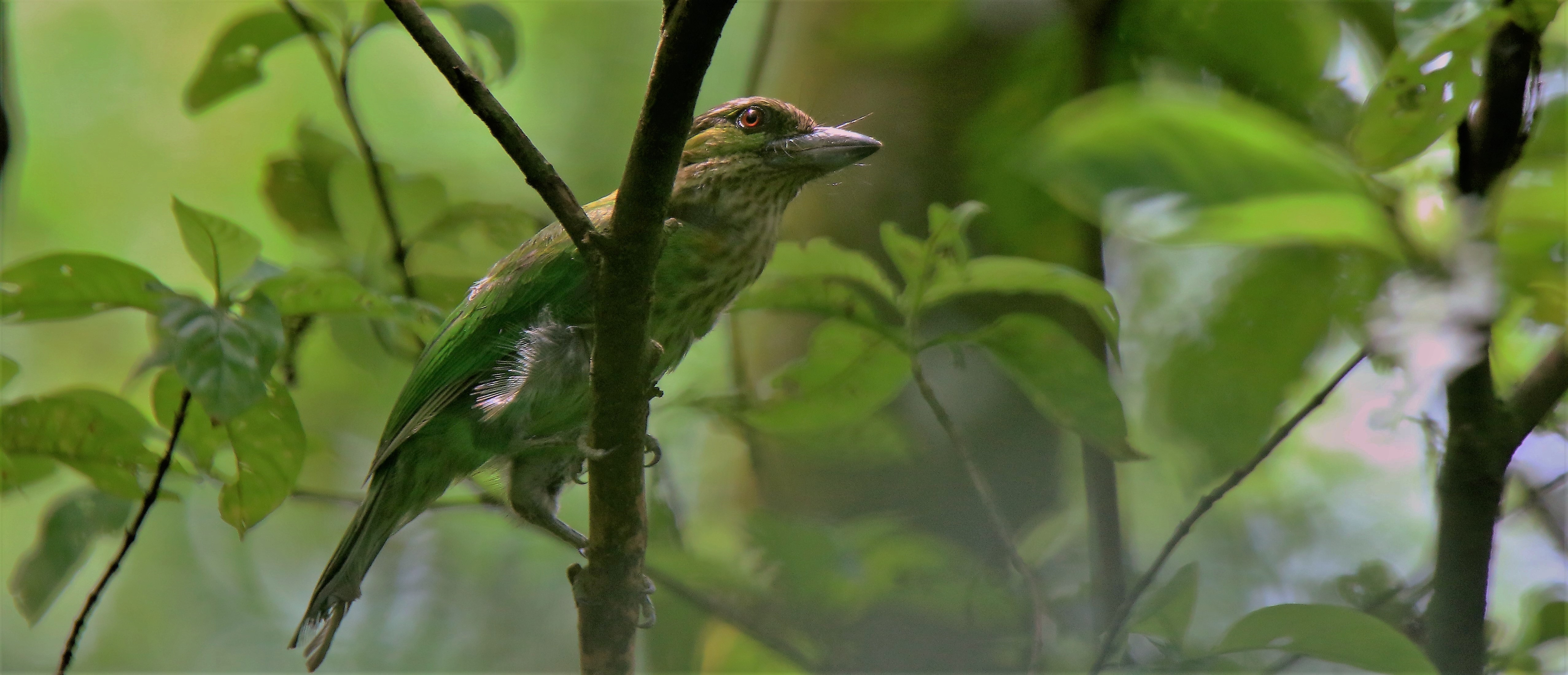
Green-eared Barbet

The green-eared barbet is 24.5–27 cm in length. It is a plump bird, with a short neck, large head and short tail. The adult has a white-streaked brown head and breast, green ear coverts, mainly dark bill, and green-streaked yellow belly. The rest of the plumage is green. Both sexes and immature birds are similar. This species resembles lineated barbet, but is smaller, has the distinctive green ear patch, a darker bill and a dark, rather than yellow, eye-ring.

== Distribution and habitat ==
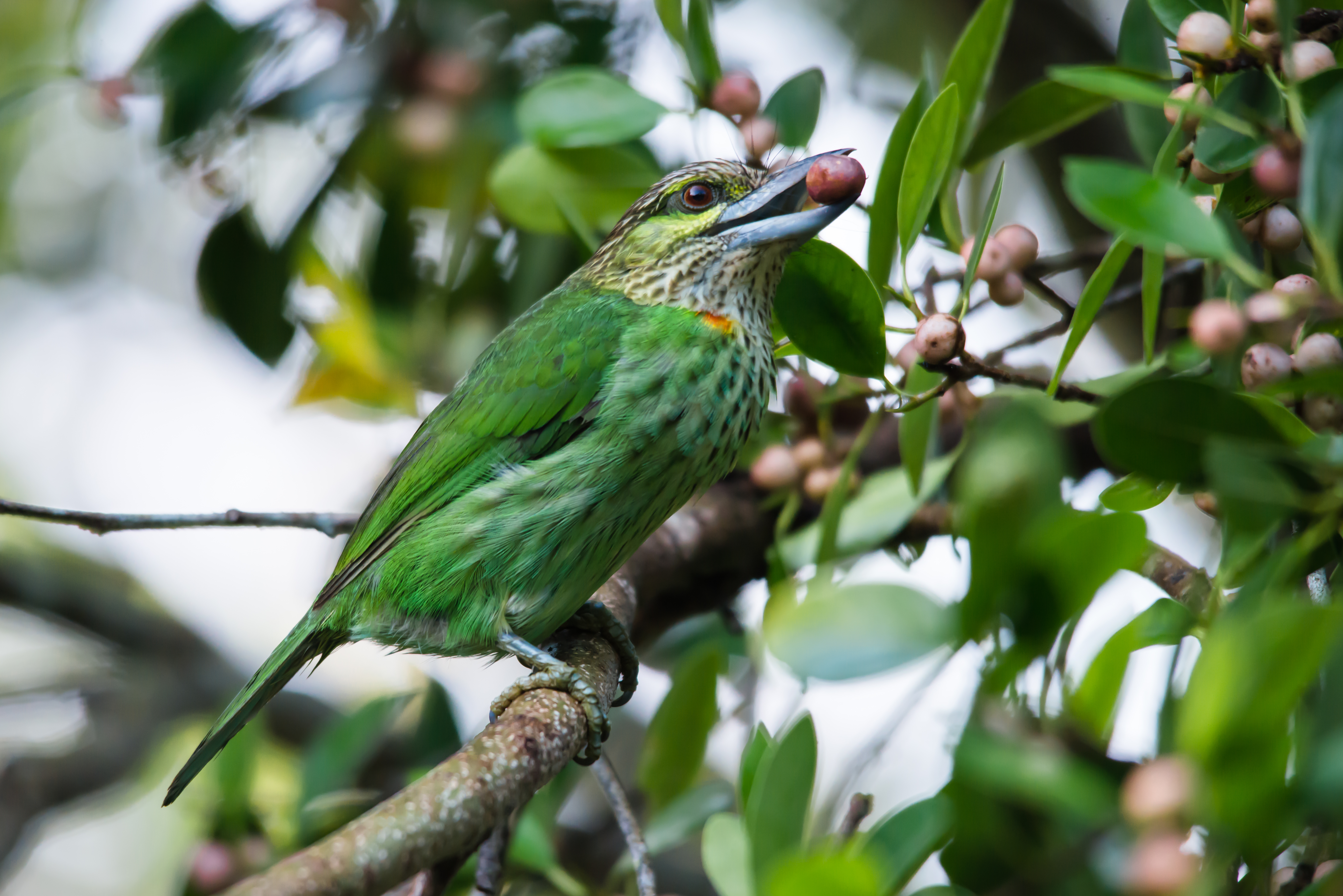
A green-eared barbet in Khao Yai National Park

The green-eared barbet is a resident breeder in southern China, Cambodia, Laos, Thailand and Vietnam. It inhabits broadleaf evergreen and mixed or open woodlands at up to 900 m (3,000 ft) elevation.

== Behaviour and ecology ==
A green-eared barbet in Khao Yai National Park

It nests in a tree hole.
