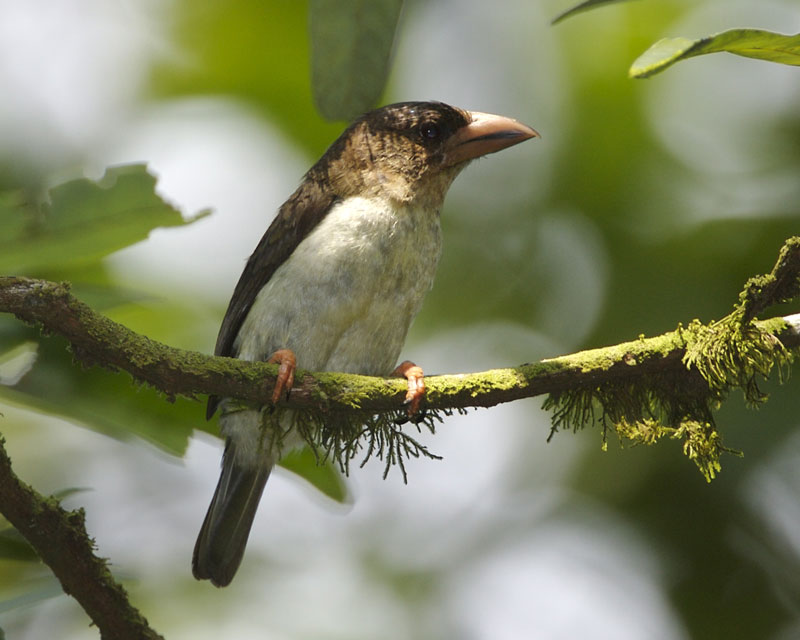
- in Panti Forest, Johor, Malaysia

Conservation status
- Near Threatened (IUCN 3.1)

Scientific classification
- Kingdom: Animalia
- Phylum: Chordata
- Class: Aves
- Order: Piciformes
- Family: Megalaimidae
- Genus: Caloramphus
- Species: C. hayii

Binomial name
- Caloramphus hayii (Gray, JE, 1831)

= Malayan brown barbet =

Species of bird

The Malayan brown barbet or sooty barbet (Caloramphus hayii) is a species of bird in the family Megalaimidae. It is found in Malaysia, Myanmar, Thailand, Sumatra and formerly Singapore where it is extirpated. Its natural habitat is subtropical or tropical moist lowland forests.

This species is split from the Bornean brown barbet (C. fuliginosus) which is an endemic species on Borneo.
