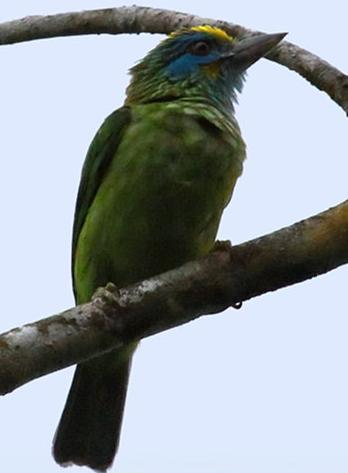
- In Sinharaja Forest Reserve, Sri Lanka

Conservation status
- Least Concern (IUCN 3.1)

Scientific classification
- Kingdom: Animalia
- Phylum: Chordata
- Class: Aves
- Order: Piciformes
- Family: Megalaimidae
- Genus: Psilopogon
- Species: P. flavifrons

Binomial name
- Psilopogon flavifrons (Cuvier, 1816)
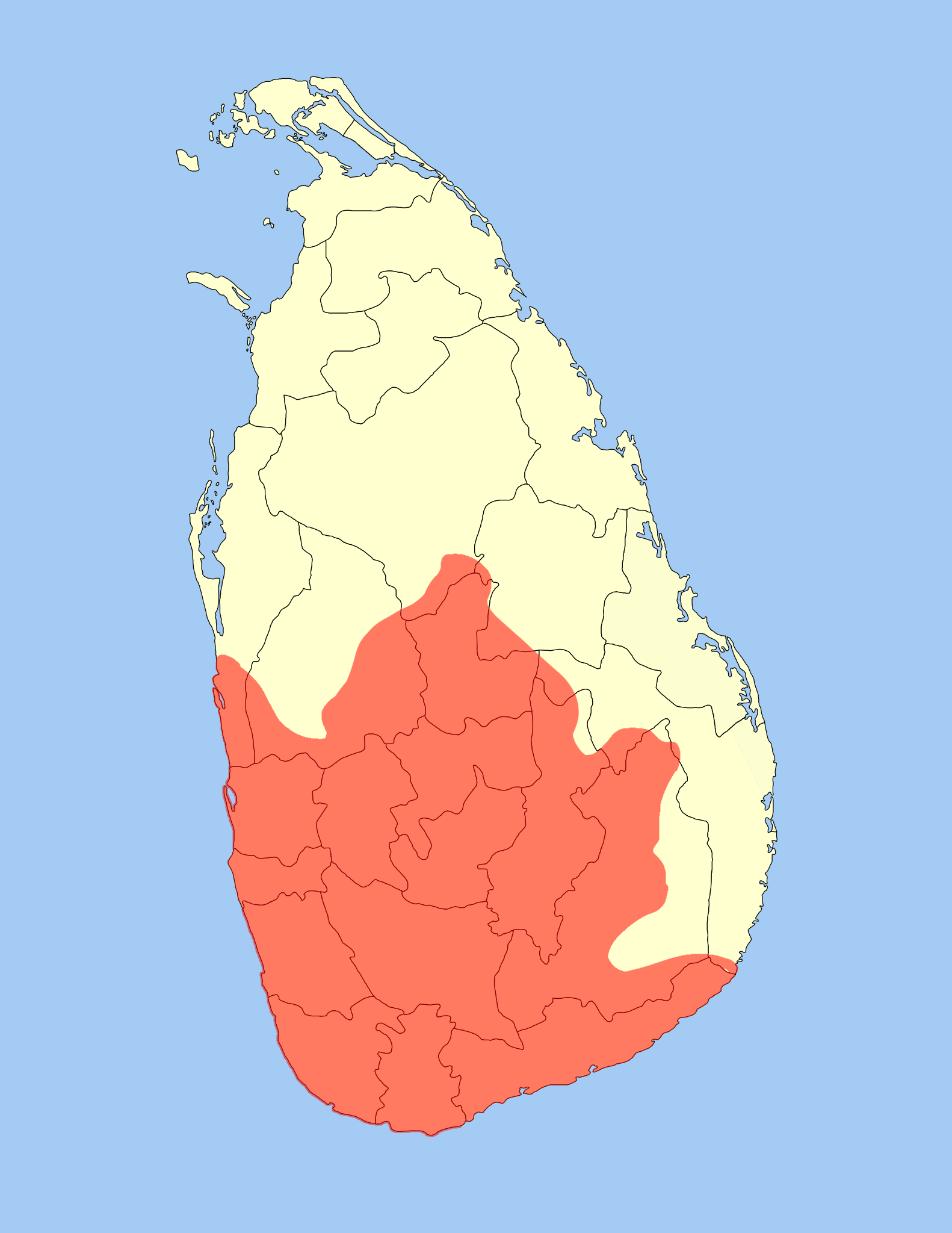

Synonyms
- Megalaima flavifrons

= Yellow-fronted barbet =

Species of bird

The yellow-fronted barbet (Psilopogon flavifrons) is an Asian barbet, which is an endemic resident breeder in Sri Lanka, where it inhabits subtropical and tropical moist forests, wetlands, plantations and rural gardens up to an altitude of 2,000 m (6,600 ft).

== Description ==
It has green plumage with a yellow crown and blue patches below the eyes, on the throat and the chin. It is 21–22 cm (8.3–8.7 in) long and weighs 57–60 g (2.0–2.1 oz). It feeds on berries, fruits and occasionally insects. It nests in a tree hole, where it lays 2-3 eggs.

== In culture ==
The yellow-fronted barbet appears on a 5 rupee Sri Lankan postal stamp.
