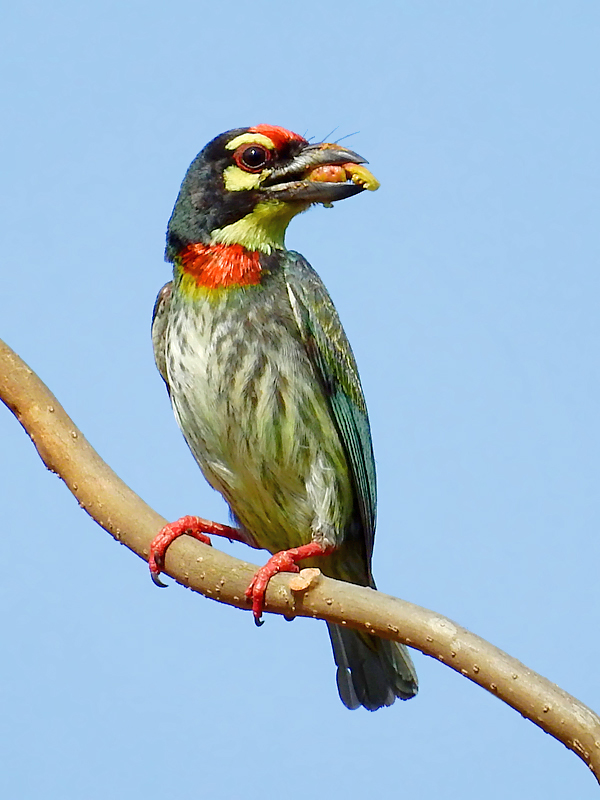
- P. h. indicus from India Call

Conservation status
- Least Concern (IUCN 3.1)

Scientific classification
- Kingdom: Animalia
- Phylum: Chordata
- Class: Aves
- Order: Piciformes
- Family: Megalaimidae
- Genus: Psilopogon
- Species: P. haemacephalus

Binomial name
- Psilopogon haemacephalus (Statius Müller, 1776)

Synonyms
- Xantholaoema haemacephala, Megalaima haemacephala

= Coppersmith barbet =

Species of bird

The coppersmith barbet (Psilopogon haemacephalus), also called crimson-breasted barbet and coppersmith, is an Asian barbet with crimson forehead and throat, known for its metronomic call that sounds similar to a coppersmith striking metal with a hammer. It is a resident bird in the Indian subcontinent and parts of Southeast Asia. It carves out holes inside a tree to build its nest. It is predominantly frugivorous, but has been observed eating insects, especially winged termites.

== Description ==
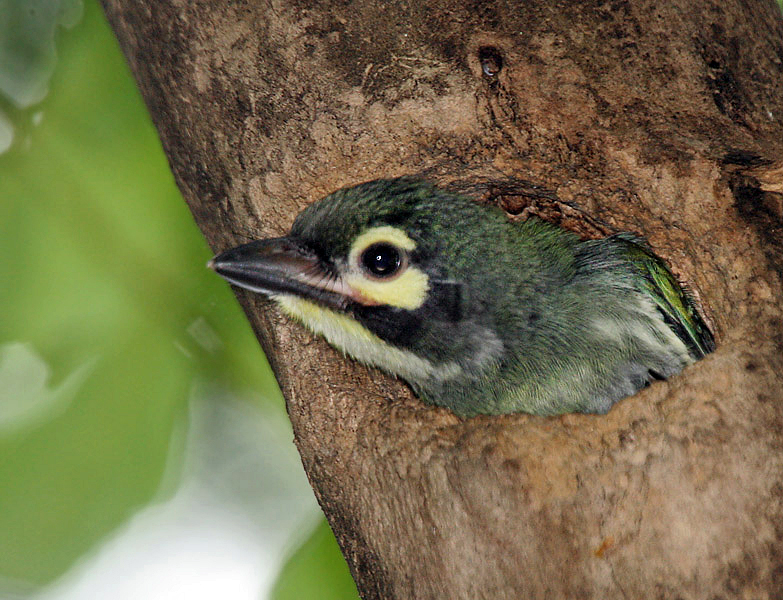
Juvenile coppersmith barbet in Kolkata

The coppersmith barbet is green with a red head, yellow cheeks and a yellow throat. Its underparts are streaked in grey and black. During the nesting season, the wear and tear on the feathers can cause the plumage of the upper back to appear bluish. It is 15–17 cm (5.9–6.7 in) long and weighs 30–52.6 g (1.06–1.86 oz).

== Taxonomy ==
Bucco haemacephalus was the scientific name proposed by Philipp Ludwig Statius Müller in 1776 for a barbet from the Philippines. Bucco indicus was proposed by John Latham in 1790 for a streaked barbet from India with a black head and red forehead. Bucco roseus was proposed by Charles Dumont de Sainte-Croix in 1816. Asian barbets were placed in the genus Megalaima proposed by George Robert Gray in 1842 who suggested to use this name instead of Bucco. Xantholaema intermedia proposed by George Ernest Shelley in 1891 were barbets from Negros and Cebu islands in the collection of the British Museum. Megalaima haemacephala delica proposed by Carl Parrot in 1910 were four barbets from Deli and Sumatra in the Bavarian State Collection of Zoology. Megalaima haemacephala mindanensis proposed by Austin L. Rand in 1948 was a coppersmith barbet from Mount Apo in Mindanao. Megalaema haemacephala celestinoi proposed by Ernest Thomas Gilliard in 1949 was a coppersmith barbet from Samar island of the Philippines. Megalaema haemacephala cebuensis and Megalaema haemacephala homochroa proposed by Victoria Dziadosz and Kenneth Parkes in 1984 were coppersmith barbets from Toledo, Cebu and Tablas Island, respectively.

Molecular phylogenetic research of barbets revealed that Megalaima species form a clade, which also includes the fire-tufted barbet, the only species placed in the genus Psilopogon at the time. Asian barbets were therefore reclassified under Psilopogon, which is the older scientific name. The coppersmith barbet is one of the oldest Asian barbets in terms of genetic divergence and speciation. Nine coppersmith barbet subspecies are recognized as of 2014:

- the nominate subspecies P. h. haemacephalus occurs in Luzon and Mindoro
- P. h. indicus ranges from northeastern Pakistan to Sri Lanka, China, Vietnam and Singapore
- P. h. roseus occurs in Java and Bali
- P. h. intermedia occurs in Panay, Guimaras and Negros
- P. h. delicus occurs in Sumatra
- P. h. mindanensis occurs in Mindanao
- P. h. celestinoi occurs in Samar, Catanduanes, Biliran, and Leyte
- P. h. cebuensis occurs in Cebu
- P. h. homochroa occurs in Tablas Island

== Distribution and habitat ==
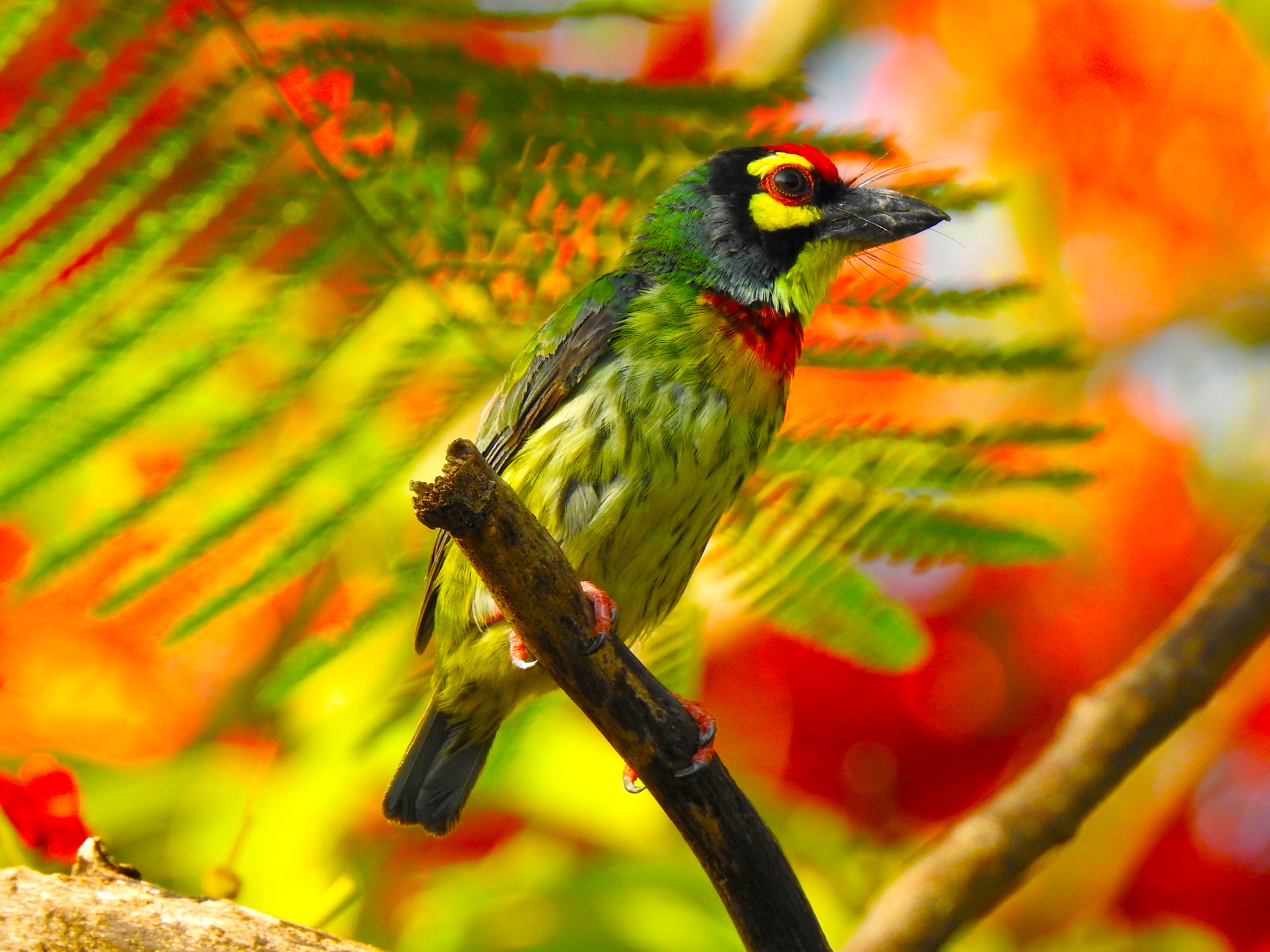
Coppersmith barbet in Queen Sirikit Park

Throughout its range, it inhabits gardens, groves and sparse woodland. Habitats with dead wood suitable for excavation of nests are important.

In the Palni Hills it occurs below 1,200 m (4,000 ft). In northern India, it occurs in the valleys of the outer Himalayas up to 910 m (3,000 ft). It is rare in northwestern Indian states and in wet forests in Assam.

The coppersmith barbet's range overlaps with several larger barbets in most of South Asia. In the Western Ghats, its range partly overlaps with the Malabar barbet.

== Behaviour and ecology ==
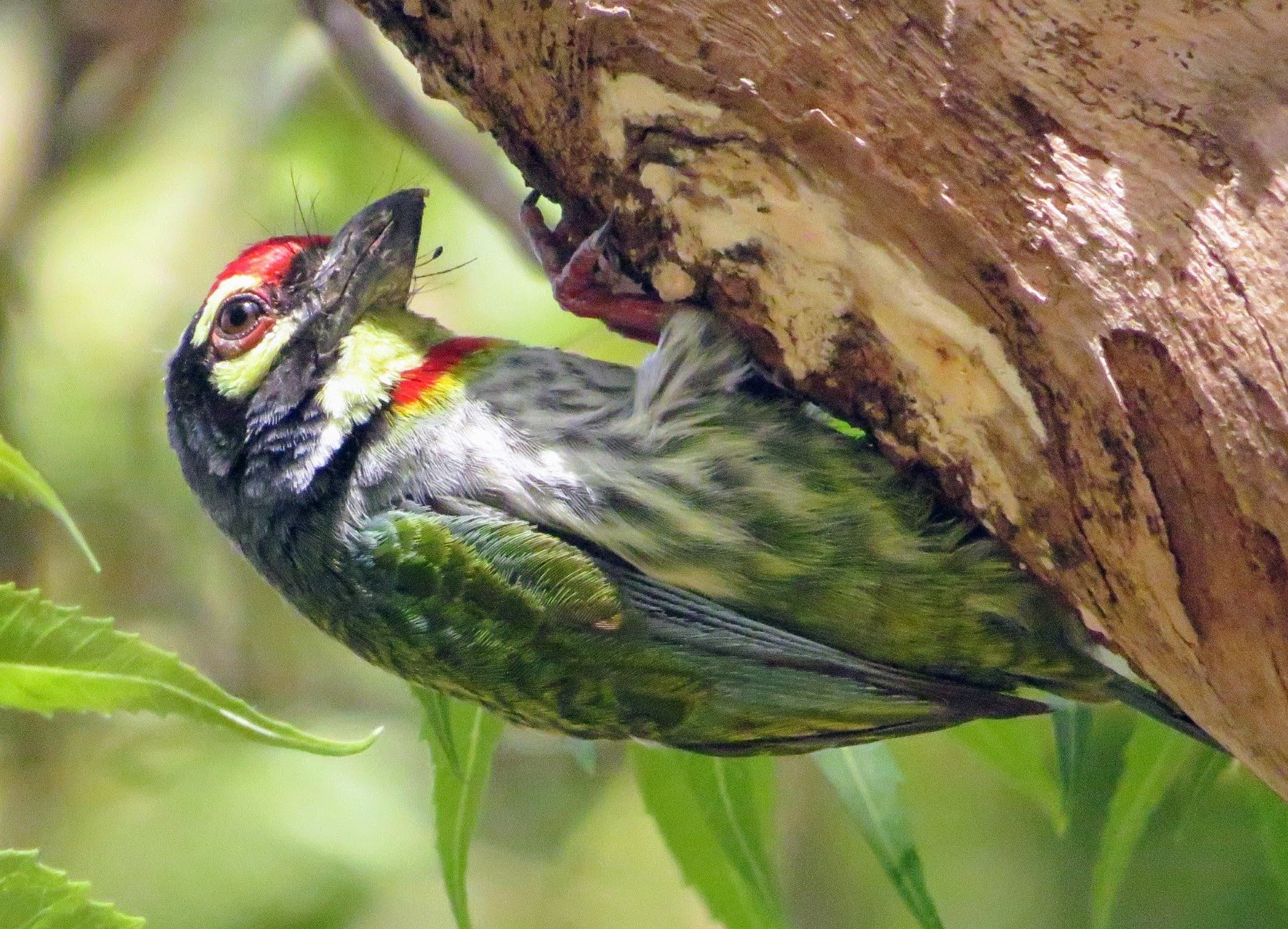
Coppersmith barbet at Gujarat refinery township Vadodara

The coppersmith barbet lives solitary or in small groups; larger parties have occasionally been sighted in abundantly fruiting Ficus trees. It appears to be fond of sunning in the morning on bare top branches of tall trees, often flitting about to sit next to each other. Its flight is straight, with rapid flaps.

It competes with other cavity nesting birds and frugivores. Blue-throated barbets have been seen evicting coppersmith barbets from their nest holes, while red-vented bulbuls have been seen to indulge in kleptoparasitism, robbing the male of berries brought to the female at the nest.

The nest holes are also used for roosting and some birds roost alone in cavities and these often roost during part of the day. Immatures will roost with the parents but often return to roost early so as not to be prevented by the parents from entering the roost cavity.

=== Vocalisation ===
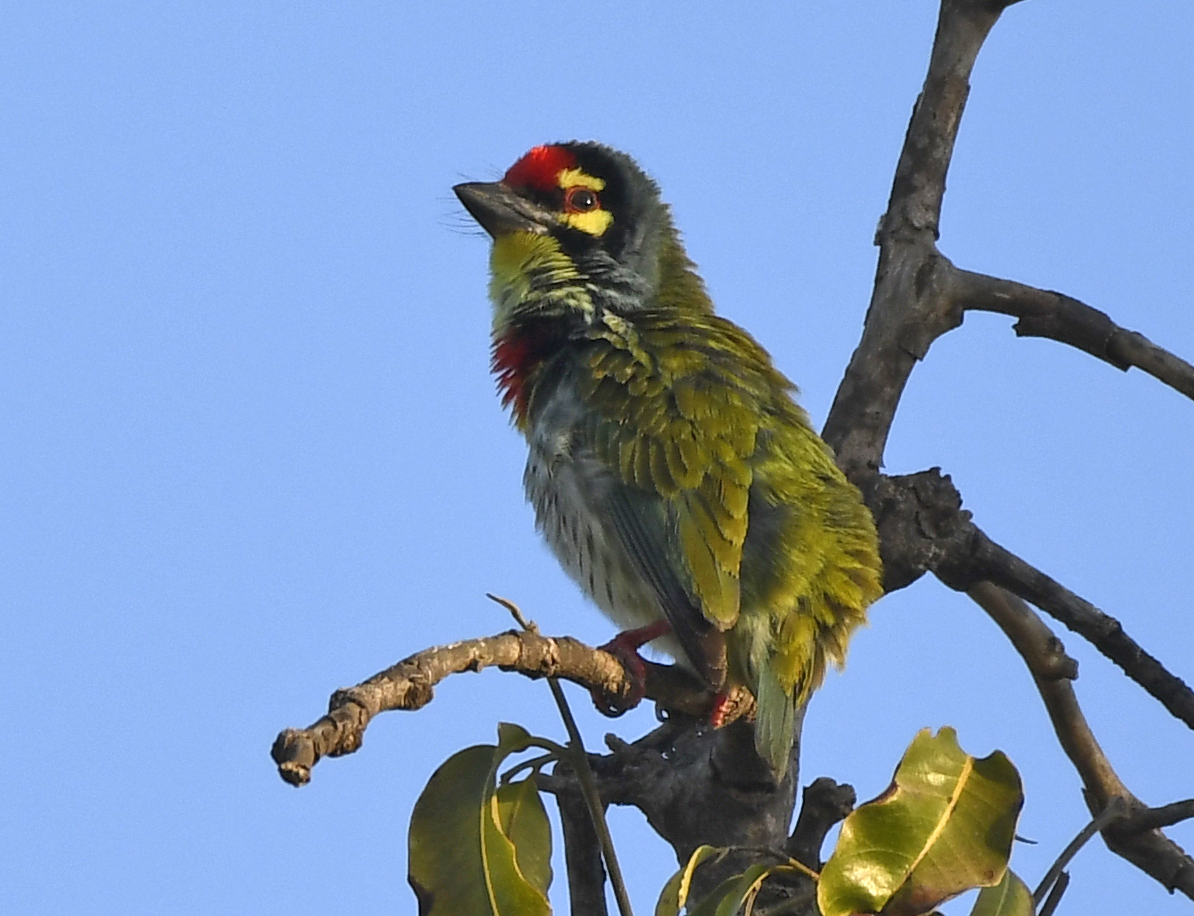
Coppersmith barbet in Delhi

A cebu subspecies of Coppersmith Barbet (P. h. cebuensis), July 2026

The call is a loud rather metallic tuk…tuk…tuk (or tunk), reminiscent of a copper sheet being beaten, giving the bird its name. Repeated monotonously for long periods, starting with a subdued tuk and building up to an even volume and tempo, the latter varying from 108 to 121 per minute and can continue with as many as 204 notes. They are silent and do not call in winter.

The beak remains shut during each call - a patch of bare skin on both sides of the throat inflates and collapses with each tuk like a rubber bulb and the head is bobbed.

=== Diet ===
The coppersmith barbet prefers banyan, peepul, and other wild figs, various drupes and berries, and the occasional insect, caught in aerial sallies. It also feeds on flower petals. It eats nearly 1.5 to nearly 3 times its own body weight in berries each day.

=== Breeding ===
Courtship involves singing, puffing of the throat, bobbing of the head, flicking of the tail, ritual feeding and allopreening. Birds nest and roost in cavities.

It breeds through much of the year with local variation. The breeding season is mainly February to April in India and December to September in Sri Lanka. Both sexes excavate the nest on the underside of a narrow horizontal branch. They also roost inside the nest holes. The female lays three or four eggs. Both sexes incubate. The Incubation period is not well known, but has been estimated to be about two weeks. Often two broods are raised in quick succession.

=== Mortality factors ===
Adult birds are sometimes taken by predatory species. In urban areas, there are records of collisions with structures including white walls. Pesticide poisoning has also been noted.
