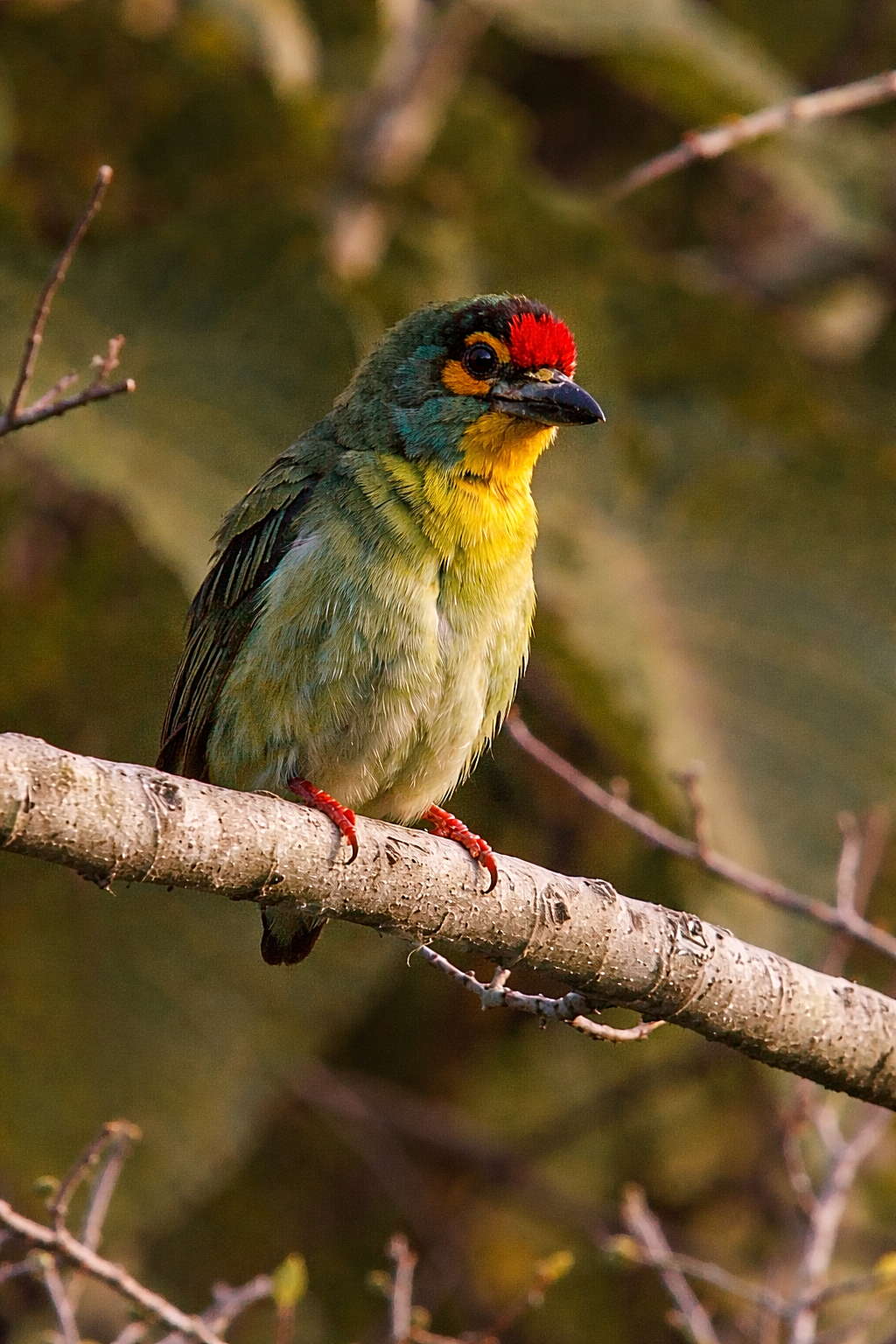
- from Knuckles, Sri Lanka

Conservation status
- Least Concern (IUCN 3.1)

Scientific classification
- Kingdom: Animalia
- Phylum: Chordata
- Class: Aves
- Order: Piciformes
- Family: Megalaimidae
- Genus: Psilopogon
- Species: P. rubricapillus

Binomial name
- Psilopogon rubricapillus (Gmelin, JF, 1788)
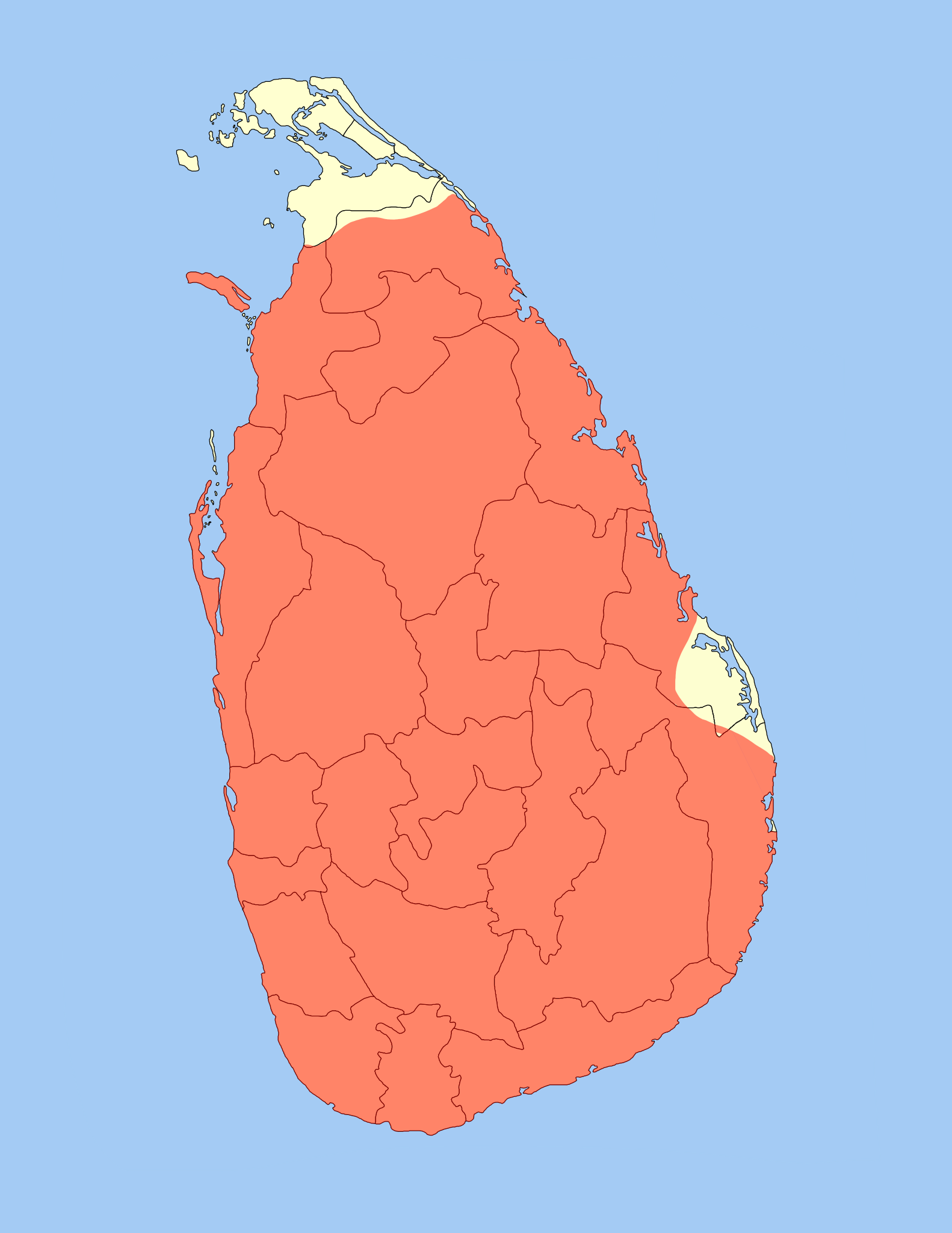

Synonyms
- Megalaima rubricapilla

= Crimson-fronted barbet =

Species of bird

The crimson-fronted barbet (Psilopogon rubricapillus), also called Sri Lanka barbet, is an Asian barbet endemic to Sri Lanka where it inhabits tropical moist lowland forests up to 1,300 m (4,300 ft) elevation.

== Taxonomy ==
The crimson-fronted barbet was formally described in 1788 by the German naturalist Johann Friedrich Gmelin in his revised and expanded edition of Carl Linnaeus's Systema Naturae. He placed it with the puffbirds in the genus Bucco and coined the binomial name Bucco rubricapillus. The specific epithet combines the Latin ruber meaning "red" with -caillus meaning "-capped" or "-crowned". Gmelin based his description on the "red-crowned barbet" that had been described and illustrated in 1776 by the English illustrator and naturalist Peter Brown. The crimson-fronted barbet is now one of 33 species placed in the genus Psilopogon that was introduced in 1836 by Salomon Müller. The species is monotypic: no subspecies are recognised.

== Description ==
The crimson-fronted barbet has a mainly green plumage and wings, a blue band down the side of the head and neck, and a black crescent behind the eye. It is 15 cm (5.9 in) long with a short neck, large head and short tail. Its forages for fruit and insects, and nests in tree holes, laying 2-4 eggs.
