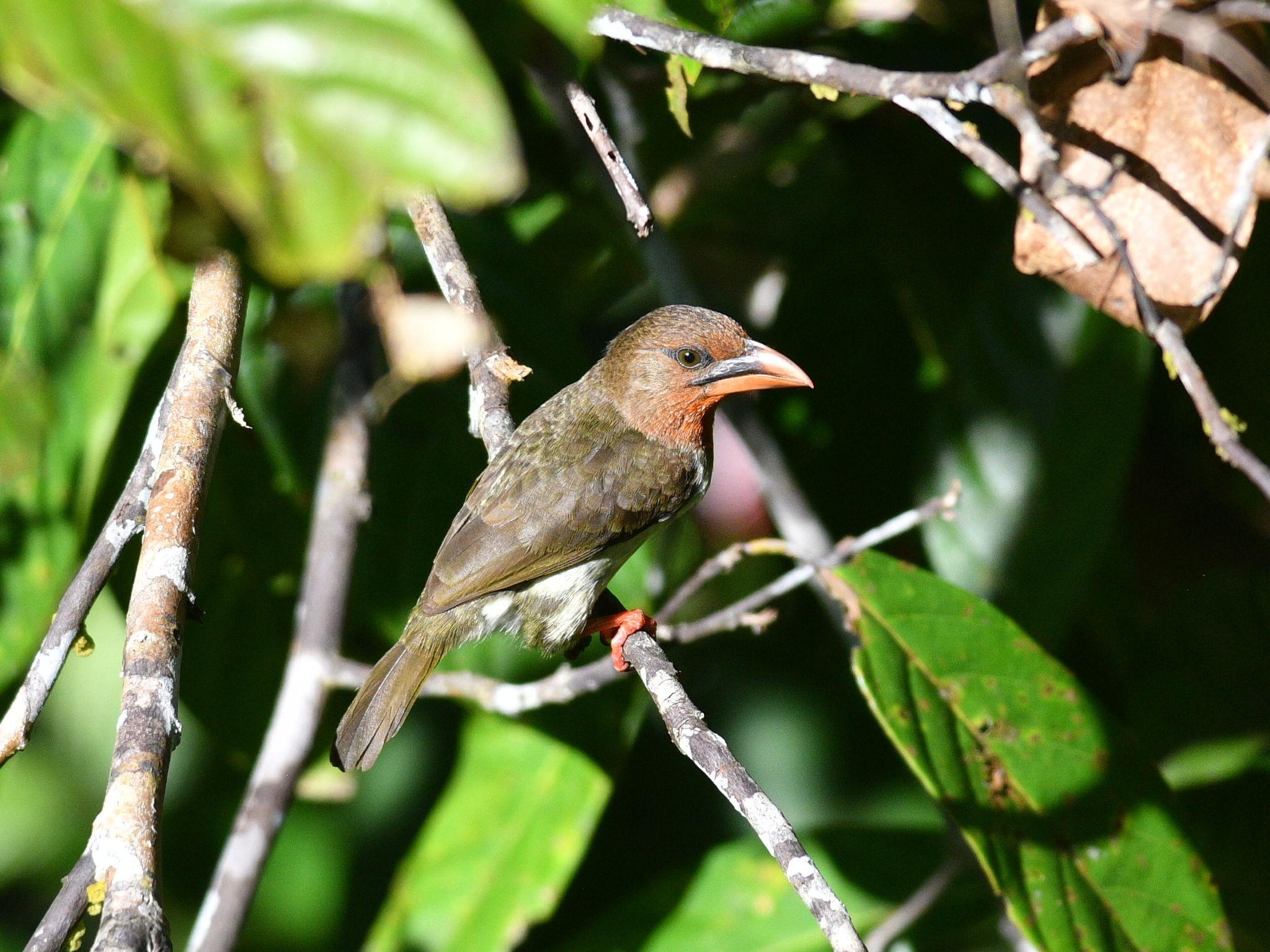

Conservation status
- Least Concern (IUCN 3.1)

Scientific classification
- Kingdom: Animalia
- Phylum: Chordata
- Class: Aves
- Order: Piciformes
- Family: Megalaimidae
- Genus: Caloramphus
- Species: C. fuliginosus

Binomial name
- Caloramphus fuliginosus (Temminck, 1830)

= Bornean brown barbet =

Species of bird

The Bornean brown barbet or brown barbet (Caloramphus fuliginosus) is a species of bird in the family Megalaimidae. It is found in Borneo. Its natural habitat is subtropical or tropical moist lowland forests. It is threatened by habitat loss, and has lost approximately half of its connected habitat since 1973.

The sooty barbet was considered conspecific.
