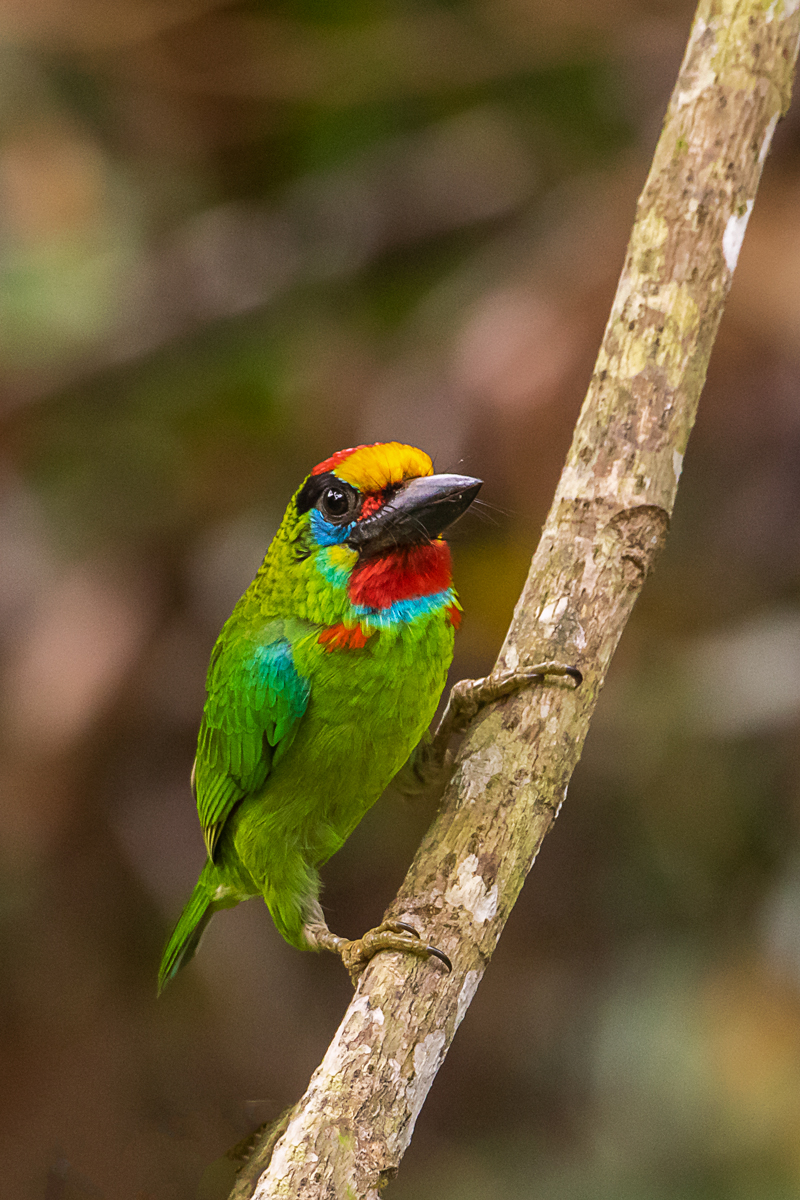
- Red-throated barbet in Taiping, Malaysia

Conservation status
- Near Threatened (IUCN 3.1)

Scientific classification
- Kingdom: Animalia
- Phylum: Chordata
- Class: Aves
- Order: Piciformes
- Family: Megalaimidae
- Genus: Psilopogon
- Species: P. mystacophanos

Binomial name
- Psilopogon mystacophanos (Temminck, 1824)

Synonyms
- Megalaima mystacophanos

= Red-throated barbet =

Species of bird

The red-throated barbet (Psilopogon mystacophanos) is a species of bird in the family Megalaimidae. It is found in Brunei, Indonesia, Malaysia, Myanmar, and Thailand. Its natural habitats are subtropical or tropical moist lowland forest and subtropical or tropical swamps. It is threatened by habitat loss.

== Description ==
The red-throated barbet male is mainly green with a red crown, throat, and spot below the throat, as well as a black spot above each eye and a yellow crown patch. Males also have some blue near the eyes and on the lower part of the throat. The female lacks most of the male's facial coloration, but is otherwise similar. Juveniles resemble females. Adults measure 23 cm (9.1 in) in length and weigh 60–95 g (2.1–3.4 oz).
