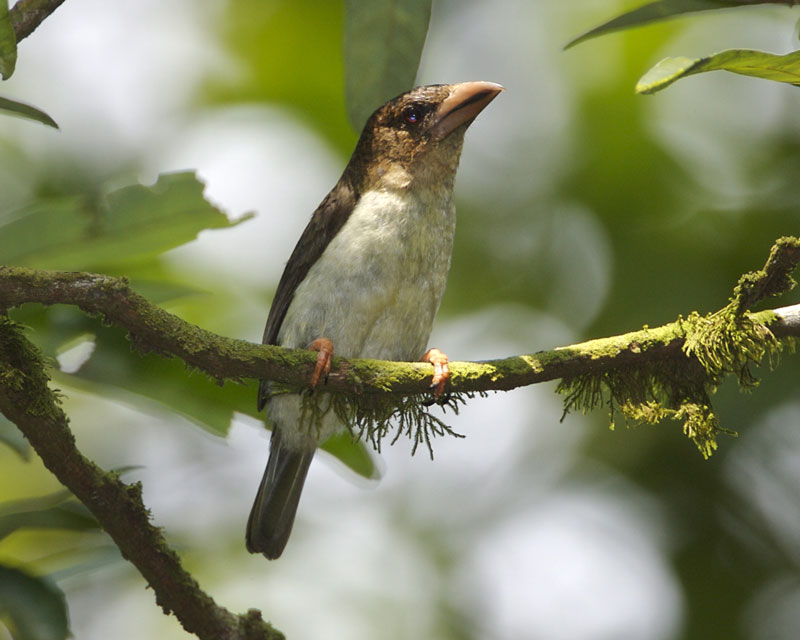
- Brown barbet

Scientific classification
- Kingdom: Animalia
- Phylum: Chordata
- Class: Aves
- Order: Piciformes
- Family: Megalaimidae
- Genus: Caloramphus; Lesson, 1839

Species
- 2, see text

= Caloramphus =

Genus of birds

Caloramphus is a genus of Asian barbets in the family Megalaimidae.

== Species ==
Genus Caloramphus – Lesson, 1839 – two species
Common name	Scientific name and subspecies	Range	Size and ecology	IUCN status and estimated population
Bornean brown barbet	Caloramphus fuliginosus (Temminck, 1830)	Borneo	Size: Habitat: Diet:	LC
Malayan brown barbet	Caloramphus hayii (Gray, JE, 1831)	Malaysia, Myanmar, Thailand, Sumatra	Size: Habitat: Diet:	LC
