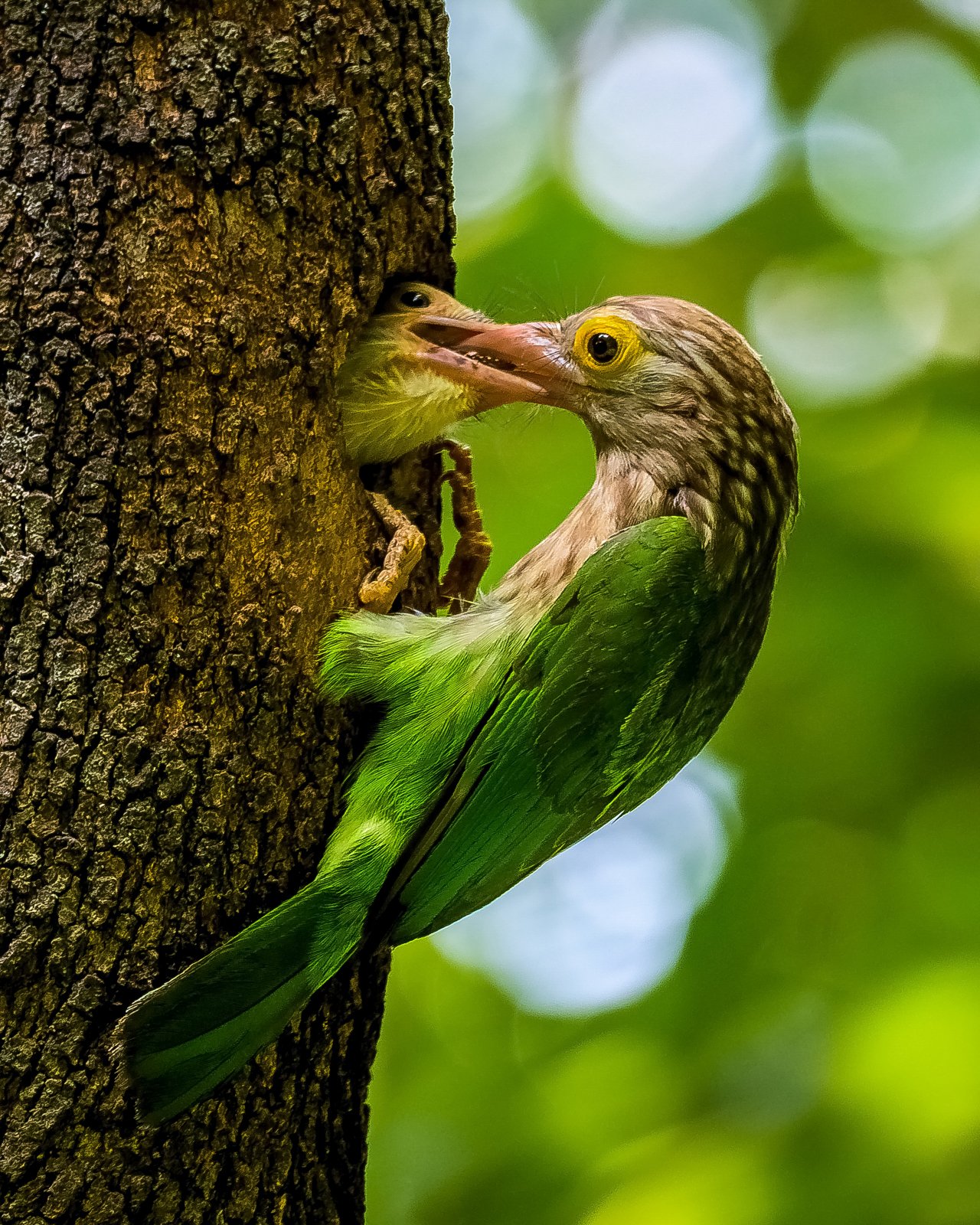
- on a fig tree (Ficus racemosa)

Conservation status
- Least Concern (IUCN 3.1)

Scientific classification
- Kingdom: Animalia
- Phylum: Chordata
- Class: Aves
- Order: Piciformes
- Family: Megalaimidae
- Genus: Psilopogon
- Species: P. lineatus

Binomial name
- Psilopogon lineatus (Vieillot, 1816)

Synonyms
- Megalaima lineata

= Lineated barbet =

Species of bird

The lineated barbet (Psilopogon lineatus) is an Asian barbet native to the Terai, the Brahmaputra basin to Southeast Asia. It is a frugivore and nests in holes of tree trunks.
