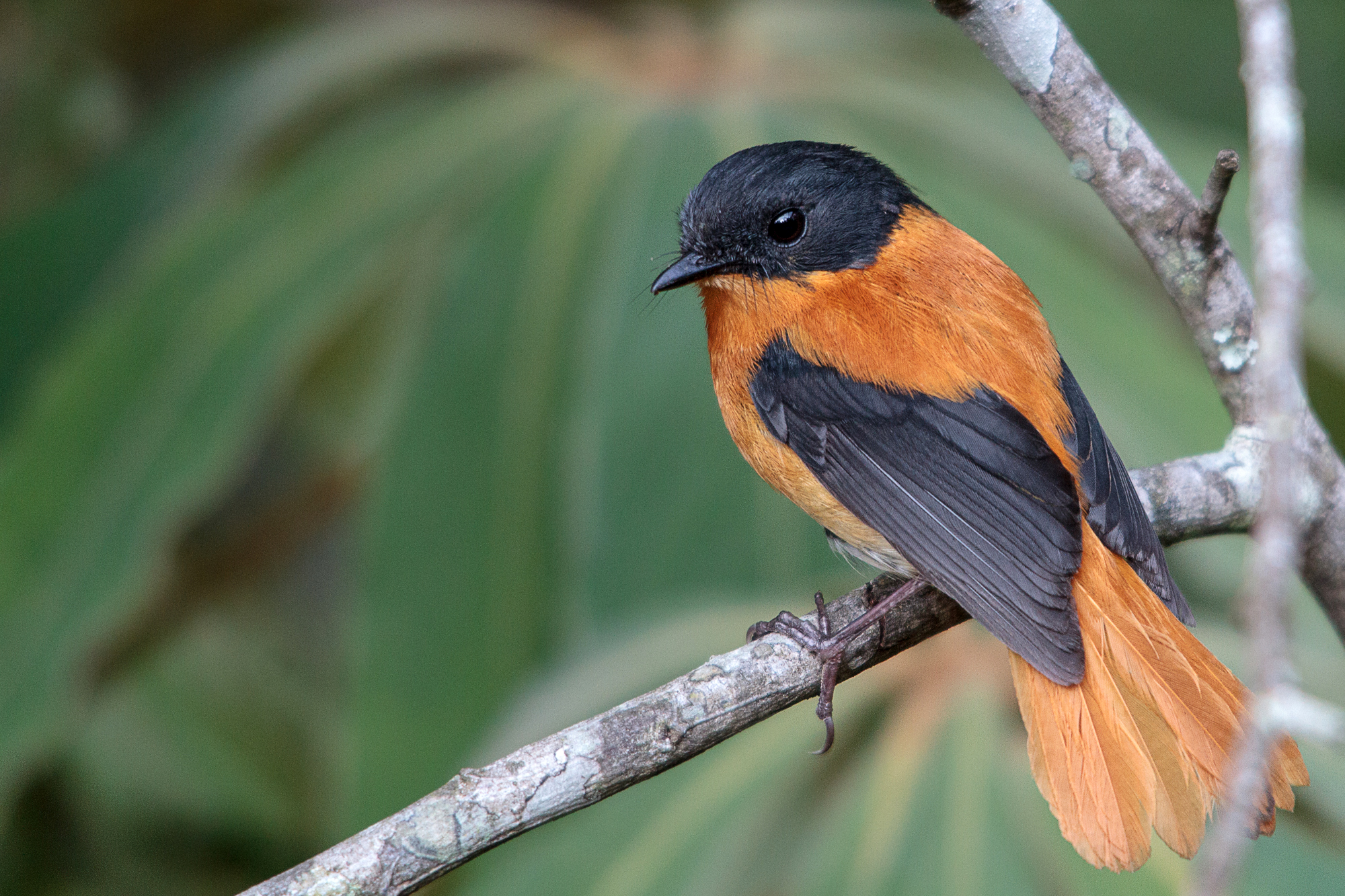

Conservation status
- Least Concern (IUCN 3.1)

Scientific classification
- Kingdom: Animalia
- Phylum: Chordata
- Class: Aves
- Order: Passeriformes
- Family: Muscicapidae
- Genus: Ficedula
- Species: F. nigrorufa

Binomial name
- Ficedula nigrorufa (Jerdon, 1839)
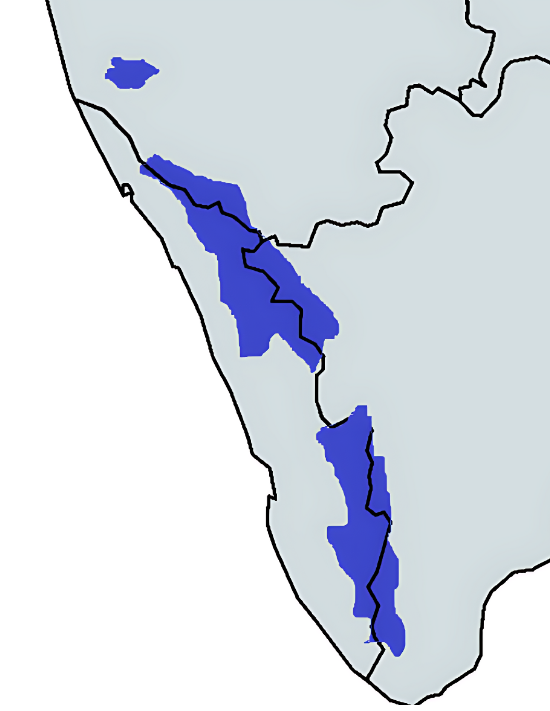

Synonyms
- Ochromela nigrorufa Muscicapa nigrorufa

Audio
- Calls

= Black-and-orange flycatcher =

Species of bird

The black-and-orange flycatcher (Ficedula nigrorufa) or black-and-rufous flycatcher is a species of flycatcher endemic to the central and southern Western Ghats, the Nilgiris and Palni hill ranges in southern India. It is unique among the Ficedula flycatchers in having rufous coloration on its back and prior to molecular studies was suggested to be related to the chats and thrushes.

== Description ==
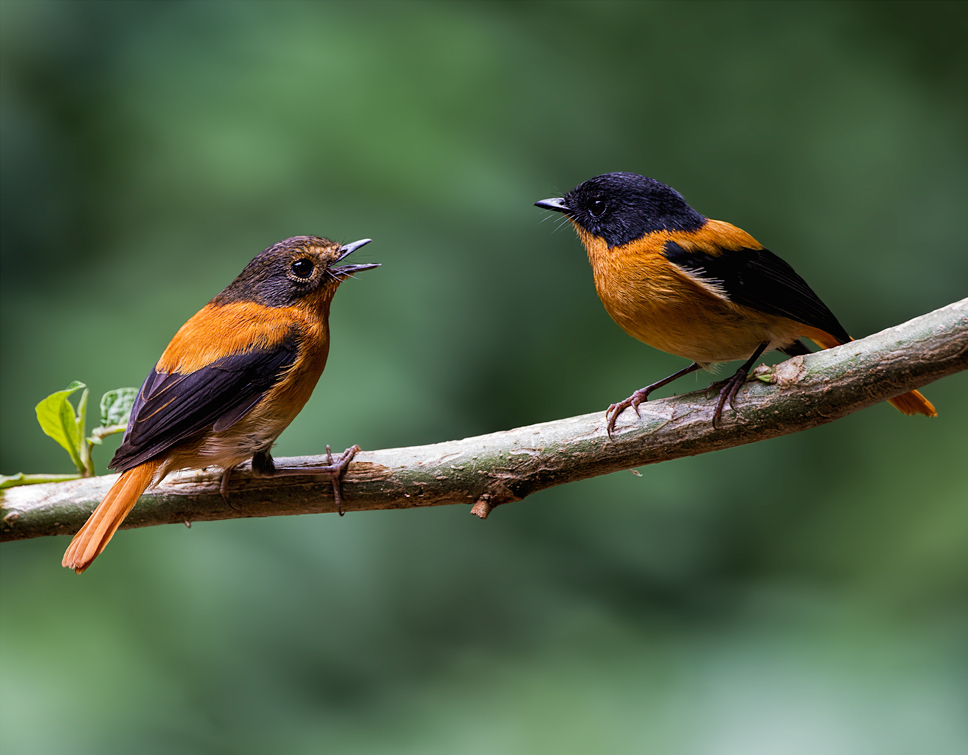
A pair, female left and male right

A distinctly coloured bird found mainly in the high-elevation areas of the Western Ghats, the Nilgiris, the Palnis and associated hill ranges. The male is distinctly black headed with black wings. The female has the black replaced by dark brown and has a light eye-ring. They are usually seen singly or in pairs.

The young bird at around two weeks of age is brownish orange with a whitish vent and abdomen. The head has dark streaks and the wings appear bluish with a trace of brown. There is a pale ring around the eye and the orange tail appears stumpy. Eight weeks after fledging they appear almost like adults except for patches of brown feathers in the crown.

== Distribution and habitat ==
The main population of this bird is found in the high elevation plateaus above 1,500 m (4,900 ft) areas of the Nilgiris, Palani Hills, Biligiriranga Hills (Bellaji and Honnametti), and Kannan Devan Hills. They prefer areas with high leaf litter and undergrowth in open shola grassland habitats. The density was about 2.8 ha (6.9 acres) per pair during the breeding season. It is a highly parochial bird and no local movements other than dispersal of young has been noted. To the north, it occurs in the Kudremukh National Park and the Bababudan Hills and south to the Ashambu Hills. Some old records of the species from Maharashtra and Sri Lanka have been considered dubious.

== Behaviour and ecology ==
- - - - Ficedula hodgsonii
      - - Ficedula sapphira
        - Ficedula erithacus
    - - Ficedula nigrorufa
      - Ficedula tricolor

Nearest relatives based on Outlaw & Voelker (2006)

In the breeding season, March to May, these birds are very vocal and they have a repetitive "chee-ri-rirr" or a whistling song "whee-chee-ree-rirr". They feed on insects by flycatching low over the ground (under 2m height) and also pick insects from the ground. Territories are maintained by a pair throughout the year. The threat display involves the male pointing bill up, fanning the tail, opening wings and producing "keet-keet" notes. The alarm call is a zit-zit. Males are usually involved in defense but females may sometimes join in. The nest is built by the female, placed in a low bush or fern. Two greyish speckled eggs form the usual clutch. Young birds are brownish and speckled. The nest is unlike that of most flycatchers and is large, coarse, ball-like and made from sedges. The nest has a foundation of dry leaves and ferns. The nest has an external diameter of about 6 inches (15 cm) and the egg cavity which is devoid of any lining is about 2 inches (5.1 cm) in diameter and 2 inches (5.1 cm) deep. The nest is placed usually at the centre of a bush at about 1 to 3 feet (0.30 to 0.91 m) height with an entrance hole close to the top.

The peak feeding activity of the birds is early in the morning and towards dusk. During these period they capture as many as 100 insects an hour whereas at mid-day they are half as efficient.

The black-and-orange flycatcher along with the rufous-chested flycatcher (Ficedula dumetoria) are the only sedentary species within the genus Ficedula and lack the longer and more pointed wing morphology of the long distant migrant members.
