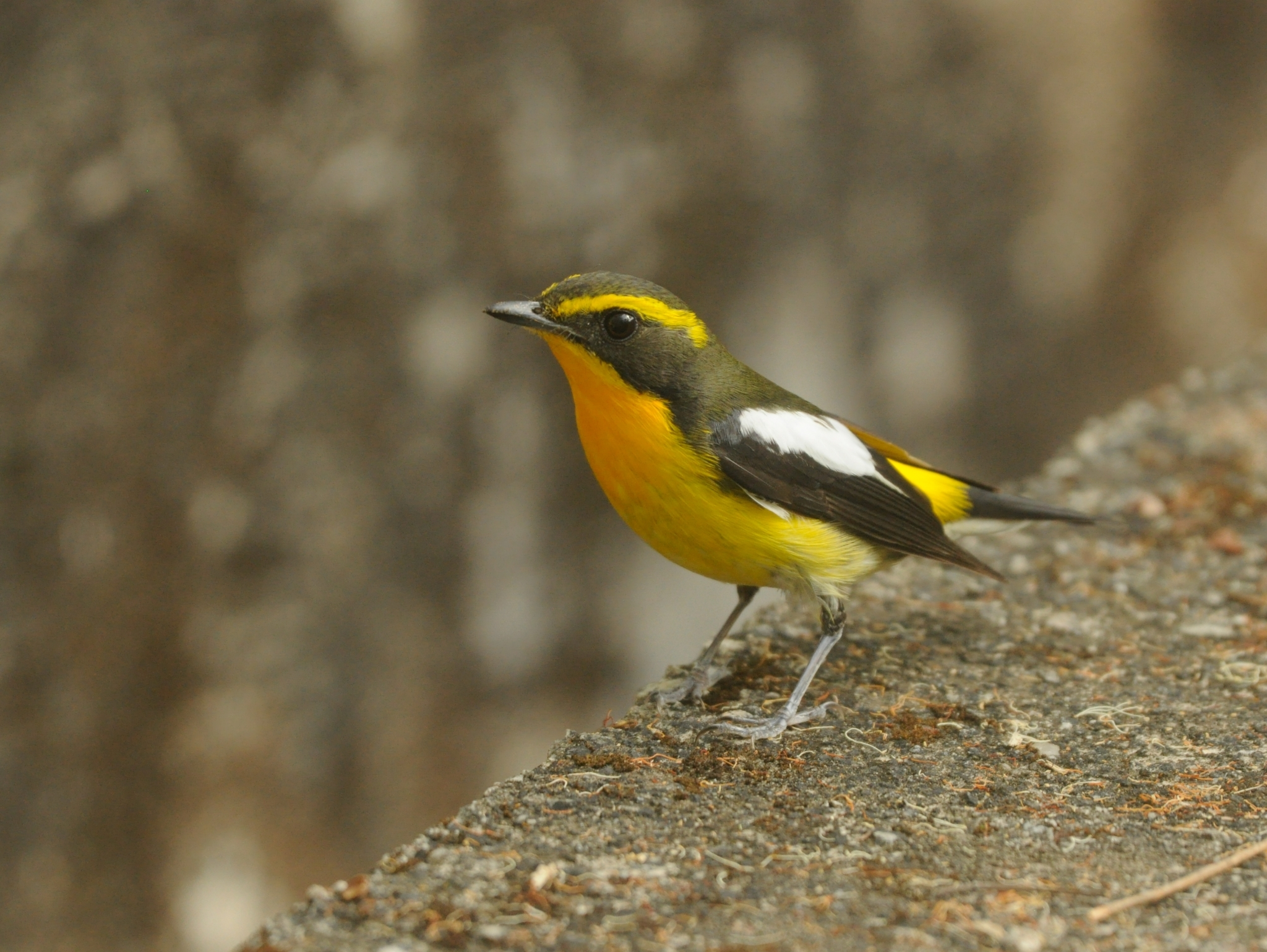

Conservation status
- Least Concern (IUCN 3.1)

Scientific classification
- Kingdom: Animalia
- Phylum: Chordata
- Class: Aves
- Order: Passeriformes
- Family: Muscicapidae
- Genus: Ficedula
- Species: F. owstoni

Binomial name
- Ficedula owstoni (Bangs, 1901)

= Ryukyu flycatcher =

Species of bird

The Ryukyu flycatcher (Ficedula owstoni) is a passerine bird in the Old World flycatcher family. It is native to the Ryukyu Islands, from Tanegashima in the Osumi Islands to Iriomote in the Yaeyama Islands.

== Description ==
The Ryukyu flycatcher weighs around 12 g (0.42 oz), with males typically being larger than females. The male is the more colourful sex too, with a yellow lower back and rump, yellow-orange underbelly, orange bib, and yellow-orange streaks above its eyes; all contrasted against bluish-black plumage.

Of its three subspecies, F. o. jakuschima is the biggest and most vibrant, F. o. shonis is intermediate, and F. o. owstini, the nominate subspecies, is the plainest in plumage and smallest in size.

== Behaviour ==
This species’ song is described by eBird as “a bright, whistled series of notes ‘wee-ti! Wee-dee-di, wee-ti!’” It consists of shorter and less complex phrases, compared to the song of the narcissus flycatcher, and is supposedly similar to that of the yellow-rumped flycatcher.

Its calls “include a dry chatter and a low ‘chuk’ note.”

== Taxonomy ==
The Ryukyu flycatcher has previously been considered conspecific with the narcissus flycatcher and the green-backed flycatcher, only recently being granted full-species status. However, some of the more northern-ranging populations are considered somewhat intermediate with the narcissus flycatcher. This revision was based on differences in shades of plumage and the Ryukyu flycatcher's songs, which are made up of shorter phrases and fall within a narrower frequency range.

The Ryukyu flycatcher is divided into three subspecies: Ficedula owstoni jakuschima from the northern Ryukyu Islands, Ficedula owstoni shonis from the central Ryukyus, and Ficedula owstoni owstoni from the southern Ryukyus.

== Conservation ==
Not much is known about this species but it's not considered to be threatened. It was known to once be common across the northern regions of the Ryukyu Islands down to Okinawa, but is today considered rare. More fieldwork needs to be done to determine the security of this species.
