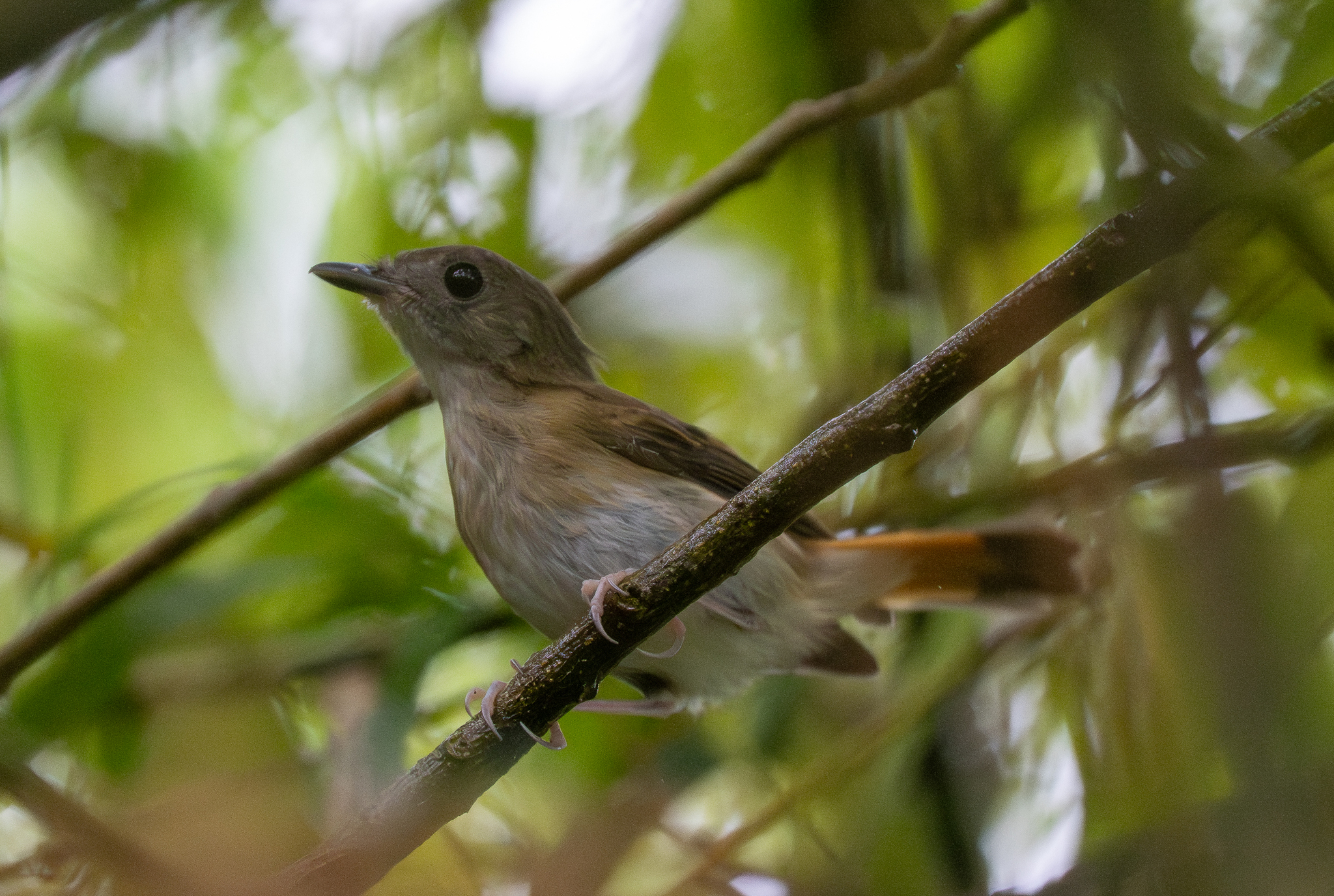

Conservation status
- Least Concern (IUCN 3.1)

Scientific classification
- Kingdom: Animalia
- Phylum: Chordata
- Class: Aves
- Order: Passeriformes
- Family: Muscicapidae
- Genus: Ficedula
- Species: F. disposita

Binomial name
- Ficedula disposita (Ripley & Marshall, 1967)

= Furtive flycatcher =

Species of bird

The furtive flycatcher (Ficedula disposita) is a species of bird in the family Muscicapidae. It is endemic to the island of Luzon in the Philippines.

Its natural habitats are tropical moist lowland forests and tropical moist montane forests.

== Description and taxonomy ==
This is a small bird found in the lowland forests of Luzon where it is typically associated with dense bamboo growths. It is dark brown with a gray chest, has a white throat and belly and a tail that is primarily orange but a dark brown tip..

Its song is described as a descending three note whistle. It also has a faint but sharp whistling call.

This species is monotypic.

Up until 1991, it was only known from a single female specimen. Due to a lack of specimens, it was formerly conspecific with the Cryptic flycatcher and the Lompobattang flycatcher, but is significantly different in plummage.

== Ecology and behavior ==
It is a secretive bird usually found solitary or as a pair perched close to the forest floor often motionless for long periods. It is often found in bamboo groves and seems more tolerant of degraded secondary forest. Not much is known about its diet but it is believed to be an insectivore.

Birds found in breeding condition with enlarged gonads but otherwise nothing is known about its breeding habits, nest and fledgelings.

== Habitat and conservation status ==
Its natural habitat is tropical moist lowland forest. It was previously classified as near threatened by the IUCN due to continuing forest loss on Luzon. However, in 2024, this species was reassessed as least concern. This downlisting does not mean that this species is increasing but rather reflects new data that this species occurs in higher densities than originally believed. This species was discovered to be able to survive in secondary habitat.Its threats are mainly habitat loss due to deforestation for logging, mining and farmland. There are no known targeted conservation actions for this bird, but it will indirectly benefit from the conservation of other North Luzon species like the Critically Endangered Isabela oriole. The stronghold of the Isabela oriole in Baggao is being proposed as a protected area and will thus preserve key habitat.

It occurs in the Northern Sierra Madre Natural Park, Aurora Memorial National Park and Kalbario–Patapat Natural Park but enforcement from loggers and hunters is still lax.
