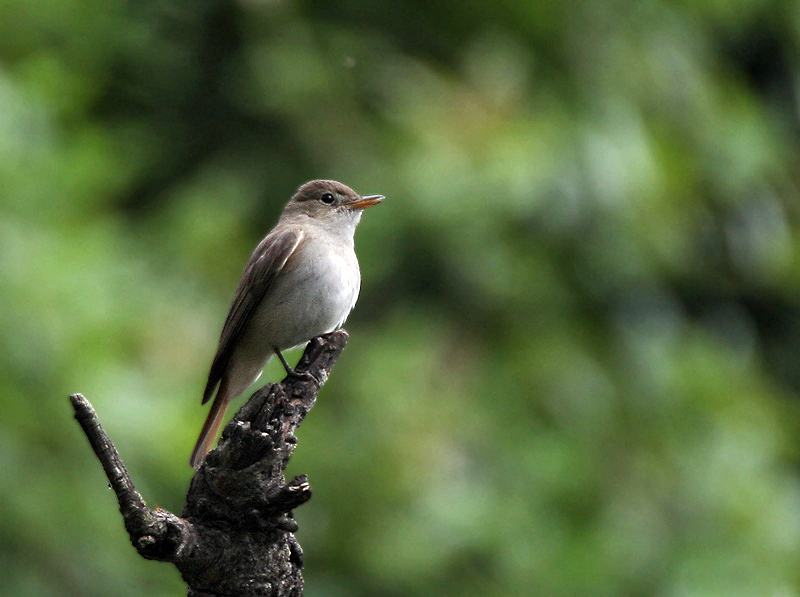
- in Kullu - Manali District of Himachal Pradesh, India.

Conservation status
- Least Concern (IUCN 3.1)

Scientific classification
- Kingdom: Animalia
- Phylum: Chordata
- Class: Aves
- Order: Passeriformes
- Family: Muscicapidae
- Genus: Ficedula
- Species: F. ruficauda

Binomial name
- Ficedula ruficauda (Swainson, 1838)

= Rusty-tailed flycatcher =

Species of bird

The rusty-tailed flycatcher (Ficedula ruficauda) is a small passerine bird in the flycatcher family Muscicapidae. It is found mainly in the northern regions of the Indian subcontinent and some parts of southwest India, as well as pockets of Central Asia including Uzbekistan and Tajikistan. The species is partially migratory, with the Central Asian populations migrating to India, as far as the southwest Indian coast along the Arabian Sea, to Karnataka and Kerala.

Other populations, especially those across the lower Himalayas, remain in their native regions year-round and breed there. The species is also an occasional vagrant to other areas in India.

The rusty-tailed flycatcher is 14 cm (5.5 in) in length and weighs 11–16 g (0.39–0.56 oz). The sexes have similar plumage.

In a molecular phylogenetic study of species in Muscicapa and related genera (tribe Muscicapini) published in 2016, Gary Voelker and colleagues found that the rusty-tailed flycatcher was basal to the other Muscicapini species and proposed that it be placed in its own monotypic genus Ripleyia. This name was found to be preoccupied and was replaced by Ripleyornis. A subsequent phylogenetic analysis that included species from both Ficedula and Muscicapa found that the rusty-tailed flycatcher formed part of a clade containing members of Ficedula.
