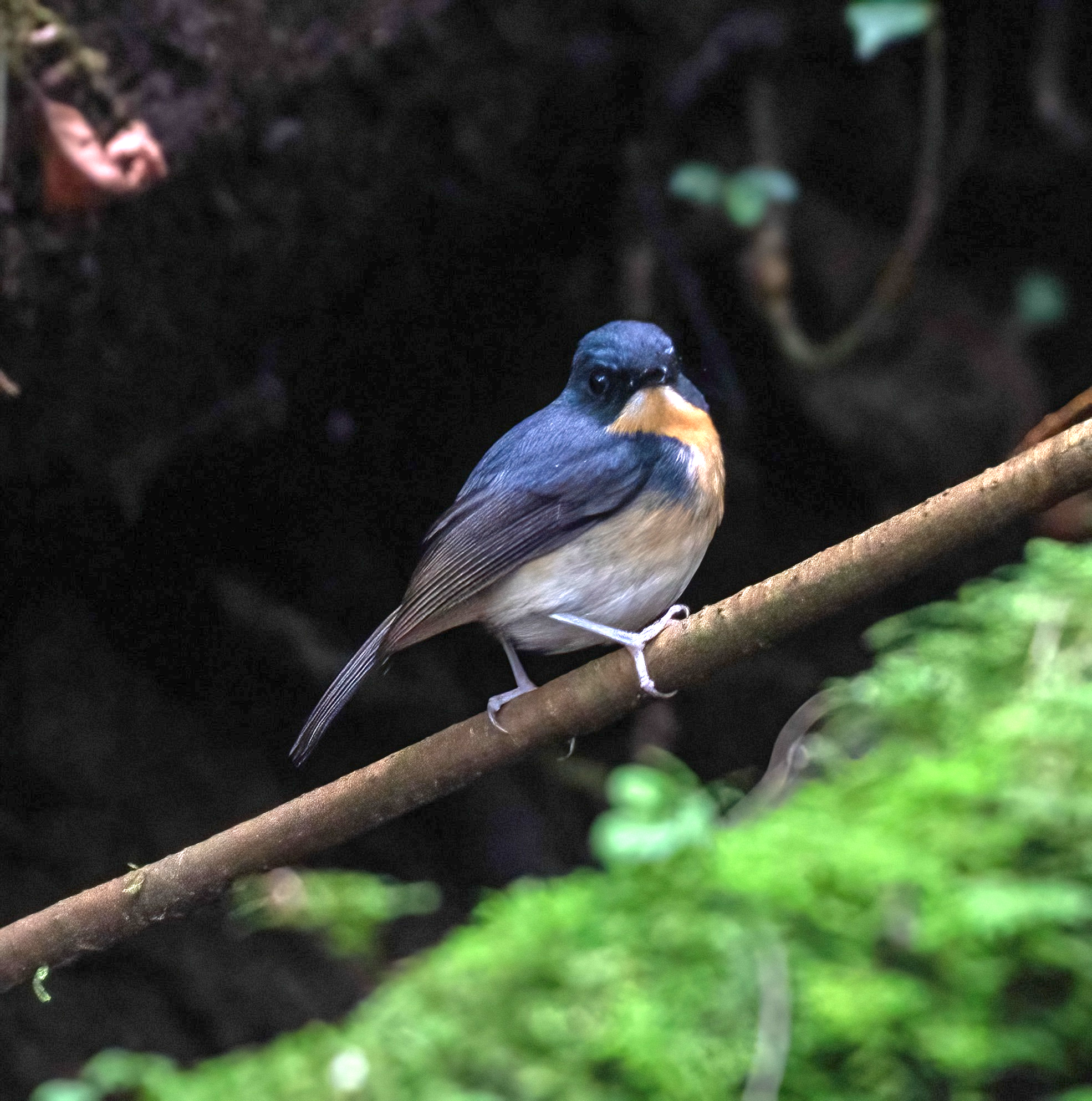
- A male ssp. luzoniensis
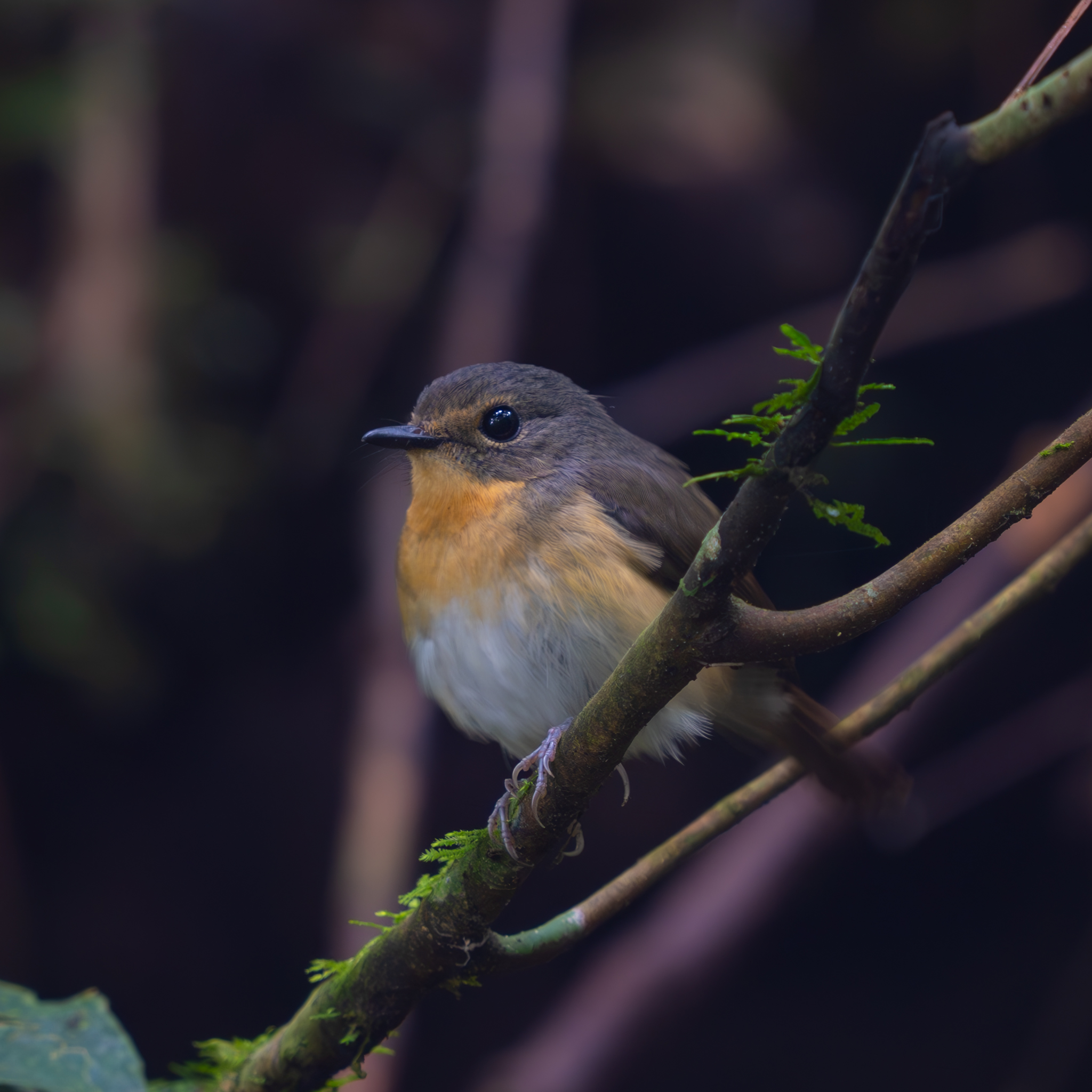
- A female ssp. luzoniensis

Conservation status
- Least Concern (IUCN 3.1)

Scientific classification
- Kingdom: Animalia
- Phylum: Chordata
- Class: Aves
- Order: Passeriformes
- Family: Muscicapidae
- Genus: Ficedula
- Species: F. luzoniensis

Binomial name
- Ficedula luzoniensis (Ogilvie-Grant, 1894)

= Bundok flycatcher =

Species of bird

The Bundok flycatcher (Ficedula luzoniensis) or thicket flycatcher, is a species of bird in the family Muscicapidae. It is endemic to the Philippines found in tropical montane forest.

== Description and taxonomy ==
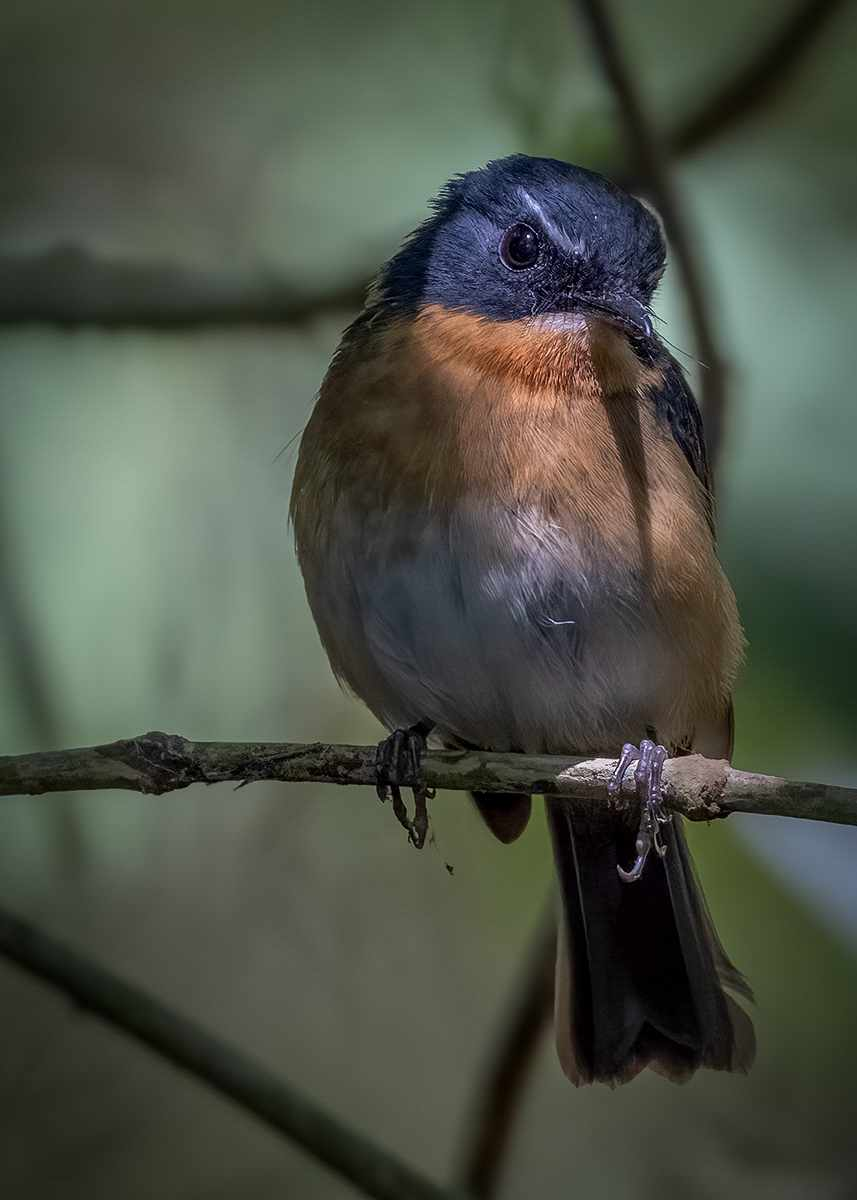

=== Subspecies ===
Eight subspecies are recognized:

- F. l. luzoniensis — Luzon and Mindoro
- F. l. calayensis — Calayan Island
- F. l. rara — Palawan
- F. l. nigrorum — Panay and Negros
- F. l. daggayana — Misamis Oriental
- F. l. montigena — Mount Kitanglad and Mount Apo
- F. l. malindangensis — Mount Malindang
- F. l. matutumensis — Mount Matutum

== Ecology and behavior ==
Feeds on mostly on small insects but also some fruit. Found singly most of the time but seen in pairs during the breeding season. This species silently forages low in clearings and forest edges - it is often seen on the ground while also hawking for insects. Birds in breeding condition with enlarged gonads collected from January to June. Young birds have been observed in May to June. No other information regarding its breeding habits.

== Habitat and conservation status ==
Its natural habitats at tropical montane forests typically above 1,000 meters above sea level. The supposed subspecies calayensis is virtually unknown and an exception to this as Calayan Island's highest point is just less than 500 meters above sea level.

The IUCN Red List has assessed this bird as least-concern species as it is still common across its range. However, the population is believed to be declining due to the deforestation happening throughout the Philippines.
