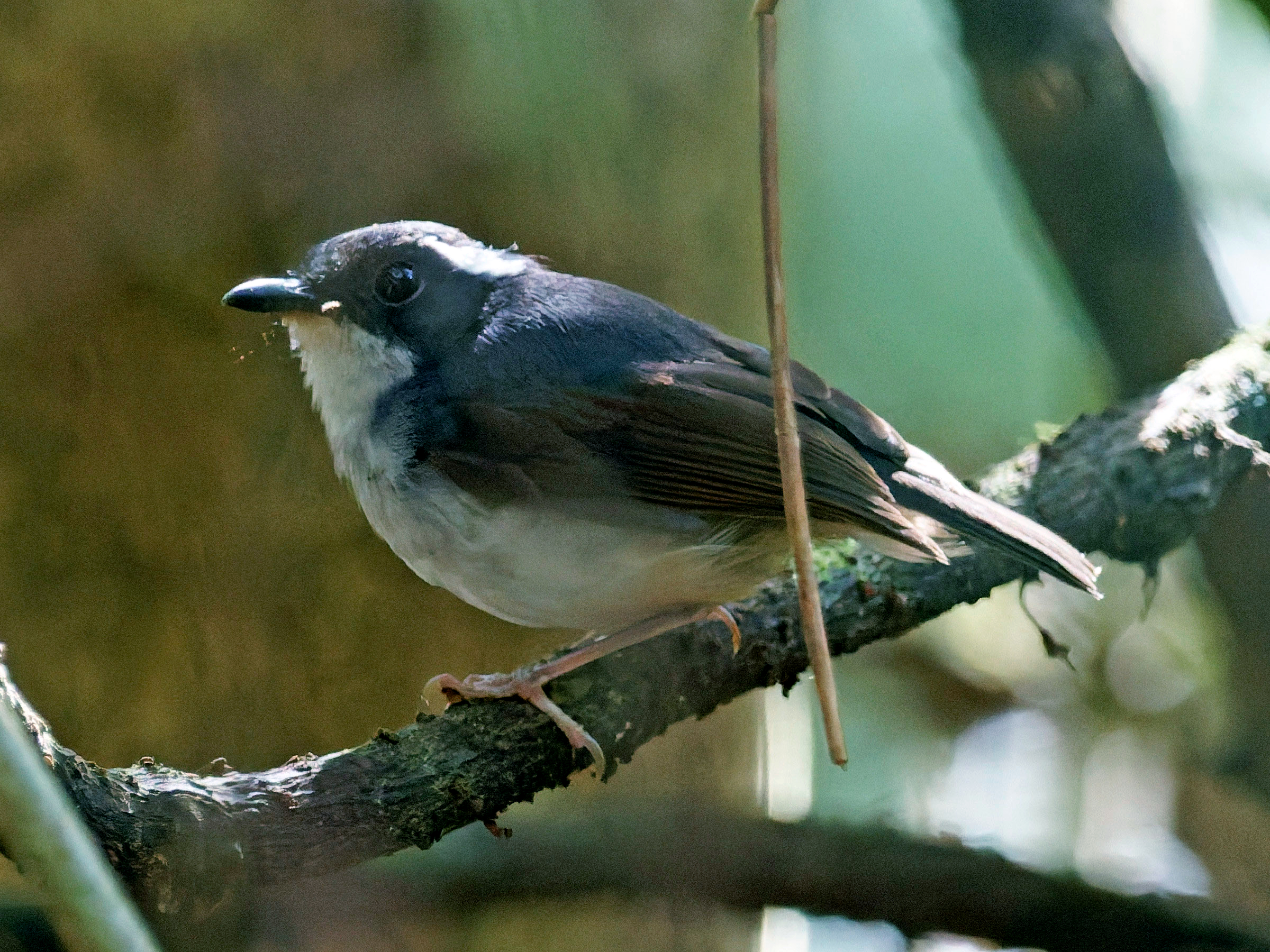
- Male F. b. samarensis
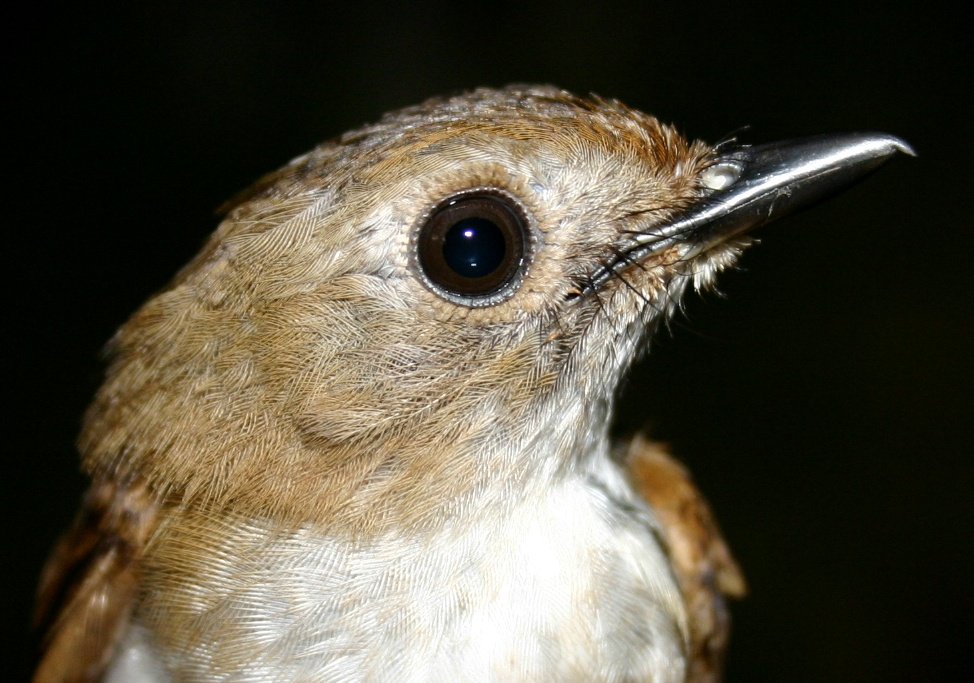
- Female F. b. basilanica

Conservation status
- Vulnerable (IUCN 3.1)

Scientific classification
- Kingdom: Animalia
- Phylum: Chordata
- Class: Aves
- Order: Passeriformes
- Family: Muscicapidae
- Genus: Ficedula
- Species: F. basilanica

Binomial name
- Ficedula basilanica (Sharpe, 1877)

= Little slaty flycatcher =

Species of bird

The little slaty flycatcher (Ficedula basilanica) is a species of bird in the family Muscicapidae. It is found on the islands of Mindanao, Leyte and Samar in the Philippines.

Its natural habitat is tropical moist lowland forests. It is threatened by habitat loss.

== Description and taxonomy ==
This is a small species of bird found in the dense undergrowth of the lowland forests of Greater Mindanao. They are sexually dimorphic in which males have the eponymous slaty-grey color on its upperparts and a pale white belly and a white stripe behind its eye while females have light brown upperparts and pale white underparts.

=== Subspecies ===
Two subspecies are recognized:

- F. b. basilanica - Found on Mindanao, Dinagat and Basilan. No recent records on Basilan and Dinagat Islands. Smaller ear patch, lighter head and a darker tail.
- F. b. samarensis - Found on Samar and Leyte. No recent records on Leyte. Has a much more prominent white ear patch, a darker head and a paler tail.

== Ecology and behavior ==
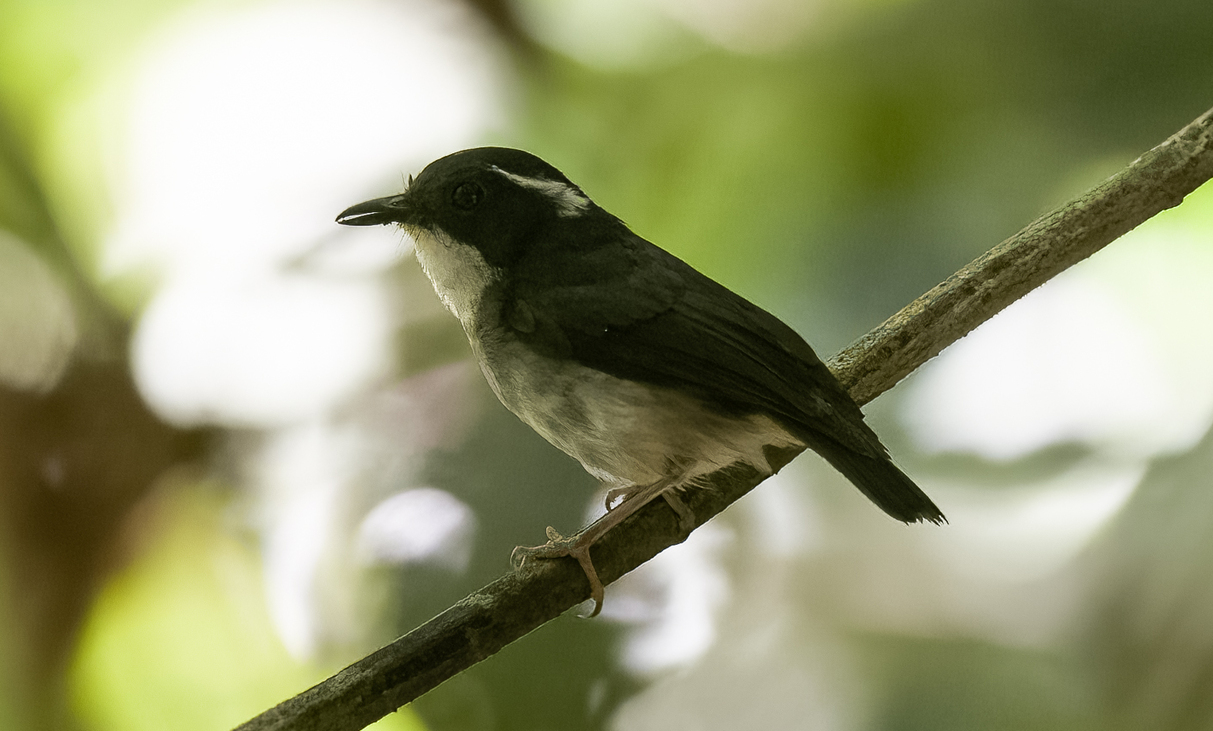
A male of the subspecies F. b. samarensis.

Usually secretive and solitary remaining hidden in low and dense foliage.

Its diet mostly unknown but it includes small invertebrates. It is usually solitary and typically found in dense undergrowth. This bird's breeding habits are poorly known. Birds in breeding condition with enlarged gonads have been collected in May and June. One nest has been found made of roots and leaves containing 2 eggs. No other information is known.

== Habitat and conservation status ==
Its natural habitats at tropical moist lowland primary forest and well developed secondary forest up to 1,200 meters above sea level. It is often seen close to the forest floor staying in the low understory.

IUCN has assessed this bird as vulnerable with the population being estimated at 2,500 to 9,999 mature individuals. Extensive lowland deforestation on all islands in its range is the main threat. Most remaining lowland forest that is not afforded protection leaving it vulnerable to both legal and Illegal logging, conversion into farmlands through Slash-and-burn and mining. Most Ebird (approximately two-thirds) and sight observations are in the PICOP Logging Concession in Agusan del Sur and Surigao del Sur, since the closure of PICOP, illegal settlers have massively deforested the area for illegal hardwoods and have been replanting cleared areas with paper pulp trees which do cannot support these birds.

It occurs in the protected areas of Pasonanca Natural Park, Mount Apo National Park and Mt. Hilong-hilong National Park but enforcement and protection from loggers are lax.
