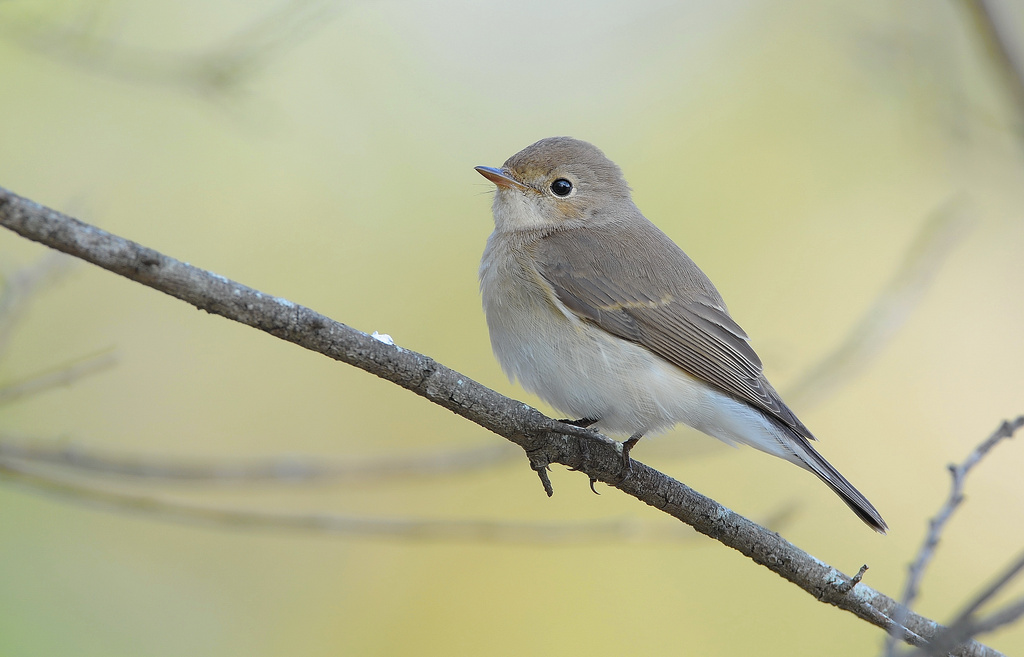
- Female red-breasted flycatcher (Ficedula parva)

Scientific classification
- Kingdom: Animalia
- Phylum: Chordata
- Class: Aves
- Order: Passeriformes
- Family: Muscicapidae
- Subfamily: Saxicolinae
- Genus: Ficedula; Brisson, 1760

Type species
- Motacilla hypoleuca Pallas, 1764

Species
- 30+, see text.

Synonyms
- Siphia

= Ficedula =

Genus of birds

The Ficedula flycatchers are a genus of Old World flycatchers. The genus is the largest in the family, containing around thirty species. They have sometimes been included in the genus Muscicapa. The genus is found in Europe, Asia and Africa. Several species are highly migratory, whereas other species are sedentary.

== Taxonomy and systematics ==
The genus was introduced by the French naturalist Mathurin Jacques Brisson in 1760 with the European pied flycatcher (Ficedula hypoleuca) as the type species. The genus name is from Latin and refers to a small fig-eating bird (ficus, "fig") supposed to change into the blackcap in winter.

=== Extant species ===
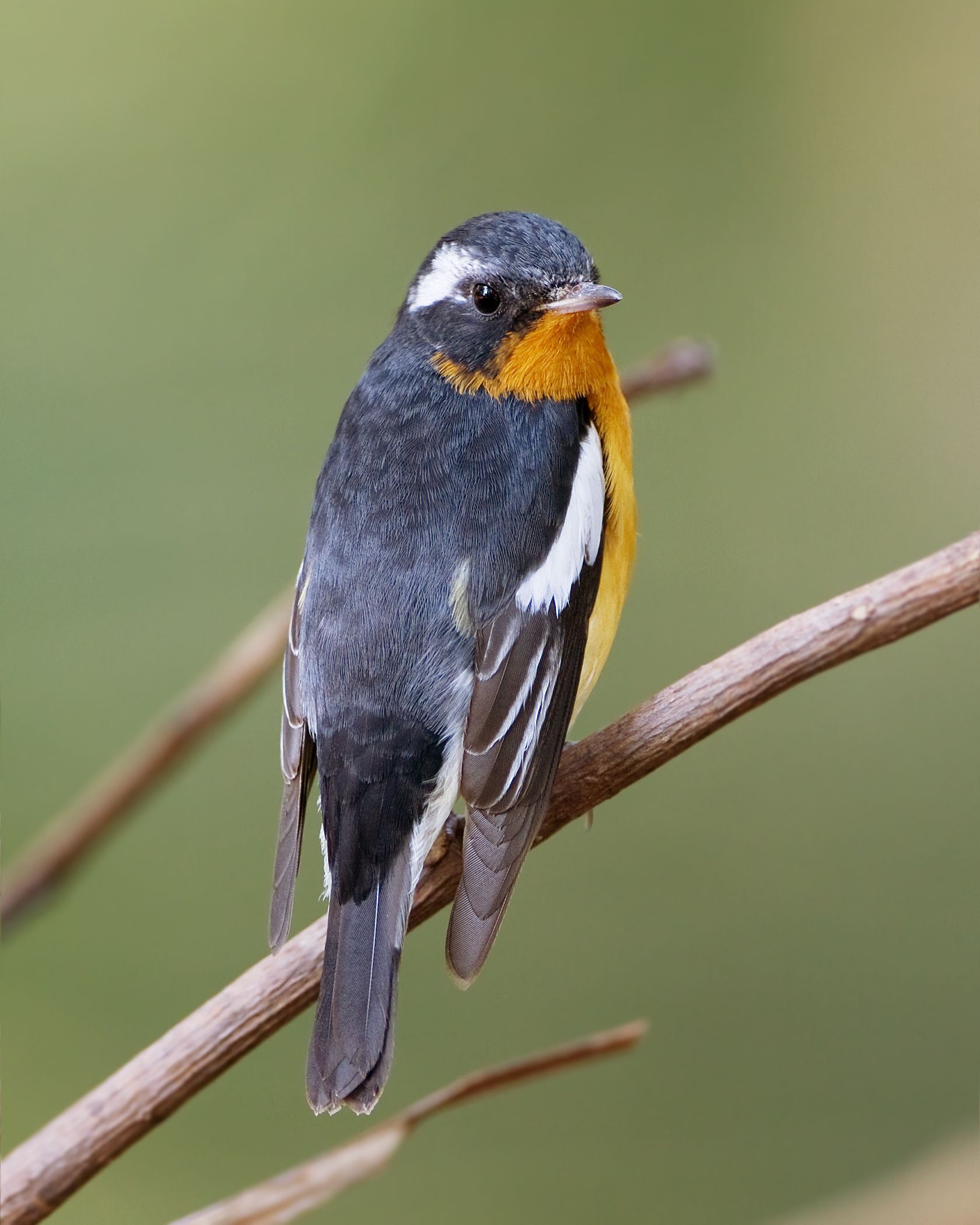
Male mugimaki flycatcher

The genus contains the following species:

Image	Common name	Scientific name	Distribution
	Yellow-rumped flycatcher	Ficedula zanthopygia	Manchuria, China and Korea; winters to Malay Peninsula and Sumatra
-	Green-backed flycatcher	Ficedula elisae	northeastern China; winters to Malay Peninsula
	Narcissus flycatcher	Ficedula narcissina	Kuril Islands, Manchuria and Japan; winters to Hainan, northeastern Borneo and Philippines
-	Ryukyu flycatcher	Ficedula owstoni	Ryukyu Islands
	Slaty-blue flycatcher	Ficedula tricolor	Himalayas, central China, Yunnan and northern Indochina
	Snowy-browed flycatcher	Ficedula hyperythra	Himalayas, southern China, Taiwan and Southeast Asia
	Mugimaki flycatcher	Ficedula mugimaki	Mongolia, Korea, southern Siberia and northeastern China; winters to Southeast Asia
	Slaty-backed flycatcher	Ficedula erithacus	eastern Himalayas, central/southern China; winters to northern Indochina
	Pygmy flycatcher	Ficedula hodgsoni	eastern Himalayas and Southeast Asia
	Rufous-gorgeted flycatcher	Ficedula strophiata	Himalayas, Patkai, central/southern China, northern Indochina and eastern Vietnam
	Sapphire flycatcher	Ficedula sapphira	Eastern Himalaya, central/southern China and northern Indochina
	Ultramarine flycatcher	Ficedula superciliaris	eastern Afghanistan to Hengduan Mountains; winters in India and northwestern Indochina
	Little pied flycatcher	Ficedula westermanni	Himalayas and Southeast Asia
	Rusty-tailed flycatcher	Ficedula ruficauda	Tian Shan and Himalayas; winters to Western Ghats
	Kashmir flycatcher	Ficedula subrubra	Nilgiri Mountains and Sri Lanka
	Red-breasted flycatcher	Ficedula parva	Europe and Caucasus ; winters to South Asia
	Taiga flycatcher	Ficedula albicilla	Siberia; winters to Indomalaya
	Semicollared flycatcher	Ficedula semitorquata	eastern Mediterranean; winters to East Africa
	Atlas pied flycatcher	Ficedula speculigera	north-west Africa
	European pied flycatcher	Ficedula hypoleuca	Europe; winters to equatorial Africa
	Collared flycatcher	Ficedula albicollis	Europe; winters to southeastern Africa
	Black-and-orange flycatcher	Ficedula nigrorufa	southern Western Ghats
	Tanimbar flycatcher	Ficedula riedeli	Tanimbar Islands (Larat and Yamdena)
	Rufous-chested flycatcher	Ficedula dumetoria	Malesia
-	Furtive flycatcher	Ficedula disposita	Luzon
	Palawan flycatcher	Ficedula platenae	Palawan
	Rufous-throated flycatcher	Ficedula rufigula	Sulawesi
-	Cinnamon-chested flycatcher	Ficedula buruensis	Maluku Islands (Buru, Seram and Kai Besar)
-	Sumba flycatcher	Ficedula harterti	Sumba
	Black-banded flycatcher	Ficedula timorensis	Timor
	Little slaty flycatcher	Ficedula basilanica	Philippines Mindanao, Leyte and Samar
	Bundok flycatcher	Ficedula luzoniensis	montane Philippines
	Cryptic flycatcher	Ficedula crypta	Mindanao
-	Lompobattang flycatcher	Ficedula bonthaina	Lompobattang Massif, Sulawesi
	Damar flycatcher	Ficedula henrici	Damar Island

=== Former species ===
Formerly, some authorities also considered the following species (or subspecies) as species within the genus Ficedula:

- Indian black-naped blue monarch (as Siphia Styani)

=== Speciation ===
A 2015 study on genomic pattern of differentiation, also known as islands of speciation by Burri et al., in the Ficedula flycatchers. Islands of differentiation are genomic regions with elevated measures of genetic differentiation. The authors examined island of differentiation within genomes and sought to answer (1) how they are formed and (2) what role they have in speciation. The flycatcher species complex is made up of four sister species and has a broad species range over all of Europe and parts of North Africa. The authors sequenced 200 genomes from 10 populations to an average of 14x coverage.

The authors tested two prominent models for the accumulation of islands of speciation, speciation with gene flow and linkage selection. Some of the expected patterns for islands of differentiation forming accumulating under a gene flow model and reduced sequence divergence outside the islands of differentiation compared to the rest of the genome and expansion of the islands of differentiation as reproductive isolation is reinforced during the speciation process. Based on the genomic data, expectations from the speciation with gene flow model were not well supported. Instead there was more support for the linkage selection model for islands of variation model. Such as an inverse correlation between recombination rate and differentiation, low amounts of ancestral variation in low recombining regions, and a positive relationship with nucleotide diversity and recombination rate. Some of the main findings from the study were:

- The differentiation landscapes were very similar across the four flycatcher species.
- Tests using population genetic parameters to test assumptions indicated that differentiation landscape across the genomes were likely not caused by gene flow.
- The signatures for background selection highly outweighed selective sweep signatures.

==== By reinforcement ====
F. hypoleuca vis-a-vis F. albicollis are speciating from each other by reinforcement, as evidenced by differences between colouration in sympatry versus allopatry. This is evidence for speciation by reinforcement.

== Description ==
The flycatchers in the genus Ficedula are typically small with slender bodies and rounded heads. In many cases they are sexually dimorphic in their plumage, with the males being brightly or strikingly coloured and the females being duller or drabber.
