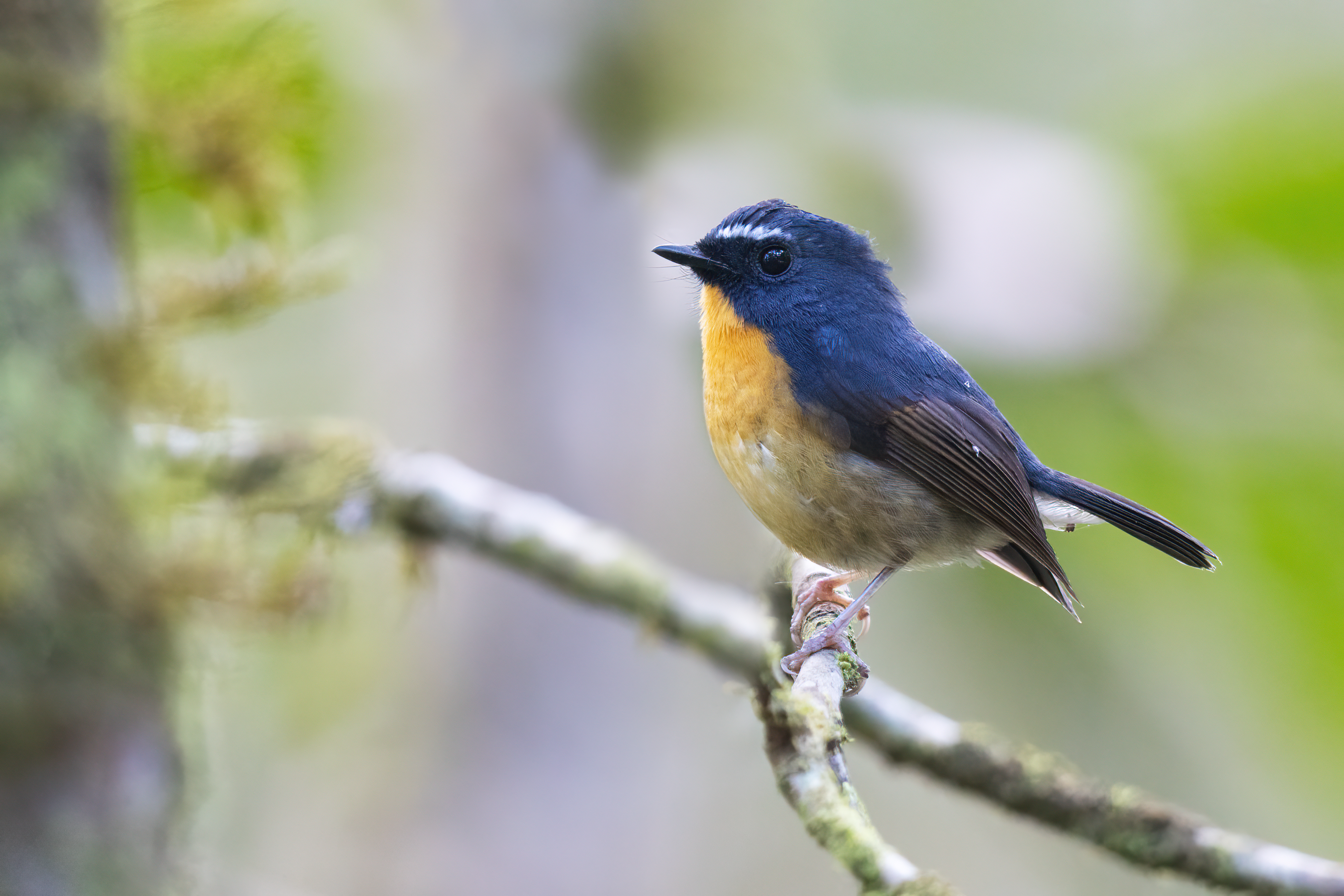
- Male

Conservation status
- Least Concern (IUCN 3.1)

Scientific classification
- Kingdom: Animalia
- Phylum: Chordata
- Class: Aves
- Order: Passeriformes
- Family: Muscicapidae
- Genus: Ficedula
- Species: F. hyperythra

Binomial name
- Ficedula hyperythra (Blyth, 1843)

= Snowy-browed flycatcher =

Species of bird

The snowy-browed flycatcher (Ficedula hyperythra) is a species of bird in the Old World flycatcher family Muscicapidae.

It is found in Bangladesh, Bhutan, Cambodia, China, India, Indonesia, Laos, Malaysia, Myanmar, Nepal, Philippines, Taiwan, Thailand and Vietnam. Its natural habitats are subtropical or tropical moist lowland forest and subtropical or tropical moist montane forest.

Fourteen subspecies are recognised:

- F. h. hyperythra (Blyth, 1843) – central Himalayas to central south China, north, central Indochina, north Thailand and Myanmar
- F. h. annamensis (Robinson & Kloss, 1919) – central south Vietnam
- F. h. innexa (Swinhoe, 1866) – Taiwan
- F. h. sumatrana (Hachisuka, 1926) – montane Malay Peninsula, Sumatra and north Borneo
- F. h. mjobergi (Hartert, EJO, 1925) – montane northwest Borneo
- F. h. vulcani (Robinson, 1918) – montane Java, Bali and Lombok, Sumbawa and Flores (west, central Lesser Sunda Islands)
- F. h. clarae (Mayr, 1944) – montane Timor and Wetar (east Lesser Sunda Islands)
- F. h. audacis (Hartert, EJO, 1906) – Babar Islands (far east Lesser Sunda Islands)
- F. h. annalisa (Stresemann, 1931) – montane north Sulawesi
- F. h. jugosae (Riley, 1921) – montane central, southeast, south Sulawesi
- F. h. betinabiru Rheindt, Prawiradilaga & Ashari & Suparno, 2020 – Taliabu (Sula Islands, east of Sulawesi)
- F. h. negroides (Stresemann, 1914) – Seram (central east Moluccas)
- F. h. pallidipectus (Hartert, EJO, 1903) – Bacan Islands (south of Halmahera, north Moluccas)
- F. h. alifura (Stresemann, 1912) – Buru (central west Moluccas)
- F. h. daggayana (Meyer de Schauensee & duPont, 1962) – Daggayan and Civoleg, Gingoog City
