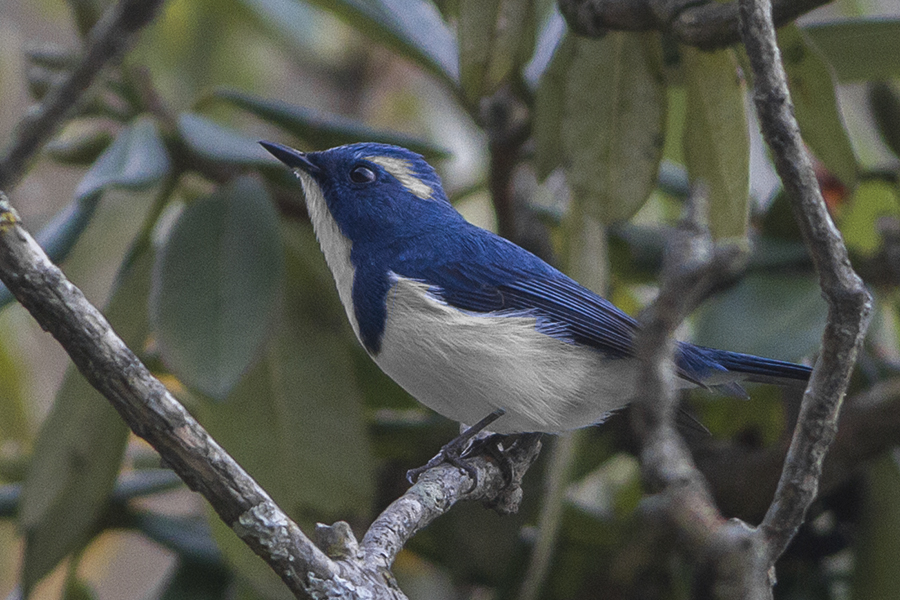
- Male from Pangot village of Nainital district of Uttarakhand, India

Conservation status
- Least Concern (IUCN 3.1)

Scientific classification
- Kingdom: Animalia
- Phylum: Chordata
- Class: Aves
- Order: Passeriformes
- Family: Muscicapidae
- Genus: Ficedula
- Species: F. superciliaris

Binomial name
- Ficedula superciliaris (Jerdon, 1840)

= Ultramarine flycatcher =

Species of bird

The ultramarine flycatcher or the white-browed blue flycatcher (Ficedula superciliaris) is a small arboreal Old World flycatcher in the Ficedula genus. Its breeding range extends from eastern Afghanistan to the Hengduan Mountains; it winters in India and northwestern Indochina.

== Description ==
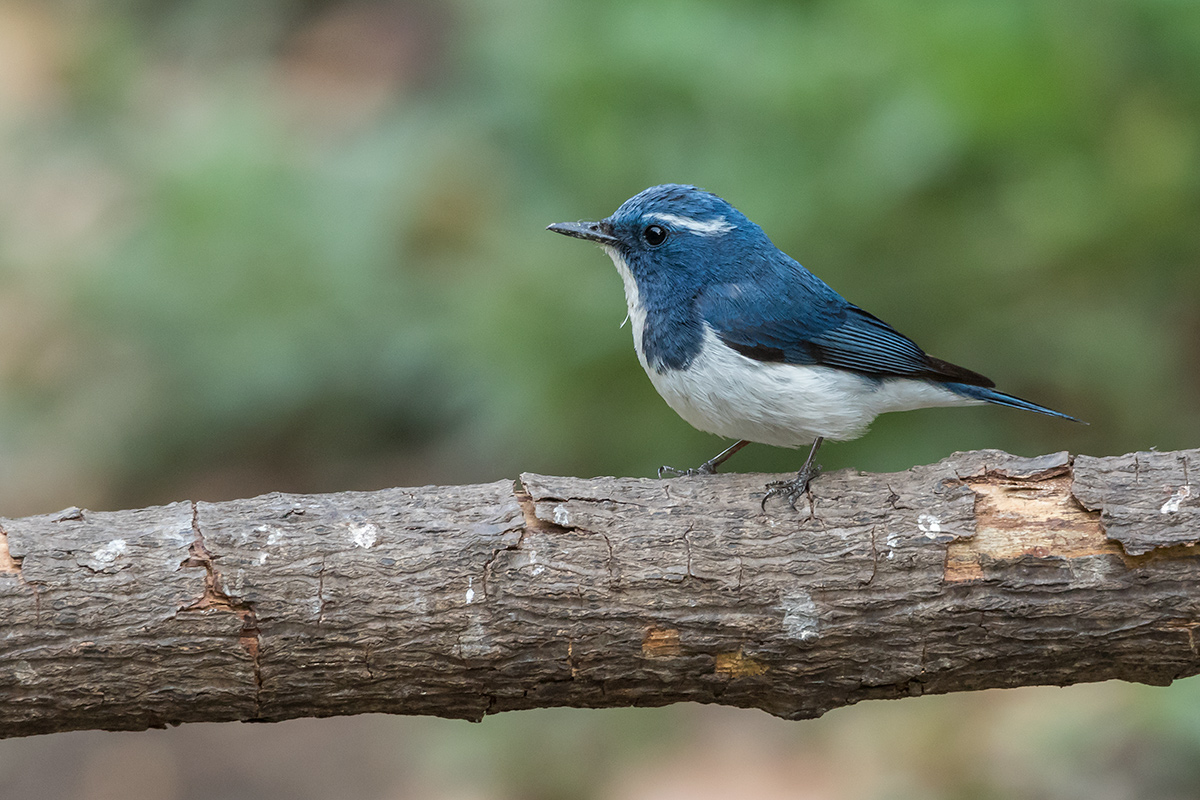
Male

Somewhat smaller in size than a sparrow (c. 10 cm) and with a stocky build. The male is deep blue above, sides of head and neck are deep blue, and a prominent white patch runs from centre of throat, through breast to belly. The amount of white on the brow and tail show clinal variation from West to East along the Himalayan foothills, which is sometimes taken to distinguish three subspecies:

- The western subspecies from the western Himalayas has a distinctive white supercilium and white bases to the outer tail feathers.
- The eastern subspecies (Ficedula superciliaris aestigma) from the eastern Himalayas lacks distinct white patches.
- The population from the south Assam hills (sometimes designated a third subspecies cleta) completely lack any supercilium.

Usually singly, though sometimes in mixed hunting parties in the winter. Keeps largely to the low trees and bushes, feeding among the foliage canopy, not venturing much into the open. Constantly jerks up its tail, often accompanied by fluffing of head feathers and trrr note, especially in proximity of nest. Diet is mainly insects.

== Distribution ==
Summer: Common breeding visitor to the western Himalayas, from Jammu and Kashmir and Himachal Pradesh to Uttarakhand (western race), and intergrading within Nepal with the eastern race Ficedula superciliaris aestigma which continues in the eastern Himalayas through Bhutan to Arunachal Pradesh. Breeding between 2000 and 2700 m, occasionally as low as 1800 m and as high as 3200 m. Also in the lower hills of Meghalaya and Nagaland, Khasi and Cachar hills, sometimes considered a third race; winter movements of this population are not known.

Habitat: Open, mixed forests of oak, rhododendron, pine, fir, etc., occasionally orchards.

Winter: Central India from Delhi south to northern Maharashtra, Goa, and eastward to Andhra Pradesh and Odisha. Wintering populations in the eastern states, possibly from Nepal/Sikkim, are mixed: a good part of this population also have a white supercilium and basal tail patches (see description below). Also sometimes found as a vagrant in the northern part of Bangladesh.

== Nesting ==
- Season: middle of April to early July
- Nest: soft structure of fine moss with some strips of bark and fine grass, lined with hair and rootlets, placed in holes or clefts in trees, at heights up to seven meters, or in a depression on a steep bank. Readily takes to nest boxes in hill station gardens.
- Eggs: 3 to 5, usually 4, olive greenish to dull stone-buff, densely freckled all over with reddish brown, or in another type, mostly around the large end, forming a cap. Average size 16x12.2 mm.

== Foraging behavior ==
Typically they respond to indirect cues more than direct cues in relation to risk management when foraging for food.

== Gallery ==
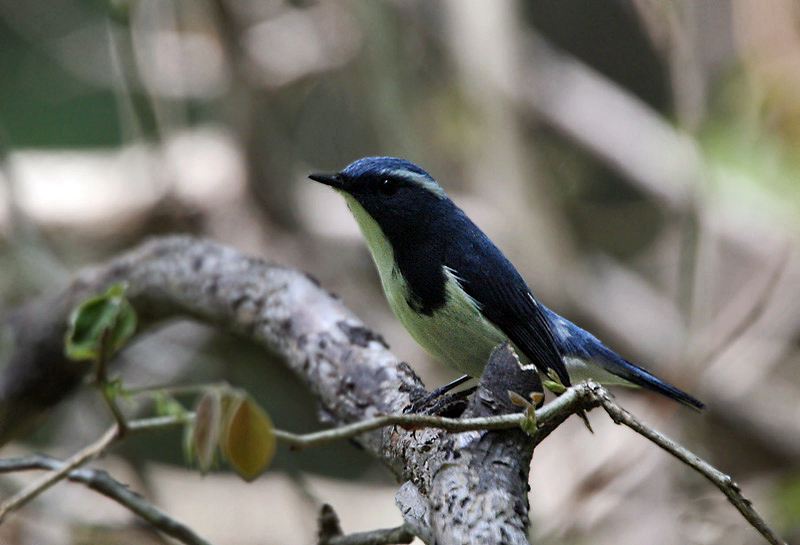
Male from Himachal Pradesh, India

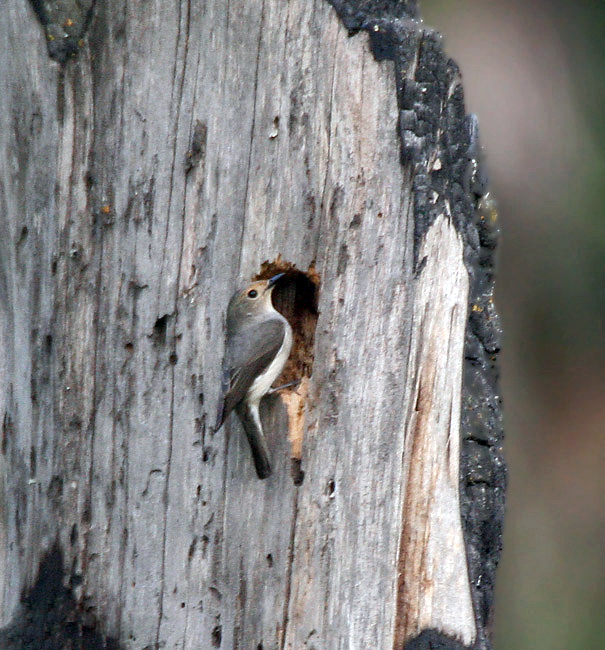
Female at Kullu - Manali District of Himachal Pradesh, India

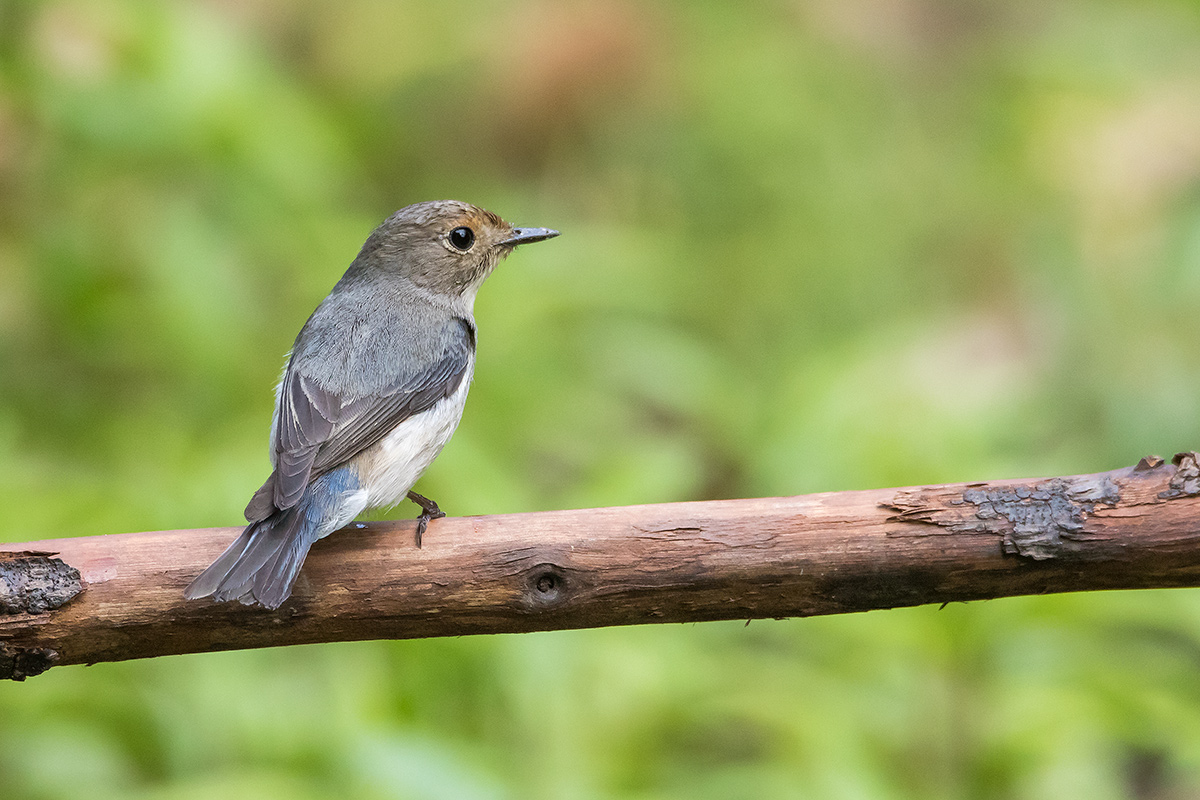
Female at Sattal, India

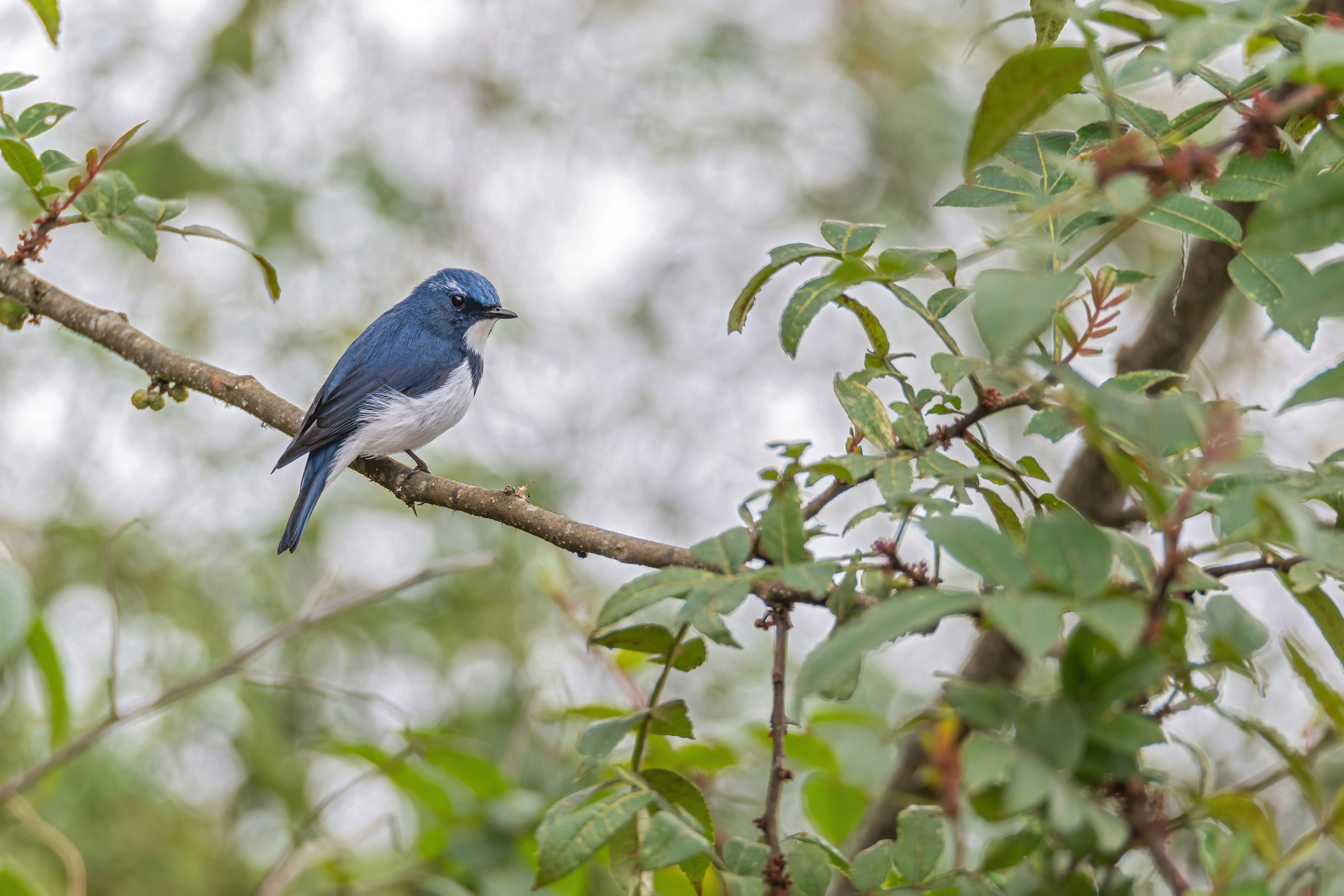
Male from Phoolchoki Forest, Godawari, Lalitpur Nepal.
