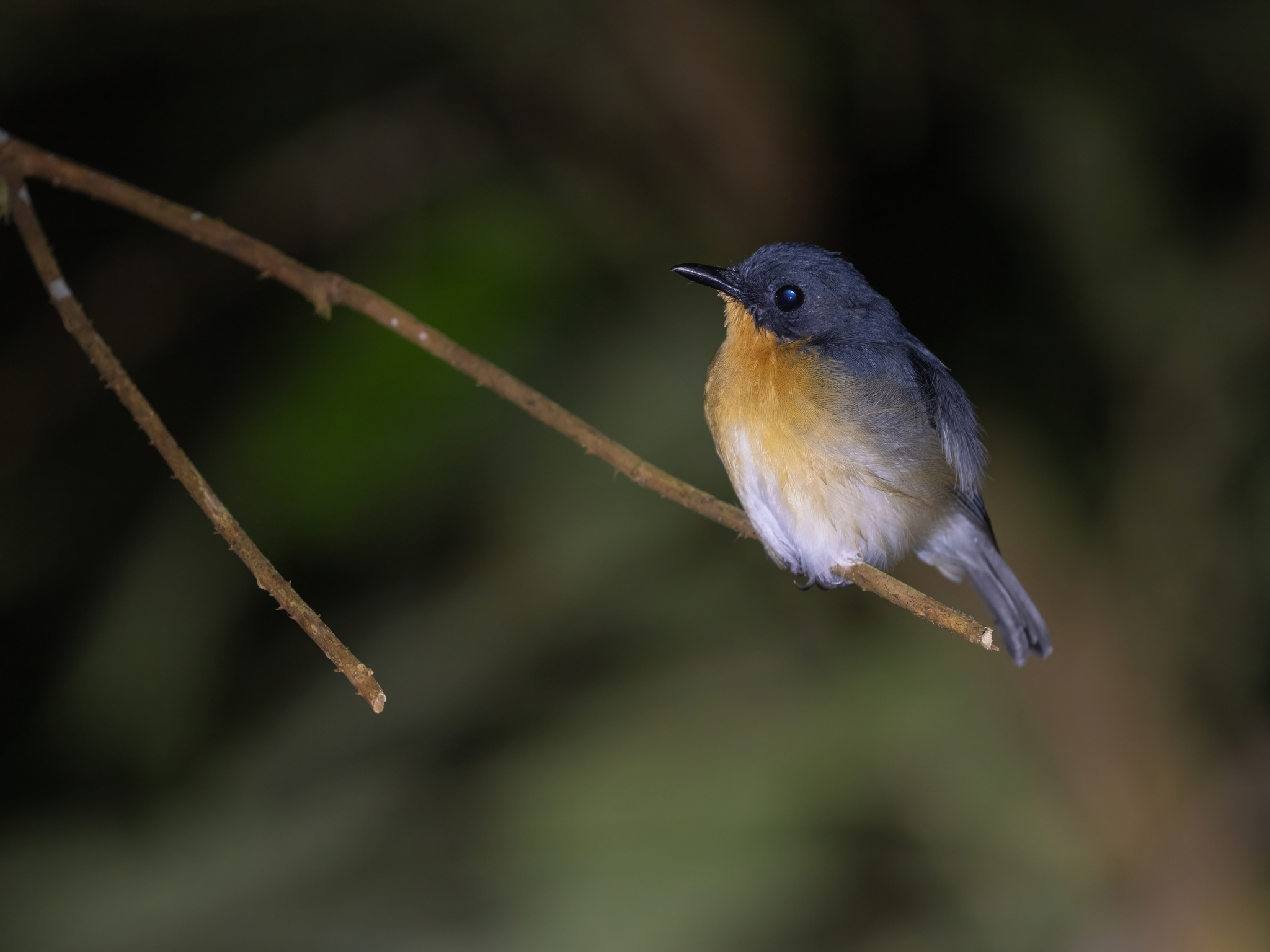

Conservation status
- Near Threatened (IUCN 3.1)

Scientific classification
- Kingdom: Animalia
- Phylum: Chordata
- Class: Aves
- Order: Passeriformes
- Family: Muscicapidae
- Genus: Ficedula
- Species: F. rufigula

Binomial name
- Ficedula rufigula (Wallace, 1865)

= Rufous-throated flycatcher =

Species of bird

The rufous-throated flycatcher (Ficedula rufigula) is a species of bird in the family Muscicapidae. It is endemic to Sulawesi, Indonesia. Its natural habitat is subtropical or tropical moist lowland forests. It is threatened by habitat loss.
