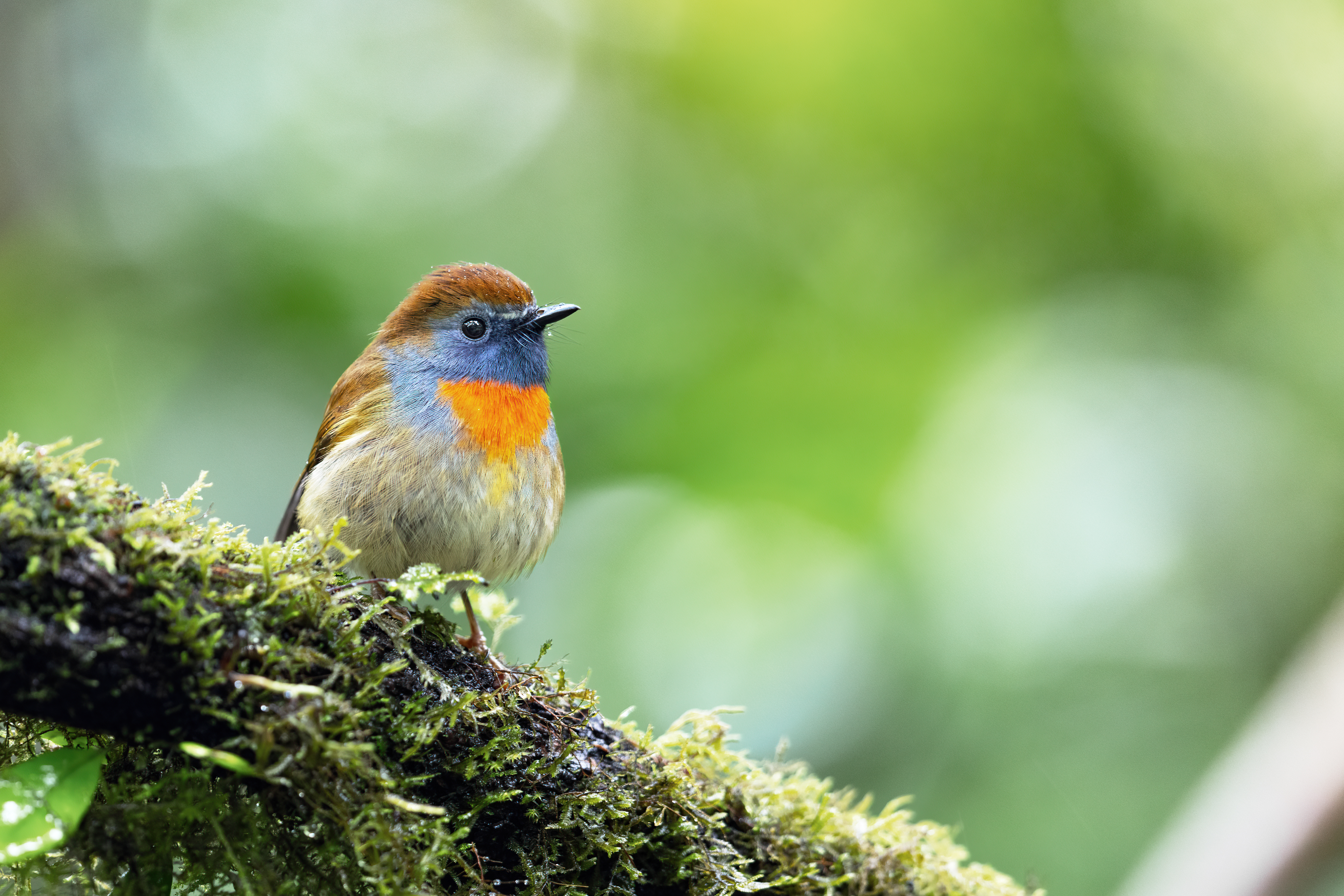

Conservation status
- Least Concern (IUCN 3.1)

Scientific classification
- Kingdom: Animalia
- Phylum: Chordata
- Class: Aves
- Order: Passeriformes
- Family: Muscicapidae
- Genus: Ficedula
- Species: F. strophiata

Binomial name
- Ficedula strophiata (Hodgson, 1837)

= Rufous-gorgeted flycatcher =

Species of bird

The rufous-gorgeted flycatcher (Ficedula strophiata) is a species of bird in the family Muscicapidae.

It is native to the Himalayas and Patkai ranges, central/southern China, northern Indochina and eastern Vietnam. Its natural habitat is subtropical or tropical moist montane forests. The rufous-gorgeted flycatcher is also common in the northern Kachin State of Myanmar, in temperate forest areas near boreal mountains. They spend winters in places like Thailand, North Laos, and Vietnam, and the Himalayas are a major breeding range. They perform altitudinal migrations.

As the name denotes, they are known for their reddish brown color with a distinctly colored patch on their throat.
