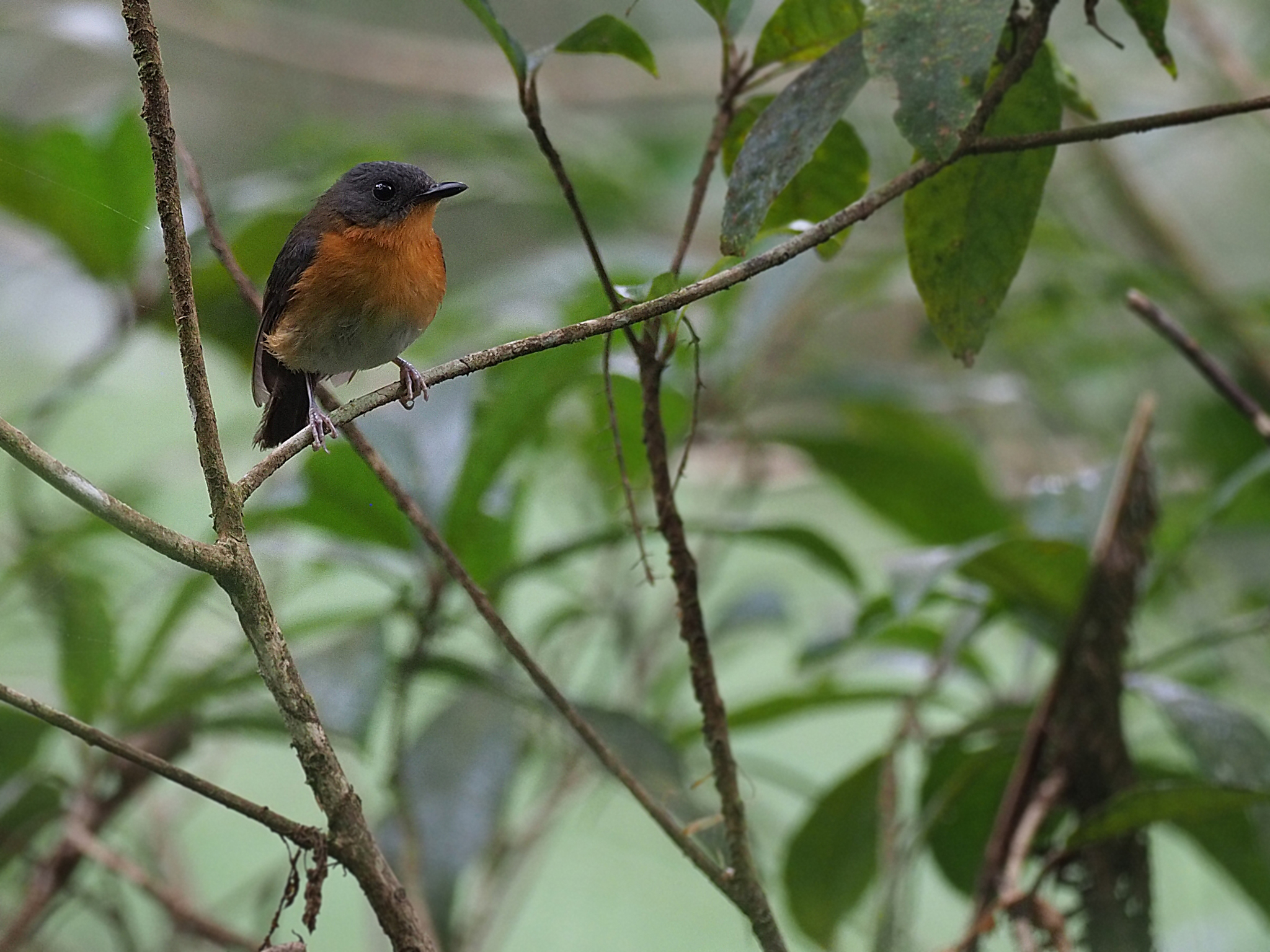

Conservation status
- Least Concern (IUCN 3.1)

Scientific classification
- Kingdom: Animalia
- Phylum: Chordata
- Class: Aves
- Order: Passeriformes
- Family: Muscicapidae
- Genus: Ficedula
- Species: F. buruensis

Binomial name
- Ficedula buruensis (Hartert, 1899)

= Cinnamon-chested flycatcher =

Species of bird

The cinnamon-chested flycatcher (Ficedula buruensis) is a species of bird in the family Muscicapidae. It is found in Buru, Seram, and Kai Besar. Its natural habitat is subtropical or tropical moist montane forests.
