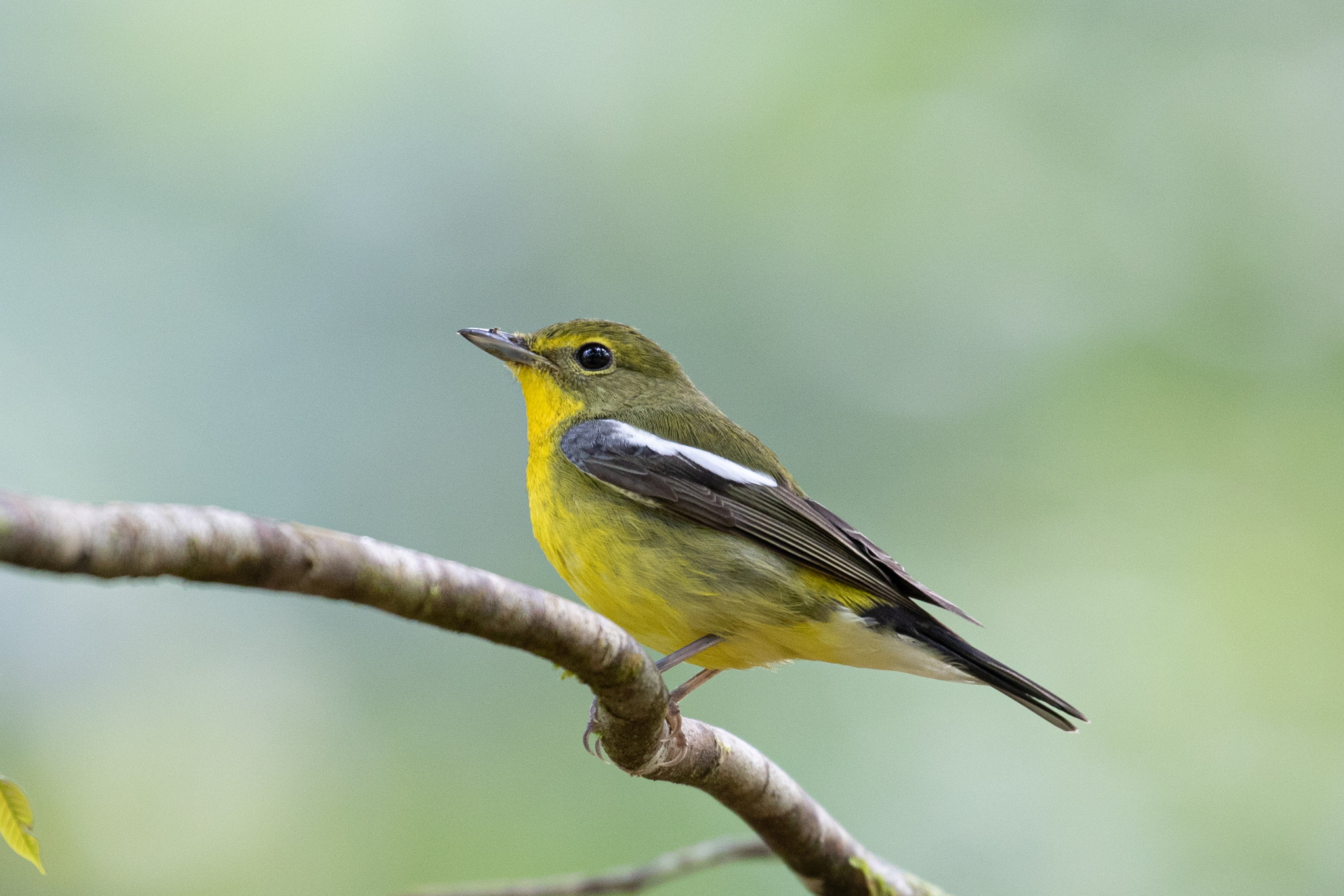
- Xiaolongmen Forest, Mentougou District, Beijing, China

Conservation status
- Least Concern (IUCN 3.1)

Scientific classification
- Kingdom: Animalia
- Phylum: Chordata
- Class: Aves
- Order: Passeriformes
- Family: Muscicapidae
- Genus: Ficedula
- Species: F. elisae

Binomial name
- Ficedula elisae (Weigold, 1922)

Synonyms
- Ficedula narcissina elisae

= Green-backed flycatcher =

Species of bird

The green-backed flycatcher (Ficedula elisae) is a bird in the family Muscicapidae, which contains the Old World flycatchers. It was long considered to be a subspecies of the narcissus flycatcher, but morphological and acoustical differences between the two indicate they are instead separate species. It breeds in northeastern China and winters in southeast Asia.

"F. beijingnica", proposed as a separate species called Beijing flycatcher or Peking flycatcher, is now considered by experts to be the first-summer male of this species and thus no longer a valid taxon.
