= Lompobattang flycatcher =

Conservation status
- Endangered (IUCN 3.1)

Scientific classification
- Kingdom: Animalia
- Phylum: Chordata
- Class: Aves
- Order: Passeriformes
- Family: Muscicapidae
- Genus: Ficedula
- Species: F. bonthaina

Binomial name
- Ficedula bonthaina (Hartert, 1896)

Species of bird

The Lompobattang flycatcher (Ficedula bonthaina), also spelt Lompobatang flycatcher, is a species of bird in the family Muscicapidae. It is endemic to the Indonesia island of Sulawesi. Its natural habitat is subtropical or tropical moist montane forests. It is threatened by habitat loss.
