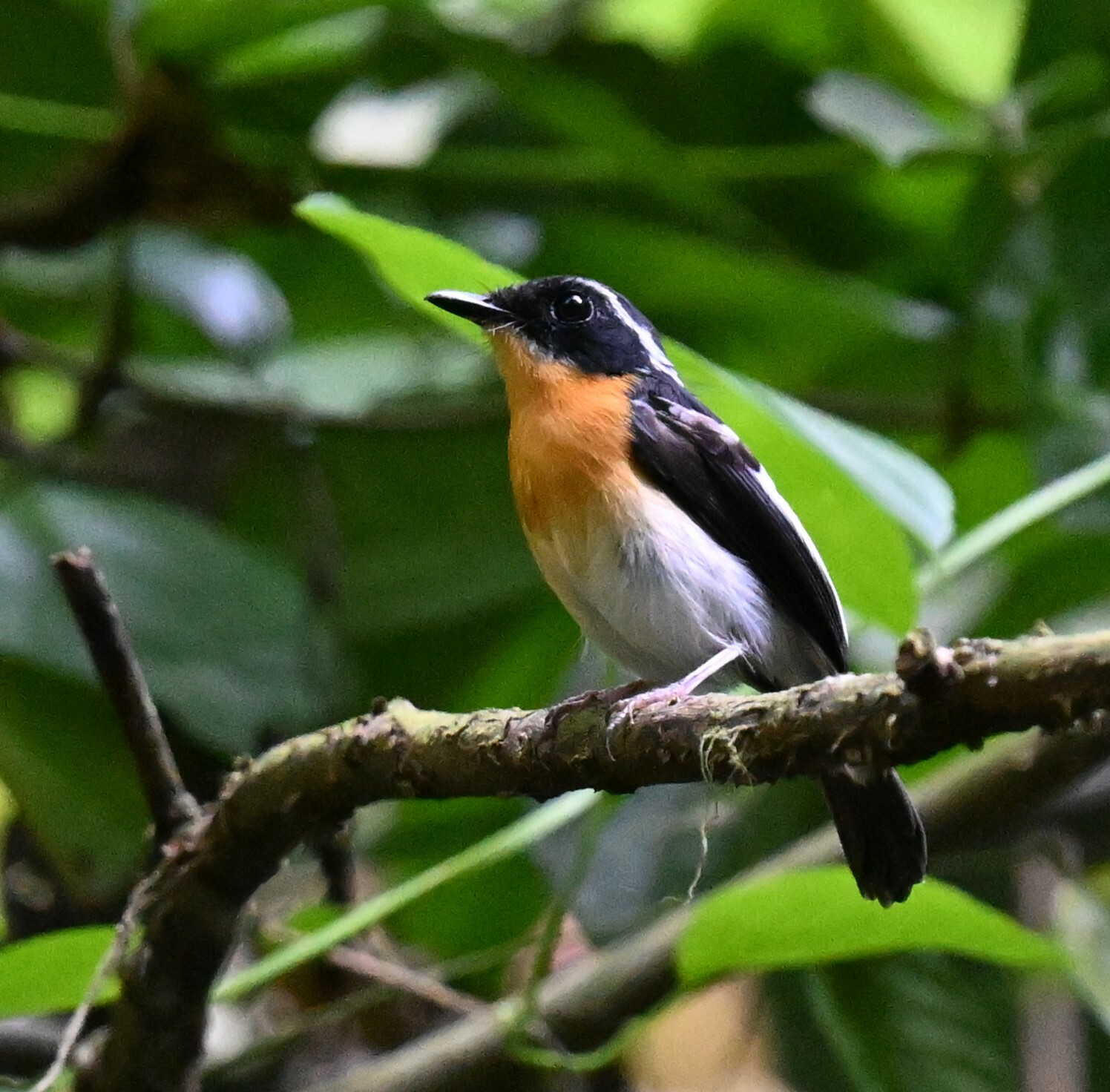
- Male
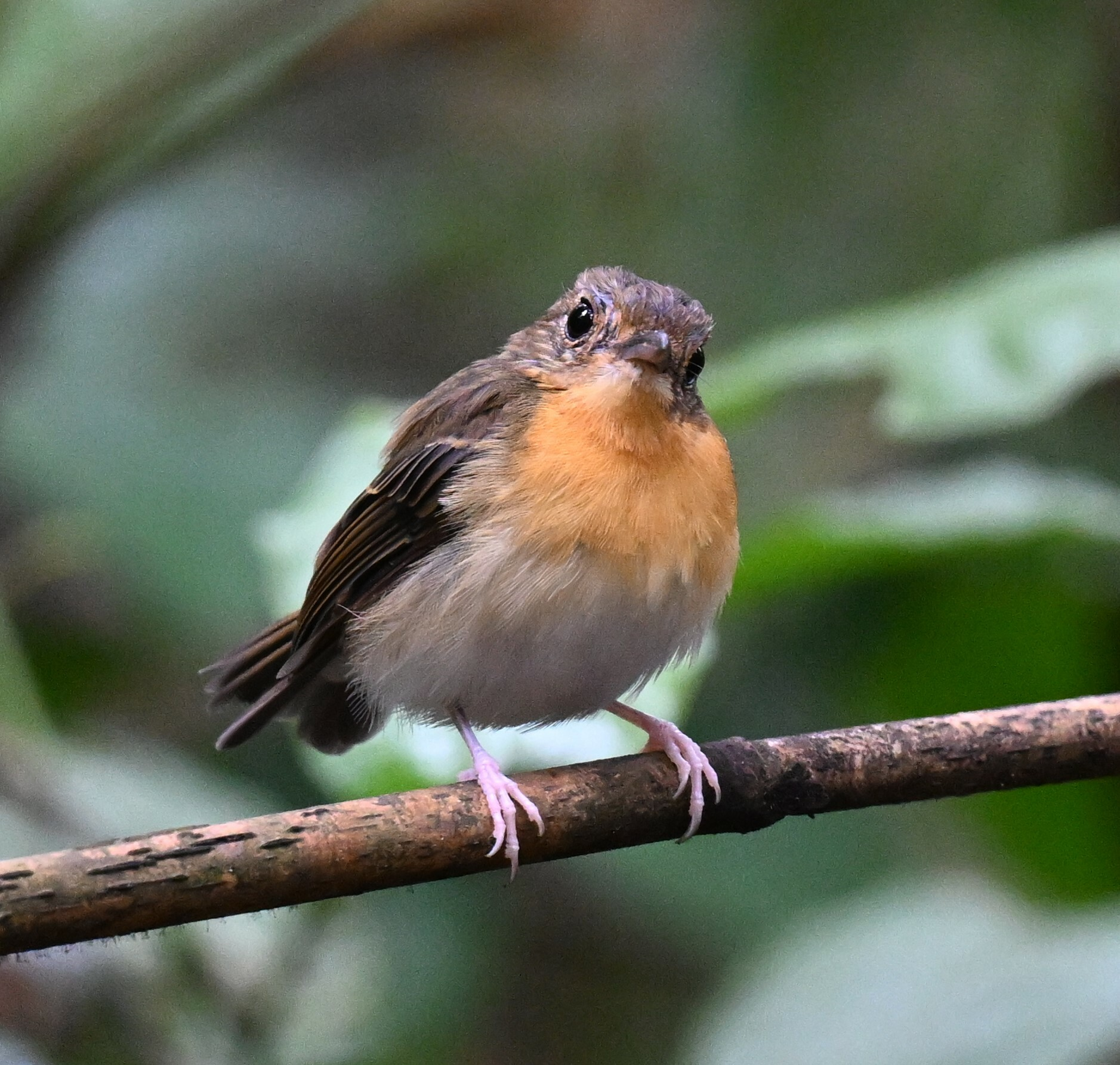
- Female

Conservation status
- Least Concern (IUCN 3.1)

Scientific classification
- Kingdom: Animalia
- Phylum: Chordata
- Class: Aves
- Order: Passeriformes
- Family: Muscicapidae
- Genus: Ficedula
- Species: F. dumetoria

Binomial name
- Ficedula dumetoria (Wallace, 1864)

Synonyms
- Erythromyias dumetoria; Erythromyias muelleri

= Rufous-chested flycatcher =

Species of bird

The rufous-chested flycatcher (Ficedula dumetoria) is a species of bird in the family Muscicapidae. It is found in Brunei, Indonesia, Malaysia, and Thailand. Its natural habitats are subtropical or tropical moist lowland forests and subtropical or tropical moist montane forests. It is threatened by habitat loss.

The former subspecies Ficedula dumetoria riedeli is now usually considered a full species - the Tanimbar flycatcher.

It is insectivorous.
