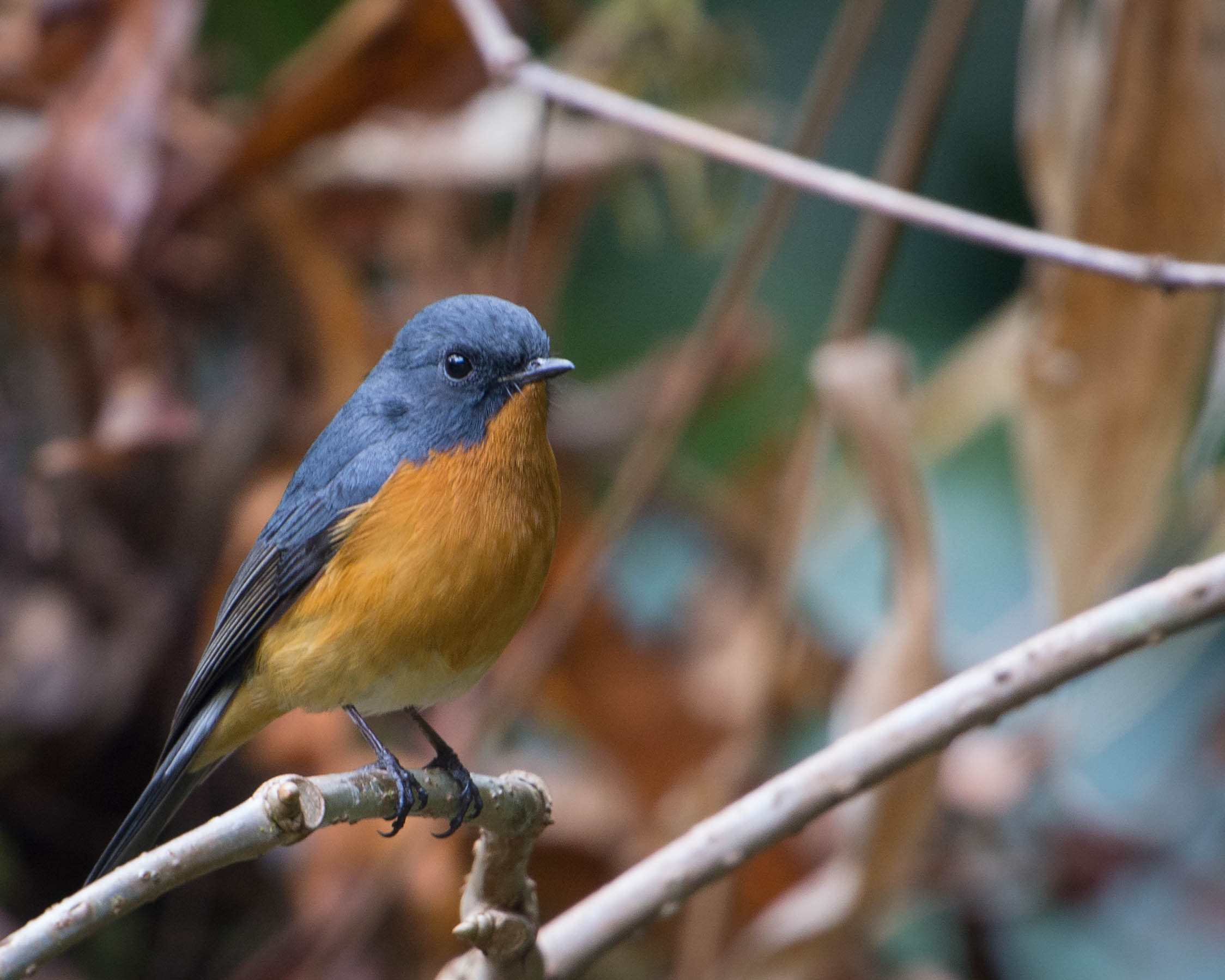

Conservation status
- Least Concern (IUCN 3.1)

Scientific classification
- Kingdom: Animalia
- Phylum: Chordata
- Class: Aves
- Order: Passeriformes
- Family: Muscicapidae
- Genus: Ficedula
- Species: F. erithacus

Binomial name
- Ficedula erithacus (Blyth, 1861)

Synonyms
- Ficedula sordida Godwin-Austen, 1874; Ficedula hodgsonii; (J. Verreaux, 1871)

= Slaty-backed flycatcher =

Species of bird

The slaty-backed flycatcher (Ficedula erithacus) is a species of bird in the family Muscicapidae.

It is native to the eastern Himalayas, central China, Yunnan; it winters to northern Indochina. Its natural habitats are subtropical or tropical moist lowland forests and subtropical or tropical moist montane forests.

It is omnivorous.
