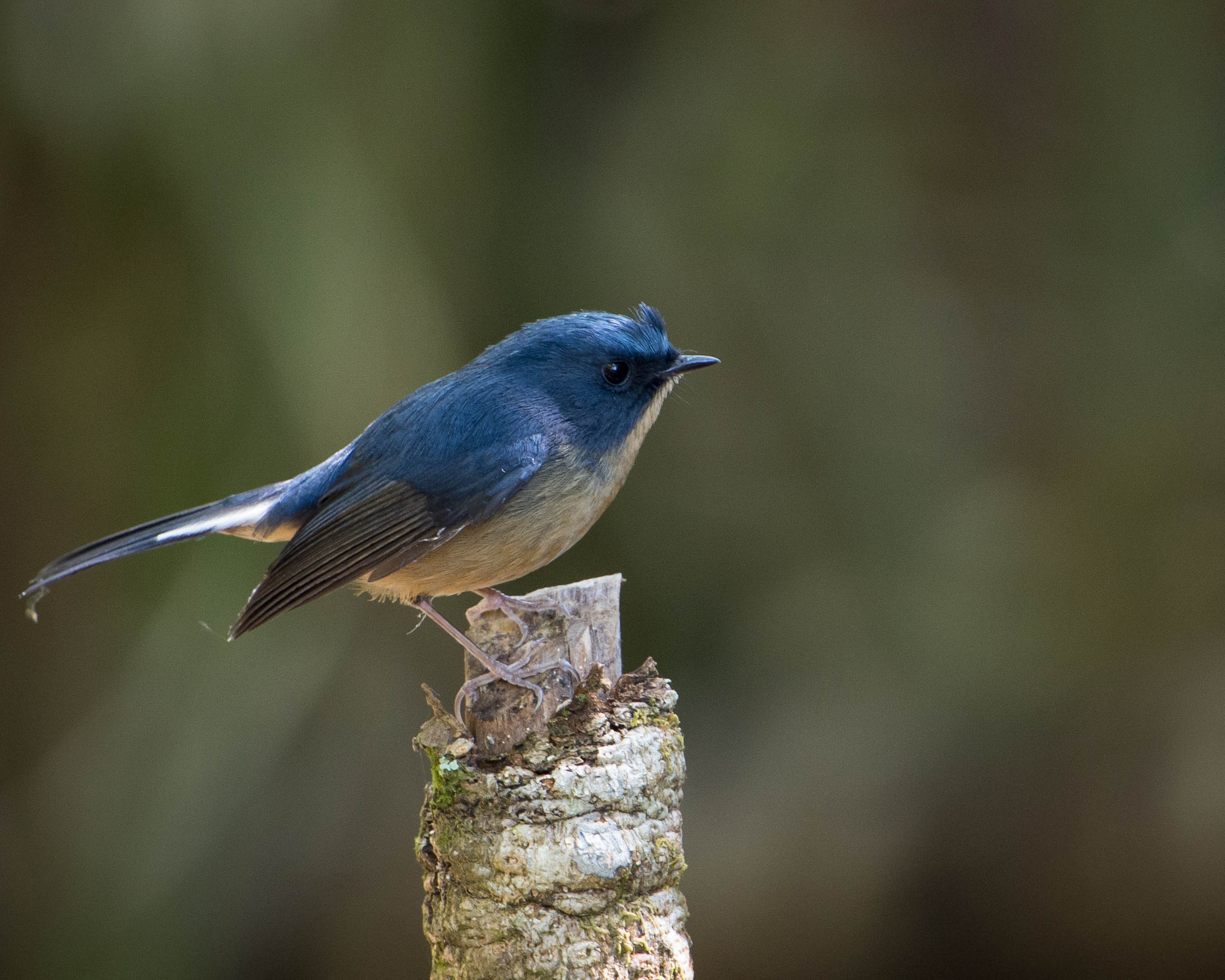
- Male
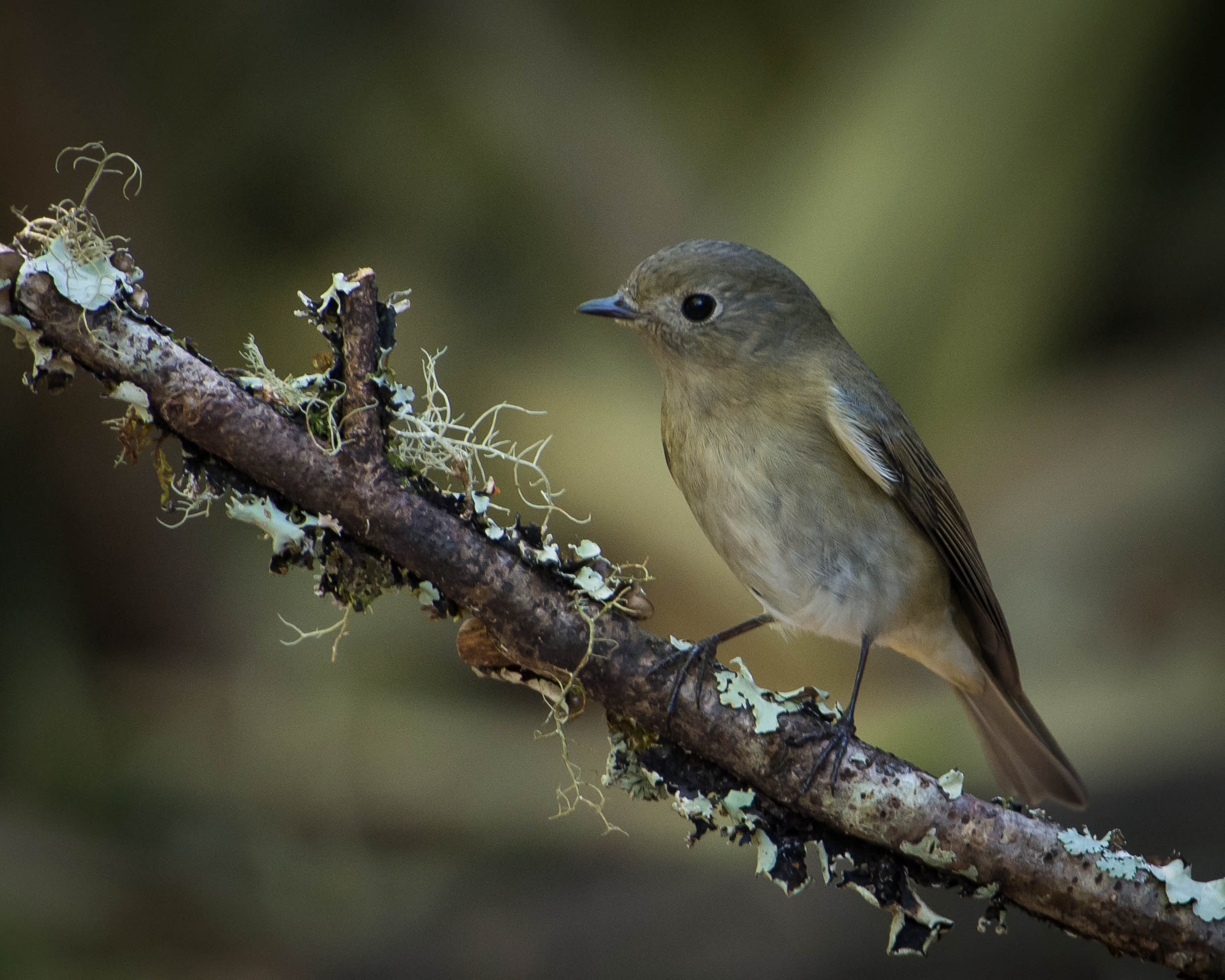
- Female

Conservation status
- Least Concern (IUCN 3.1)

Scientific classification
- Kingdom: Animalia
- Phylum: Chordata
- Class: Aves
- Order: Passeriformes
- Family: Muscicapidae
- Genus: Ficedula
- Species: F. tricolor

Binomial name
- Ficedula tricolor (Hodgson, 1845)

Synonyms
- Digenea leucomelanura; Ficedula leucomelanura

= Slaty-blue flycatcher =

Species of bird

The slaty-blue flycatcher (Ficedula tricolor) is a species of bird in the family Muscicapidae.

== Distribution and habitat ==
It is native to the Himalayas, centre China, Yunnan and northern Indochina. Its natural habitat is subtropical or tropical moist montane forests. A single sight was recorded from Sigiriya, Sri Lanka in February 1993.
