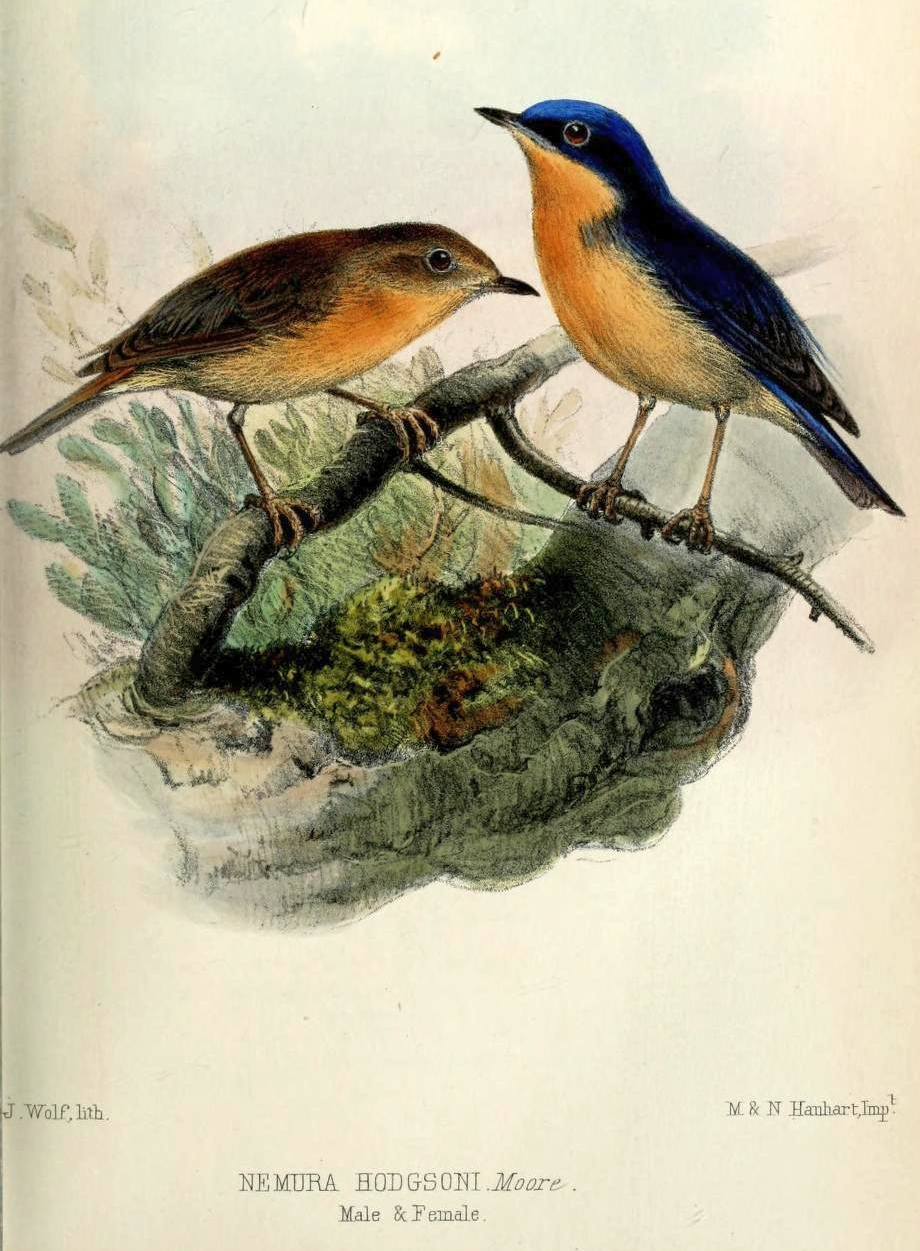

Conservation status
- Least Concern (IUCN 3.1)

Scientific classification
- Kingdom: Animalia
- Phylum: Chordata
- Class: Aves
- Order: Passeriformes
- Family: Muscicapidae
- Genus: Ficedula
- Species: F. hodgsoni

Binomial name
- Ficedula hodgsoni (Moore, F, 1854)

Synonyms
- Ficedula hodgsoni (Moore, 1854)

= Pygmy flycatcher =

Species of bird

The pygmy flycatcher (Ficedula hodgsoni), also known as the pygmy blue-flycatcher, is a bird species of the family Muscicapidae.

== Distribution and habitat ==
It is native to Eastern Himalaya, western and southeastern Indochina, the Malay Peninsula, Bukit Barisan and montane Borneo. Its natural habitat is subtropical or tropical moist montane forests.

== Gallery ==
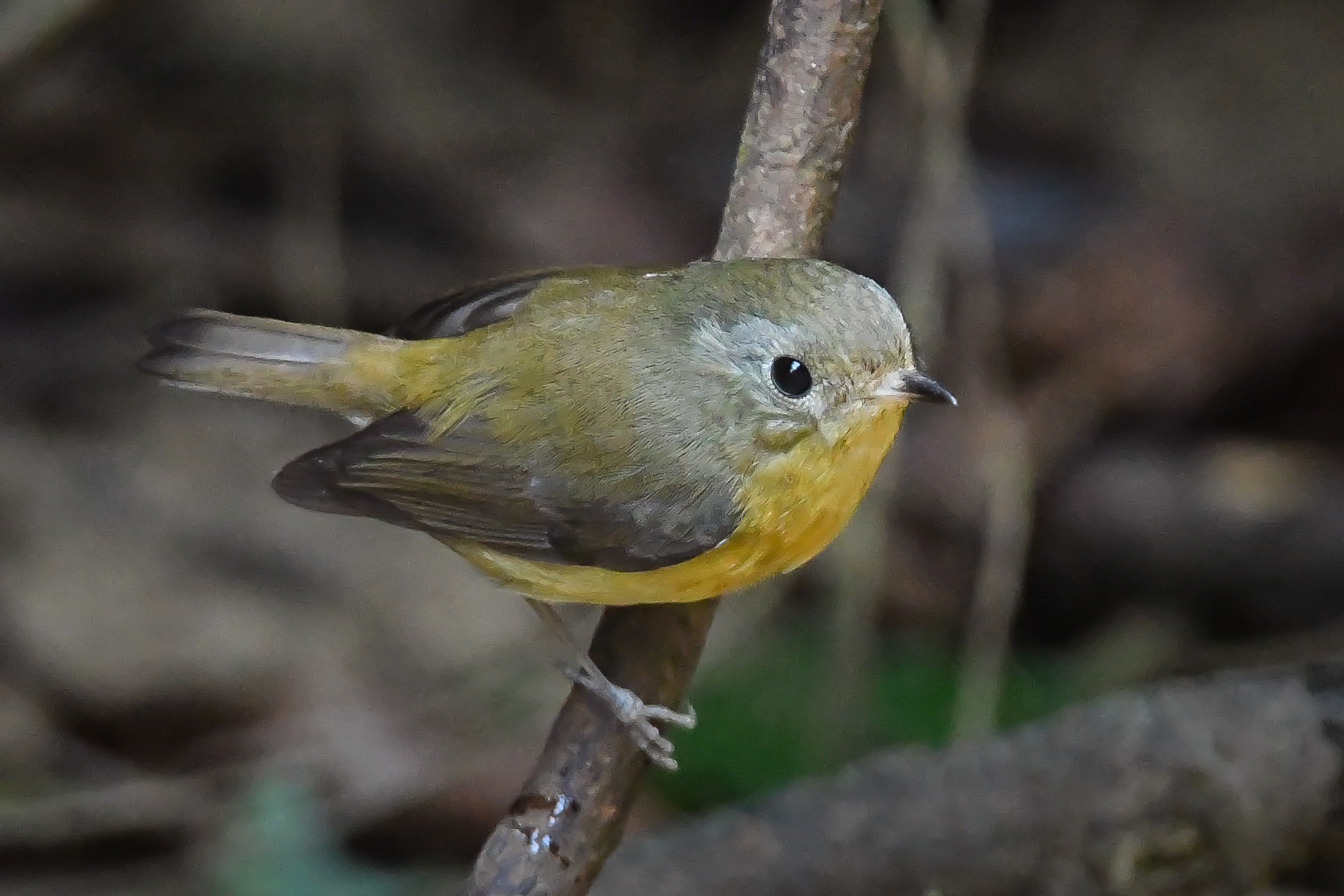
Spotted in Dulung Hide, Dulung Reserve Forest, Lakhimpur, Assam

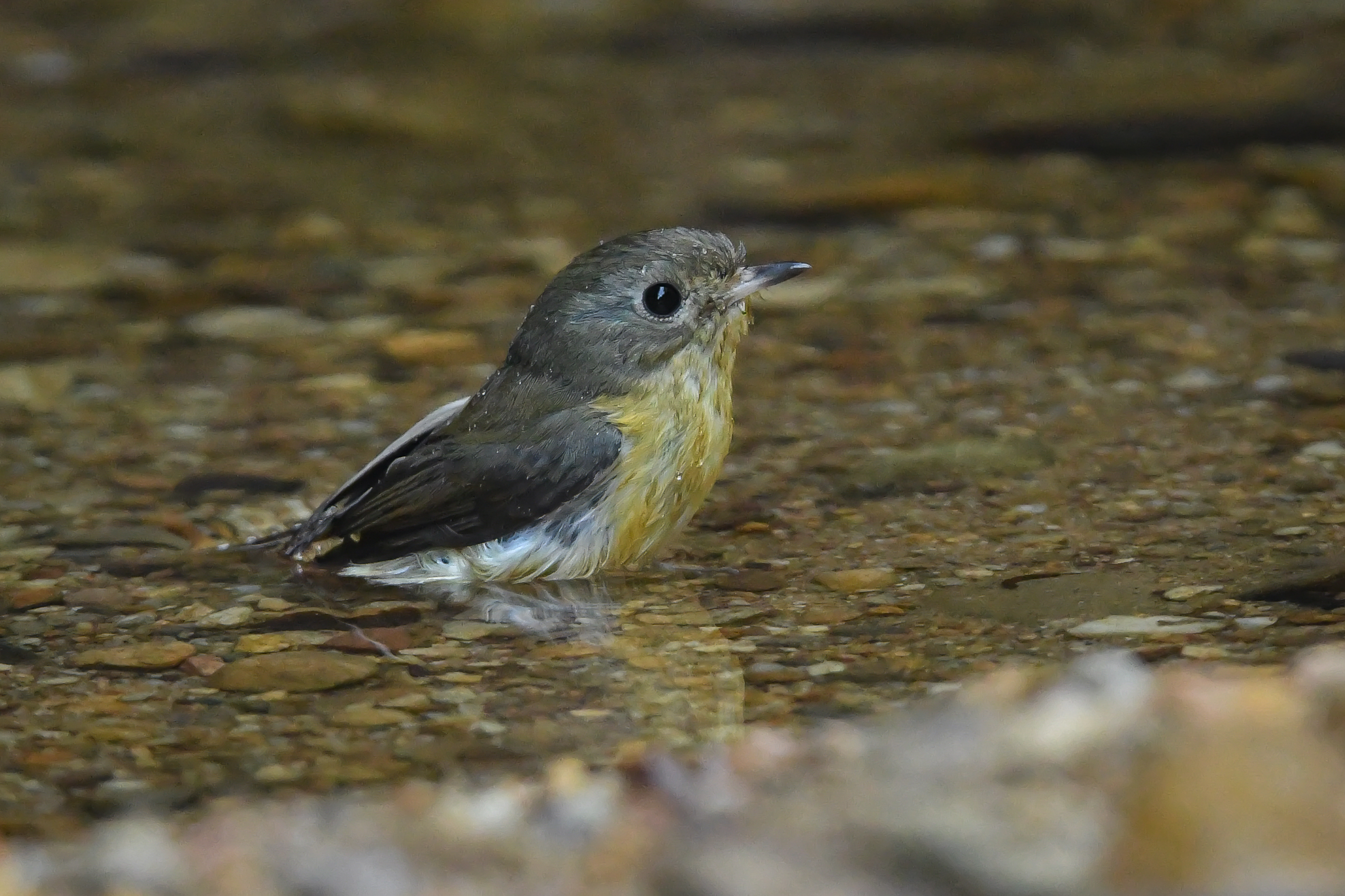
Spotted in Dulung Hide, Dulung Reserve Forest, Lakhimpur, Assam
