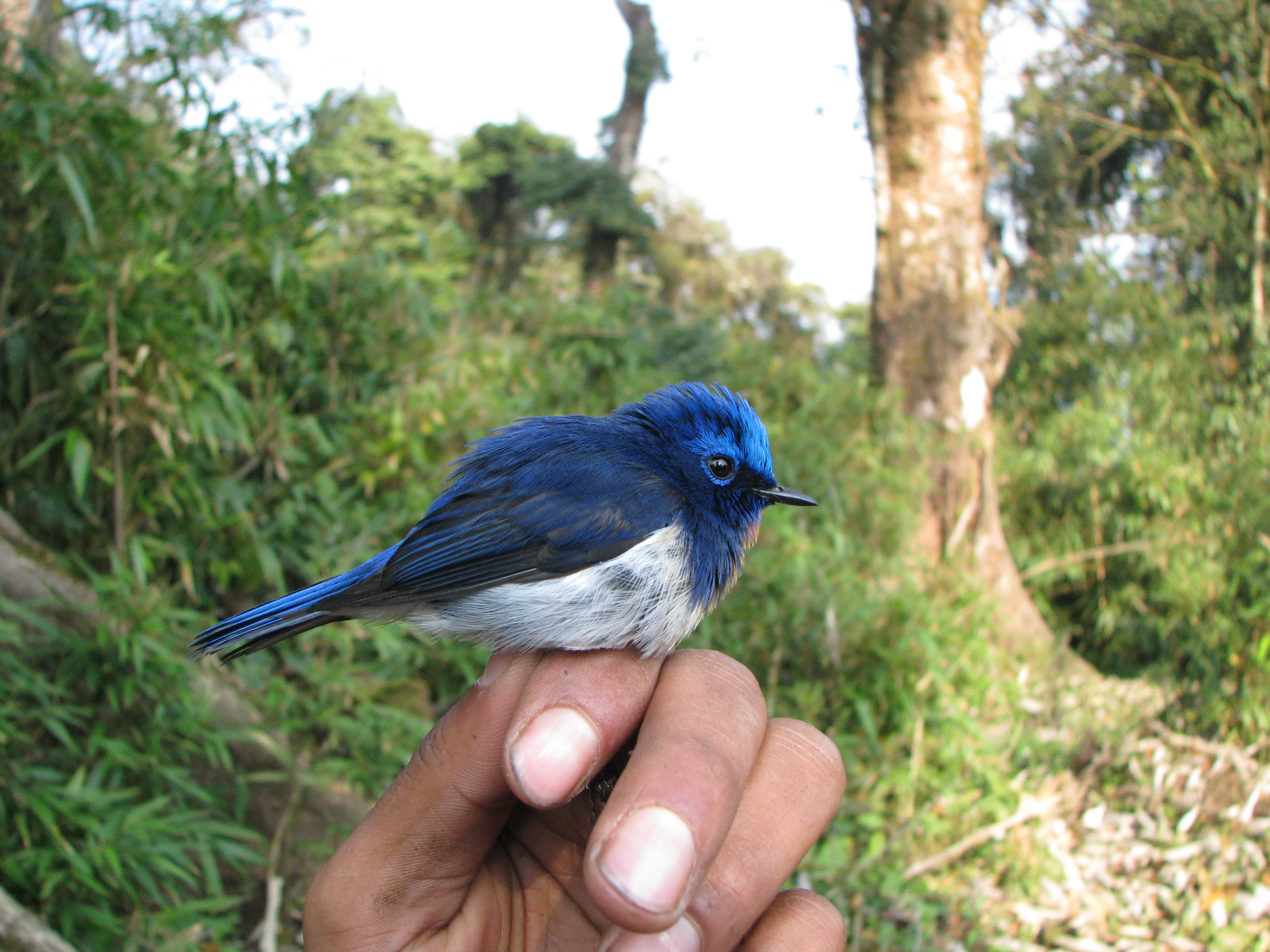
- A male sapphire flycatcher

Conservation status
- Least Concern (IUCN 3.1)

Scientific classification
- Kingdom: Animalia
- Phylum: Chordata
- Class: Aves
- Order: Passeriformes
- Family: Muscicapidae
- Genus: Ficedula
- Species: F. sapphira

Binomial name
- Ficedula sapphira (Blyth, 1843)

= Sapphire flycatcher =

Species of bird

The sapphire flycatcher (Ficedula sapphira) is a species of bird in the family Muscicapidae. It is found in Bangladesh, Bhutan, China, India, Laos, Myanmar, Nepal, Thailand, and Vietnam. Its natural habitat is subtropical or tropical moist montane forests.

== Gallery ==
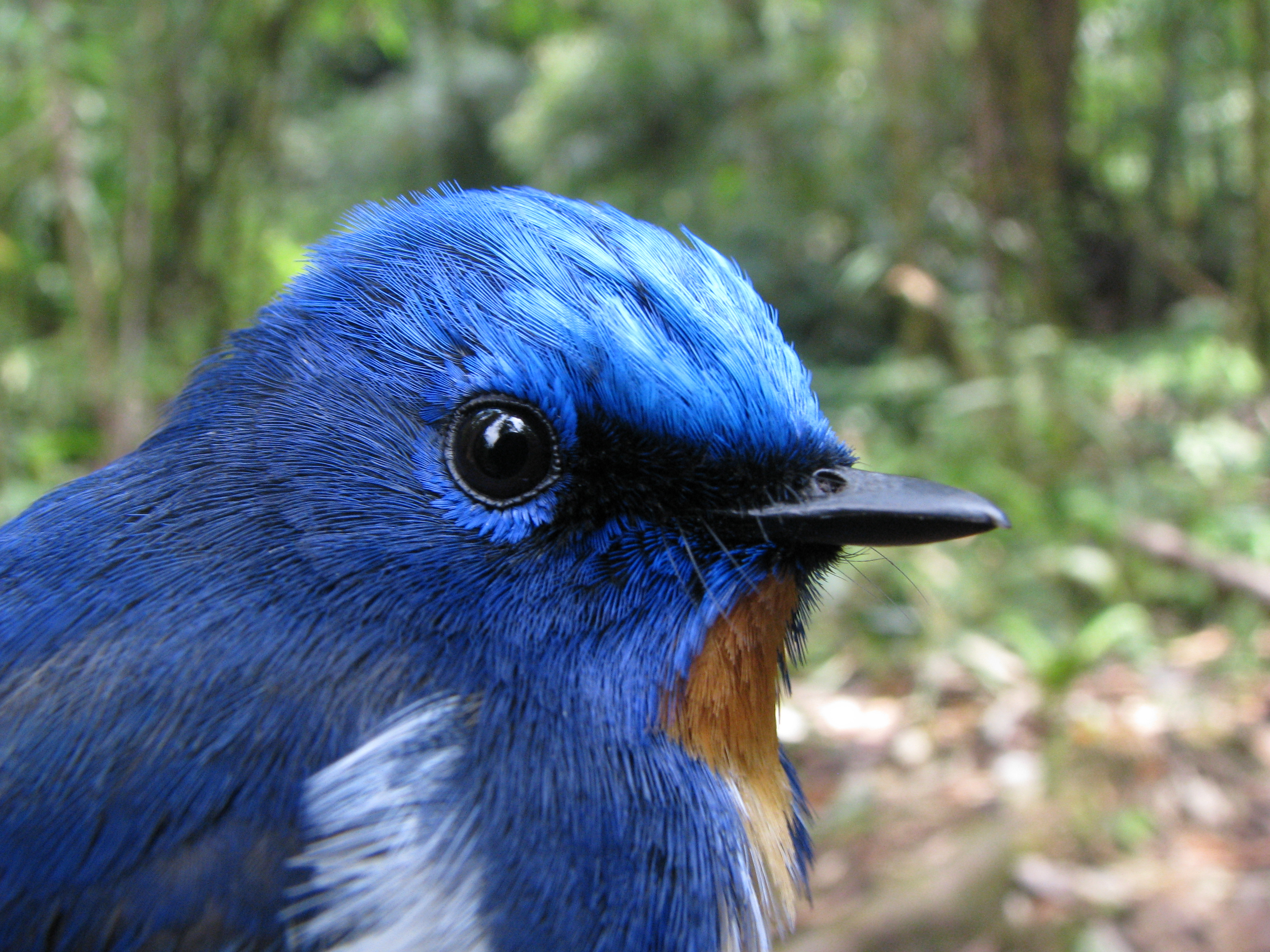
Close-up of a male's head. Note the red colouration on the throat

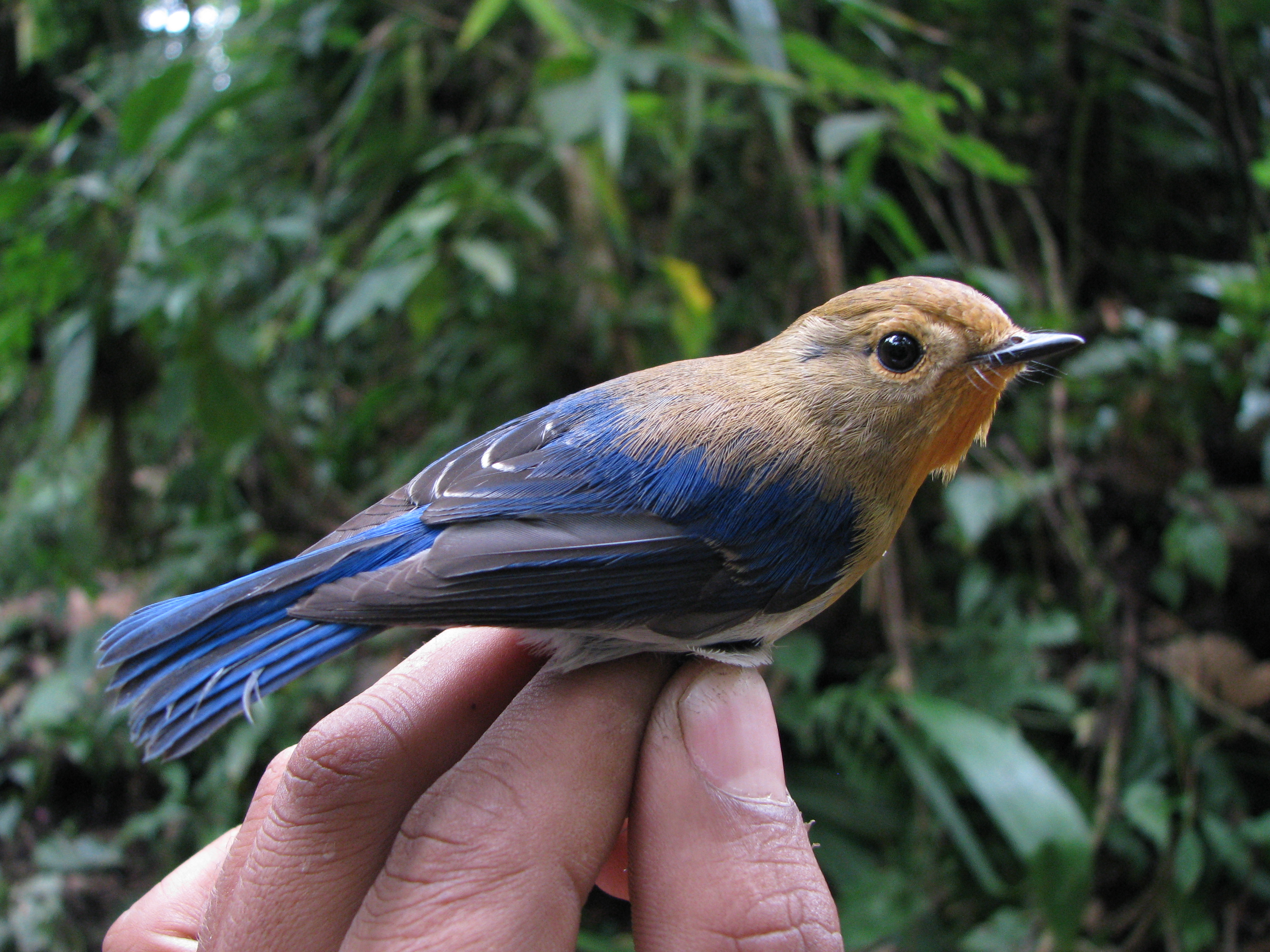
Juvenile male, Arunachal Pradesh, India

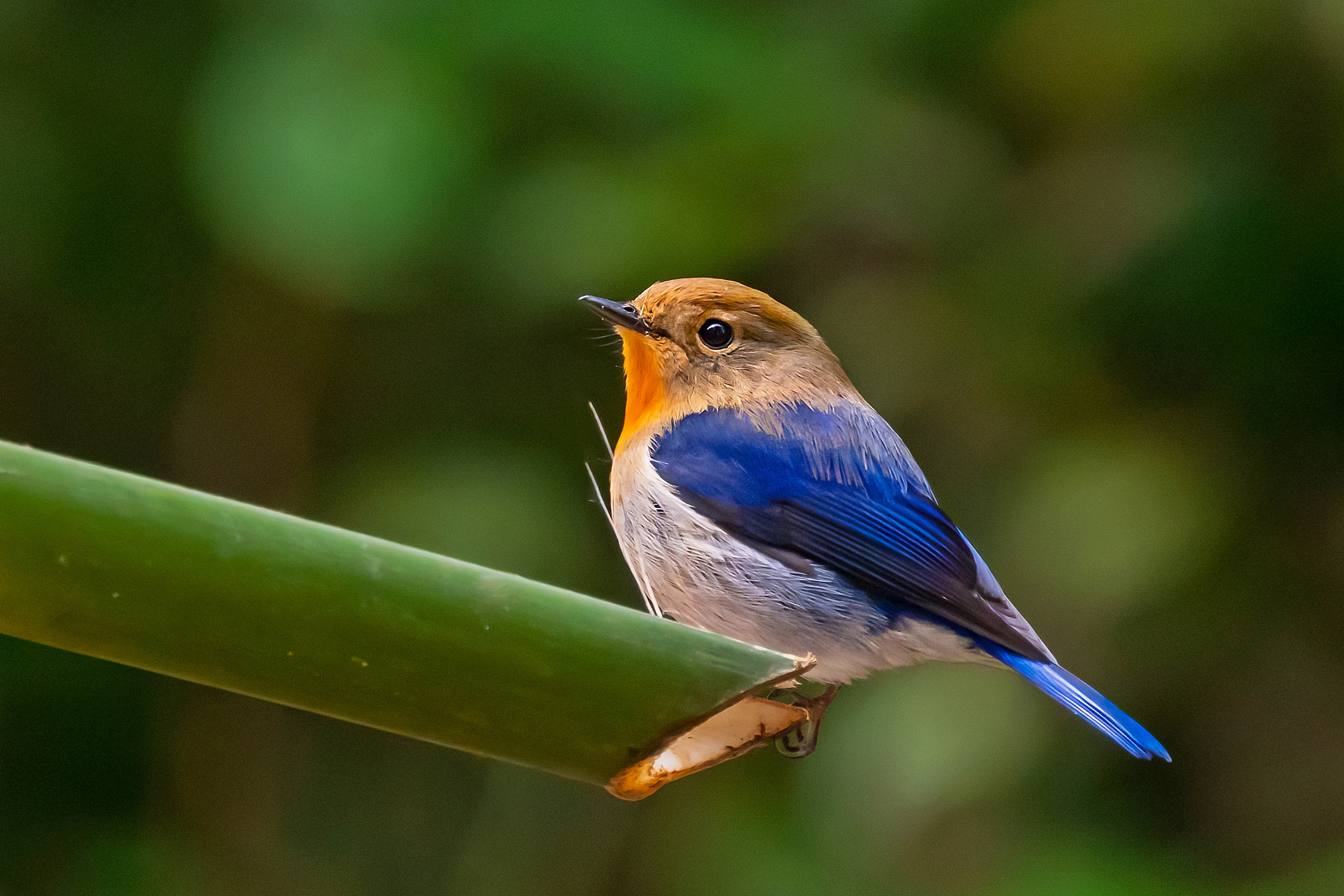
Sapphire flycatcher male in Latpanchar, Darjeeling, West Bengal, India
