= List of birds of Bhutan =

This is a list of the bird species recorded in Bhutan. The avifauna of Bhutan include a total of 760 species, of which one has been introduced by humans.

This list's taxonomic treatment (designation and sequence of orders, families and species) and nomenclature (common and scientific names) follow the conventions of The Clements Checklist of Birds of the World, 2022 edition. The family accounts at the beginning of each heading reflect this taxonomy, as do the species counts found in each family account. Introduced and accidental species are included in the total counts for Bhutan.

The following tags have been used to highlight several categories. The commonly occurring native species do not fall into any of these categories.

- (A) Accidental - a species that rarely or accidentally occurs in Bhutan
- (I) Introduced - a species introduced to Bhutan as a consequence, direct or indirect, of human actions

== Ducks, geese, and waterfowl ==
Order: Anseriformes Family: Anatidae

Anatidae includes the ducks and most duck-like waterfowl, such as geese and swans. These birds are adapted to an aquatic existence with webbed feet, flattened bills, and feathers that are excellent at shedding water due to an oily coating.

- Fulvous whistling-duck, Dendrocygna bicolor (A)
- Lesser whistling-duck, Dendrocygna javanica (A)
- Bar-headed goose, Anser indicus
- Graylag goose, Anser anser
- Greater white-fronted goose, Anser albifrons (A)
- Ruddy shelduck, Tadorna ferruginea
- Common shelduck, Tadorna tadorna
- Mandarin duck, Aix galericulata (A)
- Baikal teal, Sibirionetta formosa (A)
- Garganey, Spatula querquedula
- Northern shoveler, Spatula clypeata
- Gadwall, Mareca strepera
- Falcated duck, Mareca falcata (A)
- Eurasian wigeon, Mareca penelope
- Indian spot-billed duck, Anas poecilorhyncha
- Eastern spot-billed duck, Anas zonorhyncha (A)
- Mallard, Anas platyrhynchos
- Northern pintail, Anas acuta
- Green-winged teal, Anas crecca
- Red-crested pochard, Netta rufina
- Common pochard, Aythya ferina
- Ferruginous duck, Aythya nyroca
- Baer's pochard, Aythya baeri (A)
- Tufted duck, Aythya fuligula
- Greater scaup, Aythya marila (A)
- Common goldeneye, Bucephala clangula (A)
- Common merganser, Mergus merganser

== Pheasants, grouse, and allies ==
Order: Galliformes Family: Phasianidae

The Phasianidae are a family of terrestrial birds which consists of quails, partridges, snowcocks, francolins, spurfowls, tragopans, monals, pheasants, peafowls and jungle fowls. In general, they are plump (although they vary in size) and have broad, relatively short wings.

- Hill partridge, Arborophila torqueola
- Chestnut-breasted partridge, Arborophila mandellii
- Rufous-throated partridge, Arborophila rufogularis
- Indian peafowl, Pavo cristatus
- Gray peacock-pheasant, Polyplectron bicalcaratum
- Japanese quail, Coturnix japonica
- Common quail, Coturnix coturnix
- Tibetan snowcock, Tetraogallus tibetanus
- Black francolin, Francolinus francolinus
- Red junglefowl, Gallus gallus
- Blood pheasant, Ithaginis cruentus
- Himalayan monal, Lophophorus impejanus
- Snow partridge, Lerwa lerwa
- Satyr tragopan, Tragopan satyra
- Blyth's tragopan, Tragopan blythii
- Temminck's tragopan, Tragopan temminckii (A)
- Kalij pheasant, Lophura leucomelanos
- Tibetan partridge, Perdix hodgsoniae

== Grebes ==
Order: Podicipediformes Family: Podicipedidae

Grebes are small to medium-large freshwater diving birds. They have lobed toes and are excellent swimmers and divers. However, they have their feet placed far back on the body, making them quite ungainly on land.

- Little grebe, Tachybaptus ruficollis (A)
- Red-necked grebe, Podiceps grisegena (A)
- Great crested grebe, Podiceps cristatus
- Eared grebe, Podiceps nigricollis (A)

== Pigeons and doves ==
Order: Columbiformes Family: Columbidae

Pigeons and doves are stout-bodied birds with short necks and short slender bills with a fleshy cere.

- Rock pigeon, Columba livia
- Hill pigeon, Columba rupestris
- Snow pigeon, Columba leuconota
- Speckled wood-pigeon, Columba hodgsonii
- Ashy wood-pigeon, Columba pulchricollis
- Oriental turtle-dove, Streptopelia orientalis
- Eurasian collared-dove, Streptopelia decaocto
- Red collared-dove, Streptopelia tranquebarica
- Spotted dove, Streptopelia chinensis
- Laughing dove, Streptopelia senegalensis
- Barred cuckoo-dove, Macropygia unchall
- Asian emerald dove, Chalcophaps indica
- Orange-breasted green-pigeon, Treron bicincta
- Ashy-headed green-pigeon, Treron phayrei
- Thick-billed green-pigeon, Treron curvirostra
- Yellow-footed green-pigeon, Treron phoenicoptera
- Pin-tailed green-pigeon, Treron apicauda
- Wedge-tailed green-pigeon, Treron sphenura
- Green imperial-pigeon, Ducula aenea
- Mountain imperial-pigeon, Ducula badia

== Cuckoos ==
Order: Cuculiformes Family: Cuculidae

The family Cuculidae includes cuckoos, roadrunners and anis. These birds are of variable size with slender bodies, long tails and strong legs. The Old World cuckoos are brood parasites.

- Greater coucal, Centropus sinensis
- Lesser coucal, Centropus bengalensis
- Green-billed malkoha, Phaenicophaeus tristis
- Chestnut-winged cuckoo, Clamator coromandus
- Pied cuckoo, Clamator jacobinus (A)
- Asian koel, Eudynamys scolopacea
- Asian emerald cuckoo, Chrysococcyx maculatus
- Violet cuckoo, Chrysococcyx xanthorhynchus
- Banded bay cuckoo, Cacomantis sonneratii
- Plaintive cuckoo, Cacomantis merulinus
- Gray-bellied cuckoo, Cacomantis passerinus
- Fork-tailed drongo-cuckoo, Surniculus dicruroides
- Square-tailed drongo-cuckoo, Surniculus lugubris
- Large hawk-cuckoo, Hierococcyx sparverioides
- Common hawk-cuckoo, Hierococcyx varius
- Hodgson's hawk-cuckoo, Hierococcyx nisicolor
- Lesser cuckoo, Cuculus poliocephalus
- Indian cuckoo, Cuculus micropterus
- Himalayan cuckoo, Cuculus saturatus
- Common cuckoo, Cuculus canorus

== Frogmouths ==
Order: Caprimulgiformes Family: Podargidae

The frogmouths are a group of nocturnal birds related to the nightjars. They are named for their large flattened hooked bill and huge frog-like gape, which they use to take insects.

- Hodgson's frogmouth, Batrachostomus hodgsoni

== Nightjars and allies ==
Order: Caprimulgiformes Family: Caprimulgidae

Nightjars are medium-sized nocturnal birds that usually nest on the ground. They have long wings, short legs and very short bills. Most have small feet, of little use for walking, and long pointed wings. Their soft plumage is camouflaged to resemble bark or leaves.

- Gray nightjar, Caprimulgus indicus
- Large-tailed nightjar, Caprimulgus macrurus
- Savanna nightjar, Caprimulgus affinis

== Swifts ==
Order: Caprimulgiformes Family: Apodidae

Swifts are small birds which spend the majority of their lives flying. These birds have very short legs and never settle voluntarily on the ground, perching instead only on vertical surfaces. Many swifts have long swept-back wings which resemble a crescent or boomerang.

- White-rumped needletail, Zoonavena sylvatica (A)
- White-throated needletail, Hirundapus caudacutus
- Himalayan swiftlet, Aerodramus brevirostris
- Alpine swift, Apus melba
- Common swift, Apus apus (A)
- Plain swift, Apus unicolor (A)
- Pacific swift, Apus pacificus
- Salim Ali's swift, Apus salimalii (A)
- Blyth's swift, Apus leuconyx
- Dark-rumped swift, Apus acuticauda
- Little swift, Apus affinis (A)
- House swift, Apus nipalensis
- Asian palm-swift, Cypsiurus balasiensis

== Treeswifts ==
Order: Caprimulgiformes Family: Hemiprocnidae

The treeswifts, also called crested swifts, are closely related to the true swifts. They differ from the other swifts in that they have crests, long forked tails and softer plumage.

- Crested treeswift, Hemiprocne coronata

== Rails, gallinules, and coots ==
Order: Gruiformes Family: Rallidae

Rallidae is a large family of small to medium-sized birds which includes the rails, crakes, coots and gallinules. Typically they inhabit dense vegetation in damp environments near lakes, swamps or rivers. In general they are shy and secretive birds, making them difficult to observe. Most species have strong legs and long toes which are well adapted to soft uneven surfaces. They tend to have short, rounded wings and to be weak fliers.

- Slaty-breasted rail, Lewinia striata
- Eurasian moorhen, Gallinula chloropus (A)
- Eurasian coot, Fulica atra
- Gray-headed swamphen, Porphyrio poliocephalus (A)
- Watercock, Gallicrex cinerea (A)
- White-breasted waterhen, Amaurornis phoenicurus
- Slaty-legged crake, Rallina eurizonoides (A)
- Ruddy-breasted crake, Zapornia fusca
- Black-tailed crake, Zapornia bicolor

== Cranes ==
Order: Gruiformes Family: Gruidae

Cranes are large, long-legged and long-necked birds. Unlike the similar-looking but unrelated herons, cranes fly with necks outstretched, not pulled back. Most have elaborate and noisy courting displays or "dances".

- Demoiselle crane, Anthropoides virgo (A)
- Common crane, Grus grus (A)
- Hooded crane, Grus monacha (A)
- Black-necked crane, Grus nigricollis

== Thick-knees ==
Order: Charadriiformes Family: Burhinidae

The thick-knees are a group of largely tropical waders in the family Burhinidae. They are found worldwide within the tropical zone, with some species also breeding in temperate Europe and Australia. They are medium to large waders with strong black or yellow-black bills, large yellow eyes and cryptic plumage. Despite being classed as waders, most species have a preference for arid or semi-arid habitats.

- Indian thick-knee, Burhinus indicus
- Great thick-knee, Burhinus recurvirostris (A)

== Stilts and avocets ==
Order: Charadriiformes Family: Recurvirostridae

Recurvirostridae is a family of large wading birds, which includes the avocets and stilts. The avocets have long legs and long up-curved bills. The stilts have extremely long legs and long, thin, straight bills.

- Black-winged stilt, Himantopus himantopus
- Pied avocet, Recurvirostra avosetta

== Ibisbill ==
Order: Charadriiformes Family: Ibidorhynchidae

The ibisbill is related to the waders, but is sufficiently distinctive to be a family unto itself. The adult is grey with a white belly, red legs, a long down curved bill, and a black face and breast band.

- Ibisbill, Ibidorhyncha struthersii

== Plovers and lapwings ==
Order: Charadriiformes Family: Charadriidae

The family Charadriidae includes the plovers, dotterels and lapwings. They are small to medium-sized birds with compact bodies, short, thick necks and long, usually pointed, wings. They are found in open country worldwide, mostly in habitats near water.

- Pacific golden-plover, Pluvialis fulva (A)
- Northern lapwing, Vanellus vanellus
- River lapwing, Vanellus duvaucelii
- Yellow-wattled lapwing, Vanellus malabaricus (A)
- Gray-headed lapwing, Vanellus cinereus (A)
- Red-wattled lapwing, Vanellus indicus
- Lesser sand-plover, Charadrius mongolus (A)
- Kentish plover, Charadrius alexandrinus (A)
- Long-billed plover, Charadrius placidus
- Little ringed plover, Charadrius dubius

== Painted-snipes ==
Order: Charadriiformes Family: Rostratulidae

Painted-snipes are short-legged, long-billed birds similar in shape to the true snipes, but more brightly colored.

- Greater painted-snipe, Rostratula benghalensis (A)

== Jacanas ==
Order: Charadriiformes Family: Jacanidae

The jacanas are a group of tropical waders in the family Jacanidae. They are found throughout the tropics. They are identifiable by their huge feet and claws which enable them to walk on floating vegetation in the shallow lakes that are their preferred habitat.

- Pheasant-tailed jacana, Hydrophasianus chirurgus (A)
- Bronze-winged jacana, Metopidius indicus (A)

== Sandpipers and allies ==
Order: Charadriiformes Family: Scolopacidae

Scolopacidae is a large diverse family of small to medium-sized shorebirds including the sandpipers, curlews, godwits, shanks, tattlers, woodcocks, snipes, dowitchers and phalaropes. The majority of these species eat small invertebrates picked out of the mud or soil. Variation in length of legs and bills enables multiple species to feed in the same habitat, particularly on the coast, without direct competition for food.

- Whimbrel, Numenius phaeopus
- Eurasian curlew, Numenius arquata (A)
- Ruff, Calidris pugnax (A)
- Sharp-tailed sandpiper, Calidris acuminata (A)
- Curlew sandpiper, Calidris ferruginea (A)
- Temminck's stint, Calidris temminckii
- Little stint, Calidris minuta (A)
- Jack snipe, Lymnocryptes minimus (A)
- Eurasian woodcock, Scolopax rusticola
- Solitary snipe, Gallinago solitaria
- Wood snipe, Gallinago nemoricola
- Common snipe, Gallinago gallinago
- Pin-tailed snipe, Gallinago stenura
- Red-necked phalarope, Phalaropus lobatus (A)
- Common sandpiper, Actitis hypoleucos
- Green sandpiper, Tringa ochropus
- Spotted redshank, Tringa erythropus (A)
- Common greenshank, Tringa nebularia
- Wood sandpiper, Tringa glareola (A)
- Common redshank, Tringa totanus

== Buttonquail ==
Order: Charadriiformes Family: Turnicidae

The buttonquail are small, drab, running birds which resemble the true quails. The female is the brighter of the sexes and initiates courtship. The male incubates the eggs and tends the young.

- Yellow-legged buttonquail, Turnix tanki
- Barred buttonquail, Turnix suscitator

== Pratincoles and coursers ==
Order: Charadriiformes Family: Glareolidae

Glareolidae is a family of wading birds comprising the pratincoles, which have short legs, long pointed wings and long forked tails, and the coursers, which have long legs, short wings and long, pointed bills which curve downwards.

- Oriental pratincole, Glareola maldivarum (A)
- Small pratincole, Glareola lactea

== Gulls, terns, and skimmers ==
Order: Charadriiformes Family: Laridae

Laridae is a family of medium to large seabirds, the gulls, terns, and skimmers. Gulls are typically grey or white, often with black markings on the head or wings. They have stout, longish bills and webbed feet. Terns are a group of generally medium to large seabirds typically with grey or white plumage, often with black markings on the head. Most terns hunt fish by diving but some pick insects off the surface of fresh water. Terns are generally long-lived birds, with several species known to live in excess of 30 years.

- Slender-billed gull, Chroicocephalus genei (A)
- Black-headed gull, Chroicocephalus ridibundus (A)
- Brown-headed gull, Chroicocephalus brunnicephalus
- Pallas's gull, Ichthyaetus ichthyaetus
- Common gull, Larus canus (A)
- Lesser black-backed gull, Larus fuscus (A)
- Little tern, Sternula albifrons (A)
- Whiskered tern, Chlidonias hybrida (A)
- Common tern, Sterna hirundo (A)
- River tern, Sterna aurantia (A)

== Storks ==
Order: Ciconiiformes Family: Ciconiidae

Storks are large, long-legged, long-necked, wading birds with long, stout bills. Storks are mute, but bill-clattering is an important mode of communication at the nest. Their nests can be large and may be reused for many years.

- Asian openbill, Anastomus oscitans (A)
- Black stork, Ciconia nigra
- Asian woolly-necked stork, Ciconia episcopus
- Black-necked stork, Ephippiorhynchus asiaticus (A)
- Lesser adjutant, Leptoptilos javanicus (A)
- Greater adjutant, Leptoptilos dubius (A)

== Cormorants and shags ==
Order: Suliformes Family: Phalacrocoracidae

Phalacrocoracidae is a family of medium to large coastal, fish-eating seabirds that includes cormorants and shags. Plumage colouration varies, with the majority having mainly dark plumage, some species being black-and-white and a few being colourful.

- Little cormorant, Microcarbo niger
- Great cormorant, Phalacrocorax carbo
- Indian cormorant, Phalacrocorax fuscicollis (A)

== Herons, egrets, and bitterns ==
Order: Pelecaniformes Family: Ardeidae

The family Ardeidae contains the bitterns, herons, and egrets. Herons and egrets are medium to large wading birds with long necks and legs. Bitterns tend to be shorter necked and more wary. Members of Ardeidae fly with their necks retracted, unlike other long-necked birds such as storks, ibises and spoonbills.

- Cinnamon bittern, Ixobrychus cinnamomeus (A)
- Gray heron, Ardea cinerea
- White-bellied heron, Ardea insignis
- Great egret, Ardea alba
- Intermediate egret, Ardea intermedia
- Little egret, Egretta garzetta
- Cattle egret, Bubulcus ibis
- Indian pond-heron, Ardeola grayii
- Chinese pond-heron, Ardeola bacchus (A)
- Striated heron, Butorides striata
- Black-crowned night-heron, Nycticorax nycticorax
- Malayan night-heron, Gorsachius melanolophus (A)

== Ibises and spoonbills ==
Order: Pelecaniformes Family: Threskiornithidae

Threskiornithidae is a family of large terrestrial and wading birds which includes the ibises and spoonbills. They have long, broad wings with 11 primary and about 20 secondary feathers. They are strong fliers and despite their size and weight, very capable soarers.

- Red-naped ibis, Pseudibis papillosa (A)
- Black-headed ibis, Threskiornis melanocephalus
- Eurasian spoonbill, Platalea leucorodia

== Osprey ==
Order: Accipitriformes Family: Pandionidae

The family Pandionidae contains only one species, the osprey. The osprey is a medium-large raptor which is a specialist fish-eater with a worldwide distribution.

- Osprey, Pandion haliaetus

== Hawks, eagles, and kites ==
Order: Accipitriformes Family: Accipitridae

Accipitridae is a family of birds of prey, which includes hawks, eagles, kites, harriers and Old World vultures. These birds have powerful hooked beaks for tearing flesh from their prey, strong legs, powerful talons and keen eyesight.

- Black-winged kite, Elanus caeruleus (A)
- Bearded vulture, Gypaetus barbatus
- Egyptian vulture, Neophron percnopterus
- Oriental honey-buzzard, Pernis ptilorhynchus
- Jerdon's baza, Aviceda jerdoni (A)
- Black baza, Aviceda leuphotes (A)
- Red-headed vulture, Sarcogyps calvus
- Cinereous vulture, Aegypius monachus (A)
- White-rumped vulture, Gyps bengalensis
- Himalayan griffon, Gyps himalayensis
- Eurasian griffon, Gyps fulvus (A)
- Crested serpent-eagle, Spilornis cheela
- Short-toed snake-eagle, Circaetus gallicus (A)
- Mountain hawk-eagle, Nisaetus nipalensis
- Changeable hawk-eagle, Nisaetus cirrhatus (A)
- Rufous-bellied eagle, Lophotriorchis kienerii
- Black eagle, Ictinaetus malaiensis
- Greater spotted eagle, Clanga clanga
- Booted eagle, Hieraaetus pennatus
- Steppe eagle, Aquila nipalensis
- Imperial eagle, Aquila heliaca (A)
- Golden eagle, Aquila chrysaetos
- Bonelli's eagle, Aquila fasciata
- Eurasian marsh-harrier, Circus aeruginosus (A)
- Hen harrier, Circus cyaneus
- Pied harrier, Circus melanoleucos (A)
- Crested goshawk, Accipiter trivirgatus
- Shikra, Accipiter badius
- Besra, Accipiter virgatus
- Eurasian sparrowhawk, Accipiter nisus
- Northern goshawk, Accipiter gentilis
- Black kite, Milvus migrans
- Brahminy kite, Haliastur indus
- White-tailed eagle, Haliaeetus albicilla
- Pallas's fish-eagle, Haliaeetus leucoryphus
- Lesser fish-eagle, Haliaeetus humilis
- Common buzzard, Buteo buteo
- Himalayan buzzard, Buteo burmanicus
- Eastern buzzard, Buteo japonicus (A)
- Long-legged buzzard, Buteo rufinus
- Upland buzzard, Buteo hemilasius

== Barn-owls ==
Order: Strigiformes Family: Tytonidae

Barn-owls are medium to large owls with large heads and characteristic heart-shaped faces. They have long strong legs with powerful talons.

- Eastern barn owl, Tyto javanica (A)
- Oriental bay-owl, Phodilus badius (A)

== Owls ==
Order: Strigiformes Family: Strigidae

The typical owls are small to large solitary nocturnal birds of prey. They have large forward-facing eyes and ears, a hawk-like beak and a conspicuous circle of feathers around each eye called a facial disk.

- Mountain scops-owl, Otus spilocephalus
- Collared scops-owl, Otus lettia
- Oriental scops-owl, Otus sunia
- Eurasian eagle-owl, Bubo bubo (A)
- Spot-bellied eagle-owl, Bubo nipalensis
- Brown fish-owl, Ketupa zeylonensis (A)
- Tawny fish-owl, Ketupa flavipes
- Collared owlet, Taenioptynx brodiei
- Asian barred owlet, Glaucidium cuculoides
- Jungle owlet, Glaucidium radiatum
- Spotted owlet, Athene brama
- Little owl, Athene noctua (A)
- Brown wood-owl, Strix leptogrammica
- Tawny owl, Strix aluco
- Himalayan owl, Strix nivicolum
- Long-eared owl, Asio otus (A)
- Short-eared owl, Asio flammeus (A)
- Boreal owl, Aegolius funereus (A)
- Brown boobook, Ninox scutulata

== Trogons ==
Order: Trogoniformes Family: Trogonidae

The family Trogonidae includes trogons and quetzals. Found in tropical woodlands worldwide, they feed on insects and fruit, and their broad bills and weak legs reflect their diet and arboreal habits. Although their flight is fast, they are reluctant to fly any distance. Trogons have soft, often colourful, feathers with distinctive male and female plumage.

- Red-headed trogon, Harpactes erythrocephalus
- Ward's trogon, Harpactes wardi

== Hoopoes ==
Order: Bucerotiformes Family: Upupidae

Hoopoes have black, white and orangey-pink colouring with a large erectile crest on their head.

- Eurasian hoopoe, Upupa epops

== Hornbills ==
Order: Bucerotiformes Family: Bucerotidae

Hornbills are a group of birds whose bill is shaped like a cow's horn, but without a twist, sometimes with a casque on the upper mandible. Frequently, the bill is brightly coloured.

- Great hornbill, Buceros bicornis
- Indian grey hornbill, Ocyceros birostris (A)
- Oriental pied-hornbill, Anthracoceros albirostris
- Rufous-necked hornbill, Aceros nipalensis
- Wreathed hornbill, Rhyticeros undulatus

== Kingfishers ==
Order: Coraciiformes Family: Alcedinidae

Kingfishers are medium-sized birds with large heads, long, pointed bills, short legs and stubby tails.

- Blyth's kingfisher, Alcedo hercules
- Common kingfisher, Alcedo atthis
- Black-backed dwarf-kingfisher, Ceyx erithaca
- Stork-billed kingfisher, Pelargopsis capensis
- Ruddy kingfisher, Halcyon coromanda
- White-throated kingfisher, Halcyon smyrnensis
- Black-capped kingfisher, Halcyon pileata (A)
- Crested kingfisher, Megaceryle lugubris
- Pied kingfisher, Ceryle rudis

== Bee-eaters ==
Order: Coraciiformes Family: Meropidae

The bee-eaters are a group of near passerine birds in the family Meropidae. Most species are found in Africa but others occur in southern Europe, Madagascar, Australia and New Guinea. They are characterised by richly coloured plumage, slender bodies and usually elongated central tail feathers. All are colourful and have long downturned bills and pointed wings, which give them a swallow-like appearance when seen from afar.

- Blue-bearded bee-eater, Nyctyornis athertoni
- Asian green bee-eater, Merops orientalis
- Blue-tailed bee-eater, Merops philippinus (A)
- Chestnut-headed bee-eater, Merops leschenaulti

== Rollers ==
Order: Coraciiformes Family: Coraciidae

Rollers resemble crows in size and build, but are more closely related to the kingfishers and bee-eaters. They share the colourful appearance of those groups with blues and browns predominating. The two inner front toes are connected, but the outer toe is not.

- Indian roller, Coracias benghalensis
- Indochinese roller, Coracias affinis
- Dollarbird, Eurystomus orientalis

== Asian barbets ==
Order: Piciformes Family: Megalaimidae

The Asian barbets are plump birds, with short necks and large heads. They get their name from the bristles which fringe their heavy bills. Most species are brightly coloured.

- Coppersmith barbet, Psilopogon haemacephalus
- Blue-eared barbet, Psilopogon duvaucelii
- Great barbet, Psilopogon virens
- Lineated barbet, Psilopogon lineatus
- Golden-throated barbet, Psilopogon franklinii
- Blue-throated barbet, Psilopogon asiaticus

== Honeyguides ==
Order: Piciformes Family: Indicatoridae

Honeyguides are among the few birds that feed on wax. They are named for the greater honeyguide which leads traditional honey-hunters to bees' nests and, after the hunters have harvested the honey, feeds on the remaining contents of the hive.

- Yellow-rumped honeyguide, Indicator xanthonotus

== Woodpeckers ==
Order: Piciformes Family: Picidae

Woodpeckers are small to medium-sized birds with chisel-like beaks, short legs, stiff tails and long tongues used for capturing insects. Some species have feet with two toes pointing forward and two backward, while several species have only three toes. Many woodpeckers have the habit of tapping noisily on tree trunks with their beaks.

- Eurasian wryneck, Jynx torquilla
- Speckled piculet, Picumnus innominatus
- White-browed piculet, Sasia ochracea
- Brown-capped pygmy woodpecker, Yungipicus nanus (A)
- Gray-capped pygmy woodpecker, Yungipicus canicapillus
- Rufous-bellied woodpecker, Dendrocopos hyperythrus
- Fulvous-breasted woodpecker, Dendrocopos macei
- Stripe-breasted woodpecker, Dendrocopos atratus
- Darjeeling woodpecker, Dendrocopos darjellensis
- Crimson-breasted woodpecker, Dryobates cathpharius
- Bay woodpecker, Blythipicus pyrrhotis
- Greater flameback, Chrysocolaptes lucidus
- Rufous woodpecker, Micropternus brachyurus
- Pale-headed woodpecker, Gecinulus grantia
- Himalayan flameback, Dinopium shorii
- Black-rumped flameback, Dinopium benghalense (A)
- Lesser yellownape, Picus chlorolophus
- Streak-throated woodpecker, Picus xanthopygaeus
- Gray-headed woodpecker, Picus canus
- Greater yellownape, Chrysophlegma flavinucha
- Great slaty woodpecker, Mulleripicus pulverulentus

== Falcons and caracaras ==
Order: Falconiformes Family: Falconidae

Falconidae is a family of diurnal birds of prey. They differ from hawks, eagles and kites in that they kill with their beaks instead of their talons.

- Collared falconet, Microhierax caerulescens
- Pied falconet, Microhierax melanoleucus
- Eurasian kestrel, Falco tinnunculus
- Red-necked falcon, Falco chicquera (A)
- Amur falcon, Falco amurensis
- Merlin, Falco columbarius (A)
- Eurasian hobby, Falco subbuteo
- Oriental hobby, Falco severus
- Peregrine falcon, Falco peregrinus

== Old world parrots ==
Order: Psittaciformes Family: Psittaculidae

Characteristic features of parrots include a strong curved bill, an upright stance, strong legs, and clawed zygodactyl feet. Many parrots are vividly coloured, and some are multi-coloured. In size they range from 8 cm (3.1 in) to 1 m (3.3 ft) in length. Old World parrots are found from Africa east across south and southeast Asia and Oceania to Australia and New Zealand.

- Alexandrine parakeet, Psittacula eupatria
- Rose-ringed parakeet, Psittacula krameri (I)
- Slaty-headed parakeet, Psittacula himalayana
- Gray-headed parakeet, Psittacula finschii (A)
- Plum-headed parakeet, Psittacula cyanocephala (A)
- Blossom-headed parakeet, Psittacula roseata
- Red-breasted parakeet, Psittacula alexandri

== Asian and Grauer's broadbills ==
Order: Passeriformes Family: Eurylaimidae

The broadbills are small, brightly coloured birds, which feed on fruit and also take insects in flycatcher fashion, snapping their broad bills. Their habitat is canopies of wet forests.

- Long-tailed broadbill, Psarisomus dalhousiae
- Silver-breasted broadbill, Serilophus lunatus

== Pittas ==
Order: Passeriformes Family: Pittidae

Pittas are medium-sized by passerine standards and are stocky, with fairly long, strong legs, short tails and stout bills. Many are brightly coloured. They spend the majority of their time on wet forest floors, eating snails, insects and similar invertebrates.

- Blue-naped pitta, Hydrornis nipalensis
- Indian pitta, Pitta brachyura (A)
- Hooded pitta, Pitta sordida

== Cuckooshrikes ==
Order: Passeriformes Family: Campephagidae

The cuckooshrikes are small to medium-sized passerine birds. They are predominantly greyish with white and black, although some species are brightly coloured.

- Small minivet, Pericrocotus cinnamomeus
- Gray-chinned minivet, Pericrocotus solaris
- Short-billed minivet, Pericrocotus brevirostris
- Long-tailed minivet, Pericrocotus ethologus
- Scarlet minivet, Pericrocotus flammeus
- Rosy minivet, Pericrocotus roseus
- Large cuckooshrike, Coracina macei
- Black-winged cuckooshrike, Lalage melaschistos
- Black-headed cuckooshrike, Lalage melanoptera (A)

== Vireos, shrike-babblers, and erpornis ==
Order: Passeriformes Family: Vireonidae

Most of the members of this family are found in the New World. However, the shrike-babblers and erpornis, which only slightly resemble the "true" vireos and greenlets, are found in South East Asia.

- Black-headed shrike-babbler, Pteruthius rufiventer
- White-browed shrike-babbler, Pteruthius aeralatus
- Green shrike-babbler, Pteruthius xanthochlorus
- Black-eared shrike-babbler, Pteruthius melanotis
- White-bellied erpornis, Erpornis zantholeuca

== Old World orioles ==
Order: Passeriformes Family: Oriolidae

The Old World orioles are colourful passerine birds. They are not related to the New World orioles.

- Indian golden oriole, Oriolus kundoo
- Black-naped oriole, Oriolus chinensis (A)
- Slender-billed oriole, Oriolus tenuirostris
- Black-hooded oriole, Oriolus xanthornus
- Maroon oriole, Oriolus traillii

== Woodswallows, bellmagpies, and allies ==
Order: Passeriformes Family: Artamidae

The woodswallows are soft-plumaged, somber-coloured passerine birds. They are smooth, agile flyers with moderately large, semi-triangular wings.

- Ashy woodswallow, Artamus fuscus

== Vangas, helmetshrikes, and allies ==
Order: Passeriformes Family: Vangidae

The family Vangidae is highly variable, though most members of it resemble true shrikes to some degree.

- Large woodshrike, Tephrodornis virgatus
- Common woodshrike, Tephrodornis pondicerianus
- Bar-winged flycatcher-shrike, Hemipus picatus

== Ioras ==
Order: Passeriformes Family: Aegithinidae

The ioras are bulbul-like birds of open forest or thorn scrub, but whereas that group tends to be drab in colouration, ioras are sexually dimorphic, with the males being brightly plumaged in yellows and greens.

- Common iora, Aegithina tiphia

== Fantails ==
Order: Passeriformes Family: Rhipiduridae

The fantails are small insectivorous birds which are specialist aerial feeders.

- White-throated fantail, Rhipidura albicollis

== Drongos ==
Order: Passeriformes Family: Dicruridae

The drongos are mostly black or dark grey in colour, sometimes with metallic tints. They have long forked tails, and some Asian species have elaborate tail decorations. They have short legs and sit very upright when perched, like a shrike. They flycatch or take prey from the ground.

- Black drongo, Dicrurus macrocercus
- Ashy drongo, Dicrurus leucophaeus
- Crow-billed drongo, Dicrurus annectens
- Bronzed drongo, Dicrurus aeneus
- Lesser racket-tailed drongo, Dicrurus remifer
- Hair-crested drongo, Dicrurus hottentottus
- Greater racket-tailed drongo, Dicrurus paradiseus

== Monarch flycatchers ==
Order: Passeriformes Family: Monarchidae

The monarch flycatchers are small to medium-sized insectivorous passerines which hunt by flycatching.

- Black-naped monarch, Hypothymis azurea
- Blyth's paradise-flycatcher, Terpsiphone affinis
- Indian paradise-flycatcher, Terpsiphone paradisi

== Shrikes ==
Order: Passeriformes Family: Laniidae

Shrikes are passerine birds known for their habit of catching other birds and small animals and impaling the uneaten portions of their bodies on thorns. A typical shrike's beak is hooked, like a bird of prey.

- Tiger shrike, Lanius tigrinus (A)
- Brown shrike, Lanius cristatus
- Bay-backed shrike, Lanius vittatus (A)
- Long-tailed shrike, Lanius schach
- Gray-backed shrike, Lanius tephronotus

== Crows, jays, and magpies ==
Order: Passeriformes Family: Corvidae

The family Corvidae includes crows, ravens, jays, choughs, magpies, treepies, nutcrackers and ground jays. Corvids are above average in size among the Passeriformes, and some of the larger species show high levels of intelligence.

- Eurasian jay, Garrulus glandarius
- Yellow-billed blue-magpie, Urocissa flavirostris
- Common green-magpie, Cissa chinensis
- Rufous treepie, Dendrocitta vagabunda
- Gray treepie, Dendrocitta formosae
- Collared treepie, Dendrocitta frontalis
- Black-rumped magpie, Pica bottanensis
- Oriental magpie, Pica serica
- Eurasian nutcracker, Nucifraga caryocatactes
- Red-billed chough, Pyrrhocorax pyrrhocorax
- Yellow-billed chough, Pyrrhocorax graculus
- House crow, Corvus splendens
- Large-billed crow, Corvus macrorhynchos
- Common raven, Corvus corax

== Fairy flycatchers ==
Order: Passeriformes Family: Stenostiridae

Most of the species of this small family are found in Africa, though a few inhabit tropical Asia. They are not closely related to other birds called "flycatchers".

- Yellow-bellied fantail, Chelidorhynx hypoxanthus
- Gray-headed canary-flycatcher, Culicicapa ceylonensis

== Tits, chickadees, and titmice ==
Order: Passeriformes Family: Paridae

The Paridae are mainly small stocky woodland species with short stout bills. Some have crests. They are adaptable birds, with a mixed diet including seeds and insects.

- Fire-capped tit, Cephalopyrus flammiceps
- Yellow-browed tit, Sylviparus modestus
- Sultan tit, Melanochlora sultanea
- Coal tit, Periparus ater
- Rufous-vented tit, Periparus rubidiventris
- Gray-crested tit, Lophophanes dichrous
- Green-backed tit, Parus monticolus
- Cinereous tit, Parus cinereus
- Japanese tit, Parus minor
- Yellow-cheeked tit, Parus spilonotus

== Larks ==
Order: Passeriformes Family: Alaudidae

Larks are small terrestrial birds with often extravagant songs and display flights. Most larks are fairly dull in appearance. Their food is insects and seeds.

- Bengal bushlark, Mirafra assamica
- Horned lark, Eremophila alpestris (A)
- Greater short-toed lark, Calandrella brachydactyla (A)
- Hume's lark, Calandrella acutirostris (A)
- Sand lark, Alaudala raytal
- Oriental skylark, Alauda gulgula

== Cisticolas and allies ==
Order: Passeriformes Family: Cisticolidae

The Cisticolidae are warblers found mainly in warmer southern regions of the Old World. They are generally very small birds of drab brown or grey appearance found in open country such as grassland or scrub.

- Common tailorbird, Orthotomus sutorius
- Himalayan prinia, Prinia crinigera
- Black-throated prinia, Prinia atrogularis
- Gray-crowned prinia, Prinia cinereocapilla
- Rufescent prinia, Prinia rufescens
- Gray-breasted prinia, Prinia hodgsonii
- Jungle prinia, Prinia sylvatica
- Yellow-bellied prinia, Prinia flaviventris
- Ashy prinia, Prinia socialis
- Plain prinia, Prinia inornata

== Reed warblers and allies ==
Order: Passeriformes Family: Acrocephalidae

The members of this family are usually rather large for "warblers". Most are rather plain olivaceous brown above with much yellow to beige below. They are usually found in open woodland, reedbeds, or tall grass. The family occurs mostly in southern to western Eurasia and surroundings, but it also ranges far into the Pacific, with some species in Africa.

- Thick-billed warbler, Arundinax aedon
- Booted warbler, Iduna caligata (A)
- Blyth's reed warbler, Acrocephalus dumetorum
- Clamorous reed warbler, Acrocephalus stentoreus

== Grassbirds and allies ==
Order: Passeriformes Family: Locustellidae

Locustellidae are a family of small insectivorous songbirds found mainly in Eurasia, Africa, and the Australian region. They are smallish birds with tails that are usually long and pointed, and tend to be drab brownish or buffy all over.

- Striated grassbird, Megalurus palustris (A)
- Brown bush warbler, Locustella luteoventris
- Spotted bush warbler, Locustella thoracica
- Russet bush warbler, Locustella mandelli (A)

== Cupwings ==
Order: Passeriformes Family: Pnoepygidae

The members of this small family are found in mountainous parts of South and South East Asia.

- Scaly-breasted cupwing, Pnoepyga albiventer
- Pygmy cupwing, Pnoepyga pusilla

== Swallows ==
Order: Passeriformes Family: Hirundinidae

The family Hirundinidae is adapted to aerial feeding. They have a slender streamlined body, long pointed wings and a short bill with a wide gape. The feet are adapted to perching rather than walking, and the front toes are partially joined at the base.

- Gray-throated martin, Riparia chinensis
- Bank swallow, Riparia riparia
- Pale sand martin, Riparia diluta
- Eurasian crag-martin, Ptyonoprogne rupestris
- Barn swallow, Hirundo rustica
- Red-rumped swallow, Cecropis daurica
- Asian house-martin, Delichon dasypus
- Nepal house-martin, Delichon nipalensis

== Bulbuls ==
Order: Passeriformes Family: Pycnonotidae

Bulbuls are medium-sized songbirds. Some are colourful with yellow, red or orange vents, cheeks, throats or supercilia, but most are drab, with uniform olive-brown to black plumage. Some species have distinct crests.

- Black-crested bulbul, Rubigula flaviventris
- Striated bulbul, Pycnonotus striatus
- Red-vented bulbul, Pycnonotus cafer
- Red-whiskered bulbul, Pycnonotus jocosus
- Himalayan bulbul, Pycnonotus leucogenys
- White-throated bulbul, Alophoixus flaveolus
- Black bulbul, Hypsipetes leucocephalus
- Ashy bulbul, Hemixos flavala
- Mountain bulbul, Ixos mcclellandii

== Leaf warblers ==
Order: Passeriformes Family: Phylloscopidae

Leaf warblers are a family of small insectivorous birds found mostly in Eurasia and ranging into Wallacea and Africa. The species are of various sizes, often green-plumaged above and yellow below, or more subdued with greyish-green to greyish-brown colours.

- Ashy-throated warbler, Phylloscopus maculipennis
- Buff-barred warbler, Phylloscopus pulcher
- Yellow-browed warbler, Phylloscopus inornatus
- Hume's warbler, Phylloscopus humei
- Lemon-rumped warbler, Phylloscopus proregulus
- Tickell's leaf warbler, Phylloscopus affinis
- Dusky warbler, Phylloscopus fuscatus
- Smoky warbler, Phylloscopus fuligiventer
- Common chiffchaff, Phylloscopus collybita (A)
- White-spectacled warbler, Phylloscopus affinis
- Gray-cheeked warbler, Phylloscopus poliogenys
- Green-crowned warbler, Phylloscopus burkii
- Whistler's warbler, Phylloscopus whistleri
- Greenish warbler, Phylloscopus trochiloides
- Large-billed leaf warbler, Phylloscopus magnirostris
- Chestnut-crowned warbler, Phylloscopus castaniceps
- Yellow-vented warbler, Phylloscopus cantator
- Blyth's leaf warbler, Phylloscopus reguloides
- Gray-hooded warbler, Phylloscopus xanthoschistos

== Bush warblers and allies ==
Order: Passeriformes Family: Scotocercidae

The members of this family are found throughout Africa, Asia, and Polynesia. Their taxonomy is in flux, and some authorities place some genera in other families.

- Pale-footed bush warbler, Urosphena pallidipes
- Gray-bellied tesia, Tesia cyaniventer
- Slaty-bellied tesia, Tesia olivea
- Chestnut-crowned bush warbler, Cettia major
- Gray-sided bush warbler, Cettia brunnifrons
- Chestnut-headed tesia, Cettia castaneocoronata
- Yellow-bellied warbler, Abroscopus superciliaris
- Rufous-faced warbler, Abroscopus albogularis
- Black-faced warbler, Abroscopus schisticeps
- Mountain tailorbird, Phyllergates cuculatus
- Broad-billed warbler, Tickellia hodgsoni
- Brown-flanked bush warbler, Horornis fortipes
- Hume's bush warbler, Horornis brunnescens
- Aberrant bush warbler, Horornis flavolivacea

== Long-tailed tits ==
Order: Passeriformes Family: Aegithalidae

Long-tailed tits are a group of small passerine birds with medium to long tails. They make woven bag nests in trees. Most eat a mixed diet which includes insects.

- White-browed tit-warbler, Leptopoecile sophiae (A)
- Black-throated tit, Aegithalos concinnus
- Black-browed tit, Aegithalos iouschistos

== Sylviid warblers, parrotbills, and allies ==
Order: Passeriformes Family: Sylviidae

The family Sylviidae is a group of small insectivorous passerine birds. They mainly occur as breeding species, as the common name implies, in Europe, Asia and, to a lesser extent, Africa. Most are of generally undistinguished appearance, but many have distinctive songs.

- Lesser whitethroat, Curruca curruca
- Fire-tailed myzornis, Myzornis pyrrhoura
- Golden-breasted fulvetta, Lioparus chrysotis
- Jerdon's babbler, Chrysomma altirostre
- Brown-throated fulvetta, Fulvetta ludlowi
- White-browed fulvetta, Fulvetta vinipectus
- Great parrotbill, Conostoma aemodium
- Brown parrotbill, Cholornis unicolor
- Gray-headed parrotbill, Psittiparus gularis
- White-breasted parrotbill, Psittiparus ruficeps
- Pale-billed parrotbill, Chleuasicus atrosuperciliaris
- Fulvous parrotbill, Suthora fulvifrons
- Black-throated parrotbill, Suthora nipalensis

== White-eyes, yuhinas, and allies ==
Order: Passeriformes Family: Zosteropidae

The white-eyes are small and mostly undistinguished, their plumage above being generally some dull color like greenish-olive, but some species have a white or bright yellow throat, breast or lower parts, and several have buff flanks. As their name suggests, many species have a white ring around each eye.

- Striated yuhina, Staphida castaniceps
- White-naped yuhina, Yuhina bakeri
- Whiskered yuhina, Yuhina flavicollis
- Stripe-throated yuhina, Yuhina gularis
- Rufous-vented yuhina, Yuhina occipitalis
- Black-chinned yuhina, Yuhina nigrimenta
- Indian white-eye, Zosterops palpebrosus

== Tree-babblers, scimitar-babblers, and allies ==
Order: Passeriformes Family: Timaliidae

The babblers, or timaliids, are somewhat diverse in size and colouration, but are characterised by soft fluffy plumage.

- Chestnut-capped babbler, Timalia pileata (A)
- Pin-striped tit-babbler, Mixornis gularis
- Golden babbler, Cyanoderma chrysaeum
- Rufous-capped babbler, Cyanoderma ruficeps
- Buff-chested babbler, Cyanoderma ambiguum
- Rufous-throated wren-babbler, Spelaeornis caudatus
- Bar-winged wren-babbler, Spelaeornis troglodytoides
- Coral-billed scimitar-babbler, Pomatorhinus ferruginosus
- Slender-billed scimitar-babbler, Pomatorhinus superciliaris
- Streak-breasted scimitar-babbler, Pomatorhinus ruficollis
- White-browed scimitar-babbler, Pomatorhinus schisticeps
- Rusty-cheeked scimitar-babbler, Erythrogenys erythrogenys
- Spot-breasted scimitar-babbler, Erythrogenys erythrocnemis
- Gray-throated babbler, Stachyris nigriceps
- Sikkim wedge-billed babbler, Stachyris humei

== Ground babblers and allies ==
Order: Passeriformes Family: Pellorneidae

These small to medium-sized songbirds have soft fluffy plumage but are otherwise rather diverse. Members of the genus Illadopsis are found in forests, but some other genera are birds of scrublands.

- White-hooded babbler, Gampsorhynchus rufulus
- Yellow-throated fulvetta, Schoeniparus cinereus
- Rufous-winged fulvetta, Schoeniparus castaneceps
- Rufous-throated fulvetta, Schoeniparus rufogularis
- Rusty-capped fulvetta, Schoeniparus dubius
- Puff-throated babbler, Pellorneum ruficeps
- Spot-throated babbler, Pellorneum albiventre
- Buff-breasted babbler, Pellorneum tickelli (A)
- Eyebrowed wren-babbler, Napothera epilepidota
- Long-billed wren-babbler, Napothera malacoptila
- Abbott's babbler, Malacocincla abbotti
- Indian grassbird, Graminicola bengalensis

== Laughingthrushes and allies ==
Order: Passeriformes Family: Leiothrichidae

The members of this family are diverse in size and colouration, though those of genus Turdoides tend to be brown or greyish. The family is found in Africa, India, and southeast Asia.

- Nepal fulvetta, Alcippe nipalensis
- Striated laughingthrush, Grammatoptila striata
- Himalayan cutia, Cutia nipalensis
- Jungle babbler, Argya striata
- White-crested laughingthrush, Garrulax leucolophus
- Lesser necklaced laughingthrush, Garrulax monileger
- Rufous-chinned laughingthrush, Ianthocincla rufogularis
- Spotted laughingthrush, Ianthocincla ocellata
- Greater necklaced laughingthrush, Pterorhinus pectoralis
- White-throated laughingthrush, Pterorhinus albogularis
- Rufous-necked laughingthrush, Pterorhinus ruficollis
- Rufous-vented laughingthrush, Pterorhinus gularis
- Gray-sided laughingthrush, Pterorhinus caerulatus
- Bhutan laughingthrush, Trochalopteron imbricatum
- Scaly laughingthrush, Trochalopteron subunicolor
- Blue-winged laughingthrush, Trochalopteron squamatus
- Black-faced laughingthrush, Trochalopteron affinis
- Chestnut-crowned laughingthrush, Trochalopteron erythrocephalus
- Rufous sibia, Heterophasia capistrata
- Beautiful sibia, Heterophasia pulchella (A)
- Long-tailed sibia, Heterophasia picaoides
- Silver-eared mesia, Leiothrix argentauris
- Red-billed leiothrix, Leiothrix lutea
- Red-tailed minla, Minla ignotincta
- Rufous-backed sibia, Leioptila annectens
- Red-faced liocichla, Liocichla phoenicea
- Hoary-throated barwing, Actinodura nipalensis
- Rusty-fronted barwing, Actinodura egertoni
- Blue-winged minla, Actinodura cyanouroptera
- Chestnut-tailed minla, Actinodura strigula

== Kinglets ==
Order: Passeriformes Family: Regulidae

The kinglets, also called crests, are a small group of birds often included in the Old World warblers, but frequently given family status because they also resemble the titmice.

- Goldcrest, Regulus regulus

== Wallcreeper ==
Order: Passeriformes Family: Tichodromidae

The wallcreeper is a small bird related to the nuthatch family, which has stunning crimson, grey and black plumage.

- Wallcreeper, Tichodroma muraria

== Nuthatches ==
Order: Passeriformes Family: Sittidae

Nuthatches are small woodland birds. They have the unusual ability to climb down trees head first, unlike other birds which can only go upwards. Nuthatches have big heads, short tails and powerful bills and feet.

- Chestnut-bellied nuthatch, Sitta castanea
- White-tailed nuthatch, Sitta himalayensis
- Velvet-fronted nuthatch, Sitta frontalis
- Beautiful nuthatch, Sitta formosa

== Treecreepers ==
Order: Passeriformes Family: Certhiidae

Treecreepers are small woodland birds, brown above and white below. They have thin pointed down-curved bills, which they use to extricate insects from bark. They have stiff tail feathers, like woodpeckers, which they use to support themselves on vertical trees.

- Hodgson's treecreeper, Certhia hodgsoni
- Bar-tailed treecreeper, Certhia himalayana (A)
- Rusty-flanked treecreeper, Certhia nipalensis
- Sikkim treecreeper, Certhia discolor

== Wrens ==
Order: Passeriformes Family: Troglodytidae

The wrens are mainly small and inconspicuous except for their loud songs. These birds have short wings and thin down-turned bills. Several species often hold their tails upright. All are insectivorous.

- Eurasian wren, Troglodytes troglodytes

== Spotted elachura ==
Order: Passeriformes Family: Elachuridae

This species, the only one in its family, inhabits forest undergrowth throughout South East Asia.

- Spotted elachura, Elachura formosa

== Dippers ==
Order: Passeriformes Family: Cinclidae

Dippers are a group of perching birds whose habitat includes aquatic environments in the Americas, Europe and Asia. They are named for their bobbing or dipping movements.

- White-throated dipper, Cinclus cinclus
- Brown dipper, Cinclus pallasii

== Starlings ==
Order: Passeriformes Family: Sturnidae

Starlings are small to medium-sized passerine birds. Their flight is strong and direct and they are very gregarious. Their preferred habitat is fairly open country. They eat insects and fruit. Plumage is typically dark with a metallic sheen.

- Golden-crested myna, Ampeliceps coronatus (A)
- Common hill myna, Gracula religiosa
- European starling, Sturnus vulgaris (A)
- Rosy starling, Pastor roseus (A)
- Indian pied starling, Gracupica contra
- Brahminy starling, Sturnia pagodarum (A)
- Chestnut-tailed starling, Sturnia malabarica
- White-cheeked starling, Spodiopsar cineraceus (A)
- Common myna, Acridotheres tristis
- Bank myna, Acridotheres ginginianus
- Jungle myna, Acridotheres fuscus
- Spot-winged starling, Saroglossa spilopterus

== Thrushes and allies ==
Order: Passeriformes Family: Turdidae

The thrushes are a group of passerine birds that occur mainly in the Old World. They are plump, soft plumaged, small to medium-sized insectivores or sometimes omnivores, often feeding on the ground. Many have attractive songs.

- Grandala, Grandala coelicolor
- Long-tailed thrush, Zoothera dixoni
- Alpine thrush, Zoothera mollissima
- Himalayan thrush, Zoothera salimalii
- Long-billed thrush, Zoothera monticola
- Scaly thrush, Zoothera dauma
- Purple cochoa, Cochoa purpurea
- Green cochoa, Cochoa viridis
- Pied thrush, Geokichla wardii (A)
- Orange-headed thrush, Geokichla citrina
- Eurasian blackbird, Turdus merula
- Gray-winged blackbird, Turdus boulboul
- Indian blackbird, Turdus simillimus
- Tickell's thrush, Turdus unicolor
- Black-breasted thrush, Turdus dissimilis (A)
- Eyebrowed thrush, Turdus obscurus
- White-backed thrush, Turdus kessleri
- Tibetan blackbird, Turdus maximus
- White-collared blackbird, Turdus albocinctus
- Chestnut thrush, Turdus rubrocanus
- Black-throated thrush, Turdus atrogularis
- Red-throated thrush, Turdus ruficollis
- Dusky thrush, Turdus eunomus (A)
- Naumann's thrush, Turdus naumanni (A)

== Old World flycatchers ==
Order: Passeriformes Family: Muscicapidae

Old World flycatchers are a large group of small passerine birds native to the Old World. They are mainly small arboreal insectivores. The appearance of these birds is highly varied, but they mostly have weak songs and harsh calls.

- Dark-sided flycatcher, Muscicapa sibirica
- Ferruginous flycatcher, Muscicapa ferruginea
- Asian brown flycatcher, Muscicapa dauurica
- Brown-breasted flycatcher, Muscicapa muttui (A)
- Indian robin, Copsychus fulicatus
- Oriental magpie-robin, Copsychus saularis
- White-rumped shama, Copsychus malabaricus
- White-gorgeted flycatcher, Anthipes monileger
- Pale-chinned blue flycatcher, Cyornis poliogenys
- Pale blue flycatcher, Cyornis unicolor
- Blue-throated flycatcher, Cyornis rubeculoides
- Hill blue flycatcher, Cyornis whitei (A)
- Large niltava, Niltava grandis
- Small niltava, Niltava macgrigoriae
- Rufous-bellied niltava, Niltava sundara
- Vivid niltava, Niltava vivida (A)
- Verditer flycatcher, Eumyias thalassina
- Rusty-bellied shortwing, Brachypteryx hyperythra (A)
- Gould's shortwing, Brachypteryx stellata
- Lesser shortwing, Brachypteryx leucophrys
- Himalayan shortwing, Brachypteryx cruralis
- Indian blue robin, Larvivora brunnea
- White-bellied redstart, Luscinia phaenicuroides
- Bluethroat, Luscinia svecica (A)
- Blue whistling-thrush, Myophonus caeruleus
- Little forktail, Enicurus scouleri
- White-crowned forktail, Enicurus leschenaulti
- Spotted forktail, Enicurus maculatus
- Black-backed forktail, Enicurus immaculatus
- Slaty-backed forktail, Enicurus schistaceus
- Siberian rubythroat, Calliope calliope
- Himalayan rubythroat, Calliope pectoralis
- Chinese rubythroat, Calliope tschebaiewi
- White-tailed robin, Myiomela leucura
- Blue-fronted robin, Cinclidium frontale
- Himalayan bluetail, Tarsiger rufilatus
- Rufous-breasted bush-robin, Tarsiger hyperythrus
- White-browed bush-robin, Tarsiger indicus
- Golden bush-robin, Tarsiger chrysaeus
- Slaty-backed flycatcher, Ficedula hodgsonii
- Slaty-blue flycatcher, Ficedula tricolor
- Snowy-browed flycatcher, Ficedula hyperythra
- Pygmy flycatcher, Ficedula hodgsoni
- Rufous-gorgeted flycatcher, Ficedula strophiata
- Sapphire flycatcher, Ficedula sapphira
- Little pied flycatcher, Ficedula westermanni
- Ultramarine flycatcher, Ficedula superciliaris
- Rusty-tailed flycatcher, Ficedula ruficauda (A)
- Taiga flycatcher, Ficedula albicilla
- Kashmir flycatcher, Ficedula subrubra (A)
- Red-breasted flycatcher, Ficedula parva
- Blue-fronted redstart, Phoenicurus frontalis
- Plumbeous redstart, Phoenicurus fuliginosus
- White-capped redstart, Phoenicurus leucocephalus
- Blue-capped redstart, Phoenicurus caeruleocephalus
- Hodgson's redstart, Phoenicurus hodgsoni
- White-throated redstart, Phoenicurus schisticeps
- White-winged redstart, Phoenicurus erythrogastrus (A)
- Black redstart, Phoenicurus ochruros
- Daurian redstart, Phoenicurus auroreus
- Chestnut-bellied rock-thrush, Monticola rufiventris
- Blue-capped rock-thrush, Monticola cinclorhyncha
- Blue rock-thrush, Monticola solitarius
- White-throated bushchat, Saxicola insignis (A)
- Siberian stonechat, Saxicola maurus
- Amur stonechat, Saxicola stejnegeri (A)
- Pied bushchat, Saxicola caprata
- Gray bushchat, Saxicola ferreus
- Northern wheatear, Oenanthe oenanthe (A)
- Isabelline wheatear, Oenanthe isabellina (A)
- Desert wheatear, Oenanthe deserti (A)
- Pied wheatear, Oenanthe pleschanka (A)

== Flowerpeckers ==
Order: Passeriformes Family: Dicaeidae

The flowerpeckers are very small, stout, often brightly coloured birds, with short tails, short thick curved bills and tubular tongues.

- Thick-billed flowerpecker, Dicaeum agile
- Yellow-vented flowerpecker, Dicaeum chrysorrheum
- Yellow-bellied flowerpecker, Dicaeum melanozanthum
- Pale-billed flowerpecker, Dicaeum erythrorhynchos
- Plain flowerpecker, Dicaeum minullum
- Fire-breasted flowerpecker, Dicaeum ignipectus
- Scarlet-backed flowerpecker, Dicaeum cruentatum

== Sunbirds and spiderhunters ==
Order: Passeriformes Family: Nectariniidae

The sunbirds and spiderhunters are very small passerine birds which feed largely on nectar, although they will also take insects, especially when feeding young. Flight is fast and direct on their short wings. Most species can take nectar by hovering like a hummingbird, but usually perch to feed.

- Ruby-cheeked sunbird, Chalcoparia singalensis
- Purple sunbird, Cinnyris asiaticus
- Fire-tailed sunbird, Aethopyga ignicauda
- Black-throated sunbird, Aethopyga saturata
- Mrs. Gould's sunbird, Aethopyga gouldiae
- Green-tailed sunbird, Aethopyga nipalensis
- Crimson sunbird, Aethopyga siparaja
- Little spiderhunter, Arachnothera longirostra
- Streaked spiderhunter, Arachnothera magna

== Fairy-bluebirds ==
Order: Passeriformes Family: Irenidae

The fairy-bluebirds are bulbul-like birds of open forest or thorn scrub. The males are dark-blue and the females a duller green.

- Asian fairy-bluebird, Irena puella

== Leafbirds ==
Order: Passeriformes Family: Chloropseidae

The leafbirds are small, bulbul-like birds. The males are brightly plumaged, usually in greens and yellows.

- Golden-fronted leafbird, Chloropsis aurifrons
- Orange-bellied leafbird, Chloropsis hardwickii

== Weavers and allies ==
Order: Passeriformes Family: Ploceidae

The weavers are small passerine birds related to the finches. They are seed-eating birds with rounded conical bills. The males of many species are brightly coloured, usually in red or yellow and black, some species show variation in colour only in the breeding season.

- Streaked weaver, Ploceus manyar
- Baya weaver, Ploceus philippinus
- Finn's weaver, Ploceus megarhynchus
- Black-breasted weaver, Ploceus benghalensis

== Waxbills and allies ==
Order: Passeriformes Family: Estrildidae

The estrildid finches are small passerine birds of the Old World tropics and Australasia. They are gregarious and often colonial seed eaters with short thick but pointed bills. They are all similar in structure and habits, but have wide variation in plumage colours and patterns.

- White-rumped munia, Lonchura striata
- Scaly-breasted munia, Lonchura punctulata
- Pin-tailed parrotfinch, Erythrura prasina (A)

== Accentors ==
Order: Passeriformes Family: Prunellidae

The accentors are in the only bird family, Prunellidae, which is completely endemic to the Palearctic. They are small, fairly drab species superficially similar to sparrows.

- Alpine accentor, Prunella collaris
- Altai accentor, Prunella himalayana
- Robin accentor, Prunella rubeculoides
- Rufous-breasted accentor, Prunella strophiata
- Brown accentor, Prunella fulvescens (A)
- Maroon-backed accentor, Prunella immaculata

== Old World sparrows ==
Order: Passeriformes Family: Passeridae

Old World sparrows are small passerine birds. In general, sparrows tend to be small, plump, brown or grey birds with short tails and short powerful beaks. Sparrows are seed eaters, but they also consume small insects.

- House sparrow, Passer domesticus
- Russet sparrow, Passer cinnamomeus
- Eurasian tree sparrow, Passer montanus

== Wagtails and pipits ==
Order: Passeriformes Family: Motacillidae

Motacillidae is a family of small passerine birds with medium to long tails. They include the wagtails, longclaws and pipits. They are slender, ground feeding insectivores of open country.

- Forest wagtail, Dendronanthus indicus
- Gray wagtail, Motacilla cinerea
- Western yellow wagtail, Motacilla flava
- Eastern yellow wagtail, Motacilla tschutschensis
- Citrine wagtail, Motacilla citreola
- White-browed wagtail, Motacilla maderaspatensis
- White wagtail, Motacilla alba
- Richard's pipit, Anthus richardi
- Paddyfield pipit, Anthus rufulus
- Long-billed pipit, Anthus similis
- Blyth's pipit, Anthus godlewskii
- Tawny pipit, Anthus campestris (A)
- Rosy pipit, Anthus roseatus
- Tree pipit, Anthus trivialis (A)
- Olive-backed pipit, Anthus hodgsoni
- Red-throated pipit, Anthus cervinus (A)
- Water pipit, Anthus spinoletta (A)
- American pipit, Anthus rubescens (A)

== Finches, euphonias, and allies ==
Order: Passeriformes Family: Fringillidae

Finches are seed-eating passerine birds, that are small to moderately large and have a strong beak, usually conical and in some species very large. All have twelve tail feathers and nine primaries. These birds have a bouncing flight with alternating bouts of flapping and gliding on closed wings, and most sing well.

- Common chaffinch, Fringilla coelebs (A)
- Brambling, Fringilla montifringilla (A)
- Collared grosbeak, Mycerobas affinis
- Spot-winged grosbeak, Mycerobas melanozanthos
- White-winged grosbeak, Mycerobas carnipes
- Common rosefinch, Carpodacus erythrinus
- Scarlet finch, Carpodacus sipahi
- Himalayan beautiful rosefinch, Carpodacus pulcherrimus
- Dark-rumped rosefinch, Carpodacus edwardsii
- Pink-browed rosefinch, Carpodacus rhodochrous
- Streaked rosefinch, Carpodacus rubicilloides
- Red-fronted rosefinch, Carpodacus puniceus
- Crimson-browed finch, Carpodacus subhimachalus
- Himalayan white-browed rosefinch, Carpodacus thura
- Brown bullfinch, Pyrrhula nipalensis
- Red-headed bullfinch, Pyrrhula erythrocephala
- Gray-headed bullfinch, Pyrrhula erythaca
- Blanford's rosefinch, Agraphospiza rubescens
- Golden-naped finch, Pyrrhoplectes epauletta
- Spectacled finch, Callacanthis burtoni (A)
- Dark-breasted rosefinch, Procarduelis nipalensis
- Plain mountain finch, Leucosticte nemoricola
- Black-headed mountain finch, Leucosticte brandti
- Yellow-breasted greenfinch, Chloris spinoides
- Red crossbill, Loxia curvirostra
- Tibetan serin, Spinus thibetanus

== Longspurs and snow buntings ==
Order: Passeriformes Family: Calcariidae

The Calcariidae are a group of passerine birds which had been traditionally grouped with the New World sparrows, but differ in a number of respects and are usually found in open grassy areas.

- Lapland longspur, Calcarius lapponicus (A)

== Old World buntings ==
Order: Passeriformes Family: Emberizidae

The emberizids are a large family of passerine birds. They are seed-eating birds with distinctively shaped bills. Many emberizid species have distinctive head patterns.

- Crested bunting, Emberiza lathami
- Godlewski's bunting, Emberiza godlewskii (A)
- Gray-necked bunting, Emberiza buchanani (A)
- Little bunting, Emberiza pusilla
- Rustic bunting, Emberiza rustica (A)
- Black-faced bunting, Emberiza spodocephala (A)

== See also ==
- List of birds
- Lists of birds by region
