= E. C. Stuart Baker =

British ornithologist and police officer (1864–1944)

E. C. Stuart Baker CIE OBE FZS FLS
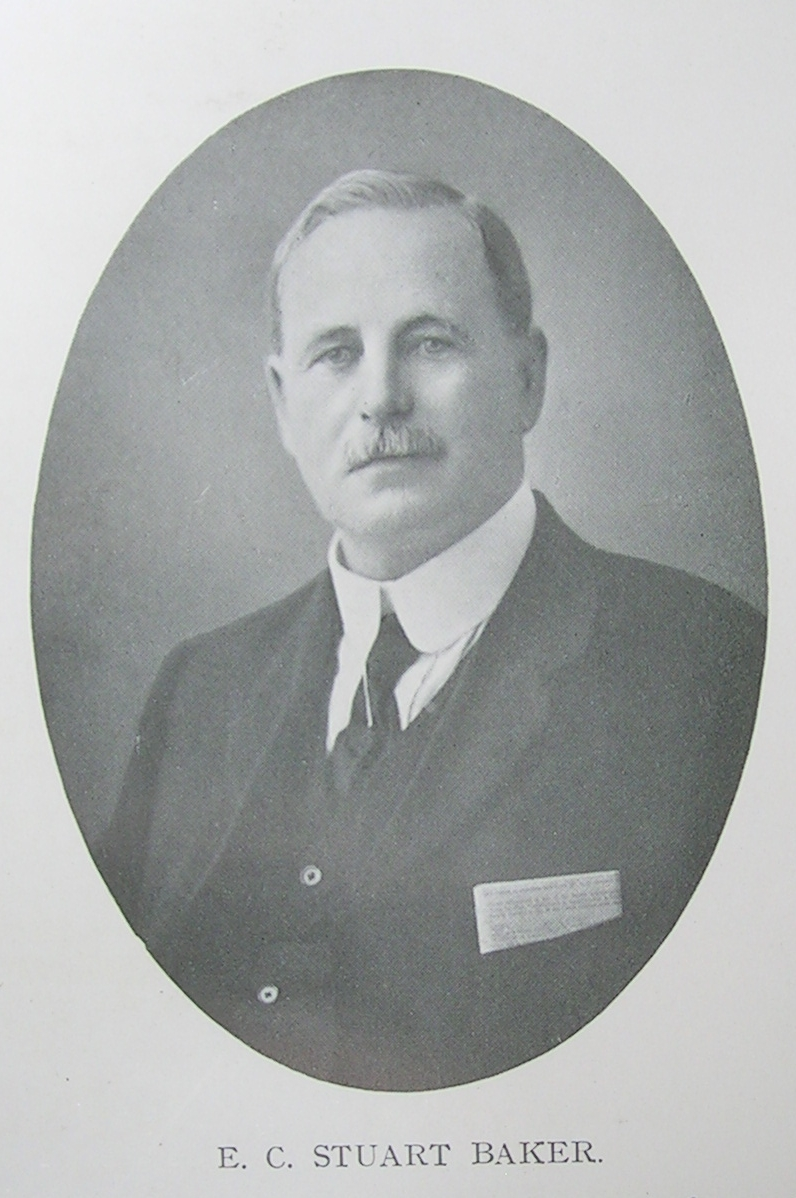

Chief Police Officer of the Port of London Police
- In office 1911–1925

Personal details
- Born: Edward Charles Stuart Baker; 1864
- Died: 16 April 1944 (aged 79–80)
- Occupation: Police officer, ornithologist

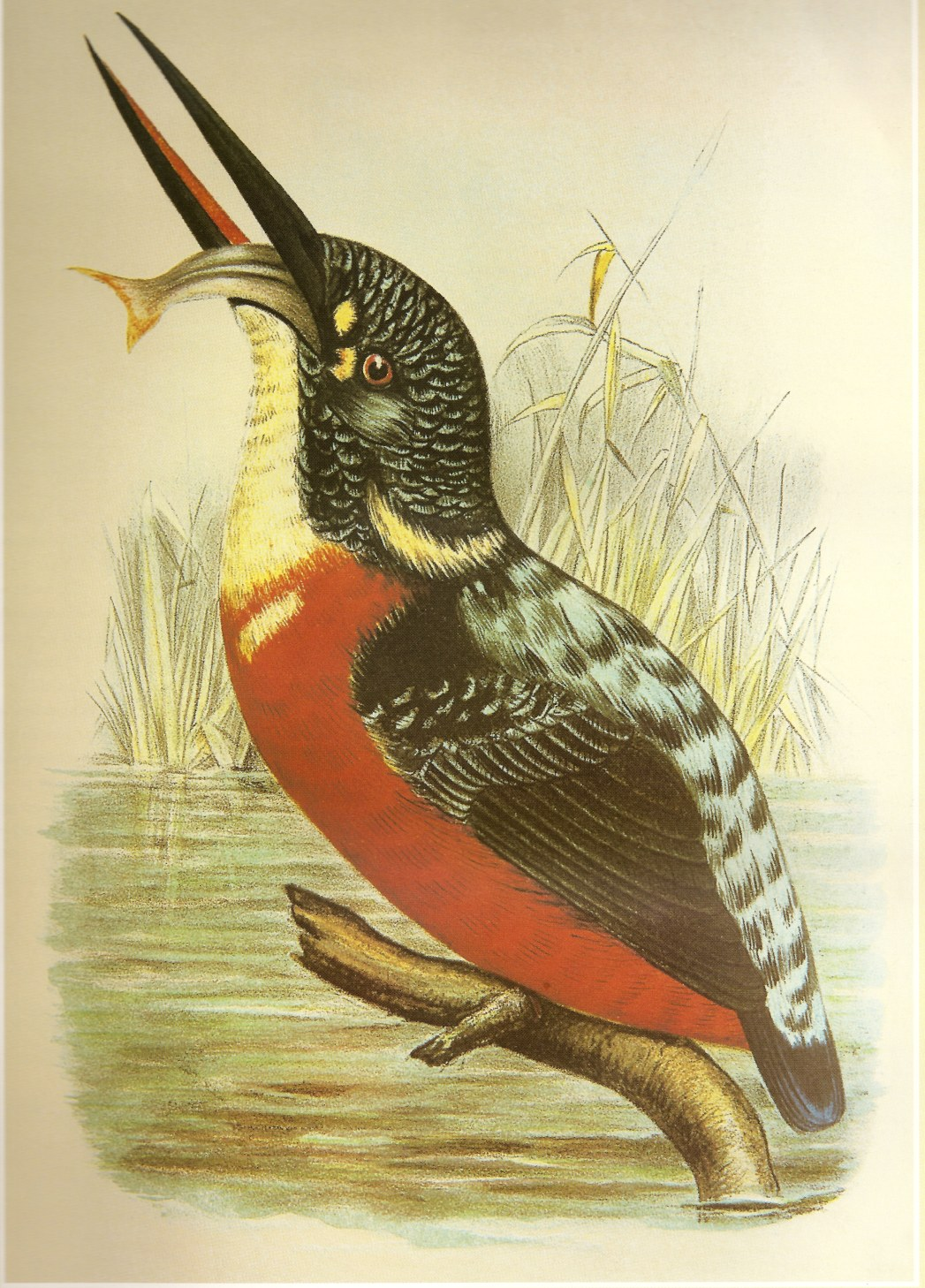
Blyth's kingfisher painted by Stuart-Baker

Edward Charles Stuart Baker CIE OBE FZS FLS (1864 – 16 April 1944) was a British ornithologist and police officer. He catalogued the birds of India and produced the second edition of the Fauna of British India which included the introduction of trinomial nomenclature.

== Life and career ==
Baker was educated at Trinity College, Stratford-upon-Avon and in 1883 followed his father into the Indian Police Service. He spent most of his career in India in the Assam Police, rising to the rank of Inspector-General commanding the force. In 1910 he was placed on Special Criminal Investigation duty. In 1911 he returned to England and took up the appointment of Chief Police Officer of the Port of London Police, remaining in this position until his retirement in 1925. For his services in this role during the First World War he was appointed Officer of the Order of the British Empire (OBE) in the 1920 civilian war honours. After retirement he became Mayor of Croydon.

He was a tennis player and a big game hunter. He lost his left arm in a panther attack in Silchar, Assam, and was tossed by a gaur and trampled by an Indian rhinoceros during various hunting expeditions.

== Ornithology ==
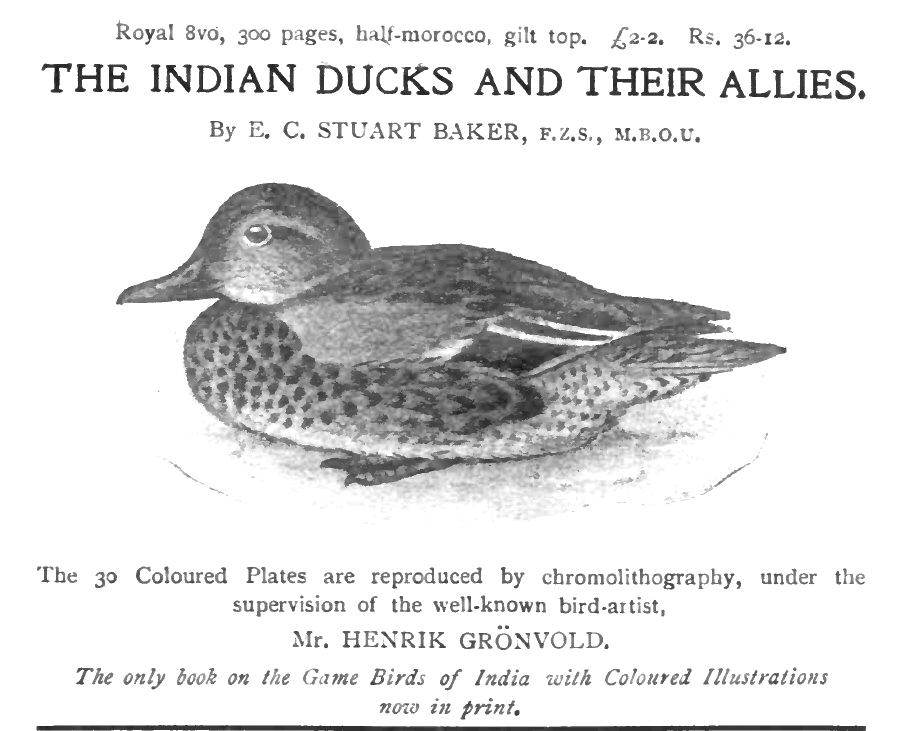
Advertisement for "The Indian Ducks and their Allies"

During his spare time he studied and collected the birds of India. His books included The Indian Ducks and their Allies (1908), Game Birds of India and Ceylon (1921), The Fauna of British India, Including Ceylon and Burma. Birds. (1922; eight volumes), Mishmi Man-eater (1928), The Nidification of the Birds of the Indian Empire (1932), and Cuckoo Problems (1942; the cuckoo was his chief interest in ornithology). He made a comprehensive collection of nearly 50,000 Indian birds' eggs, part of which he donated to the Natural History Museum, where he spent a lot of time working on the egg collections from India and Thailand. His eight-volume contribution to The Fauna of British India, Including Ceylon and Burma series became the standard reference work on the subject. Part of the collection, about 152 specimens were sold to the private museum of the Tzar Ferdinand I of Bulgaria. He also served on government advisory committees on the protection of birds and was from 1913 to 1936 honorary secretary and treasurer of the British Ornithologists' Union.

Apart from specimens that he collected or received from others both of eggs and birds, Baker also maintained a small menagerie for a time when he was posted in the North Cachar district. The animals in his collection included civets, bears, deer and crested serpent eagles, Amur falcons, falconets and woodpeckers.

Some of the nests and eggs in his collection have been considered as of dubious provenance and there are suggestions that he artificially made up some of the clutches. Some, like Charles Vaurie, have considered it so unreliable that they even suggested the destruction of his egg collection.

Baker's yuhina (Yuhina bakeri) was named in his honour.

== Publications ==
Baker's early publications were focussed on the North Cachar Hill district where he worked. He also collected eggs and published a catalogue of them. He also published some notes on species whose nesting had not been described by Allan Octavian Hume and sent these to the Ibis journal. He also described a new species, Elachura haplonota, which was collected by a Naga hunter for him, but this species had already been described by Godwin-Austen and Walden under the genus Pnoepyga chocolatina (it is now called Spelaeornis chocolatinus). His series on the bulbuls of the region included paintings made by him of the birds set in backgrounds having ornate plants from the region.

=== The Birds of North Cachar ===
- Baker, E. C. S. (1893). "The birds of North Cachar. A catalogue of the Passeriformes, Coraciiformes and the Order Psittacii of the Sub-class Ciconiiformes". Journal of the Bombay Natural History Society. 8 (2): 162–211.
- Baker, E. C. S. (1894). "The birds of North Cachar. Part II". Journal of the Bombay Natural History Society. 9 (1): 1–24.
- Baker, E. C. S. (1894). "The birds of North Cachar. Part III". Journal of the Bombay Natural History Society. 9 (2): 111–146.
- Baker, E. C. S. (1895). "The birds of North Cachar. Part IV". Journal of the Bombay Natural History Society. 10 (1): 1–12.
- Baker, E. C. S. (1896). "The birds of North Cachar. Part V." Journal of the Bombay Natural History Society. 10 (2): 161–168.
- Baker, E. C. S. (1896). "The birds of North Cachar. Part VI". Journal of the Bombay Natural History Society. 10 (3): 339–371.
- Baker, E. C. S. (1897). "The birds of North Cachar. Part VII". Journal of the Bombay Natural History Society. 10 (4): 539–567.
- Baker, E. C. S. (1897). "The birds of North Cachar. Part VIII". Journal of the Bombay Natural History Society. 11 (2): 222–233.
- Baker, E. C. S. (1898). "The birds of North Cachar. Part IX". Journal of the Bombay Natural History Society. 11 (3): 390–405.
- Baker, E. C. S. (1899). "The birds of North Cachar. Part X." Journal of the Bombay Natural History Society. 12(3: 486–510.
- Baker, E. C. S. (1901). "The birds of Cachar. [XI]". Journal of the Bombay Natural History Society. 13 (3): 399–405.
- Baker, E. C. S. (1901). "The birds of Cachar. [XII]". Journal of the Bombay Natural History Society. 13 (4): 563–570.

Bulbuls of North Cachar

- Baker, E. C. S. (1892). "The Bulbuls of North Cachar. Part I." Journal of the Bombay Natural History Society. 7 (1): 1–12.
- Baker, E. C. S. (1892). "The Bulbuls of North Cachar. Part II". Journal of the Bombay Natural History Society. 7 (2): 125–131.
- Baker, E. C. S. (1892). "The Bulbuls of North Cachar. Part III". Journal of the Bombay Natural History Society. 7 (1): 263–268.
- Baker, E. C. S. (1892). "The Bulbuls of North Cachar. Part IV". Journal of the Bombay Natural History Society. 7 (4): 413–424.
- Baker, E. C. S. (1893). "The Bulbuls of North Cachar. Part V." Journal of the Bombay Natural History Society. 8 (1): 1–16.
- Baker, E. C. S. (1892). "List of birds' eggs. Presented to the Society by Mr. E.C.S. Baker, of North Cachar, August 1892". Journal of the Bombay Natural History Society. 7 (3): 390.
- Baker, E. C. S. (1892). "List of birds' eggs of North Cachar". Journal of the Bombay Natural History Society. 7 (2): 251.

In some of his early writings he pointed out errors in the identification keys (for instance for the minivets) given by E.W. Oates in the Fauna of British India. This was followed by a more careful re-examination of specimens and he established himself as a careful taxonomist.

This period of publications was followed by a major series on the ducks of India. These were illustrated by plates made by J.G. Keulemans. This established him as an expert on the game birds.

- Baker, E. C. S. (1897). "Indian ducks and their allies. Part I." Journal of the Bombay Natural History Society. 11 (1): 01–21.
- Baker, E. C. S. (1897). "Indian ducks and their allies. Part II". Journal of the Bombay Natural History Society. 11 (2): 171–198.
- Baker, E. C. S. (1898). "Indian ducks and their allies. Part III". Journal of the Bombay Natural History Society. 11 (3): 347–367.
- Baker, E. C. S. (1898). "Indian ducks and their allies. Part IV". Journal of the Bombay Natural History Society. 11 (4): 555–584.
- Baker, E. C. S. (1898). "Indian ducks and their allies. Part V." Journal of the Bombay Natural History Society. 12 (1): 01–31.
- Baker, E. C. S. (1899). "Indian ducks and their allies. Part VI". Journal of the Bombay Natural History Society. 12 (2): 235–261.
- Baker, E. C. S. (1899). "Indian ducks and their allies. Part VII". Journal of the Bombay Natural History Society. 12 (3): 437–464.
- Baker, E. C. S. (1899). "Indian ducks and their allies. Part VIII". Journal of the Bombay Natural History Society. 12 (4): 593–620.
- Baker, E. C. S. (1900). "Indian ducks and their allies. Part IX". Journal of the Bombay Natural History Society. 13 (1): 01–24.
- Baker, E. C. S. (1900). "Indian ducks and their allies. Part X." Journal of the Bombay Natural History Society. 13 (2): 199–222.
- Baker, E. C. S. (1903). "Indian ducks and their allies". Journal of the Bombay Natural History Society. 14 (4): 660–665.

The work on ducks led to a further series on the waders and other game birds and this eventually led to a multi-volume book on game-birds. This series began in 1910 and ended in 1934. Along the way Baker also began to revise a list of the species found in India based on the work of Hartert for the Palearctic region. Baker introduced trinomials in his "hand-list".

- Baker, E. C. S. (1910). "The game birds of India, Burma and Ceylon". Journal of the Bombay Natural History Society. 20 (1): 1–32.
- Baker, E. C. S. (1910). "The game birds of India, Burma and Ceylon. Part 2". Journal of the Bombay Natural History Society. 20 (2): 259–278.
- Baker, E. C. S. (1911). "The game birds of India, Burma and Ceylon. Part 3". Journal of the Bombay Natural History Society. 20 (3): 547–596.
- Baker, E. C. S. (1911). "The game birds of India, Burma and Ceylon. Part 4". Journal of the Bombay Natural History Society. 20 (4): 901–929.
- Baker, E. C. S. (1911). "The game birds of India, Burma and Ceylon. Part 5". Journal of the Bombay Natural History Society. 21 (1): 20–47.
- Baker, E. C. S. (1912). "The game birds of India, Burma and Ceylon. Part 6". Journal of the Bombay Natural History Society. 21 (2): 303–337.
- Baker, E. C. S. (1912). "The game birds of India, Burma and Ceylon. Part 7". Journal of the Bombay Natural History Society. 21 (3): 721–739.
- Baker, E. C. S. (1912). "The game birds of India, Burma and Ceylon. Part 8". Journal of the Bombay Natural History Society. 21 (4): 1109–1128.
- Baker, E. C. S. (1913). "The game birds of India, Burma and Ceylon. Part 9". Journal of the Bombay Natural History Society. 22 (1): 1–12.
- Baker, E. C. S. (1913). "The game birds of India, Burma and Ceylon. Part 10". Journal of the Bombay Natural History Society. 22 (2): 219–229.
- Baker, E. C. S. (1913). "The game birds of India, Burma and Ceylon. Part 11". Journal of the Bombay Natural History Society. 22 (3): 427–433.
- Baker, E. C. S. (1914). "The game birds of India, Burma and Ceylon. Part 12". Journal of the Bombay Natural History Society. 22 (4): 653–657.
- Baker, E. C. S. (1914). "The game birds of India, Burma and Ceylon. Part 13". Journal of the Bombay Natural History Society. 23 (1): 1–22.
- Baker, E. C. S. (1914). "The game birds of India, Burma and Ceylon, part 14". Journal of the Bombay Natural History Society. 23 (2): 183–196.
- Baker, E. C. S. (1915). "The game birds of India, Burma and Ceylon, part 15". Journal of the Bombay Natural History Society. 23 (3): 385–412.
- Baker, E. C. S. (1915). "The game birds of India, Burma and Ceylon. Part 16". Journal of the Bombay Natural History Society. 23 (4): 593–606.
- Baker, E. C. S. (1915). "The game birds of India, Burma and Ceylon. Part 17". Journal of the Bombay Natural History Society. 24 (1): 1–28.
- Baker, E. C. S. (1916). "The game birds of India, Burma and Ceylon. Part 18". Journal of the Bombay Natural History Society. 24 (2): 201–223.
- Baker, E. C. S. (1916). "The game birds of India, Burma and Ceylon. Part 19". Journal of the Bombay Natural History Society. 24 (3): 387–403.
- Baker, E. C. S. (1916). "The game birds of India, Burma and Ceylon. Part 20". Journal of the Bombay Natural History Society. 24 (4): 623–638.
- Baker, E. C. S. (1917). "The game birds of India, Burma and Ceylon, part 21". Journal of the Bombay Natural History Society. 25 (1): 1–39.
- Baker, E. C. S. (1917). "The game birds of India, Burma and Ceylon. Part 22". Journal of the Bombay Natural History Society. 25 (2): 161–198.
- Baker, E. C. S. (1918). "The game birds of India, Burma and Ceylon. Part 23". Journal of the Bombay Natural History Society. 25 (3): 325–360.
- Baker, E. C. S. (1918). "The game birds of India, Burma and Ceylon. Part 24". Journal of the Bombay Natural History Society. 25 (4): 521–546.
- Baker, E. C. S. (1918). "The game birds of India, Burma and Ceylon. Part 25". Journal of the Bombay Natural History Society. 26 (1): 1–18.
- Baker, E. C. S. (1919). "The game birds of India, Burma and Ceylon. Part 26". Journal of the Bombay Natural History Society. 26 (2): 319–337.
- Baker, E. C. S. (1919). "The game birds of India, Burma and Ceylon, part 27". Journal of the Bombay Natural History Society. 26 (3): 705–715.
- Baker, E. C. S. (1920). "The game birds of India, Burma and Ceylon. Part 28". Journal of the Bombay Natural History Society. 26 (4): 885–906.
- Baker, E. C. S. (1920). "The game birds of India, Burma and Ceylon, Part 29". Journal of the Bombay Natural History Society. 27 (1): 1–24.
- Baker, E. C. S. (1920). "The game birds of India, Burma and Ceylon, Part 30". Journal of the Bombay Natural History Society. 27 (2): 193–210.
- Baker, E. C. S. (1921). "The game birds of India, Burma and Ceylon, Part 31". Journal of the Bombay Natural History Society. 27 (3): 417–430.
- Baker, E. C. S. (1921). "The game birds of India, Burma and Ceylon, Part 30". Journal of the Bombay Natural History Society. 27 (4): 651–664.
- Baker, E. C. S. (1921). "The game birds of India, Burma and Ceylon, part 30 (contd.)". Journal of the Bombay Natural History Society. 28 (1): 1–22.
- Baker, E. C. S. (1922). "The game birds of India, Burma and Ceylon, part 31". Journal of the Bombay Natural History Society. 28 (2): 305–312.
- Baker, E. C. S. (1922). "The game birds of India, Burma and Ceylon, part 32". Journal of the Bombay Natural History Society. 28 (3): 571–575.
- Baker, E. C. S. (1922). "The game birds of India, Burma and Ceylon, Part 33". Journal of the Bombay Natural History Society. 28 (4): 823–829.
- Baker, E. C. S. (1923). "The game birds of India, Burma and Ceylon. Part 34". Journal of the Bombay Natural History Society. 29 (1): 1–8.
- Baker, E. C. S. (1923). "The game birds of India, Burma and Ceylon. Part 35". Journal of the Bombay Natural History Society. 29 (2): 309–317.
- Baker, E. C. S. (1923). "The game birds of India, Burma and Ceylon. Part 36". Journal of the Bombay Natural History Society. 29(3: 577–597.
- Baker, E. C. S. (1924). "The game birds of India, Burma and Ceylon. Part 37". Journal of the Bombay Natural History Society. 29 (4): 849–863.
- Baker, E. C. S. (1924). "The game birds of India, Burma and Ceylon, part 38". Journal of the Bombay Natural History Society. 30 (1): 1–11.
- Baker, E. C. S. (1925). "The game birds of India, Burma and Ceylon, part 39". Journal of the Bombay Natural History Society. 30 (2): 235–241.
- Baker, E. C. S. (1926). "The game birds of the Indian Empire. Vol 5. the waders and other semi-sporting birds. Part 1". Journal of the Bombay Natural History Society. 31 (2): 233–238.
- Baker, E. C. S. (1926). "The game birds of the Indian Empire. Vol 5. the waders and other semi-sporting birds. Part 2". Journal of the Bombay Natural History Society. 31 (3): 533–546.
- Baker, E. C. S. (1927). "The game birds of the Indian Empire. Vol 5. the waders and other semi-sporting birds. Part 3". Journal of the Bombay Natural History Society. 32 (1): 1–13.
- Baker, E. C. S. (1927). "The game birds of the Indian Empire. Vol 5. the waders and other semi-sporting birds. Part 4". Journal of the Bombay Natural History Society. 32 (2): 237–245.
- Baker, E. C. S. (1928). "The game birds of the Indian Empire. Vol. 5. the waders and other semi-sporting birds. Part 5". Journal of the Bombay Natural History Society. 32 (3): 397–407.
- Baker, E. C. S. (1928). "The game birds of the Indian Empire. Vol 5. the waders and other semi-sporting birds. Part 6". Journal of the Bombay Natural History Society. 32 (4): 617–621.
- Baker, E. C. S. (1928). "The game birds of the Indian Empire, part 7". Journal of the Bombay Natural History Society. 33 (1): 1–6.
- Baker, E. C. S. (1929). "The game birds of the Indian empire. Part 8". Journal of the Bombay Natural History Society. 33 (2): 223–228.
- Baker, E. C. S. (1929). "The game birds of the Indian empire. Part 9". Journal of the Bombay Natural History Society. 33 (2): 473–479.
- Baker, E. C. S. (1929). "The game birds of the Indian empire. Part 10". Journal of the Bombay Natural History Society. 33 (4): 745–752.
- Baker, E. C. S. (1929). "The game birds of the Indian empire. Part 11". Journal of the Bombay Natural History Society. 33 (1): 1–11.
- Baker, E. C. S. (1929). "The game birds of the Indian empire. Part 12". Journal of the Bombay Natural History Society. 33 (4): 613–622.
- Baker, E. C. S. (1931). "The game birds of the Indian Empire. Vol. V. The Waders and other semi-sporting birds. Part 13". Journal of the Bombay Natural History Society. 34 (4): 859–876.
- Baker, E. C. S. (1931). "The game birds of the Indian Empire. Vol. V. The Waders and other semi-sporting birds. Part 14". Journal of the Bombay Natural History Society. 35 (1): 1–12.
- Baker, E. C. S. (1931). "The game birds of the Indian Empire, part 15". Journal of the Bombay Natural History Society. 35 (2): 241–253.
- Baker, E. C. S. (1932). "The game birds of the Indian Empire. Vol. V. The Waders and other semi-sporting birds.Part 16". Journal of the Bombay Natural History Society. 35 (3): 475–483.
- Baker, E. C. S. (1932). "The game birds of the Indian Empire, part 17". Journal of the Bombay Natural History Society. 35 (4): 703–721.
- Baker, E. C. S. (1932). "The game birds of the Indian Empire. Part 18". Journal of the Bombay Natural History Society. 36 (1): 1–12.
- Baker, E. C. S. (1933). "The game birds of the Indian Empire. Vol. V. The waders and other semi-sporting birds. Part 19". Journal of the Bombay Natural History Society. 36 (2): 293–306.
- Baker, E. C. S. (1934). "The game birds of the Indian Empire. Vol V. The waders and other semi-sporting birds. Part 20". Journal of the Bombay Natural History Society. 37 (1): 1–14.
- Baker, E. C. S. (1934). "The game birds of the Indian Empire. part 21". Journal of the Bombay Natural History Society. 37 (2): 245–254.
- Baker, E. C. S. (1935). "The game birds of the Indian Empire. Vol 5 part 22". Journal of the Bombay Natural History Society. 38 (1): 1–5.

Hand-list of the birds of India

- Baker, E. C. S. (1920). "Birds of the Indian Empire: Hand-list of the "Birds of India"". Journal of the Bombay Natural History Society. 27 (2): 228–247.
- Baker, E. C. S. (1921). "The birds of the Indian Empire: Hand-list of the "Birds of India." Part 2". Journal of the Bombay Natural History Society. 27 (3): 448–491.
- Baker, E. C. S. (1921). "The birds of the Indian Empire: Hand-list of the "Birds of India", Part 3". Journal of the Bombay Natural History Society. 27 (4): 692–744.
- Baker, E. C. S. (1921). "Hand-list of the "Birds of India", part 4". Journal of the Bombay Natural History Society. 28 (1): 085–106.
- Baker, E. C. S. (1922). "Hand-list of the "Birds of India". Part 5". Journal of the Bombay Natural History Society. 28 (2): 313–333.
- Baker, E. C. S. (1922). "Hand-list of the "Birds of India", part 6". Journal of the Bombay Natural History Society. 28 (3): 576–594.
- Baker, E. C. S. (1922). "Hand-list of the "Birds of India", part 7". Journal of the Bombay Natural History Society. 28 (4): 830–873.
- Baker, E. C. S. (1923). "Hand-list of the "birds of India." part 8". Journal of the Bombay Natural History Society. 29 (1): 9–22.

=== Range extensions ===
Baker continued to update the list and make corrections and note rarities being reported and on distributions. He noted the occurrence of Bewick's swans and Anser brachyrhynchus (from near Dibrugarh).

- Baker, E. C. S. (1901). "Occurrence of Podiceps cristatus in Assam". Journal of the Bombay Natural History Society. 13 (3): 535.
- Baker, E. C. S. (1901). "Occurrence of Macrorhamphus semipalmatus in Assam". Journal of the Bombay Natural History Society. 13 (4): 705–706.
- Baker, E. C. S. (1903). "Rare ducks". Journal of the Bombay Natural History Society. 15(1: 141–142.
- Baker, E. C. S. (1903). "The Crested Grebe". Journal of the Bombay Natural History Society. 15 (1): 142–143.
- Baker, E. C. S. (1903). "Note on Clangula glaucion (the Golden-eye)". Journal of the Bombay Natural History Society. 15 (2): 348–349.
- Baker, E. C. S. (1908). "An addition to the Indian avifauna. The Malayan Hawk-Cuckoo Hierococcyx fugax". Journal of the Bombay Natural History Society. 18 (4): 915.
- Baker, E. C. S. (1909). "Second occurrence of the Snipe-billed Godwit in Assam". Journal of the Bombay Natural History Society. 19 (4): 994.
- Baker, E. C. S. (1912). "The Sooty Tern (Sterna fuliginosa) in Cachar". Journal of the Bombay Natural History Society. 21 (2): 684.
- Baker, E. C. S. (1934). "The long-tailed duck". Journal of the Bombay Natural History Society. 37 (3): 549–552.

=== Books ===
Several of Baker's works were revised and produced as books. The most significant work was the second edition to the Fauna of British India series on birds. He noted that it was work in process and that errors were always likely to creep in. Some misprints and other problems were pointed out for instance by C.B. Ticehurst. Some like T.R. Livesey and Hugh Whistler were completely opposed to Baker's use of trinomials.

Baker took an interest in cuckoos and puzzled over how their eggs matched those of their hosts despite a single species parasitizing multiple species of hosts with entirely different kinds of eggs. He believed that cuckoos laid their egg on the ground and carried them in their bills into the nest of their host. He even cited Hume for a note on shooting a cuckoo with an egg looking like that of the host in its bill. One of Baker's correspondent provided him a blue egg from the oviduct of a female that had been shot. In a later note he observed that cuckoos destroyed one or two of the host's eggs before adding its own. Towards the end of his life Baker took a renewed interest in the ecology and evolution of cuckoos and was the topic of his last book in 1942.

- Baker, E. C. S. (1921). The Game-birds of India, Burma and Ceylon. Ducks and Their Allies. 2nd ed. Vol. 1. London: Bombay Natural History Society/John Bale, Sons.
- Baker, E. C. S. (1921). The Game-birds of India, Burma and Ceylon. 2nd ed. Vol. 2. London: Bombay Natural History Society/John Bale, Sons and Danielsson, Ltd.
- Baker, E. C. S. (1930). The Game-Birds of India, Burma, and Ceylon (Pheasants and Bustard-Quail). Vol. 3. Bombay Natural History Society.

Fauna of British India - second edition

- Baker, E. C. S. (1922). The Fauna of British India, Including Ceylon and Burma. 2nd ed. Vol. 1. London: Taylor and Francis.
- Baker, E. C. S. (1924). The Fauna of British India, Including Ceylon and Burma. 2nd ed. Vol. 2. London: Taylor and Francis.
- Baker, E. C. S. (1926). The Fauna of British India, Including Ceylon and Burma. 2nd ed. Vol. 3. London: Taylor and Francis.
- Baker, E. C. S. (1927). The Fauna of British India, Including Ceylon and Burma. 2nd ed. Vol. 4. London: Taylor and Francis.
- Baker, E. C. S. (1928). The Fauna of British India, Including Ceylon and Burma. 2nd ed. Vol. 5. London: Taylor and Francis.
- Baker, E. C. S. (1929). The Fauna of British India, Including Ceylon and Burma. 2nd ed. Vol. 6. London: Taylor and Francis.
- Baker, E. C. S. (1930). The Fauna of British India, Including Ceylon and Burma. 2nd ed. Vol. 7. London: Taylor and Francis.
- Baker, E. C. S. (1930). The Fauna of British India, Including Ceylon and Burma. 2nd ed. Vol. 8. Synonymical Catalogue, Grallae—Pygopodes; Corrigenda and Addenda; Index. London: Taylor and Francis.

=== Hand-list ===
- Baker, E. C. S. (1923). A hand-list of the Genera and Species of birds of the Indian Empire. Bombay: Bombay Natural History Society.

=== Nidification of Birds ===
- Baker, E. C. S. (1932). The Nidification of Birds of the Indian Empire. Vol. 1. London: Taylor & Francis.
- Baker, E. C. S. (1933). The Nidification of Birds of the Indian Empire. Vol. 2. London: Taylor & Francis.
- Baker, E. C. S. (1934). The Nidification of Birds of the Indian Empire. Vol. 3. London: Taylor & Francis.
- Baker, E. C. S. (1935). The Nidification of Birds of the Indian Empire. Vol. 4. London: Taylor & Francis..

Cuckoo problems

- Baker, E. C. S. (1942). Cuckoo Problems. London: H.F. & G. Witherby Ltd.
