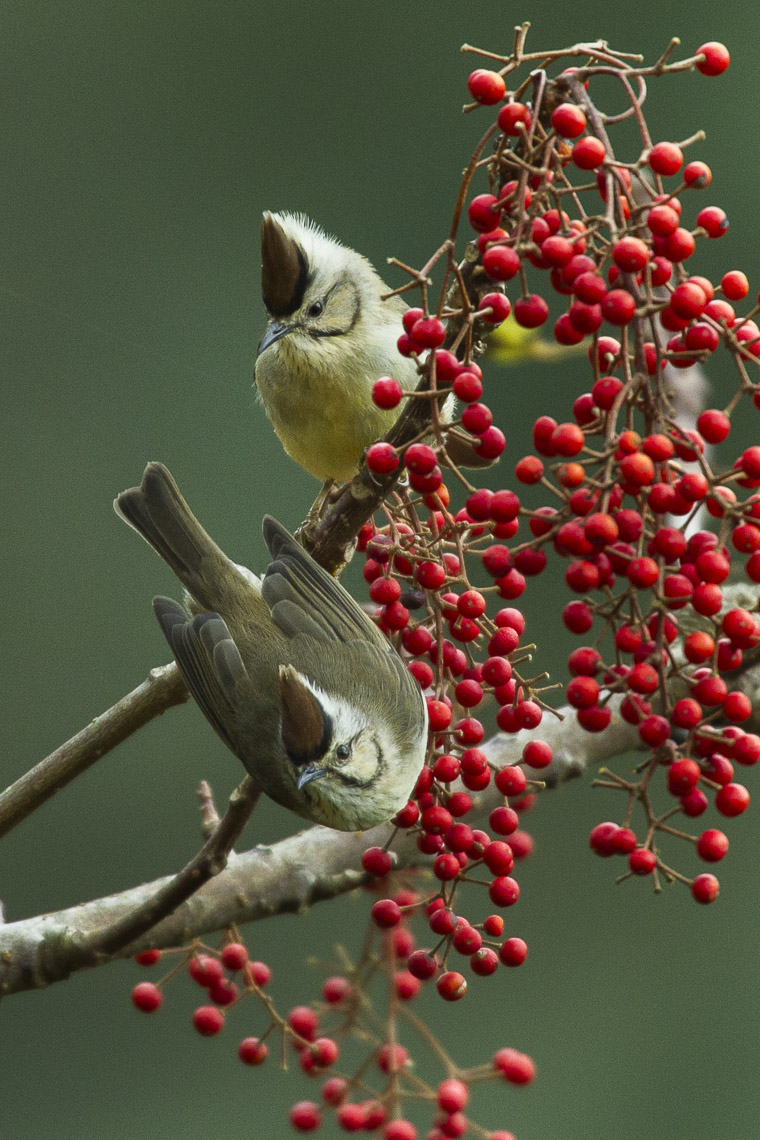
- A pair photographed at the Dasyueshan National Forest

Conservation status
- Least Concern (IUCN 3.1)

Scientific classification
- Kingdom: Animalia
- Phylum: Chordata
- Class: Aves
- Order: Passeriformes
- Family: Zosteropidae
- Genus: Yuhina
- Species: Y. brunneiceps

Binomial name
- Yuhina brunneiceps Ogilvie-Grant, 1906

= Taiwan yuhina =

Species of bird

The Taiwan yuhina (Yuhina brunneiceps), also known as Formosan yuhina, is a small songbird endemic to the island of Taiwan.

== Taxonomy and systematics ==
Like other yuhinas, it is closely related to the white-eyes and if these were considered a distinct family Zosteropidae, it would be placed there. Otherwise, it would be classed with the white-eyes in the Old World babbler Timaliidae family. The closest living relative of this species appears to be the black-chinned yuhina, which occurs on the Asian mainland.

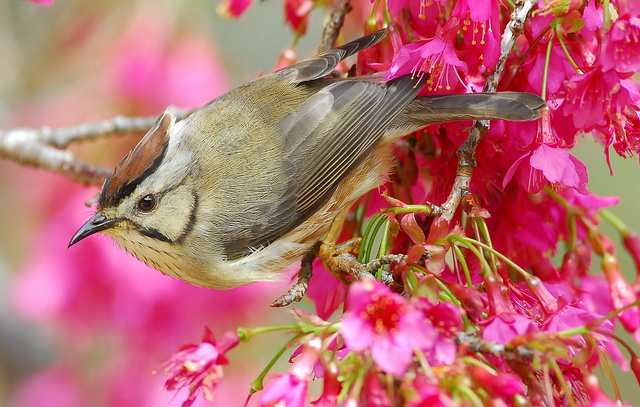
Taiwan yuhina

== Description ==
The Taiwan yuhina is 12–13 cm (4.7–5.1 in) in length with a chocolate brown crest and a black beard stripe descending from its beak. The bird's back, wings and tail are dark ash brown, and its lower breast is lighter in colour. Agreeing with other typical yuhinas in habitus, its colouration pattern makes it rather distinctive among the genus.

== Habitat and ecology ==
This species is found in hill forests at elevations of 1,000–3,200 m (3,300–10,500 ft) above sea level, although it is most common between 1,500–2,500 m (4,900–8,200 ft); it can descend to lower altitudes in winter. It is gregarious, active and quite tame. It keeps to lower forest and often joins other species, especially tits in mixed flocks. The flocks, while feeding, make a constant soft chatter. The call of the Taiwan yuhina is a sound somewhat like twi-MI-chiu, which resembles the phrase "We MEET you". The Taiwan yuhina's diet mainly consists of nectar, berries, flowers and small insects. It may sometimes be observed hanging upside down on cherry trees. These songbirds are particularly fond of the flowers of the Chinese tulip tree and the fruits of trees of the family Elaeagnaceae and the genus Idesia (Salicaceae).

Based on a population in Nantou County, diet during the breeding season mostly consists of nectar and fruits of Taiwan cherry (Prunus campanulata), fruits of eastern debregeasia (Debregeasia orientalis), and the nectar of mistletoe Taxillus lonicerifolius.

The breeding season for the Taiwan yuhina is from May to June.
