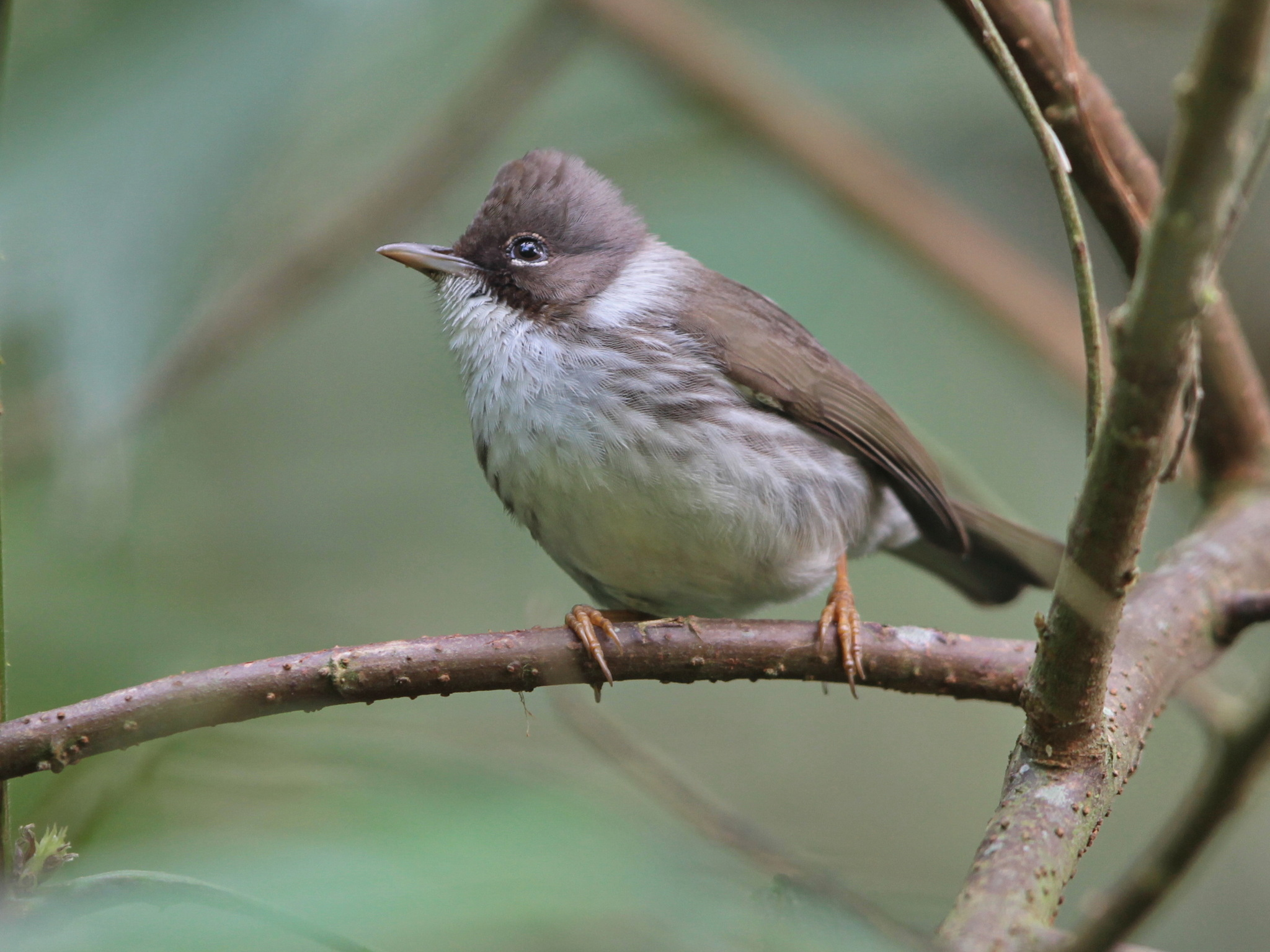

Conservation status
- Least Concern (IUCN 3.1)

Scientific classification
- Kingdom: Animalia
- Phylum: Chordata
- Class: Aves
- Order: Passeriformes
- Family: Zosteropidae
- Genus: Yuhina
- Species: Y. humilis

Binomial name
- Yuhina humilis (Hume, 1877)

= Burmese yuhina =

Species of bird

The Burmese yuhina (Yuhina humilis) is a species of bird in the family Zosteropidae. It is found in Myanmar and Thailand. Its natural habitat is subtropical or tropical moist montane forests.
