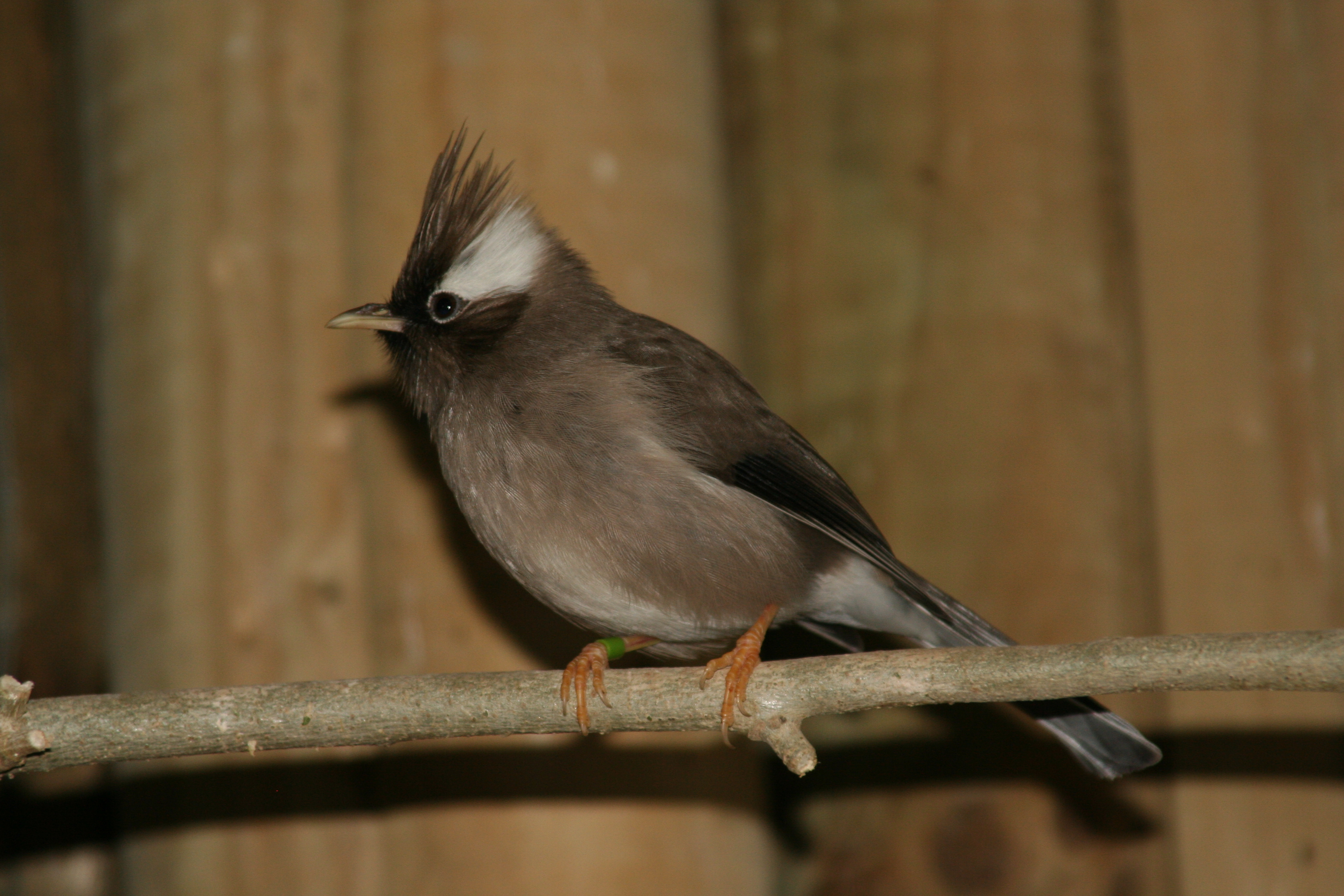
- White-collared yuhina Yuhina diademata

Scientific classification
- Kingdom: Animalia
- Phylum: Chordata
- Class: Aves
- Order: Passeriformes
- Family: Zosteropidae
- Genus: Yuhina; Hodgson, 1836

Type species
- Yuhina gularis (stripe-throated yuhina) Hodgson, 1836

Species
- see text

= Yuhina =

Genus of birds

Yuhina is a genus of passerine birds in the white-eye family Zosteropidae that are found in the Himalayas and mainland Southeast Asia

== Taxonomy ==
The genus Yuhina was introduced in 1836 by the English naturalist Brian Houghton Hodgson with the stripe-throated yuhina as the type species. The genus name is from the Nepali language. The genus was formerly placed in the Old World babbler family Timaliidae. It was moved to Zosteropidae based on results of molecular phylogenetic studies.

The genus contains the following seven species:

Image	Common name	Scientific name	Distribution
	Black-chinned yuhina	Yuhina nigrimenta	northern India eastward to central and southeastern China, southward to western Myanmar, northern and central Laos, Vietnam, and far eastern Cambodia
	Taiwan yuhina	Yuhina brunneiceps	montane forest of Taiwan
	Whiskered yuhina	Yuhina flavicollis	Himalayas
	Burmese yuhina	Yuhina humilis	Myanmar to central Laos
	White-naped yuhina	Yuhina bakeri	mountains of northeastern India (Assam) to Myanmar and southern China (northwestern Yunnan)
	Stripe-throated yuhina	Yuhina gularis	Himalayas to south China and central Vietnam
	Rufous-vented yuhina	Yuhina occipitalis	Himalayas to south China

The white-bellied erpornis (Erpornis zantholeuca) was formerly assigned to this genus, with the common name "white-bellied yuhina".
