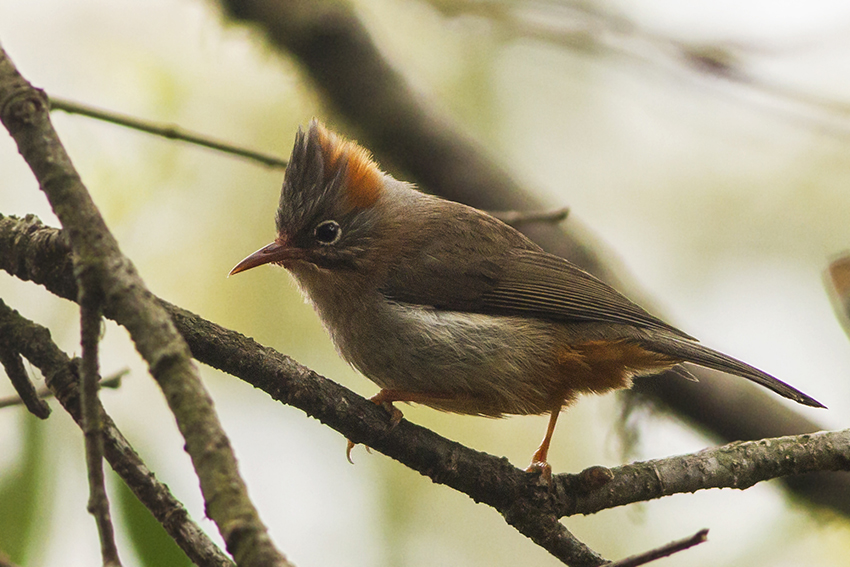

Conservation status
- Least Concern (IUCN 3.1)

Scientific classification
- Kingdom: Animalia
- Phylum: Chordata
- Class: Aves
- Order: Passeriformes
- Family: Zosteropidae
- Genus: Yuhina
- Species: Y. occipitalis

Binomial name
- Yuhina occipitalis Hodgson, 1836

= Rufous-vented yuhina =

Species of bird

The rufous-vented yuhina (Yuhina occipitalis) is a bird species in the white-eye family Zosteropidae. It is found along the northern parts of the Indian subcontinent, primarily in the Eastern Himalayas, and ranges across Bhutan, India, Tibet, Myanmar, and Nepal. Its natural habitat is subtropical or tropical moist montane forests.
