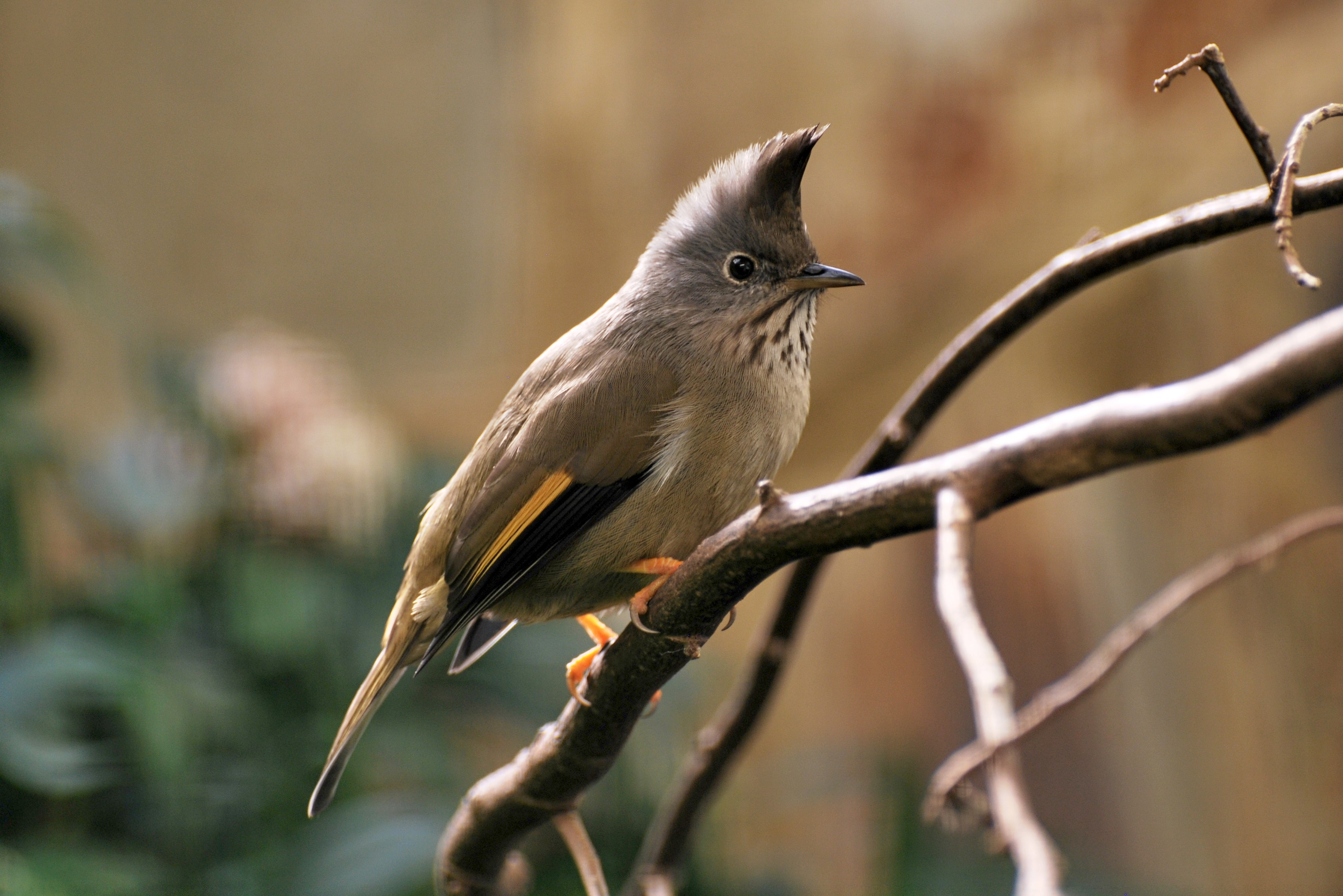

Conservation status
- Least Concern (IUCN 3.1)

Scientific classification
- Kingdom: Animalia
- Phylum: Chordata
- Class: Aves
- Order: Passeriformes
- Family: Zosteropidae
- Genus: Yuhina
- Species: Y. gularis

Binomial name
- Yuhina gularis Hodgson, 1836

= Stripe-throated yuhina =

Species of bird

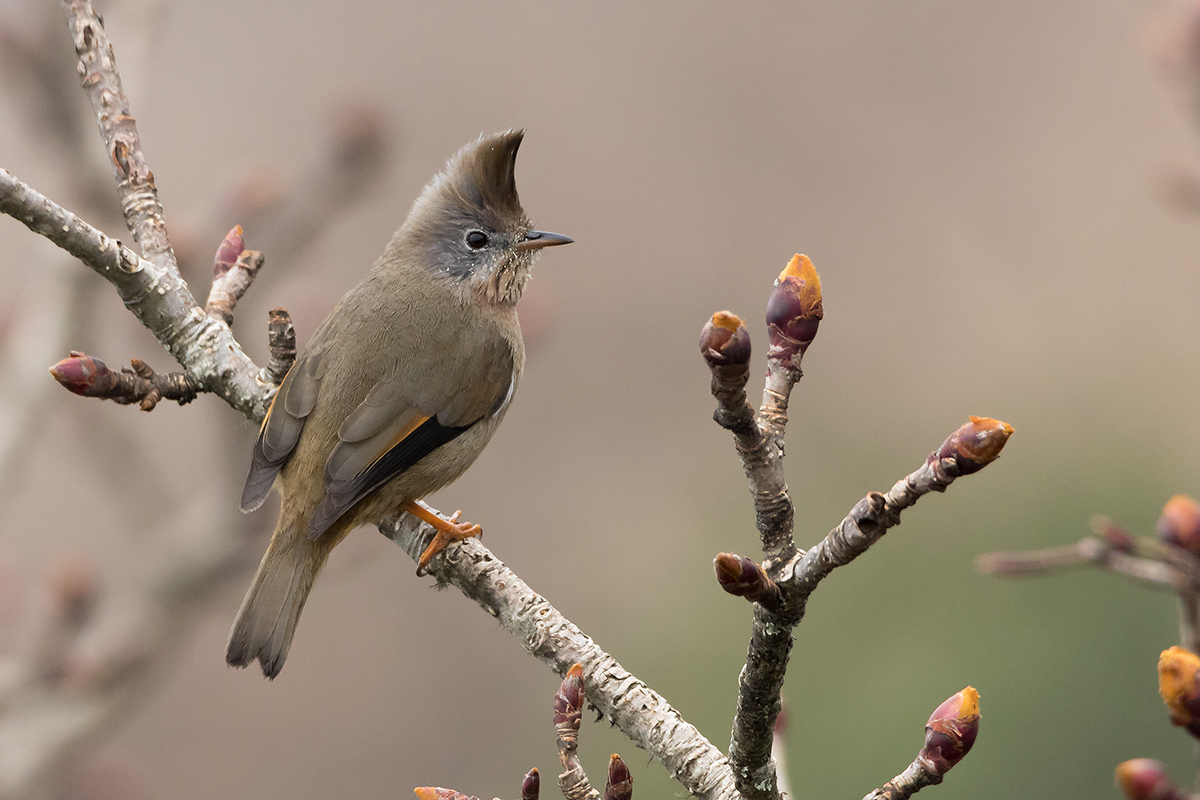
Y. g. gularis, Sikkim

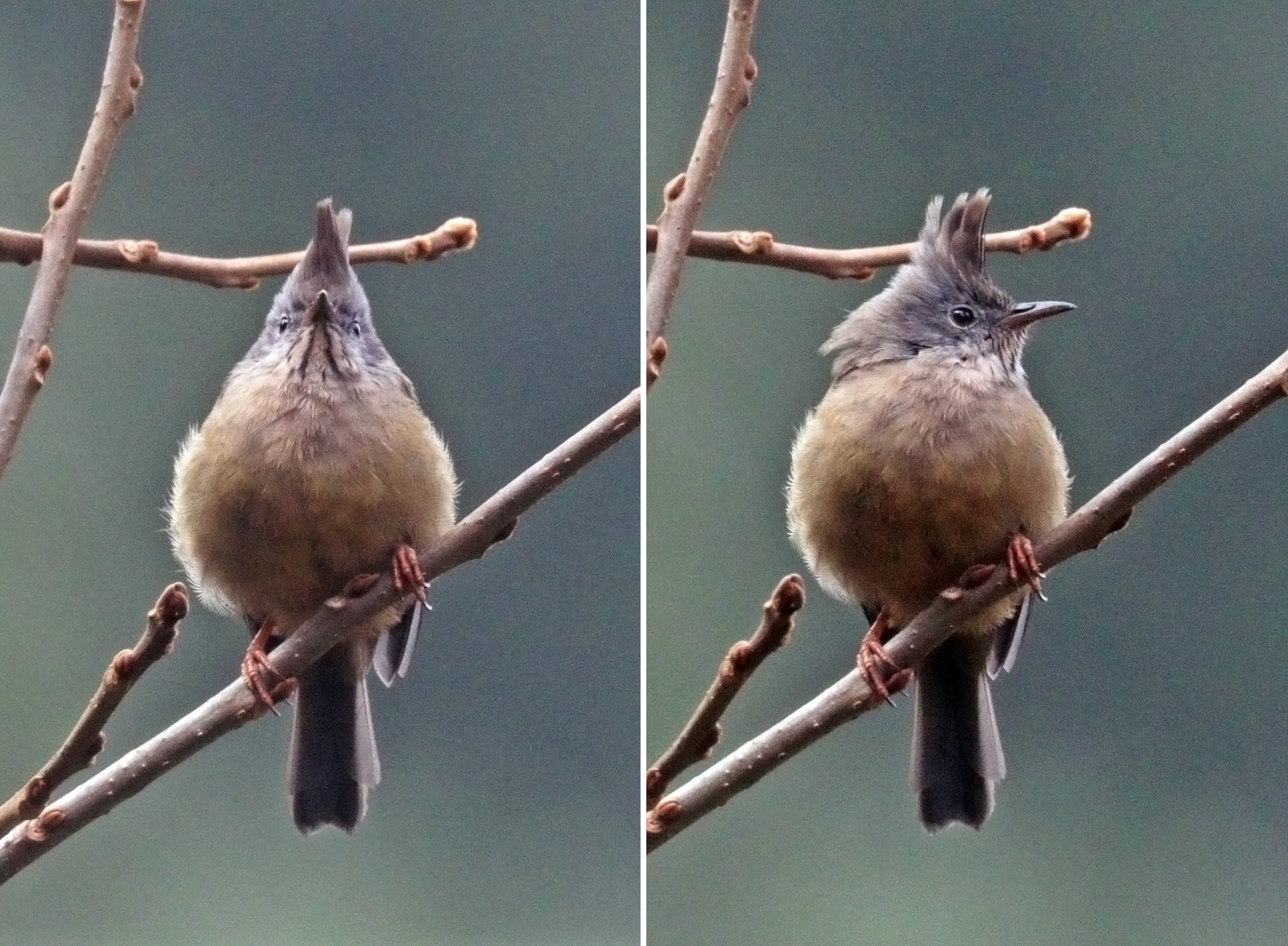
Y. g. gularis, Nepal

The stripe-throated yuhina (Yuhina gularis) is a bird species in the white-eye family Zosteropidae.

It is found from the Himalayas to southern China and central Vietnam. Its natural habitat is subtropical or tropical moist montane forests.
