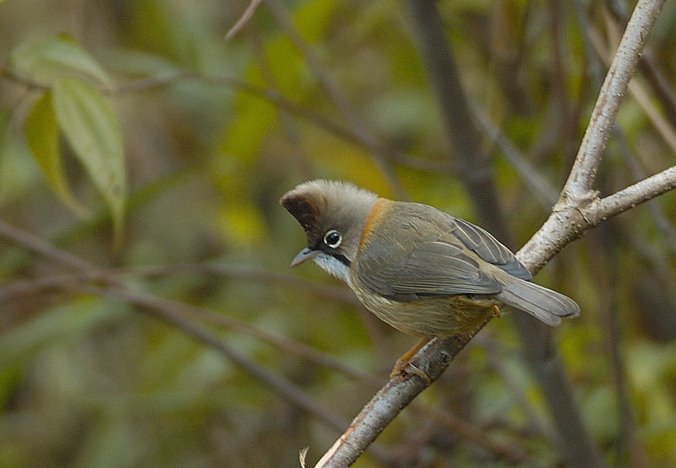

Conservation status
- Least Concern (IUCN 3.1)

Scientific classification
- Kingdom: Animalia
- Phylum: Chordata
- Class: Aves
- Order: Passeriformes
- Family: Zosteropidae
- Genus: Yuhina
- Species: Y. flavicollis

Binomial name
- Yuhina flavicollis Hodgson, 1836

= Whiskered yuhina =

Species of bird

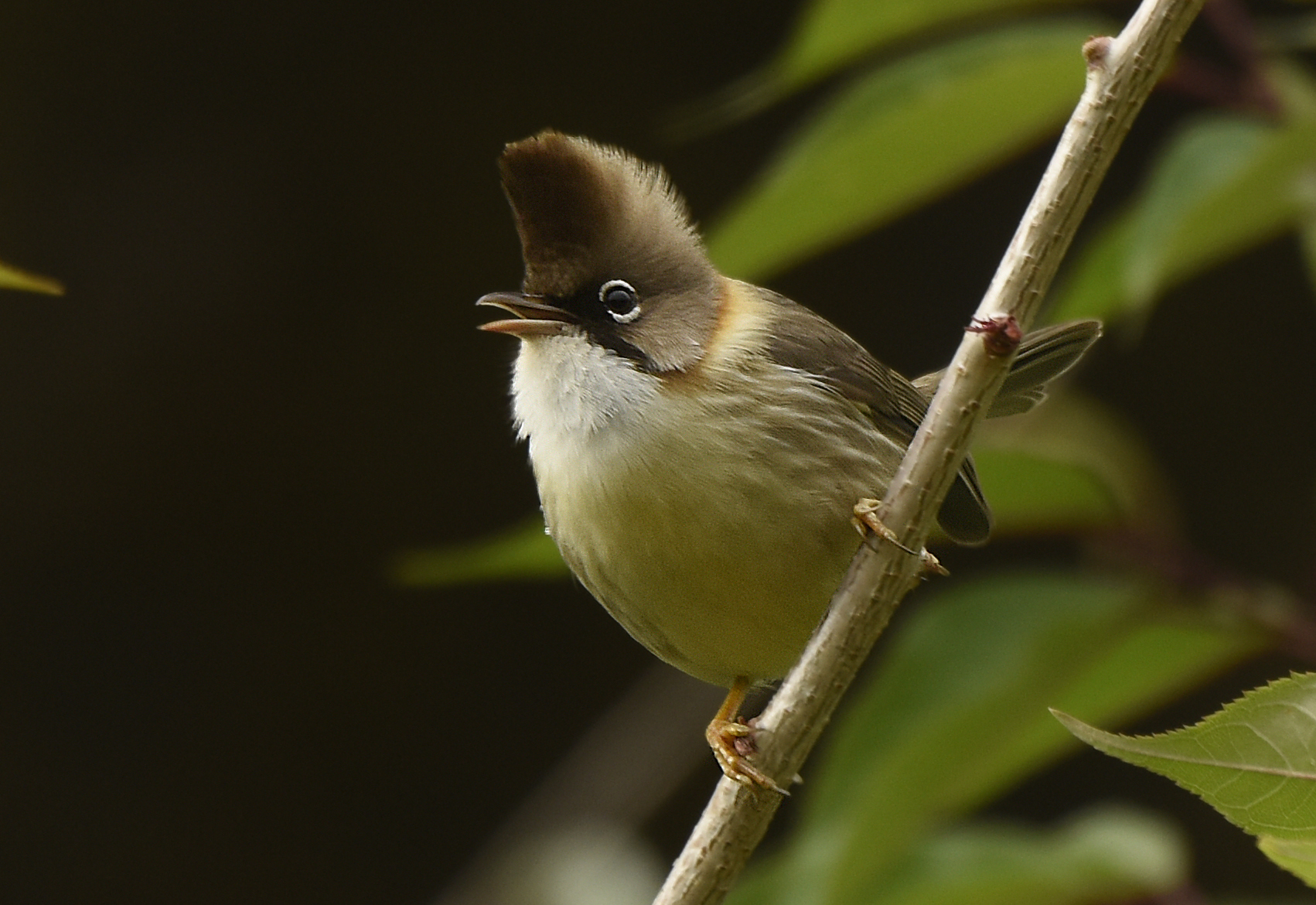
Whiskered Yuhina at Nainital

The whiskered yuhina (Yuhina flavicollis) is a bird species in the white-eye family Zosteropidae. Its range extends across the Himalayan forests in northern India to northeast Indian states, Nepal, Bhutan, Bangladesh and in the east to Indochina including Laos, Myanmar, Thailand, and Vietnam. Its natural habitat is subtropical or tropical moist montane forests. The whiskered yuhina is sometimes found in mixed hunting parties with other yuhina and fulvetta species, but it has also been reported to not associate with mixed hunting parties in some areas. It is described as one of the commonest yuhinas in the Himalayas, although it is relatively uncommon to rare at low elevations. It prefers relatively undisturbed closed canopy cover. It is one among several other birds hunted by livestock herders in Northeast India.
