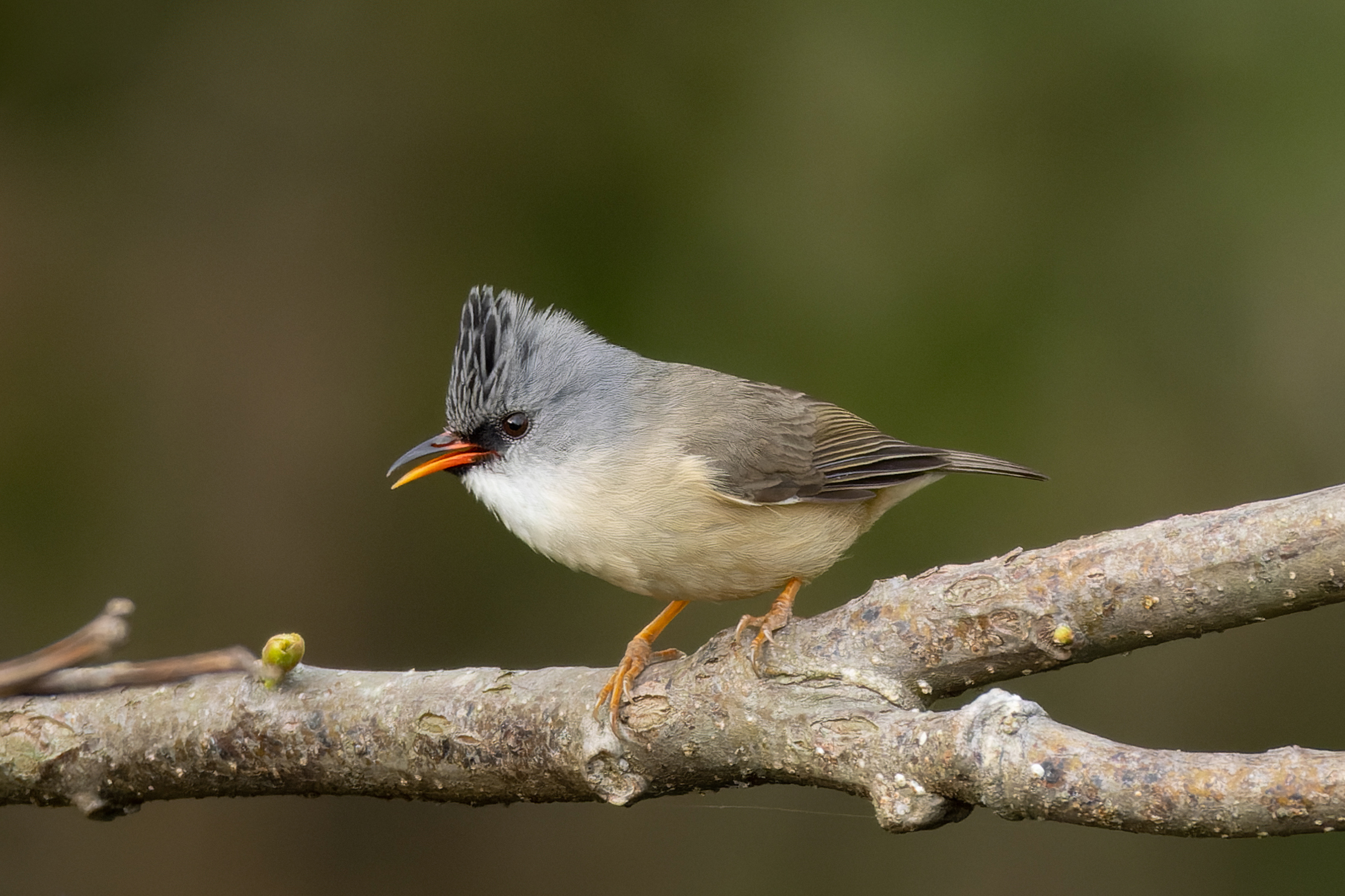
- In Kurseong, West Bengal, India.

Conservation status
- Least Concern (IUCN 3.1)

Scientific classification
- Kingdom: Animalia
- Phylum: Chordata
- Class: Aves
- Order: Passeriformes
- Family: Zosteropidae
- Genus: Yuhina
- Species: Y. nigrimenta

Binomial name
- Yuhina nigrimenta Blyth, 1845

= Black-chinned yuhina =

Species of bird

The black-chinned yuhina (Yuhina nigrimenta) is a bird species in the white-eye family Zosteropidae.

It is found in the Indian subcontinent from the Himalayas eastwards to contiguous hilly regions of Southeast Asia. The species ranges across Bangladesh, Bhutan, Cambodia, India, Laos, Myanmar, Nepal, Tibet and Thailand. Its natural habitats are subtropical or tropical moist lowland forests, as well as subtropical or tropical moist montane forests.

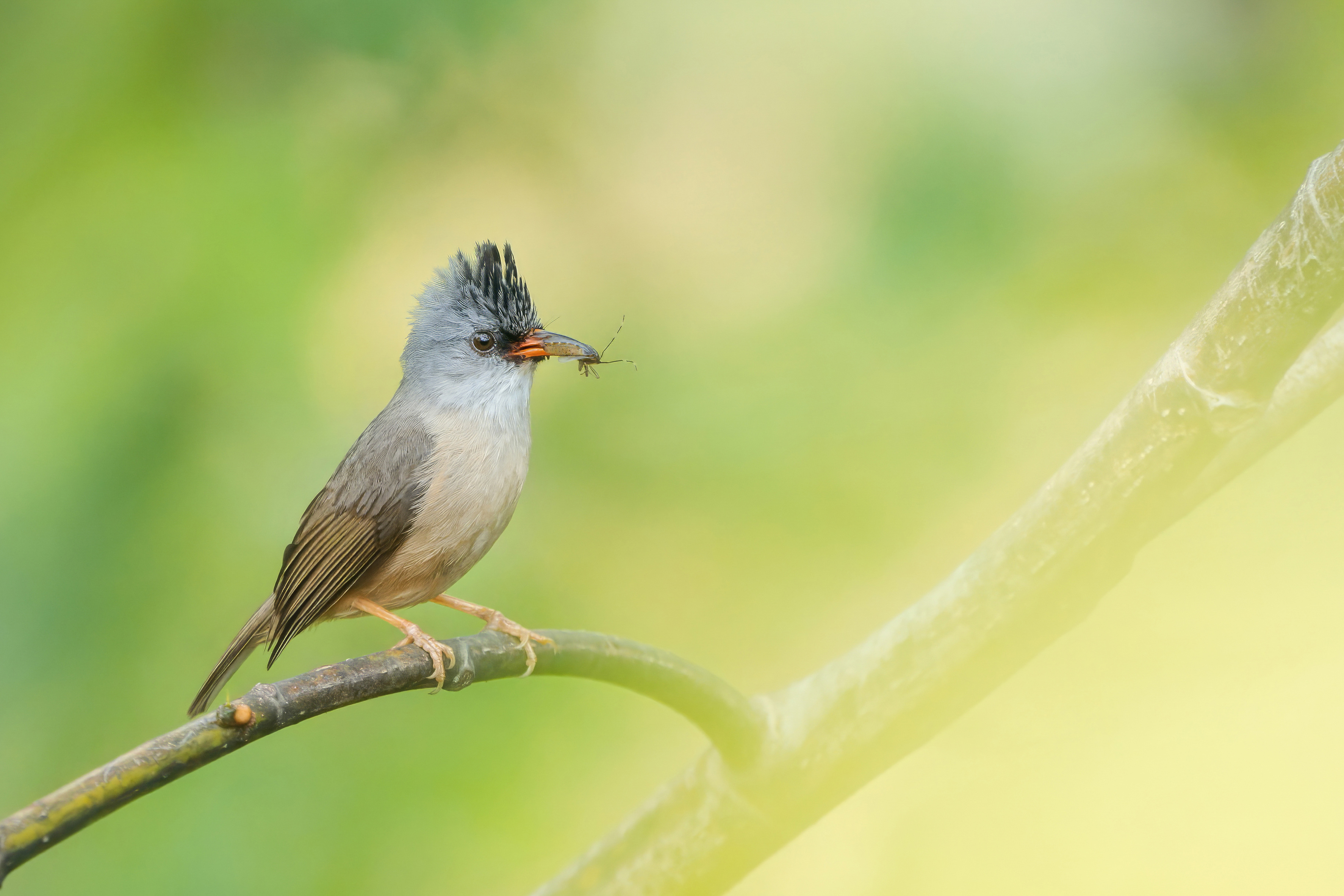
Black-chinned Yuhina Yuhina nigrimenta, at Sindhuli Gadi, Nepal
