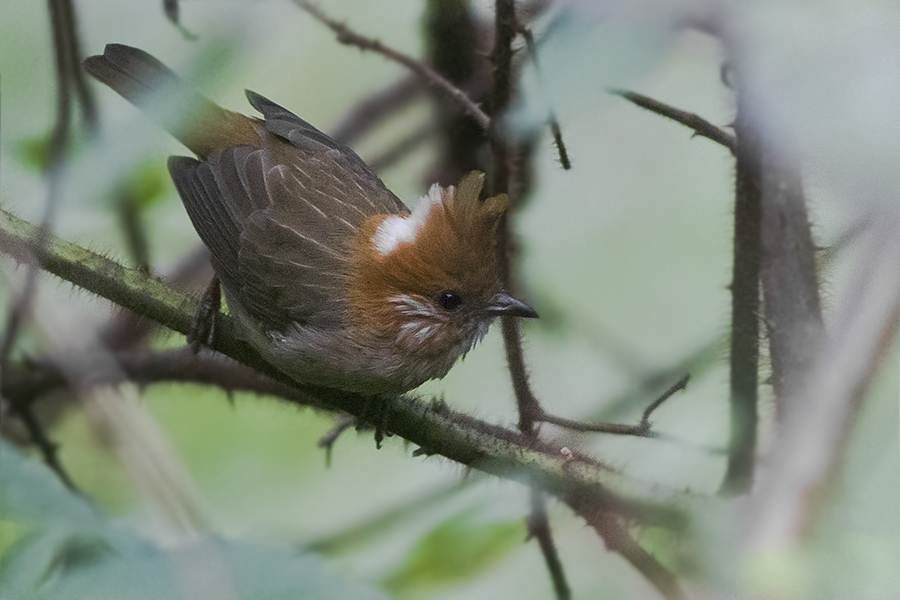
- White-naped Yuhina from Khangchendzonga National Park in West Sikkim, India.
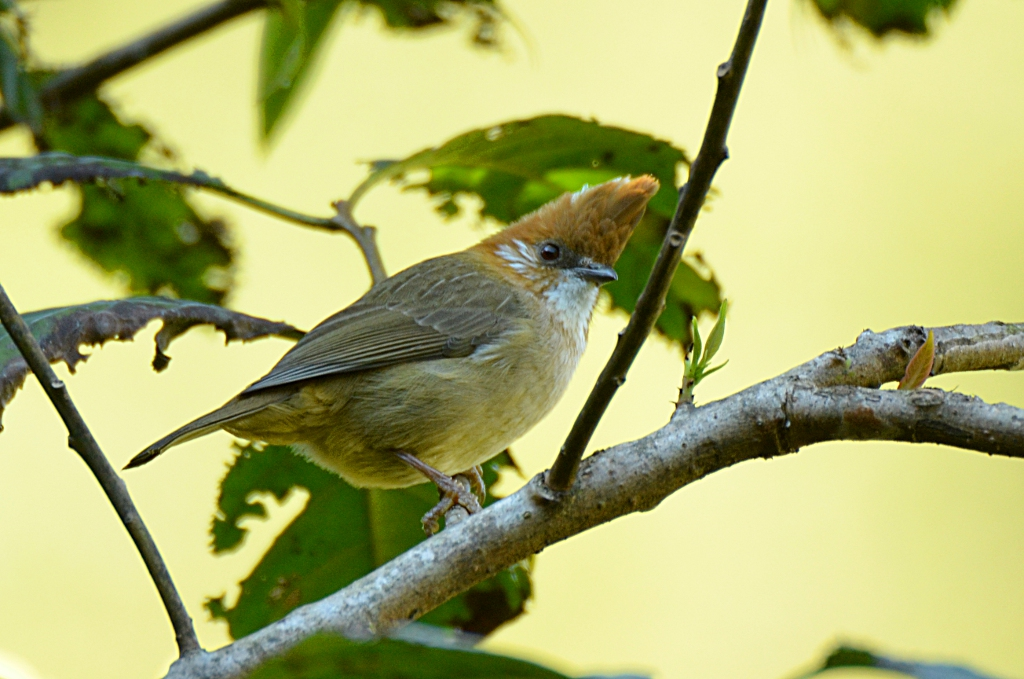
- White-naped Yuhina from Mishmi Hills in Arunachal Pradesh, India.

Conservation status
- Least Concern (IUCN 3.1)

Scientific classification
- Kingdom: Animalia
- Phylum: Chordata
- Class: Aves
- Order: Passeriformes
- Family: Zosteropidae
- Genus: Yuhina
- Species: Y. bakeri

Binomial name
- Yuhina bakeri Rothschild, 1926

= White-naped yuhina =

Species of bird

The white-naped yuhina (Yuhina bakeri) is a bird species in the white-eye family Zosteropidae.

It is found from the Himalayas to northern Myanmar. Its natural habitats are temperate forests and subtropical or tropical moist lowland forests.

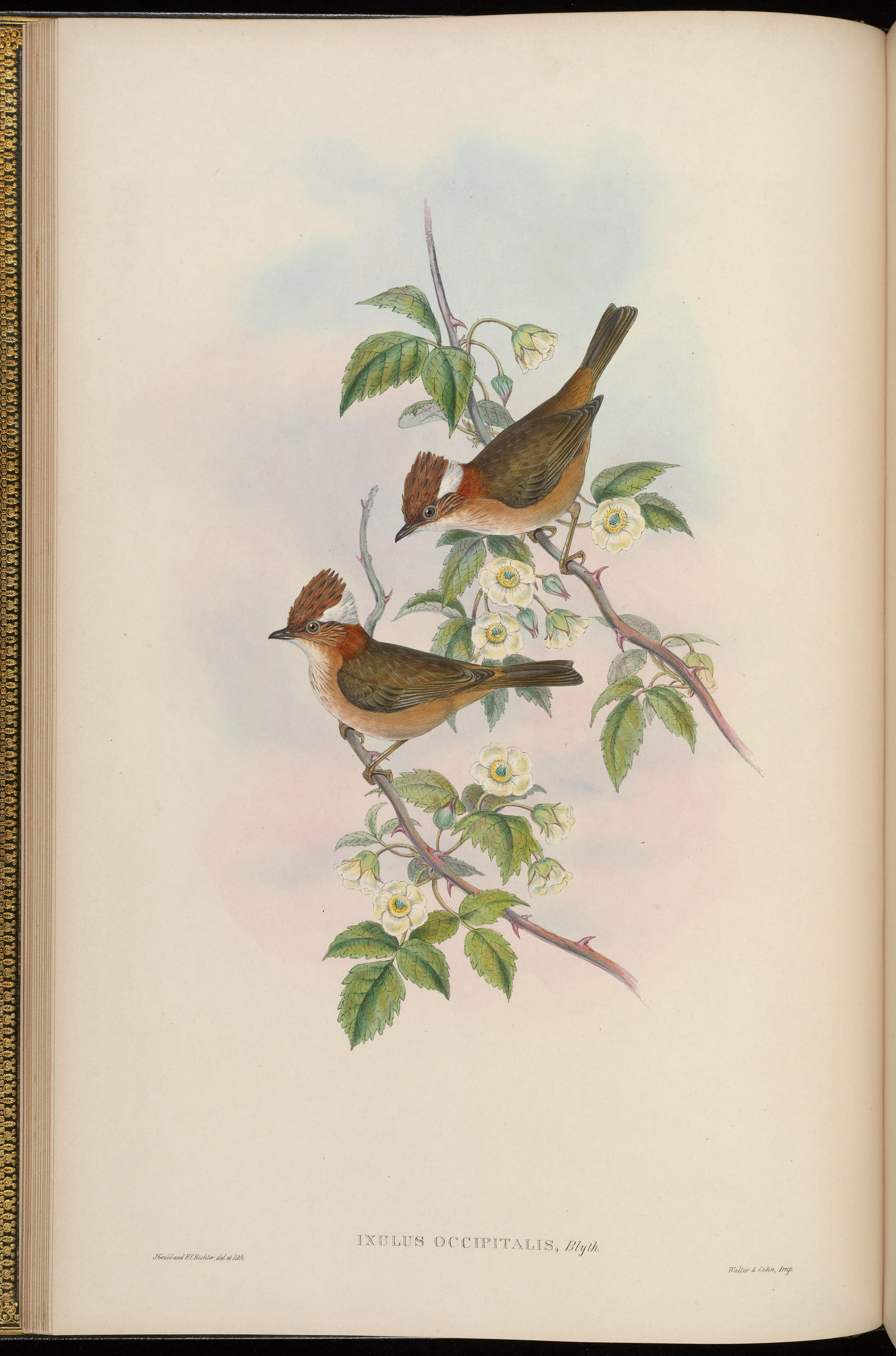
Reproduction from Birds of Asia., Volume IV, London
