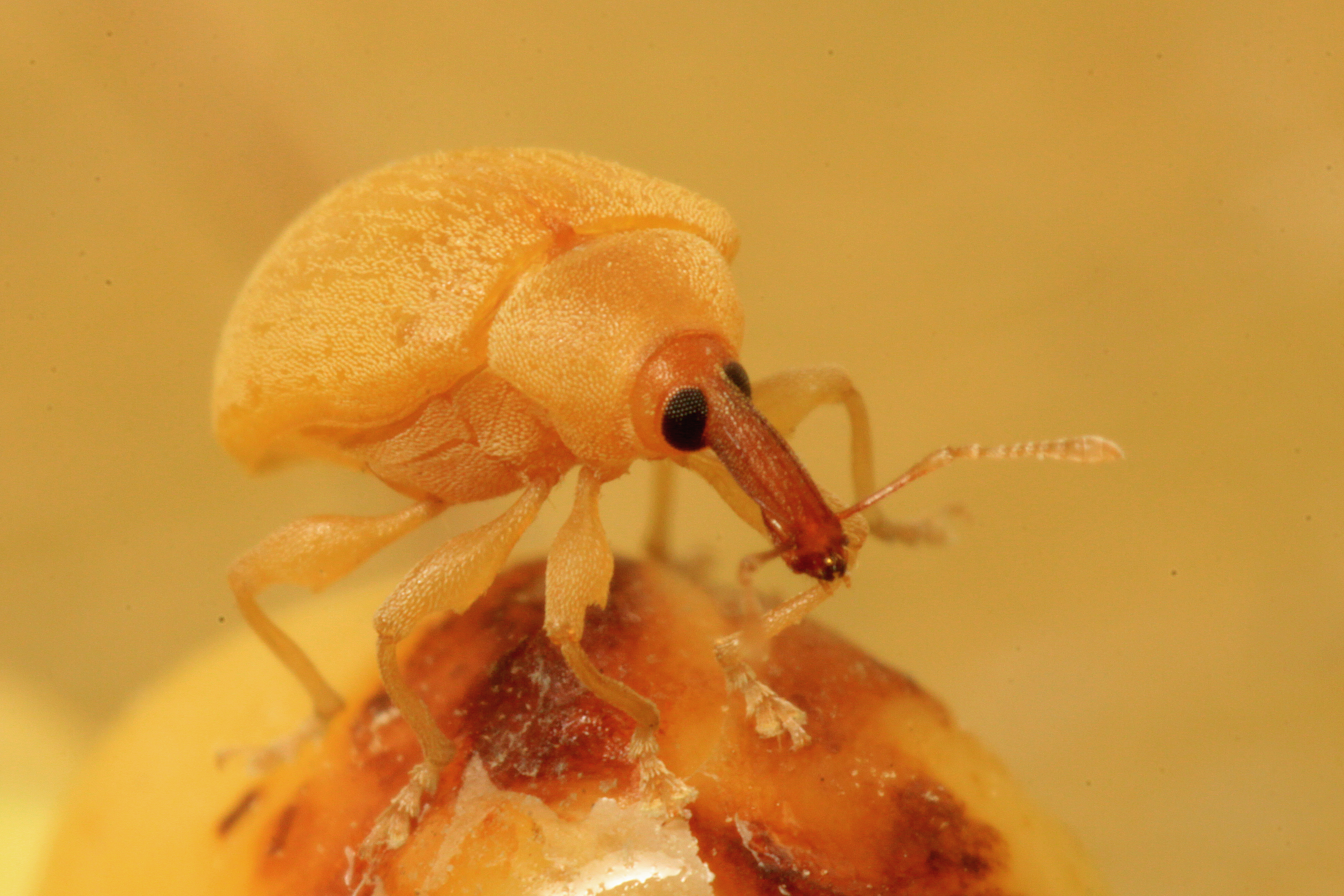
- A. aegrotus (female)

Scientific classification
- Kingdom: Animalia
- Phylum: Arthropoda
- Class: Insecta
- Order: Coleoptera
- Suborder: Polyphaga
- Infraorder: Cucujiformia
- Family: Curculionidae
- Tribe: Derelomini
- Genus: Anchylorhynchus; Schönherr, 1836

Type species
- Anchylorhynchus variabilis Gyllenhal, 1836

= Anchylorhynchus =

Genus of beetles

Anchylorhynchus is a genus of weevils belonging the family Curculionidae and subfamily Curculioninae. It currently includes 25 described species distributed from Panama to Argentina. Members of the genus are pollinators of palms in the genera Syagrus, Oenocarpus and Butia, with adults living in inflorescences and larvae feeding on developing fruits. The first instar larvae of Anchylorhynchus have an unusual morphology, being specialized on killing other larvae infesting the palm fruits.

== Adult morphology ==
Anchylorhynchus can be readily distinguished from other Derelomini by a number of features. The body is round, convex, and densely covered by scales varying from yellow to black. The rostrum is flattened dorso-verntrally at the apex, and exhibits 2-7 longitudinal grooves from the base of the rostrum to the insertion of antennae. The antennal funicle (segments excluding the first and the club) has only six segments, as opposed to seven segments in other genera. The antennae are inserted at the apex of the rostrum in both sexes, while it is inserted closer to the base in most other Curculionidae (at least in females).

Species of Anchylorhynchus are sexually dimorphic, with males usually being larger than females. In some species, males also have longer tarsi, and/or denser and longer hairs in the ventrites, metasternum and tarsi. In all described species, females have a retraction in ventrites III-IV of the abdomen. The shape and degree of retraction varies between species, but these segments are always flat in males.

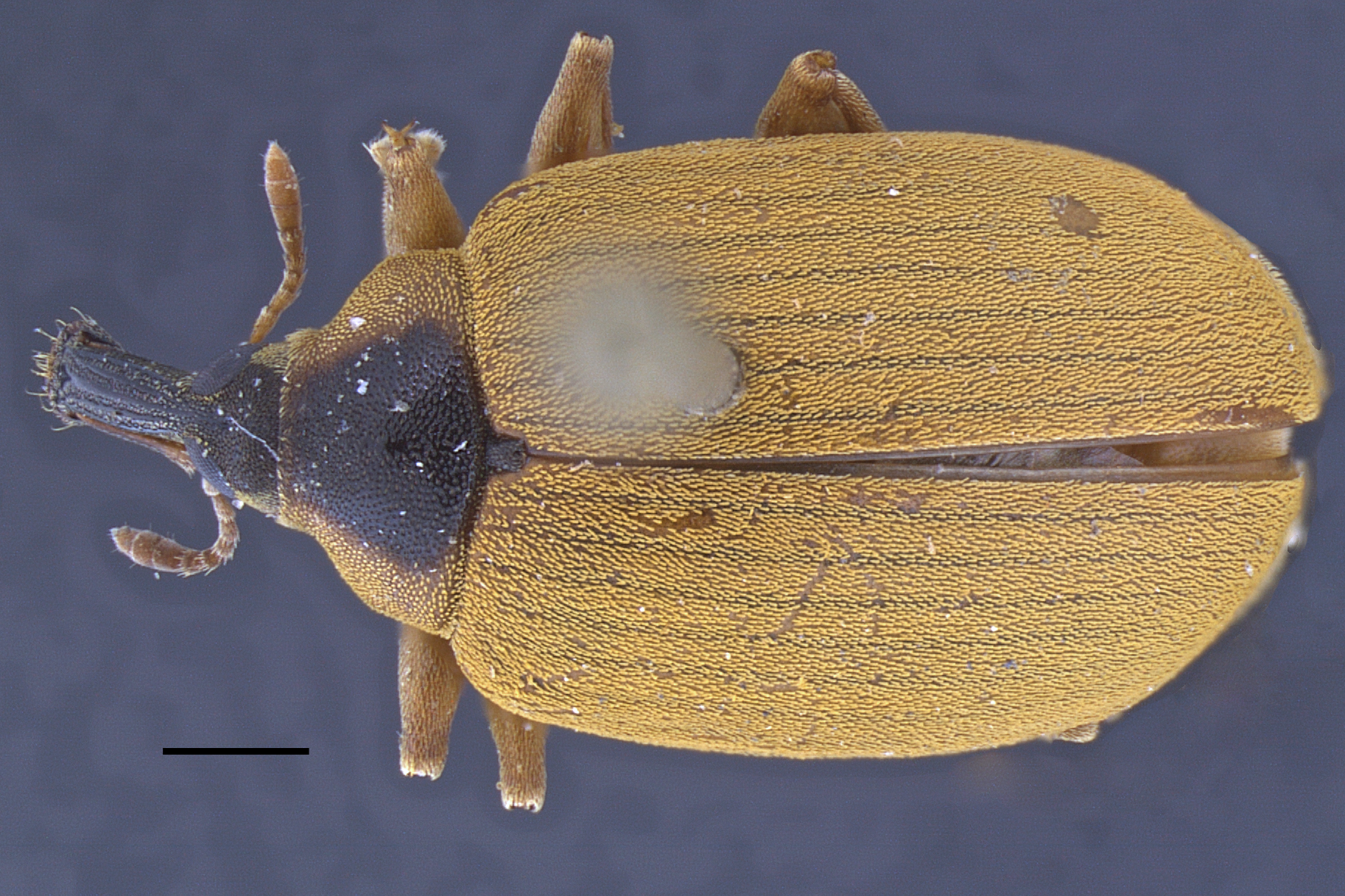
A. vanini, female, dorsal

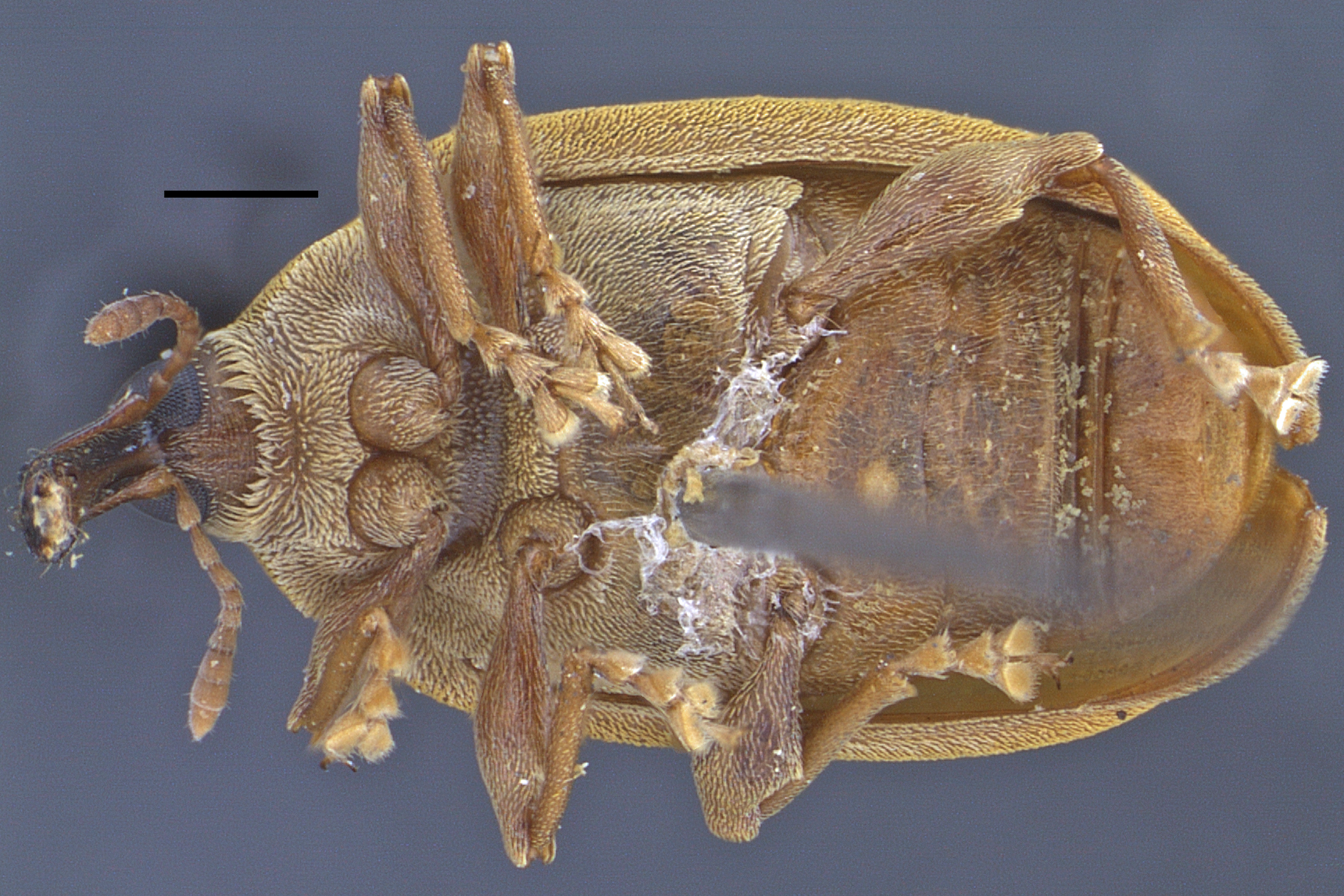
A. vanini, female, ventral

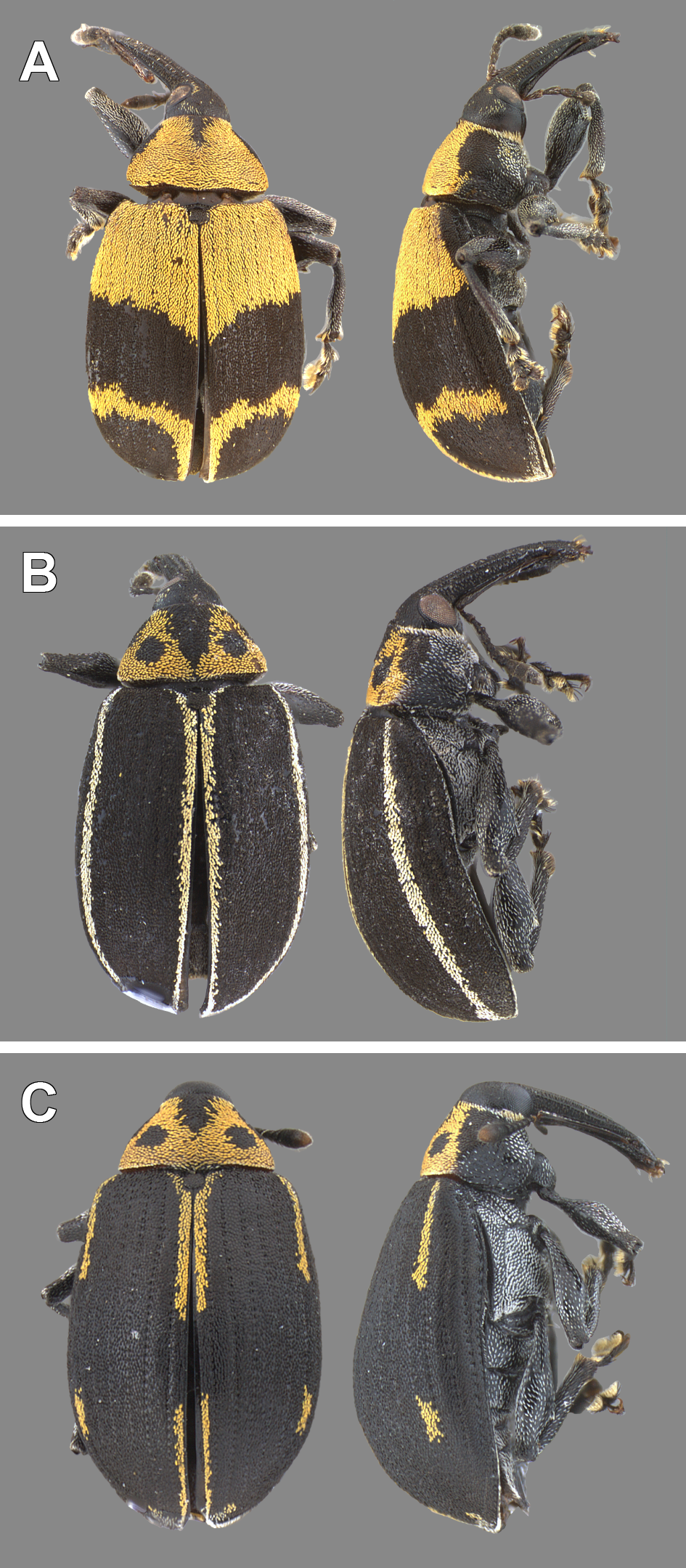
Color polymorphism in A. eriospathae

== Larval morphology and behavior ==
Cannibalism in Anchylorhynchus

Larvae of Anchylorhynchus go through 4 stages (instars) before molting into a pupa. The most distinctive stage is the first instar. First-instar larvae of Anchylorhynchus are unique in Curculionidae due to their falcate mandibles (usually found in insects that feed on other insects). Additionally, they are flattened dorso-ventrally, living between sepals and petals of female palm flowers. After hatching, larvae migrate to the base of the female flower, drilling a hole into the developing fruit. After entering the fruit, larvae molt and start consuming plant tissues, causing abortion of developing fruits. First- and second instar larvae attack and consume other larvae upon encountering them. Later instars avoid other larvae and are not aggressive. Starting on the second instar, larvae acquire the grub-like, cylindrical and C-shaped body characteristic of other Curculionidae. The mandible also changes its shape, becoming triangular and broad, adapted to crush plant tissues.

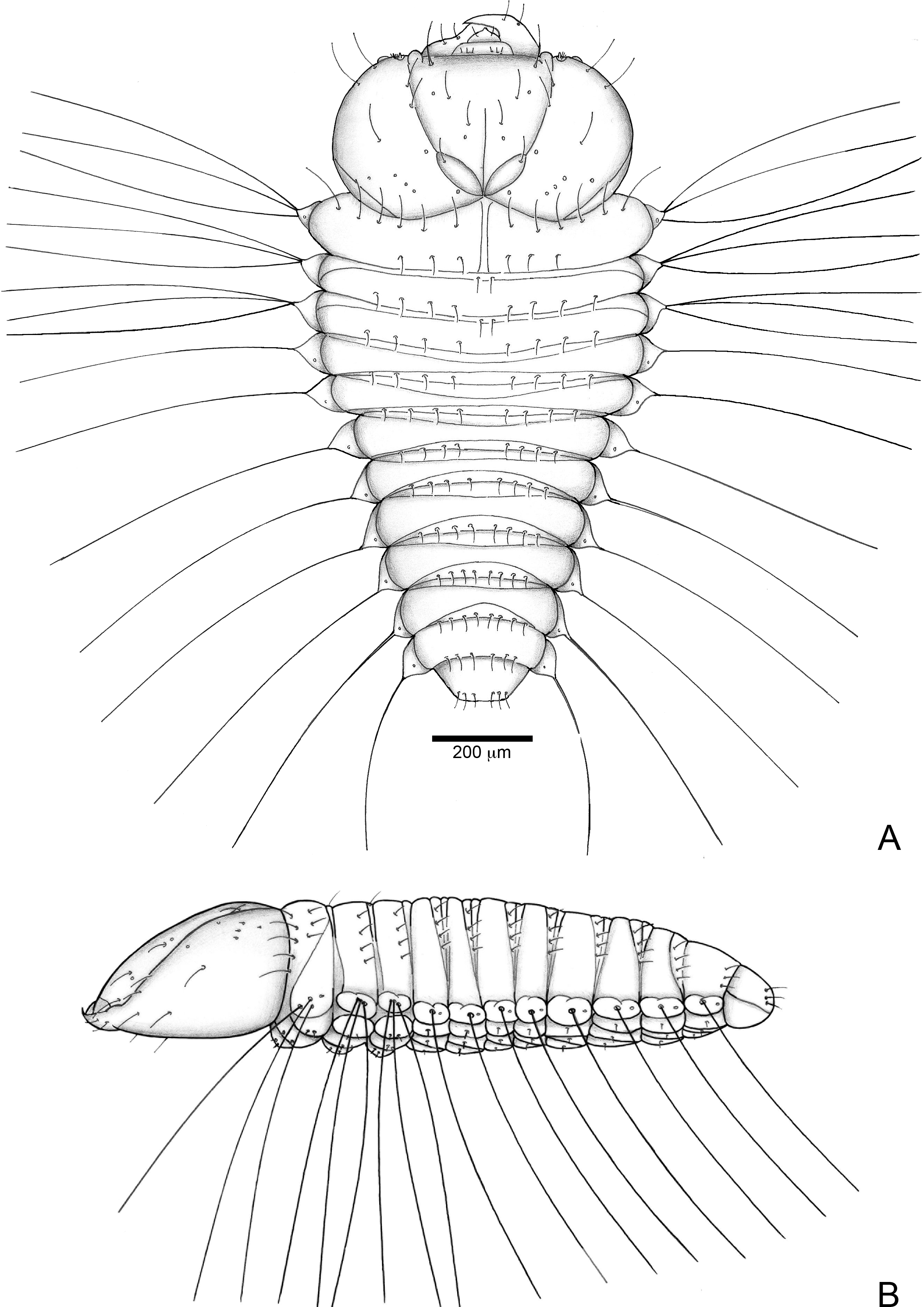
First-instar larva

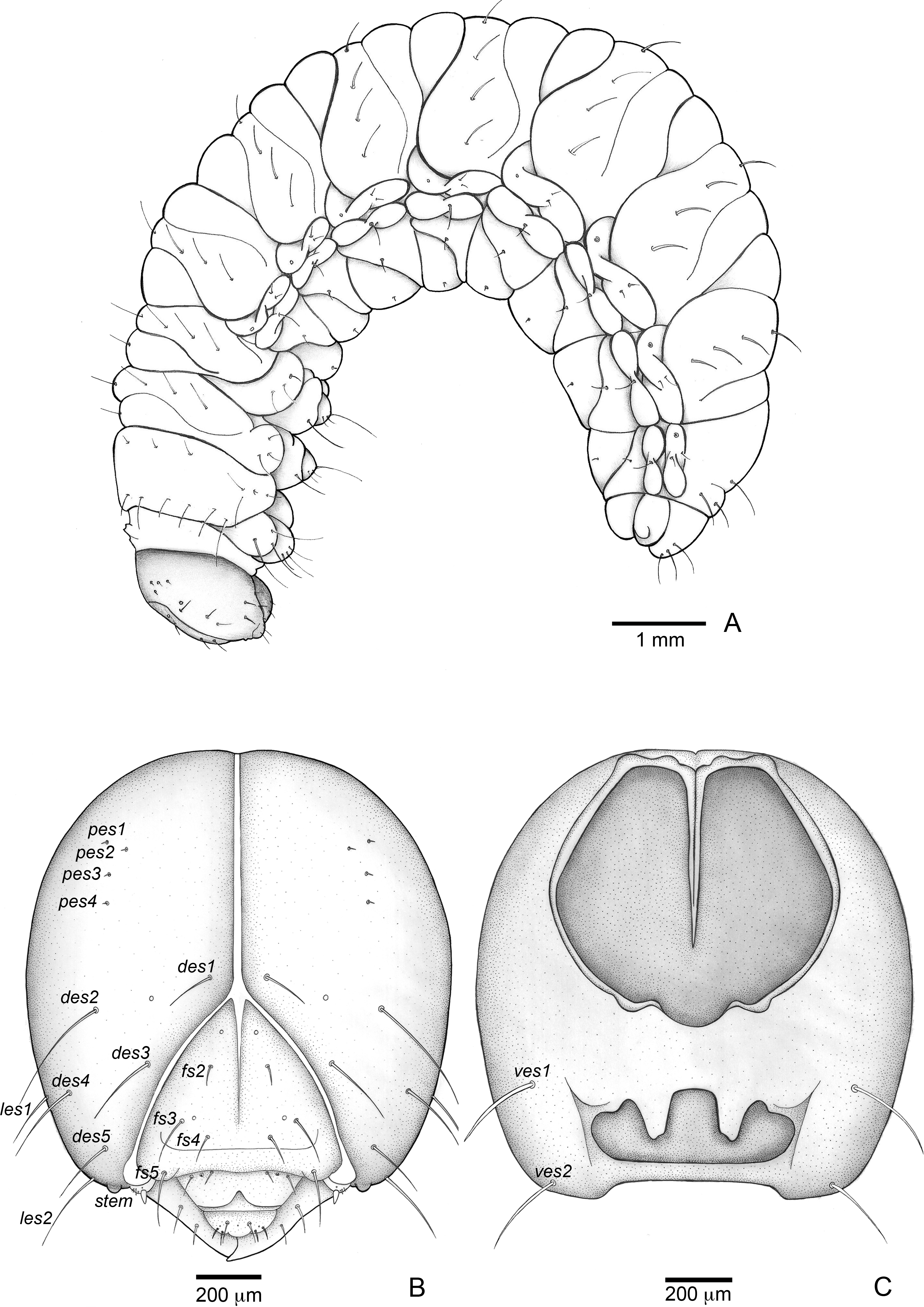
Fourth-instar larva

== Interaction with plants ==
Oviposition on palm flowers

Adults Anchylorhynchus visit male and female flowers of several palm species in the genera Syagrus, Oenocarpus and Butia. Anchylorhynchus minimus might be associated with Euterpe edulis, but this is still unconfirmed. Adults use their rostrum to open male flowers and feed on pollen. While resting, they remain in the branches of the inflorescence or hidden at its base. Unlike most Curculionidae, females do not use the rostrum to drill an oviposition hole in plant tissues. Instead, they lay eggs directly between petals and sepals of female flowers.

The first observation about natural history of Anchylorhynchus was published by Faust, who described A. burmeisteri from specimens collected from palms in Argentina. Gregório Bondar made most of the subsequent observations, recording host plants for many species. He considered A. trapezicollis to be a pest of the palm known as licuri (Syagrus coronata). He observed that adults fed on pollen and conjectured that larvae might feed on flowers, even though he never observed them. More recently, the full life cycle of A. eriospathae has been described, showing that larvae feed on developing seeds and adults on pollen. Also, species of Anchylorhynchus have been shown to be important pollinators of Oenocarpus bataua, Oenocarpus balickii, Oenocarpus minor, Butia paraguayensis and Syagrus loefgrenii.

== Taxonomy ==
There are currently 25 valid species of Anchylorhynchus.

The following list shows all valid species, with recognized synonyms shown indented:

- Anchylorhynchus aegrotus Fåhraeus, 1843
- Anchylorhynchus albidus Bondar, 1943
- Anchylorhynchus amazonicus Voss, 1943
- Anchylorhynchus bicarinatus O'Brien, 1981
  - Anchylorhynchus gottsbergerorum Vanin, 1995
- Anchylorhynchus bicolor Voss, 1943
  - Anchylorhynchus leiospathae Bondar, 1950
- Anchylorhynchus bucki Vanin, 1973
- Anchylorhynchus burmeisteri Faust, 1894
- Anchylorhynchus camposi Bondar, 1941
- Anchylorhynchus centrosquamatus de Medeiros & Núñez-Avellaneda, 2013
- Anchylorhynchus chrysomeloides de Medeiros & Vanin, 2020
- Anchylorhynchus goiano de Medeiros & Vanin, 2020
- Anchylorhynchus imitator de Medeiros & Vanin, 2020
- Anchylorhynchus latipes de Medeiros & Vanin, 2020
- Anchylorhynchus luteobrunneus de Medeiros & Núñez-Avellaneda, 2013
- Anchylorhynchus minimus Bondar, 1950
- Anchylorhynchus multisquamis de Medeiros & Vanin, 2020
- Anchylorhynchus parcus Fåhraeus, 1843
- Anchylorhynchus pinocchio de Medeiros & Núñez-Avellaneda, 2013
- Anchylorhynchus rectus de Medeiros & Vanin, 2020
- Anchylorhynchus trapezicollis Hustache, 1940
  - Anchylorhynchus bleyi Bondar, 1941
  - Anchylorhynchus botryophorae Bondar, 1941
- Anchylorhynchus tremolerasi Hustache, 1937
  - Anchylorhynchus eriospathae Bondar, 1943
  - Anchylorhynchus hatschbachi Bondar, 1943
  - Anchylorhynchus pictipennis Hustache, 1937
- Anchylorhynchus tricarinatus Vaurie, 1954
- Anchylorhynchus vanini Valente & de Medeiros, 2013
- Anchylorhynchus variabilis Gyllenhaal, 1836
  - Anchylorhynchus mutabilis Fåhraeus, 1843
    - Anchylorhynchus mutabilis connata Voss, 1943
- Anchylorhynchus vittipennis Voss, 1943
  - Anchylorhynchus nigripennis Voss, 1943
  - Anchylorhynchus lineatus Bondar, 1943
