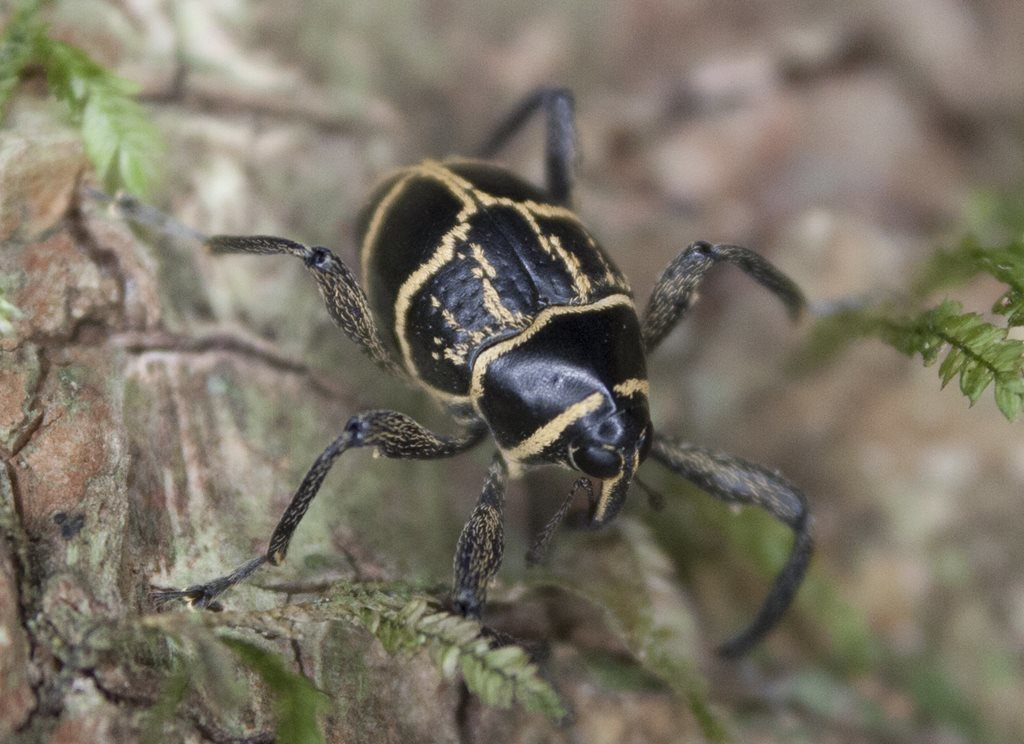
- Enteles vigorsii

Scientific classification
- Kingdom: Animalia
- Phylum: Arthropoda
- Class: Insecta
- Order: Coleoptera
- Suborder: Polyphaga
- Infraorder: Cucujiformia
- Family: Curculionidae
- Subfamily: Cryptorhynchinae
- Genus: Enteles; Schoenherr, 1837

Type species
- Enteles vigorsii Gyllenhal, 1837

= Enteles =

Genus of insects

Enteles is a genus of weevil in the family Curculionidae, first described by Carl Johan Schönherr in 1837. The type species is Enteles vigorsii. The name derives from the Greek εντελησ, which means "complete" or "perfect".

== Species ==
- Enteles bicolor (Dimorphothynnus bicolor is now the accepted name)
- Enteles ocellatus (accepted as Perissops ocellatus)
- Enteles vicinus
- Enteles vigorsii
