= Vaurie =

Vaurie is a surname of French origin. Notable people with the surname include:

- Charles Vaurie (1906–1975), French-born American ornithologist
- Patricia Vaurie (1909–1982), American entomologist
