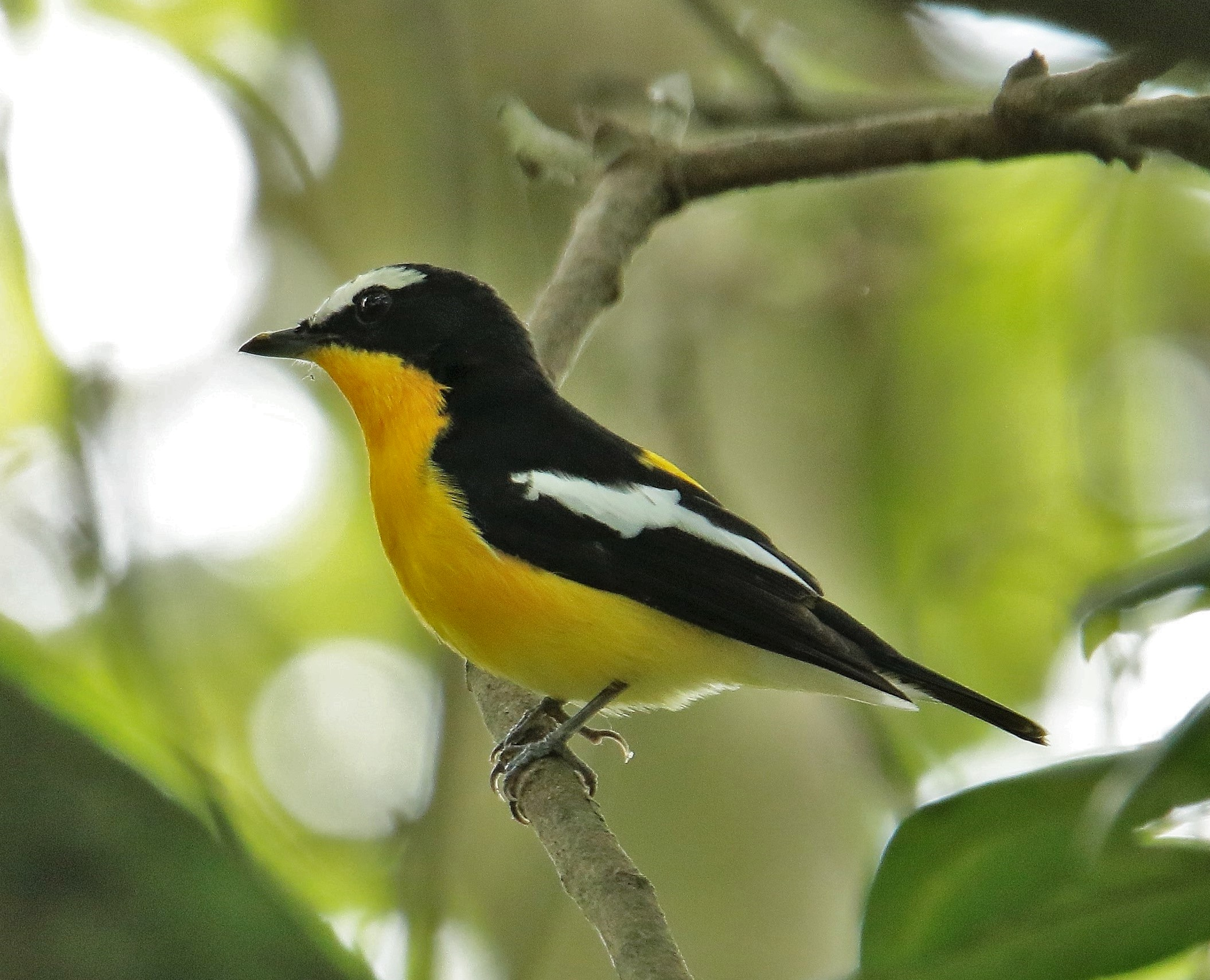
- Adult male
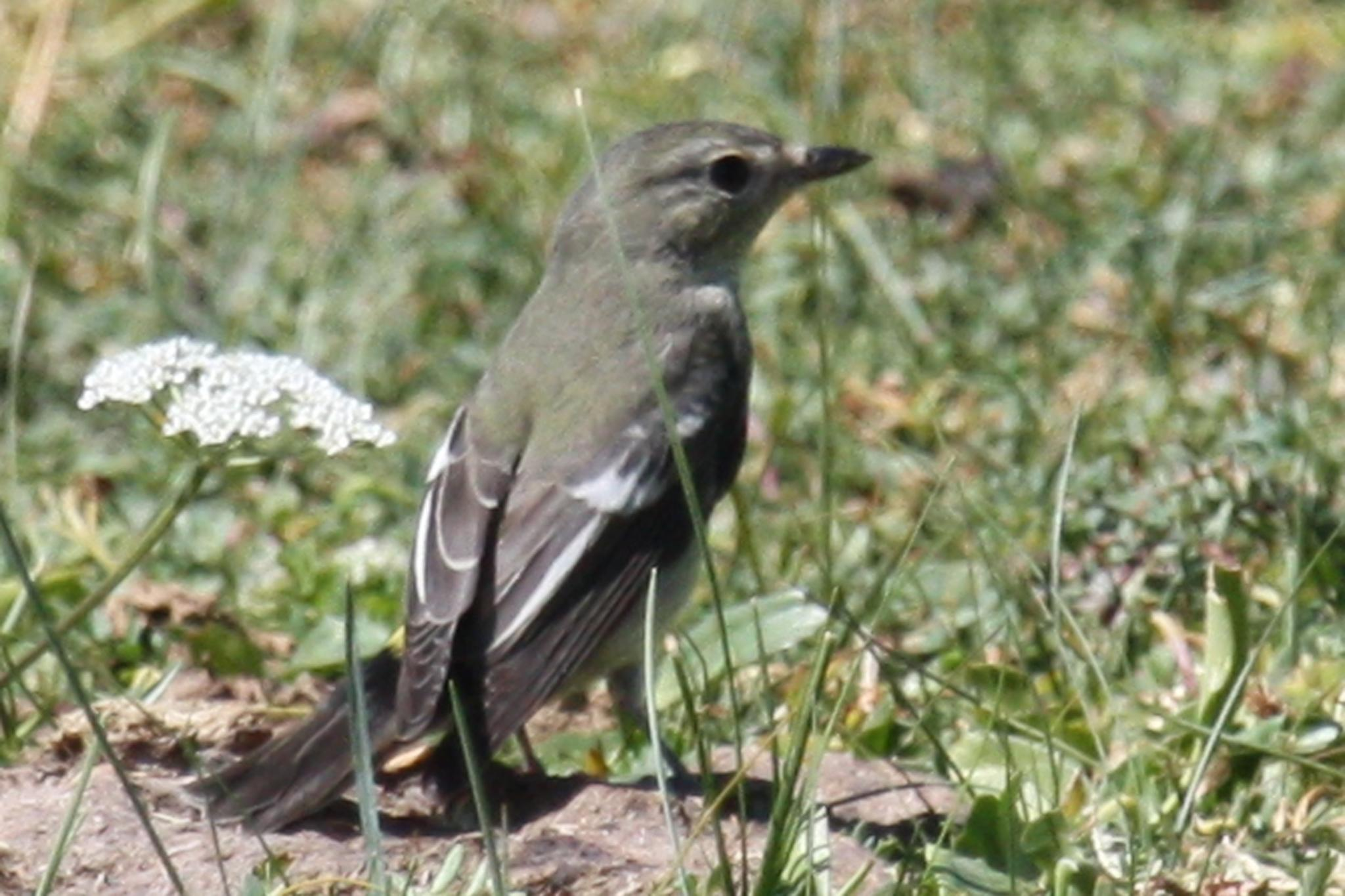
- Adult female (Mongolia)

Conservation status
- Least Concern (IUCN 3.1)

Scientific classification
- Kingdom: Animalia
- Phylum: Chordata
- Class: Aves
- Order: Passeriformes
- Family: Muscicapidae
- Genus: Ficedula
- Species: F. zanthopygia

Binomial name
- Ficedula zanthopygia (Hay, 1845)
- Distribution of various Ficedula species (Wintering grounds of F. zanthopygia in blue)

Synonyms
- Xanthopygia tricolor (Hartlaub, 1845); Muscicapa zanthopygia Hay, 1845

= Yellow-rumped flycatcher =

Species of bird

The yellow-rumped flycatcher (Ficedula zanthopygia), also known as Korean flycatcher or tricolor flycatcher, is a species of flycatcher found in eastern Asia. A distinctive species with almost no look-alike other than the narcissus flycatcher. It breeds in eastern Asia including parts of Mongolia, Transbaikal, southern China, Korea and western Japan. They winter in parts of the Malay Peninsula and South Asia.

== Identification ==
Both male (right) and female (left) have the yellow rump

In all plumages the yellow rump is distinctive. The white supercilium of the male is distinctive, separating it from the narcissus flycatcher and the green-backed flycatcher. Females and first year males are olive grey above with blackish tail. Hartert (1910) treated this species as a member of the narcissina group. Some individuals with yellow supercilium have been considered as hybrids with the narcissus flycatcher. Included in this species complex was the species called Elise's flycatcher, usually treated as a subspecies of the narcissus flycatcher. Both elisae and zanthopygia have been observed to breed separately in the same area of oak forest near Peking strengthening the case for their distinctness. There are also clear call and morphological differences between the two. The genus Muscicapa has been considered polyphyletic and is still in the process of being resolved, although the genus Ficedula is now considered monophyletic with their origins in east Asia and diversification following climate changes in the Pliocene. Males have black upperparts with a white supercilium and wingpatch, rich yellow underparts and rump. Females are greyish or olive-green above, paler below, with wingbar and yellow rump. They may show yellow on the throat.

== Ecology ==
- - Ficedula tricolor
  - - - Ficedula narcissina
      - Ficedula zanthopygia
    - - Ficedula mugimaki
      - - - Ficedula crypta
          - - Ficedula timorensis
            - Ficedula harterti
        - - Ficedula dumetoria
          - Ficedula platenae

Relationships with other species

The breeding area of the species is in Manchuria, Korea and China. The nesting in Xiaoxingan region is mainly in May and June. They breed mainly in low valleys at the base of hills. The home range of a pair can be about 2000-5000 sq. m. The nest is built in about three to four days by the female alone. The clutch is 4-7 eggs which are incubated by the female alone for about 11–12 days. The adults forage within about 70 metres (230 ft) of the nest to feed the chicks. The young fledge after 14–15 days. It was first noted to winter in central India in 1989, it has since been found to winter in southwestern India and Sri Lanka.

A species of ectoparasitic feather mite, Proterothrix megacaula was first discovered and described from the body of a yellow-rumped flycatcher in China.
