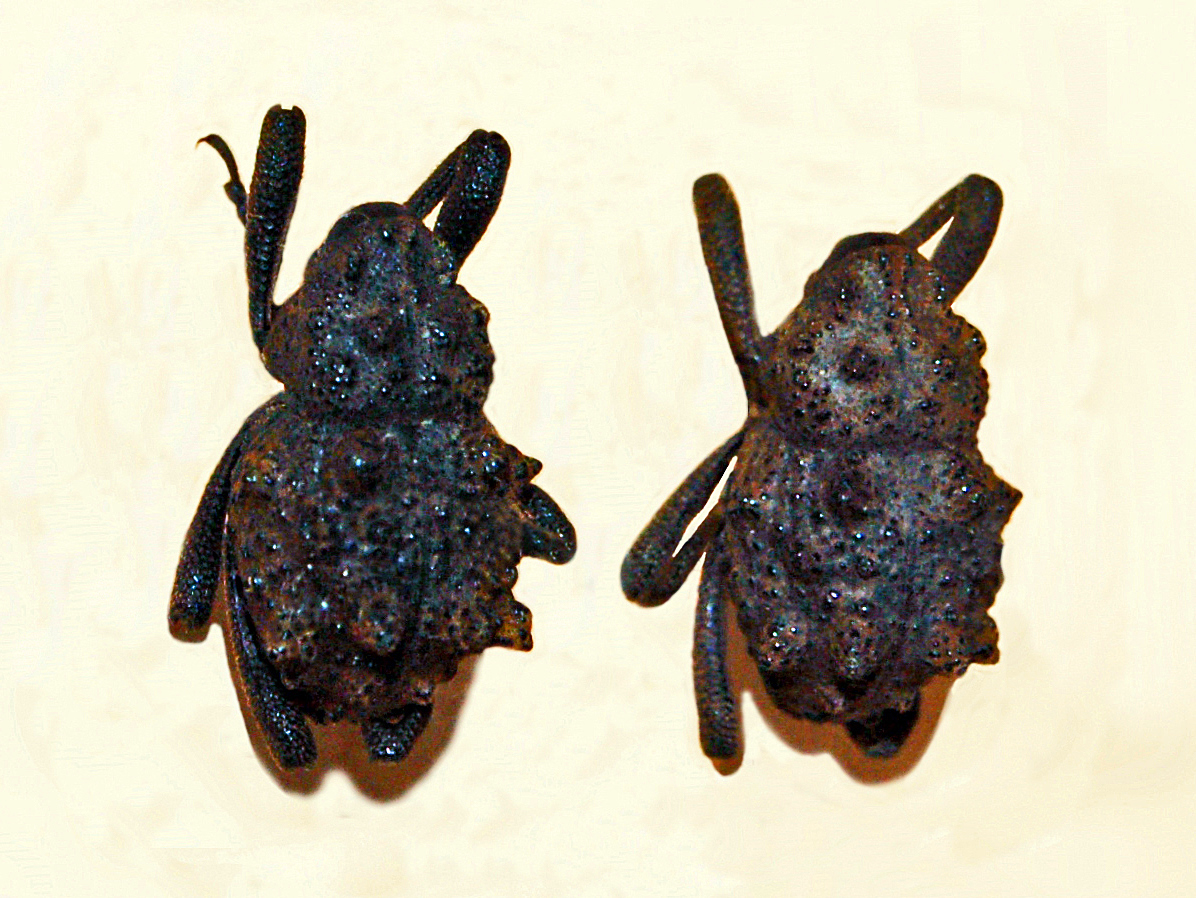
- Poropterus solidus from New Guinea

Scientific classification
- Kingdom: Animalia
- Phylum: Arthropoda
- Class: Insecta
- Order: Coleoptera
- Suborder: Polyphaga
- Infraorder: Cucujiformia
- Family: Curculionidae
- Genus: Poropterus
- Species: P. solidus

Binomial name
- Poropterus solidus Faust, 1898

= Poropterus solidus =

Species of beetle

Poropterus solidus is a species of the family Curculionidae.

== Description ==
The basic colour is black or brown. The elytra and the pronotum are covered by tubercles.

== Distribution ==
This species can be found in New Guinea (Moroka, Paumomu River).
