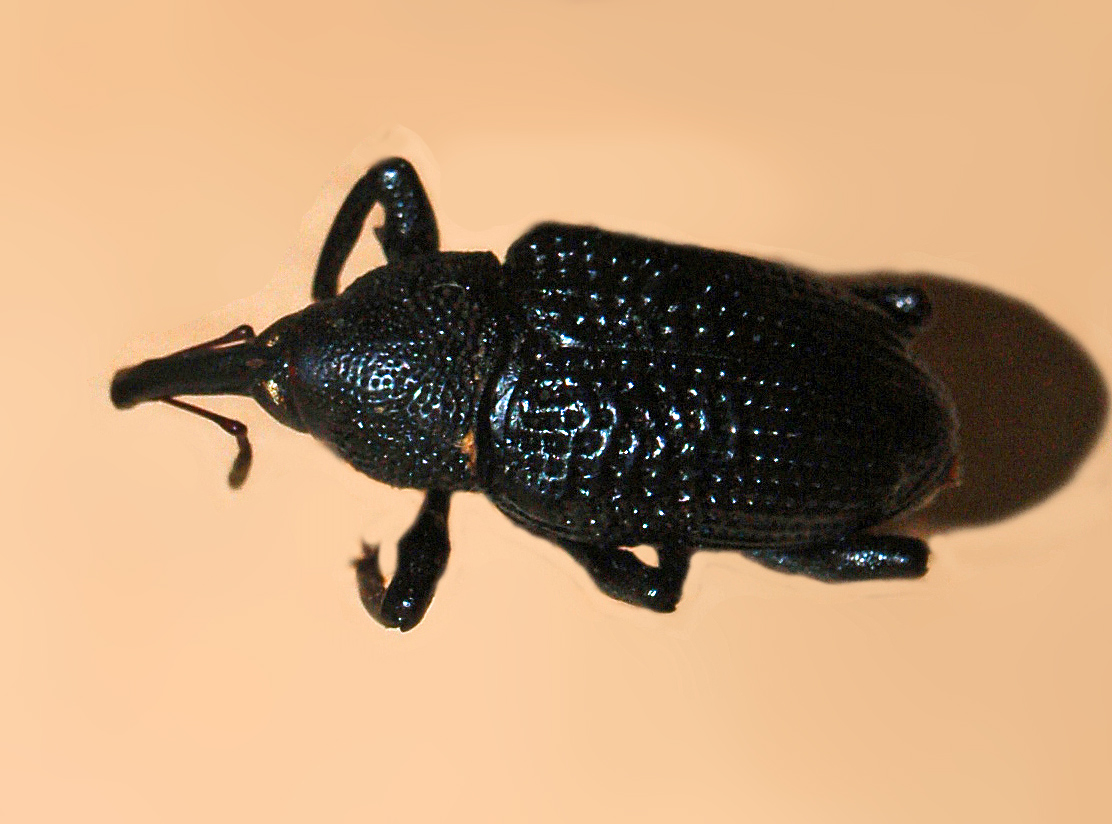
- Alcides porosus from Sarawak

Scientific classification
- Kingdom: Animalia
- Phylum: Arthropoda
- Class: Insecta
- Order: Coleoptera
- Suborder: Polyphaga
- Infraorder: Cucujiformia
- Family: Curculionidae
- Genus: Alcidodes
- Species: A. porosus

Binomial name
- Alcidodes porosus Faust, 1894

= Alcidodes porosus =

Species of beetle

Alcidodes porosus is a species of beetles belonging to the true weevil family. It is found in Indonesia.
