= Enteles vicinus =

Scientific classification
- Kingdom: Animalia
- Phylum: Arthropoda
- Clade: Pancrustacea
- Class: Insecta
- Order: Coleoptera
- Suborder: Polyphaga
- Infraorder: Cucujiformia
- Superfamily: Curculionoidea
- Family: Curculionidae
- Genus: Enteles
- Species: E. vicinus

Binomial name
- Enteles vicinus Faust, 1888

Species of weevil

Enteles vicinus is a weevil in the Curculionidae family, which is found in north Queensland.

It was first described by Johannes Faust in 1888.
