= Vanin =

Vanin, feminine: Vanina is a Russian surname derived from the given name Vanya. Notable people with the surname include:

- Eugenia Vanina, Russian indologist
- Feodosy Vanin (1914–2009), Soviet marathon runner
- Mikhail Vanin
- Ronaldo Vanin (born 1983), Brazilian footballer
- Sergio Antonio Vanin
- Vasili Vasilyevich Vanin (1898–1951), Russian stage and film actor of the Soviet era.
- Volodymyr Vanin

== See also ==
- Vanina (given name)
- Venin, Iran, village in Isfahan Province, Iran, may also be Romanized as Vanīn
