= Vanina (given name) =

Vanina is a feminine given name. Notable people with the name include:

- Vanina Correa (born 1983), Argentine footballer
- Vanina García Sokol (born 1983), Argentine tennis player
- Vanina Ickx (born 1975), Belgian race car driver
- Vanina Oneto (born 1973), Argentine field hockey player
- Vanina Paoletti (born 1997), French canoeist
- Vanina Paoli-Gagin (born 1967), French politician
- Vanina Ruhlmann-Kleider (born 1961), French physicist
- Vanina Sánchez (born 1979), Argentine taekwondo competitor

Fictional characters with the name include:

- Vanina, the main character of 1922 German silent film Vanina
- Vanina Vanini, the main character of 1829 Stendhal short story Vanina Vanini

== See also ==
- Vanin/Vanina, Russian surname
- Vanina, Kursk Oblast, village in Russia
