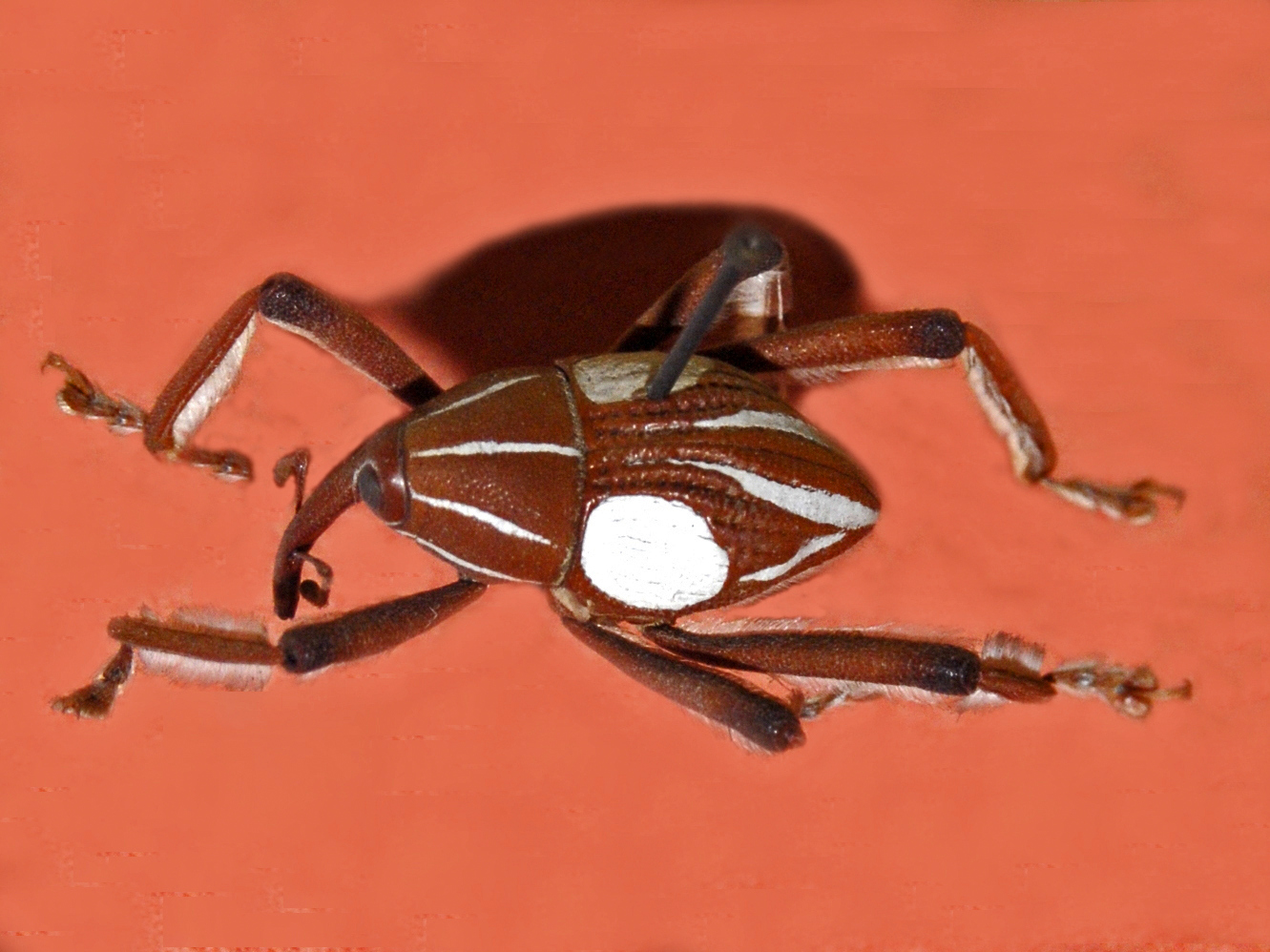
- Museum specimen of Alcidodes richteri

Scientific classification
- Domain: Eukaryota
- Kingdom: Animalia
- Phylum: Arthropoda
- Class: Insecta
- Order: Coleoptera
- Suborder: Polyphaga
- Infraorder: Cucujiformia
- Family: Curculionidae
- Genus: Alcidodes
- Species: A. richteri

Binomial name
- Alcidodes richteri Faust, 1892

= Alcidodes richteri =

Species of beetle

Alcidodes richteri is a species of the true weevil family.
