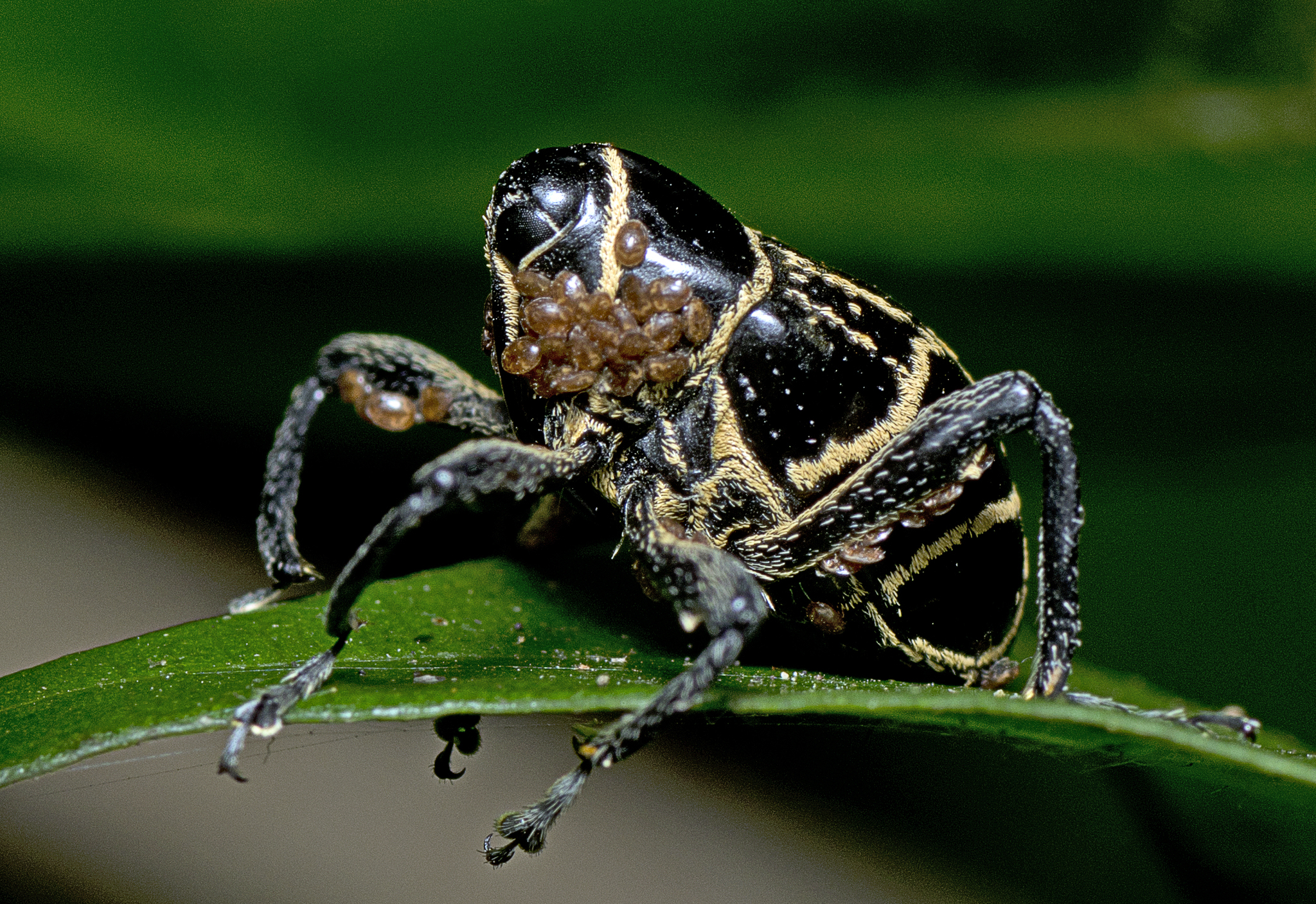

Scientific classification
- Kingdom: Animalia
- Phylum: Arthropoda
- Clade: Pancrustacea
- Class: Insecta
- Order: Coleoptera
- Suborder: Polyphaga
- Infraorder: Cucujiformia
- Superfamily: Curculionoidea
- Family: Curculionidae
- Genus: Enteles
- Species: E. vigorsii

Binomial name
- Enteles vigorsii Gyllenhal, 1837

= Enteles vigorsii =

Species of weevil

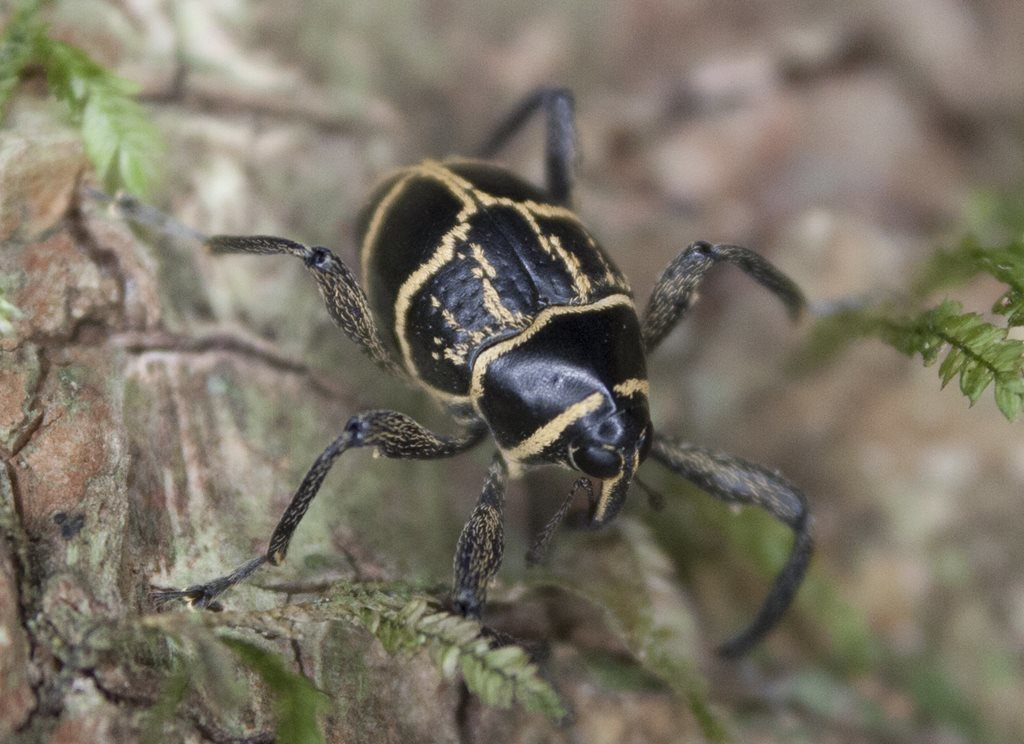

Enteles vigorsii is a weevil in the Curculionidae family, which is found on the east coast of Australia.

These weevils have been found in the reproductive structures of cycads and are thought to assist in their pollination.

The species was first described by Leonard Gyllenhaal in 1837, who authored the description within Carl Johan Schönherr's 1837 tome on the Curculionidae.
