= Alcidodes virgatus =

Scientific classification
- Kingdom: Animalia
- Phylum: Arthropoda
- Class: Insecta
- Order: Coleoptera
- Suborder: Polyphaga
- Infraorder: Cucujiformia
- Family: Curculionidae
- Genus: Alcidodes
- Species: A. virgatus

Binomial name
- Alcidodes virgatus Haaf, 1960

Species of beetle

Alcidodes virgatus, is a species of weevil found in Sri Lanka.
