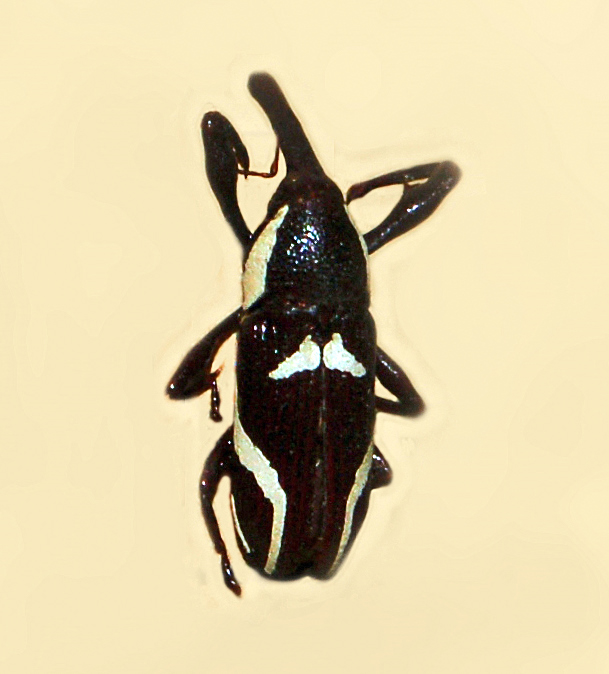
- Alcides elegans from Papua New Guinea

Scientific classification
- Kingdom: Animalia
- Phylum: Arthropoda
- Clade: Pancrustacea
- Class: Insecta
- Order: Coleoptera
- Suborder: Polyphaga
- Infraorder: Cucujiformia
- Superfamily: Curculionoidea
- Family: Curculionidae
- Genus: Alcidodes
- Species: A. elegans

Binomial name
- Alcidodes elegans Guérin-Méneville, 1838

= Alcidodes elegans =

Species of beetle

Alcidodes elegans is a species of the true weevil family. It occurs in Papua New Guinea
