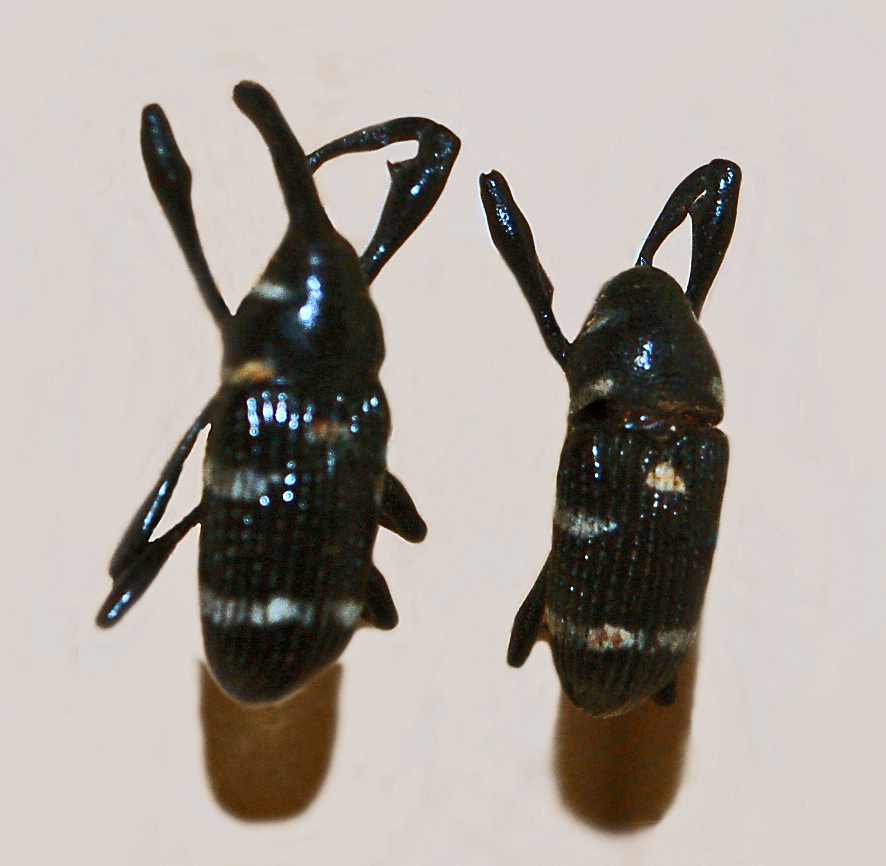
- Alcidodes albocinctus from Maluku Islands. Male and female

Scientific classification
- Kingdom: Animalia
- Phylum: Arthropoda
- Clade: Pancrustacea
- Class: Insecta
- Order: Coleoptera
- Suborder: Polyphaga
- Infraorder: Cucujiformia
- Superfamily: Curculionoidea
- Family: Curculionidae
- Genus: Alcidodes
- Species: A. albocinctus

Binomial name
- Alcidodes albocinctus Blanchard, 1853

= Alcidodes albocinctus =

Species of beetle

Alcidodes albocinctus is a species of the true weevil family.
