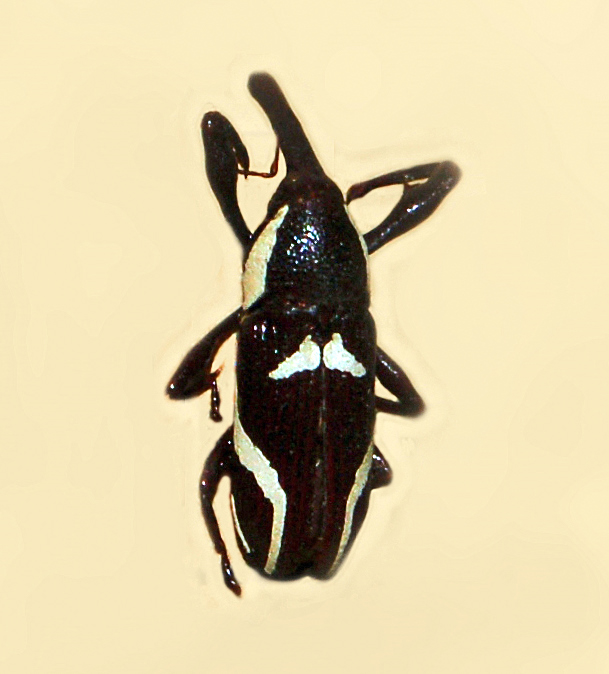
- Alcidodes elegans from Papua New Guinea

Scientific classification
- Kingdom: Animalia
- Phylum: Arthropoda
- Clade: Pancrustacea
- Class: Insecta
- Order: Coleoptera
- Suborder: Polyphaga
- Infraorder: Cucujiformia
- Family: Curculionidae
- Subfamily: Molytinae
- Tribe: Mecysolobini
- Genus: Alcidodes; Marshall, 1939

Synonyms
- Alcides Schoenherr, 1825 (preoccupied by Alcides Hübner, 1822)

= Alcidodes =

Genus of beetles

Alcidodes is a genus of weevils in the family Curculionidae.

== Species ==
Species in the genus include:

- Alcidodes adustus Haaf, 1961
- Alcidodes agnatus Haaf, 1964
- Alcidodes albocinctus Blanchard, 1853
- Alcidodes alienus Haaf, 1961
- Alcidodes amandus Haaf, 1961
- Alcidodes amplus Haaf, 1961
- Alcidodes angustus Haaf, 1961
- Alcidodes arcanus Haaf, 1964
- Alcidodes artivittis Marshall, 1948
- Alcidodes asperatus Haaf, 1963
- Alcidodes avidus Haaf, 1964
- Alcidodes balachowskyi Hoffmann, 1962
- Alcidodes barbaricus Haaf, 1964
- Alcidodes basipennis Marshall, 1948
- Alcidodes baueri Haaf, 1963
- Alcidodes beatus Haaf, 1964
- Alcidodes biplagiatus Haaf, 1961
- Alcidodes blandus Haaf, 1963
- Alcidodes bruniqueli Roudier, 1957
- Alcidodes candidulatus Haaf, 1961
- Alcidodes carus Haaf, 1961
- Alcidodes castus Haaf, 1961
- Alcidodes caviventris Lyal, 2000
- Alcidodes cervinus Haaf, 1963
- Alcidodes comptus Haaf, 1960
- Alcidodes confusus Haaf, 1963
- Alcidodes connexus Haaf, 1964
- Alcidodes convexus (A.G.Olivier, 1791)
- Alcidodes cultratus Haaf, 1964
- Alcidodes cupidus Haaf, 1961
- Alcidodes curranae Lyal, 2000
- Alcidodes curtirostris Haaf, 1962
- Alcidodes curtus Haaf, 1964
- Alcidodes curvirostris Lyal, 2000
- Alcidodes daitoanus Kôno, 1942
- Alcidodes decretus Haaf, 1961
- Alcidodes delicatulus Haaf, 1961
- Alcidodes densus Haaf, 1963
- Alcidodes desertus Haaf, 1961
- Alcidodes diabolicus Haaf, 1961
- Alcidodes didymus Haaf, 1964
- Alcidodes dignus Haaf, 1961
- Alcidodes distinctus Haaf, 1961
- Alcidodes diversus Haaf, 1961
- Alcidodes drescheri Haaf, 1964
- Alcidodes effertus Haaf, 1964
- Alcidodes egregius Haaf, 1961
- Alcidodes elegans Guérin-Méneville, 1838
- Alcidodes eremitus Haaf, 1963
- Alcidodes erosus Haaf, 1960
- Alcidodes eruditus Haaf, 1961
- Alcidodes eugeniophilus Lyal, 1996
- Alcidodes excellens Haaf, 1961
- Alcidodes exornatus Chevrolat, 1880
- Alcidodes expansitarsis Lyal, 1996
- Alcidodes expansus Haaf, 1964
- Alcidodes fabricii (J.C.Fabricius, 1798)
- Alcidodes facetus Haaf, 1961
- Alcidodes falsus Haaf, 1964
- Alcidodes farinosus Haaf, 1961
- Alcidodes fervidus Haaf, 1961
- Alcidodes firmus Haaf, 1963
- Alcidodes flavoguttatus Marshall, 1939
- Alcidodes fornicatus Haaf, 1961
- Alcidodes fossor Haaf, 1964
- Alcidodes franzi Hoffmann, 1965
- Alcidodes freudei Haaf, 1963
- Alcidodes frigidus Haaf, 1961
- Alcidodes fugitus Lyal, 2000
- Alcidodes fulvocinctus Marshall, 1958
- Alcidodes generosus Haaf, 1964
- Alcidodes gibbipennis Haaf, 1961
- Alcidodes glabratus Haaf, 1962
- Alcidodes gonzoi Lyal, 2000
- Alcidodes graniger Haaf, 1961
- Alcidodes gymnasticus Lyal, 1996
- Alcidodes harmonicus Haaf, 1961
- Alcidodes herteli Haaf, 1963
- Alcidodes hispidus Haaf, 1961
- Alcidodes hoplomachus Lyal, 2000
- Alcidodes hospitus Haaf, 1964
- Alcidodes humatus Haaf, 1961
- Alcidodes humeralis Heller, 1940
- Alcidodes imitator Haaf, 1964
- Alcidodes immutatus Haaf, 1961
- Alcidodes indubitus Haaf, 1961
- Alcidodes inops Haaf, 1964
- Alcidodes inquietus Haaf, 1961
- Alcidodes janetae Lyal, 1996
- Alcidodes jucundus Haaf, 1961
- Alcidodes juglans Chao, 1980
- Alcidodes karelini Boheman
- Alcidodes korotyaevi Egorov, 1977
- Alcidodes lascivus Haaf, 1963
- Alcidodes lautus Haaf, 1961
- Alcidodes leechi Haaf, 1962
- Alcidodes lemniscatus Haaf, 1964
- Alcidodes lepidus Haaf, 1963
- Alcidodes leucospilus Erichson, 1834
- Alcidodes liae Alonso-Zarazaga, 2013
- Alcidodes liciatus Haaf, 1962
- Alcidodes lugubris Haaf, 1961
- Alcidodes macellus Haaf, 1962
- Alcidodes magnificus Haaf, 1960
- Alcidodes major Haaf, 1964
- Alcidodes micranthiphilus Lyal, 2000
- Alcidodes mirandus Haaf, 1961
- Alcidodes monstratus Haaf, 1964
- Alcidodes montanus Haaf, 1964
- Alcidodes morosus Haaf, 1964
- Alcidodes morulus Haaf, 1961
- Alcidodes murranus Marshall, 1942
- Alcidodes muticus Haaf, 1961
- Alcidodes nanus Haaf, 1964
- Alcidodes natalensis Haaf, 1961
- Alcidodes nigricollis Haaf, 1964
- Alcidodes nigritus Haaf, 1963
- Alcidodes nigrovinculatus Heller, 1940
- Alcidodes notabilis Haaf, 1961
- Alcidodes novellus Haaf, 1963
- Alcidodes nubilus Marshall, 1955
- Alcidodes nudiusculus Haaf, 1962
- Alcidodes ochraceus Haaf, 1963
- Alcidodes omissus Haaf, 1963
- Alcidodes opacus Haaf, 1963
- Alcidodes opulentus Haaf, 1961
- Alcidodes ornatus Haaf, 1961
- Alcidodes ostentatus Haaf, 1964
- Alcidodes paetus Haaf, 1961
- Alcidodes paradictodes Haaf, 1961
- Alcidodes parnassius Haaf, 1964
- Alcidodes paucus Haaf, 1961
- Alcidodes pauxillus Haaf, 1962
- Alcidodes perditor Haaf, 1963
- Alcidodes peregrinus Haaf, 1961
- Alcidodes personatus Haaf, 1964
- Alcidodes pindicus Haaf, 1961
- Alcidodes platysomus Haaf, 1963
- Alcidodes porosus Faust, 1894
- Alcidodes posticus Haaf, 1961
- Alcidodes praevius Haaf, 1963
- Alcidodes pretiosus Haaf, 1963
- Alcidodes profanus Haaf, 1961
- Alcidodes prolixus Haaf, 1963
- Alcidodes pulchellus Haaf, 1964
- Alcidodes pullus Haaf, 1961
- Alcidodes pumilus Haaf, 1962
- Alcidodes putus Haaf, 1964
- Alcidodes ramezei Lyal, 2000
- Alcidodes ramosus Haaf, 1963
- Alcidodes rectus Haaf, 1963
- Alcidodes reductus Haaf, 1963
- Alcidodes relictus Haaf, 1961
- Alcidodes remotus Haaf, 1961
- Alcidodes richteri Faust, 1892
- Alcidodes rotundulus Haaf, 1961
- Alcidodes ryoichii Kôno, 1942
- Alcidodes salebrosus Haaf, 1961
- Alcidodes sanctus Haaf, 1961
- Alcidodes saturnus Haaf, 1961
- Alcidodes scitus Haaf, 1963
- Alcidodes sedulus Haaf, 1964
- Alcidodes sejugatus Haaf, 1964
- Alcidodes semiroseus Hustache, 1956
- Alcidodes separandus Haaf, 1961
- Alcidodes serius Haaf, 1961
- Alcidodes serotinus Haaf, 1961
- Alcidodes shoreaphilus Lyal, 2000
- Alcidodes siccus Haaf, 1964
- Alcidodes signatus (Boheman 1836)
- Alcidodes simmondsi Haaf, 1963
- Alcidodes sobrinus Haaf, 1961
- Alcidodes solitarius Haaf, 1964
- Alcidodes sordidus Haaf, 1961
- Alcidodes speciosus Haaf, 1964
- Alcidodes speculator Haaf, 1963
- Alcidodes sterryorum Lyal, 2000
- Alcidodes stolzi Haaf, 1961
- Alcidodes supernus Haaf, 1964
- Alcidodes suratus Haaf, 1961
- Alcidodes tamsi Marshall, 1954
- Alcidodes tectus Haaf, 1961
- Alcidodes tenellus Haaf, 1962
- Alcidodes tentus Haaf, 1961
- Alcidodes terrosus Haaf, 1963
- Alcidodes tersus Haaf, 1963
- Alcidodes texatus Haaf, 1960
- Alcidodes themus Lyal, 2000
- Alcidodes thompsoni Haaf, 1962
- Alcidodes toyi Lyal, 2000
- Alcidodes tricolor Heller, 1940
- Alcidodes tumidus Haaf, 1961
- Alcidodes typicus Haaf, 1964
- Alcidodes umbrifer Haaf, 1963
- Alcidodes vadoni Hustache, 1956
- Alcidodes vafer Marshall, 1955
- Alcidodes vaticus Lyal, 2000
- Alcidodes venustus Haaf, 1964
- Alcidodes vernicatus Haaf, 1961
- Alcidodes vicarius Haaf, 1961
- Alcidodes vicinus Haaf, 1961
- Alcidodes virgatus Haaf, 1960
- Alcidodes vitellus Haaf, 1961
- Alcidodes vitiosus Haaf, 1964
- Alcidodes vividus Haaf, 1961
- Alcidodes vossi Haaf, 1962
- Alcidodes walliorum Lyal, 2000
- Alcidodes wirthi Haaf, 1964
