= Alcidodes lugubris =

Scientific classification
- Kingdom: Animalia
- Phylum: Arthropoda
- Class: Insecta
- Order: Coleoptera
- Suborder: Polyphaga
- Infraorder: Cucujiformia
- Family: Curculionidae
- Genus: Alcidodes
- Species: A. lugubris

Binomial name
- Alcidodes lugubris Haaf, 1961

Species of beetle

Alcidodes lugubris, is a species of weevil found in Sri Lanka.
