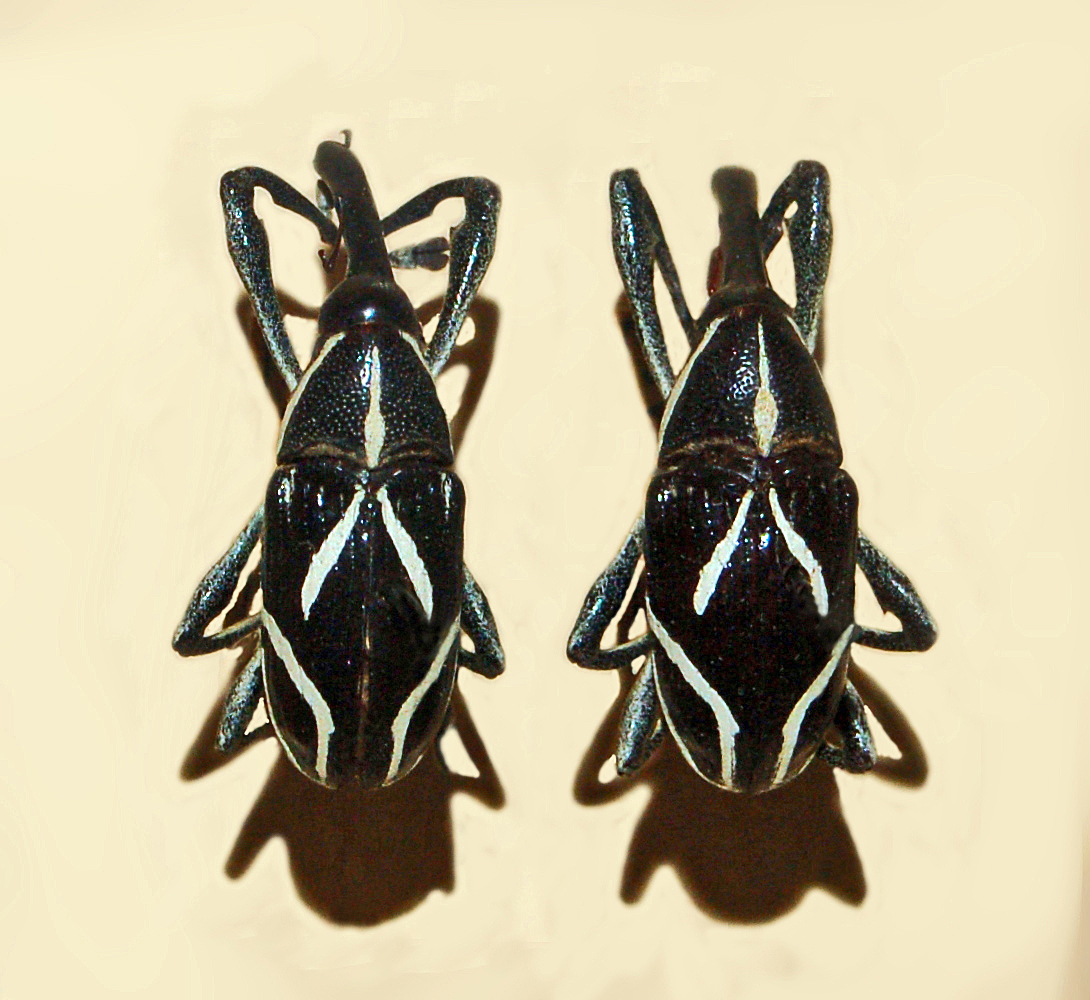
- Alcidodes exornatus from Papua New Guinea

Scientific classification
- Kingdom: Animalia
- Phylum: Arthropoda
- Clade: Pancrustacea
- Class: Insecta
- Order: Coleoptera
- Suborder: Polyphaga
- Infraorder: Cucujiformia
- Superfamily: Curculionoidea
- Family: Curculionidae
- Genus: Alcidodes
- Species: A. exornatus

Binomial name
- Alcidodes exornatus Chevrolat, 1880

= Alcidodes exornatus =

Species of beetle

Alcidodes exornatus is a species of the true weevil family. It occurs in Papua New Guinea
