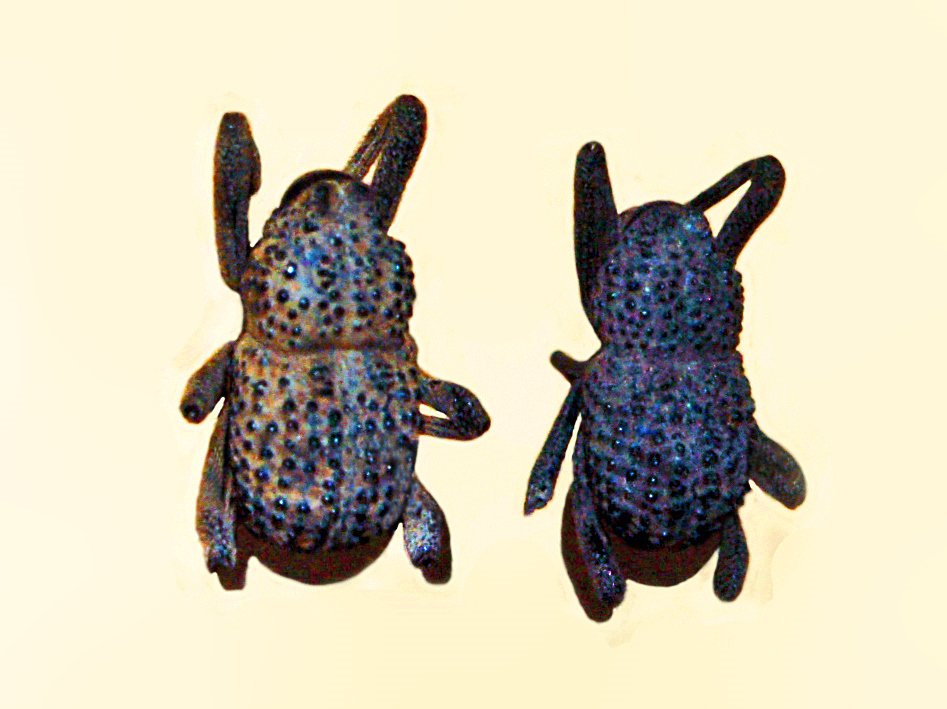
- Poropterus gemmifer from New Guinea

Scientific classification
- Kingdom: Animalia
- Phylum: Arthropoda
- Class: Insecta
- Order: Coleoptera
- Suborder: Polyphaga
- Infraorder: Cucujiformia
- Family: Curculionidae
- Genus: Poropterus
- Species: P. gemmifer

Binomial name
- Poropterus gemmifer Pascoe, 1885

= Poropterus gemmifer =

Species of beetle

Poropterus gemmifer is a species of true weevil family.

== Description ==
The basic colour is black or brown. The elytra and the pronotum are covered by small glossy tubercles.

== Distribution ==
This species can be found in New Guinea.
