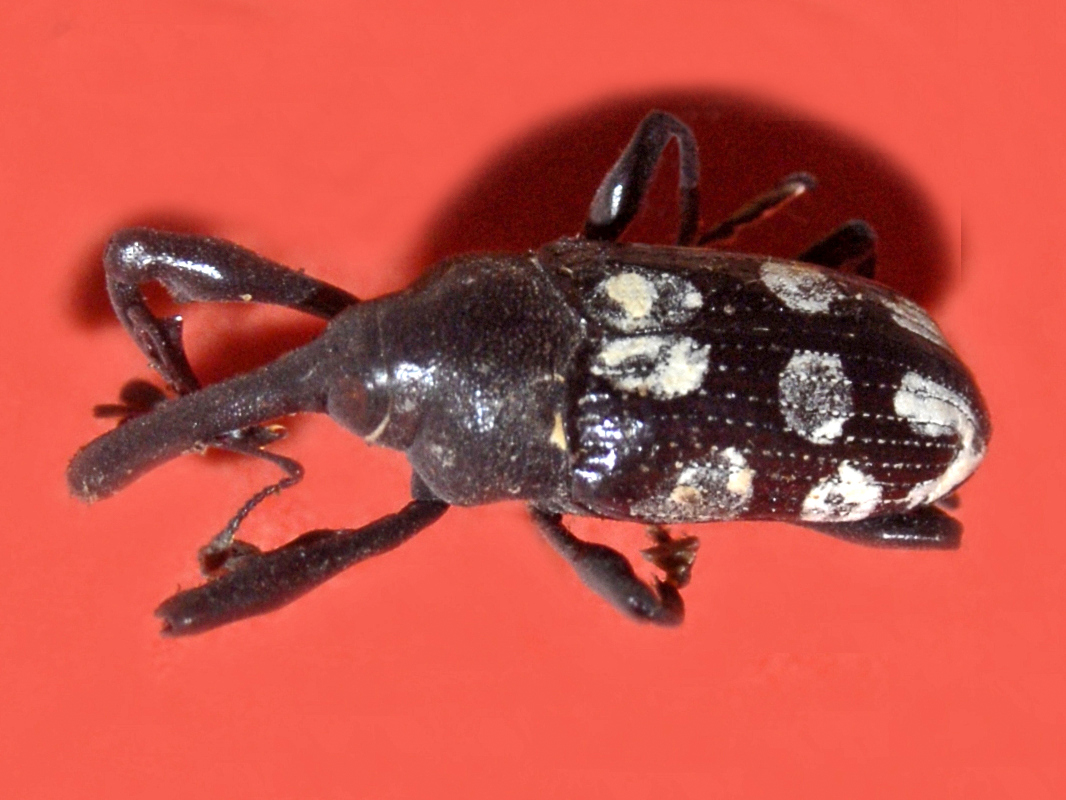
- Museum specimen of Alcidodes leucospilus

Scientific classification
- Kingdom: Animalia
- Phylum: Arthropoda
- Class: Insecta
- Order: Coleoptera
- Suborder: Polyphaga
- Infraorder: Cucujiformia
- Family: Curculionidae
- Genus: Alcidodes
- Species: A. leucospilus

Binomial name
- Alcidodes leucospilus Erichson, 1834

= Alcidodes leucospilus =

Species of beetle

Alcidodes leucospilus is a species of the true weevil family.
