= Alcidodes magnificus =

Scientific classification
- Kingdom: Animalia
- Phylum: Arthropoda
- Class: Insecta
- Order: Coleoptera
- Suborder: Polyphaga
- Infraorder: Cucujiformia
- Family: Curculionidae
- Genus: Alcidodes
- Species: A. magnificus

Binomial name
- Alcidodes magnificus Haaf, 1960

Species of beetle

Alcidodes magnificus, is a species of weevil found in Sri Lanka.

== Description ==
This small, slender species has a body length is about 4.8 to 6 mm.
