= Alcidodes notabilis =

Scientific classification
- Kingdom: Animalia
- Phylum: Arthropoda
- Class: Insecta
- Order: Coleoptera
- Suborder: Polyphaga
- Infraorder: Cucujiformia
- Family: Curculionidae
- Genus: Alcidodes
- Species: A. notabilis

Binomial name
- Alcidodes notabilis Haaf, 1961

Species of beetle

Alcidodes notabilis, is a species of weevil found in Sri Lanka.
