= Alcidodes comptus =

Scientific classification
- Kingdom: Animalia
- Phylum: Arthropoda
- Class: Insecta
- Order: Coleoptera
- Suborder: Polyphaga
- Infraorder: Cucujiformia
- Family: Curculionidae
- Genus: Alcidodes
- Species: A. comptus

Binomial name
- Alcidodes comptus Haaf, 1960

Species of beetle

Alcidodes comptus, is a species of weevil found in Sri Lanka.

== Description ==
Typical body length is about 5.5 to 6.5 mm.
