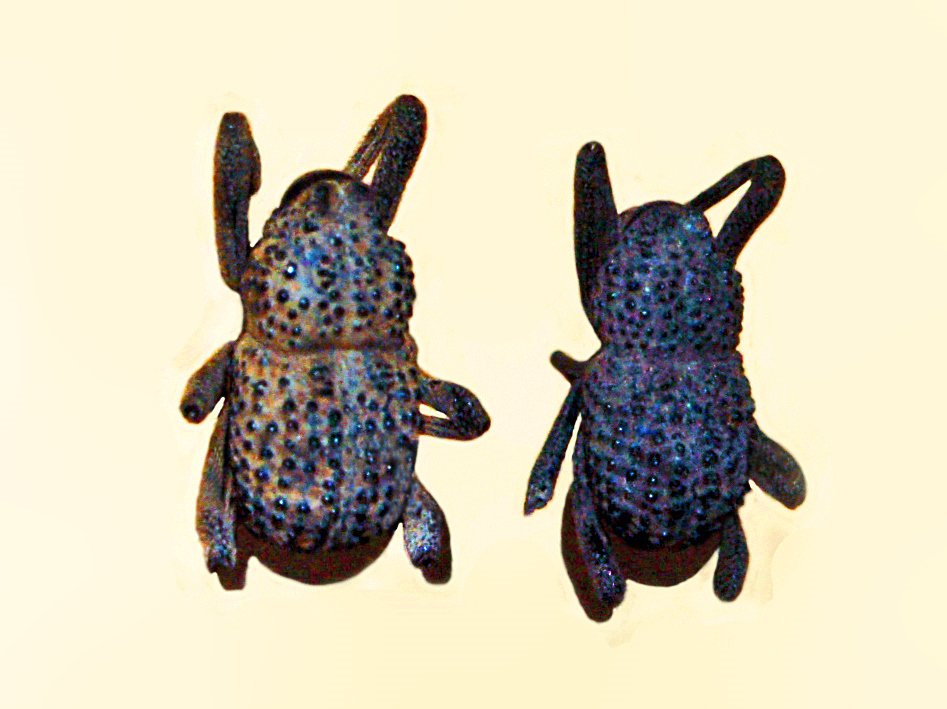
- Poropterus gemmifer from New Guinea

Scientific classification
- Kingdom: Animalia
- Phylum: Arthropoda
- Class: Insecta
- Order: Coleoptera
- Suborder: Polyphaga
- Infraorder: Cucujiformia
- Family: Curculionidae
- Subfamily: Molytinae
- Genus: Poropterus; Schoenherr, C.J., 1844

= Poropterus =

Genus of beetles

Poropterus is a genus of beetle belonging to the family Curculionidae.

== List of species ==
- Poropterus abstersus Boheman, 1844
- Poropterus afflictus Pascoe, 1888
- Poropterus alboscutellatus Lea, 1911
- Poropterus angustatus Lea, 1897
- Poropterus angustus Lea, 1928
- Poropterus antiquus Boheman, 1844
- Poropterus approximatus Pascoe, 1871
- Poropterus archaicus Pascoe, 1885
- Poropterus astheniatus Lea, 1897
- Poropterus basalis Lea, 1928
- Poropterus basiliscus Pascoe, 1888
- Poropterus basipennis Lea, 1913
- Poropterus bengueticus Heller, 1912
- Poropterus bisignatus Pascoe, 1872
- Poropterus bituberculatus Lea, 1897
- Poropterus bituberosus Faust, 1898
- Poropterus bivittatus Faust, 1898
- Poropterus carinicollis Lea, 1909
- Poropterus cavernosus Lea, 1905
- Poropterus cavirostris Lea, 1897
- Poropterus chevrolati Waterhouse, 1853
- Poropterus communis Lea, 1897
- Poropterus concretus Pascoe, 1885
- Poropterus conifer Boheman, 1844
- Poropterus constrictifrons Lea, 1913
- Poropterus convexus Lea, 1913
- Poropterus corvus Lea, 1897
- Poropterus crassicornis Lea, 1897
- Poropterus crassipes Lea, 1913
- Poropterus cribratus Lea, 1928
- Poropterus cryptodermus Lea, 1928
- Poropterus cucullatus Heller, ?
- Poropterus decapitatus Heller, ?
- Poropterus difficilis Lea, 1897
- Poropterus echymis Pascoe, 1885
- Poropterus ellipticus Pascoe, 1871
- Poropterus excitiosus Pascoe, 1871
- Poropterus fasciculatus Lea, 1897
- Poropterus ferox Faust, 1898
- Poropterus ferrugineus Lea, 1928
- Poropterus flexuosus Pascoe, 1871
- Poropterus foveatus Lea, 1905
- Poropterus foveipennis Pascoe, 1871
- Poropterus gemmifer Pascoe, 1885
- Poropterus glanis Pascoe, 1885
- Poropterus griseus Lea, 1928
- Poropterus hariolus Pascoe, 1871
- Poropterus harpagus Lea, 1897
- Poropterus humeralis Lea, 1909
- Poropterus idolus Lea, 1897
- Poropterus impendens Lea, 1928
- Poropterus innominatus Pascoe, 1873
- Poropterus intermedius Lea, 1897
- Poropterus inusitatus Lea, 1905
- Poropterus irritus Pascoe, 1888
- Poropterus jekeli Waterhouse, 1853
- Poropterus latipennis Lea, 1913
- Poropterus lemur Pascoe, 1881
- Poropterus lissorhinus Lea, 1905
- Poropterus listroderus Lea, 1905
- Poropterus longipes Lea, 1905
- Poropterus lutulentus Lea, 1897
- Poropterus magnus Lea, 1913
- Poropterus mastoideus Pascoe, 1871
- Poropterus melancholicus Lea, 1911
- Poropterus mitratus Pascoe, 1885
- Poropterus mollis Lea, 1913
- Poropterus montanus Lea, 1909
- Poropterus morbillosus Pascoe, 1871
- Poropterus multicolor Lea, 1913
- Poropterus musculus Pascoe, 1872
- Poropterus nodosus Lea, 1905
- Poropterus obesus Lea, 1928
- Poropterus odiosus Boheman, 1845
- Poropterus oniscus Pascoe, 1873
- Poropterus ordinarius Pascoe, 1885
- Poropterus ornaticollis Lea, 1913
- Poropterus orthodoxus Lea, 1897
- Poropterus papillosus Heller, ?
- Poropterus parallelus Lea, 1897
- Poropterus parryi Waterhouse, 1853
- Poropterus parvidens Lea, 1913
- Poropterus pertinax Pascoe, 1885
- Poropterus pervicax Faust, 1898
- Poropterus pictus Lea, 1928
- Poropterus platyderes Lea, 1913
- Poropterus porrigineus Pascoe, 1872
- Poropterus posterius Lea, 1928
- Poropterus posticalis Lea, 1913
- Poropterus prodigiosus Heller, 1935
- Poropterus prodigus Pascoe, 1873
- Poropterus punctipennis Lea, 1928
- Poropterus python Pascoe, 1881
- Poropterus rhyticephalus Lea, 1905
- Poropterus rubeter Lea, 1913
- Poropterus rubus Lea, 1897
- Poropterus satyrus Pascoe, 1873
- Poropterus sciureus Pascoe, 1885
- Poropterus setipes Lea, 1928
- Poropterus sharpi Faust, 1898
- Poropterus simsoni Lea, 1913
- Poropterus socius Pascoe, 1885
- Poropterus solidus Faust, 1898
- Poropterus sphacelatus Pascoe, 1871
- Poropterus stenogaster Lea, 1913
- Poropterus submaculatus Lea, 1928
- Poropterus succisus Hustache, 1936
- Poropterus succosus Boheman, 1844
- Poropterus sulciventris Lea, 1909
- Poropterus sylvicola Lea, 1928
- Poropterus tetricus Pascoe, 1874
- Poropterus trifoveiventris Lea, 1913
- Poropterus tumulosus Pascoe, 1873
- Poropterus undulatus Lea, 1911
- Poropterus variabilis Lea, 1897
- Poropterus varicosus Pascoe, 1873
- Poropterus verres Pascoe, 1871
- Poropterus vicarius Pascoe, 1885
- Poropterus waterhousei Pascoe, 1871
- Poropterus westwoodi Waterhouse, 1853
