= Alphonse Hustache =

French entomologist

- Born: 14 April 1872; Vic-le-Fesq, France
- Died: 2 March 1949 (aged 76); Saint-Genis-Laval, France

Academic work
- Discipline: entomology
- Main interests: Curculionidae
- Notable works: Curculionidae Gallo-Rhénans

Alphonse Hustache (14 April 1872 – 2 March 1949) was a French entomologist.

He was one of the best known specialists on Curculionidae.

== Works ==
He wrote many articles in many journals such as l'Échange, Bulletin de la Société entomologique de France, Miscellanea Entomologica, and many others including north African and South American ones.

== Books ==
- 1932 - Curculionidae Gallo-Rhénans, 1189 pages, published in 8 parts in the Annales de la société entomologique de France from 1923 to 1932
- 1924 - Synopsis des Curculionides de Madagascar, 524 pages
- 1925 - Tableaux analytiques des Coléoptères de la Faune Franco-Rhénane. Curculionidae Ceuthorrhynchini - 314 pages, as a supplement of Miscellanea Entomologica from 1920 to 1925.
- 1931 - Tableaux analytiques des Coléoptères de la Faune Franco-Rhénane. Curculionidae Apioninae, 286 pages, as a supplement of Miscellanea Entomologica.
- 1934, 1936 & 1938 - He wrote parts 136, 151 and 163 of the Coleopterorum Catalogus, the Sigmund Schenkling's work of his life.
