= Dimorphothynnus bicolor =

Scientific classification
- Kingdom: Animalia
- Phylum: Arthropoda
- Class: Insecta
- Order: Hymenoptera
- Family: Tiphiidae
- Genus: Dimorphothynnus
- Species: D. bicolor

Binomial name
- Dimorphothynnus bicolor (Westwood, 1844)

Species of insect

Dimorphothynnus bicolor is an insect in the Tiphiidae family.

It was first described by John Obadiah Westwood in 1844, as Enteles bicolor.

For a discussion of some of the problems associated with the taxonomy of this species, see B.B. Given's Notes on Australian Thynninae. II. The genera Dimorphothynnus, Rhagigaster and Eirone.

== Description ==
Westwood describes it as follows:

The head is black and punctured; the mandibles red, and not bearded beneath: they are entire along the inner margin. The antennae are short and black; the thorax is strongly punctured above, as is also the abdomen, which is entirely black, except the terminal deflexed segment, which is pitchy-red at its extremity. All the segments have a carinated stria across, near the hinder margin, and the second segment is also marked with five or six similar striae across its disc. The apical segment is obtusely truncate, deflexed, and longitudinally striated, emitting the aculeus from its lower extremity. The legs are red, robust, and apparently formed for burrowing.

== Distribution ==
Westwood states that it lives in King George's Sound.
