= Gregório Bondar =

Brazilian entomologist (1881–1959)

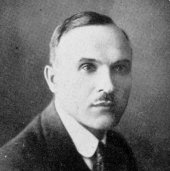
- Born: Gregório Gregorievitch Bondar; November 18, 1881; Mala Burimka, Zolotonoshsky Uyezd, Poltava Governorate, Russian Empire (now part of Zolotonosha Raion, Cherkasy Oblast, Ukraine)
- Died: February 20, 1959 (aged 77); Salvador, Bahia, Brazil
- Citizenship: Russian, Brazilian
- Education: Nancy-Université
- Scientific career
- Fields: Biology, Agronomy, Entomology, Botany
- Workplaces: Escola Superior de Agricultura Luiz de Queiroz; Department of Agriculture of State of Bahia; Instituto de Cacau da Bahia; Instituto Central de Fomento Econômico da Bahia

Gregório Gregorievitch Bondar (1881–1959) was a Ukrainian-Brazilian agronomist and entomologist. In honor of his contributions, an agricultural research station at Belmonte, Bahia, was named after him.

== Biography ==
=== Early life ===
Bondar was born to a family of farmers who owned 5 hectares of land in the village of Malaia Buromca, district of Zolotonosha. There he attended elementary school, graduating in 1892. In 1894, his family emigrated to the department of Yeniseysk, in Siberia. There he has worked for a year as a farmer, being later appointed as a clerk for the municipality. In 1896, he moved to Kansk, where he worked as a clerk at the police department. In 1899, he quit his job and went back to school in Krasnoyarsk, graduating in 1902. Between 1902 and 1905, he worked as Elementary School teacher in Yeniseysk.

=== Imprisonment and first migration to Brazil ===
In 1905, Bondar was drafted by the military to fight in the Russo-Japanese War. In the same year, he was arrested for subversive political activities. He gained amnesty with the October Manifesto in the same year, joining an armed uprising in Krasnoyarsk a month later. He was again arrested, escaping on May 20, 1906. He migrated to Manchuria under the identity of Gregório Kogutovsky, where he worked as a teacher in Hailar District until 1908. In that year, he moved to France to attend the University of Nancy, where he graduated as agronomist in 1910. Unable to go back to Russia, he moved to Brazil. He initially worked as a free-lance photographer, being hired in 1911 as research assistant in the plant pathology department of the Campinas Agronomical Institute. In 1913, he received Brazilian citizenship and was appointed professor of agricultural zoology and entomology at the Luiz de Queiroz College of Agriculture.

=== Return to Russia ===
In early 1916, Bondar returned to Russia to fight in the World War I. Before graduating from military school, he was arrested for the 1905 charges and sent to jail in Krasnoyarsk. He received amnesty in 1917, following the Russian Revolution. Being politically moderate, he joined the White movement and was eventually appointed as vice-governor of the department of Yeniseysk. With the defeat of the Provisional All-Russian Government, he was arrested and sentenced to death on December 24, 1919. His sentence was never executed and, in 1920, he was freed on the condition of organizing agricultural defense against a locust outbreak attacking wheat in the southern part of the department of Yeniseysk. On the way to his destination, he managed to escape, initially to Mongolia.

=== Settlement in Brazil ===
From Mongolia, Bondar traveled to Manchuria, Korea and Japan. In September 1920, he boarded the ship Chicago Maru towards Santos, in Brazil. In 1921, Bondar was hired by the state of Bahia as an entomologist and plant pathologist in the Department of Agriculture. After settling 1921, he lived in Bahia until the end of his life. In 1932, he was transferred to the Instituto de Cacau da Bahia. In 1938, he was hired as a technical consultant by the Instituto Central de Fomento Econômico da Bahia.

== Research ==
Bondar has described several new species of palms (Arecaceae). He also published several articles of economic botany of plants in the families Apocynaceae, Euphorbiaceae, Araceae and Arecaceae. His book "Palmeiras do Brasil" was published posthumously, in 1964, by the Institute of Botany of São Paulo.

He has described 318 species of insects, including many pests of the plants he studied. The Bondar collection was acquired by David Rockefeller and donated to the American Museum of Natural History, including his type specimens. Most of his entomological research was published in a series of papers named Notas Entomológicas da Baía, published between 1937 and 1950 the journal Revista de Entomologia.
