= Vanina, Kursk Oblast =

Rural locality in Kursk Oblast, Russia

Vanina Ванина
- Village
- Interactive map of Vanina
- Location of Vanina Vanina (Kursk Oblast)
- Coordinates: 51°41′03″N 35°54′44″E
- Country: Russia
- Federal subject: Kursk Oblast
- Administrative district: Oktyabrsky District
- SelsovietSelsoviet: Dolzhenkovsky
- Elevation: 160 m (520 ft)

Population (2010 Census)
  - Total: 419
  - Estimate (2010): 419 (0%)

Municipal status
  - Municipal district: Oktyabrsky Municipal District
  - Rural settlement: Dolzhenkovsky Selsoviet Rural Settlement
- Time zone: UTC+3 (MSK)
- Postal code: 307200
- Dialing code: +7 47142
- OKTMO ID: 38628408111
- Website: bolshedol.rkursk.ru

Vanina (Russian: Ванина) is a rural locality (Russian: деревня, lit. 'village') in Dolzhenkovsky Selsoviet Rural Settlement, Oktyabrsky District, Kursk Oblast, Russia. Population: 419 (2010 census); 537 (2002 census);

== Geography ==
The village is located on the Bolshaya Kuritsa River (a right tributary of the Seym River), 74 km from the Russia–Ukraine border, 15 km south-west of Kursk, 2.5 km north-west of the district center – the urban-type settlement Pryamitsyno, 5 km from the selsoviet center – Bolshoye Dolzhenkovo.

Streets

There are the following streets in the locality: Komaryovka, Novaya, Sadovaya, Staraya and Studenaya (245 houses).

Climate

Vanina has a warm-summer humid continental climate (Dfb in the Köppen climate classification).

Climate data for Vanina
Month	Jan	Feb	Mar	Apr	May	Jun	Jul	Aug	Sep	Oct	Nov	Dec	Year
Mean daily maximum °C (°F)	−4.2 (24.4)	−3.2 (26.2)	2.7 (36.9)	13 (55)	19.4 (66.9)	22.7 (72.9)	25.3 (77.5)	24.6 (76.3)	18.2 (64.8)	10.5 (50.9)	3.3 (37.9)	−1.2 (29.8)	10.9 (51.6)
Daily mean °C (°F)	−6.2 (20.8)	−5.7 (21.7)	−0.9 (30.4)	8.2 (46.8)	14.7 (58.5)	18.4 (65.1)	20.9 (69.6)	20 (68)	14 (57)	7.3 (45.1)	1.1 (34.0)	−3.2 (26.2)	7.4 (45.3)
Mean daily minimum °C (°F)	−8.7 (16.3)	−8.8 (16.2)	−5 (23)	2.7 (36.9)	9.1 (48.4)	13 (55)	15.8 (60.4)	14.9 (58.8)	9.7 (49.5)	3.9 (39.0)	−1.2 (29.8)	−5.4 (22.3)	3.3 (38.0)
Average precipitation mm (inches)	51 (2.0)	45 (1.8)	47 (1.9)	50 (2.0)	62 (2.4)	71 (2.8)	73 (2.9)	55 (2.2)	59 (2.3)	59 (2.3)	47 (1.9)	49 (1.9)	668 (26.4)
Source: https://en.climate-data.org/asia/russian-federation/kursk-oblast/ванина-682209/

== Transport ==
Vanina is located 10 km from the federal route M-2 Crimea Highway (a part of the European route E105), 3 km from the road of regional importance 38K-017 (Kursk – Lgov – Rylsk – border with Ukraine), on the road of intermunicipal significance 38H-073 (Dyakonovo – Starkovo – Sokolovka), on the road 38H-075 (38N-073 – Vanina), 5 km from the nearest railway station Dyakonovo (railway line Lgov I — Kursk).

The rural locality is situated 27 km from Kursk Vostochny Airport, 123 km from Belgorod International Airport and 230 km from Voronezh Peter the Great Airport.
