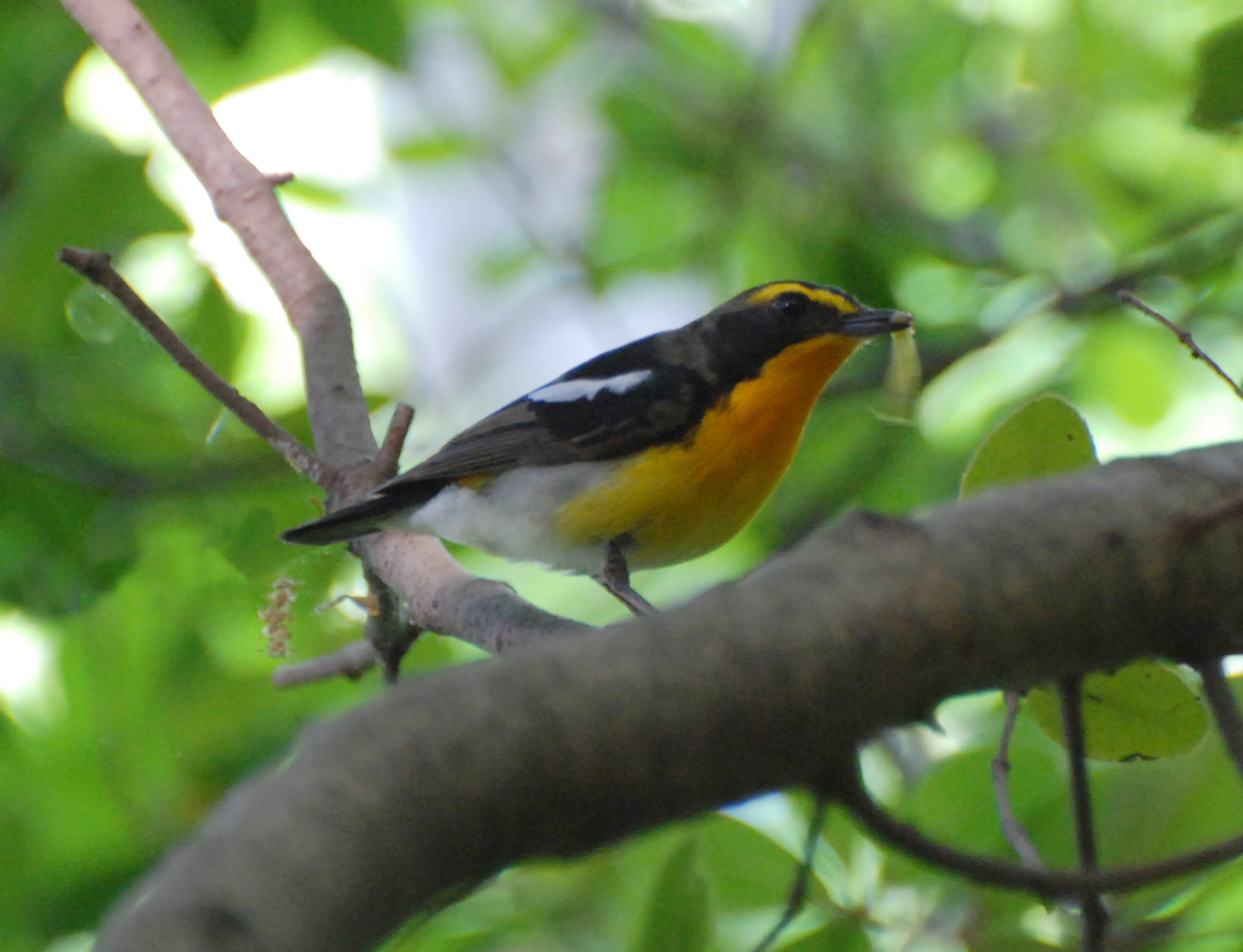
- Male in Osaka, Japan
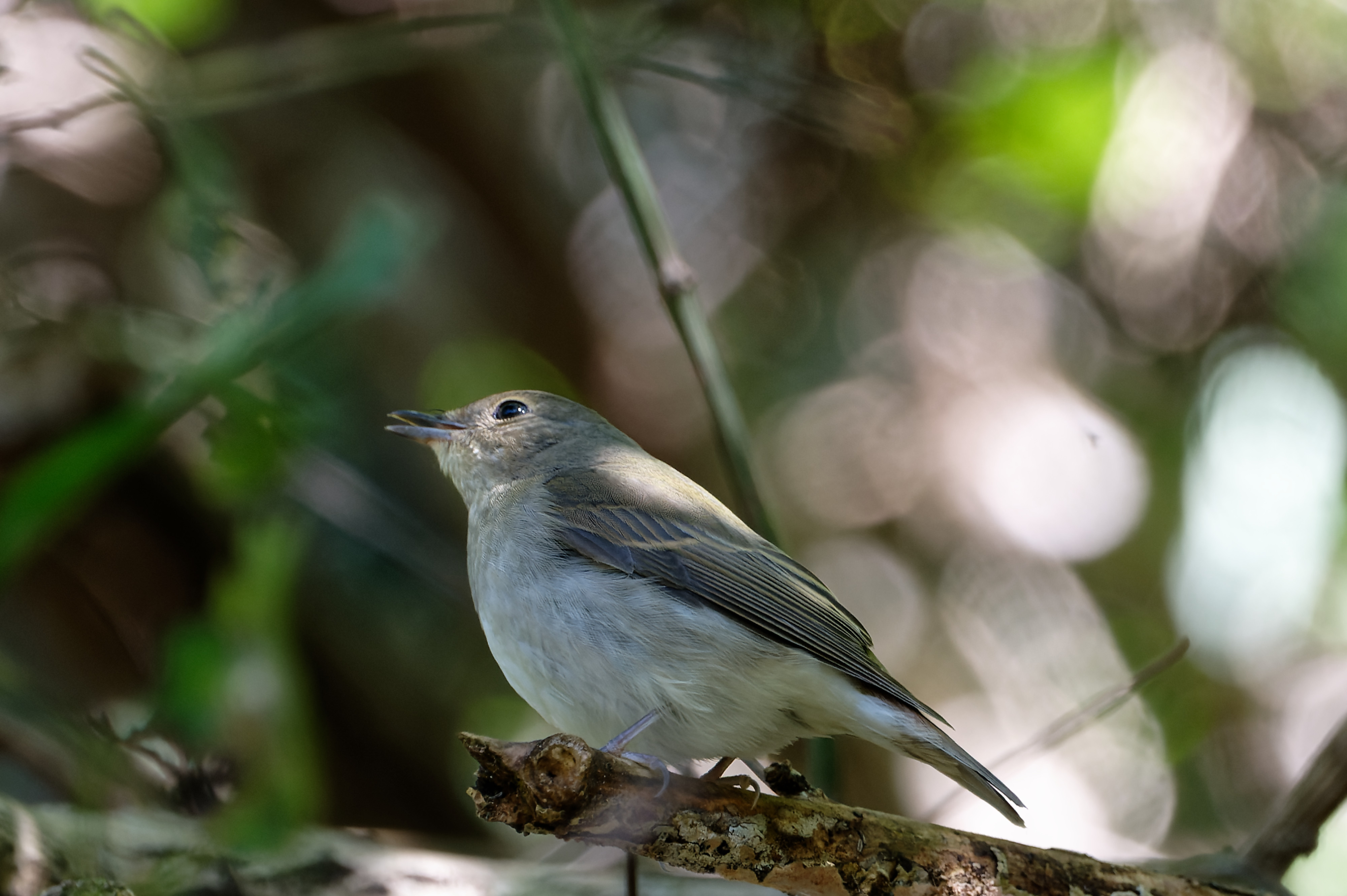
- Female

Conservation status
- Least Concern (IUCN 3.1)

Scientific classification
- Kingdom: Animalia
- Phylum: Chordata
- Class: Aves
- Order: Passeriformes
- Family: Muscicapidae
- Genus: Ficedula
- Species: F. narcissina

Binomial name
- Ficedula narcissina (Temminck, 1836)
- Breeding ranges of species within the complex. The wintering zone indicated is for F. zanthopygia alone.

= Narcissus flycatcher =

Species of bird

The narcissus flycatcher (Ficedula narcissina) is a passerine bird in the Old World flycatcher family. It is native to the East Palearctic, from Sakhalin to the north, through Japan across through Korea, mainland China, and Taiwan, wintering in southeast Asia, including the Philippines, Vietnam and Borneo. It is highly migratory, and has been found as a vagrant from Australia in the south to Alaska in the north.

Narcissus flycatcher males are very distinctive in full breeding plumage, having a black crown and mantle, a bright orange throat with paler chest and underparts, an orange-yellow eyebrow, black wings with a white wing patch, an orange-yellow rump, and a black tail. Non-breeding males have varying levels of yellow. Females are completely dissimilar, with generally buff-brown coloration, with rusty-colored wings, and a two-toned eyering.

This species primarily feeds on insects, and lives in deciduous woodlands. Breeding males sing in repeated melodious whistles. The green-backed flycatcher (F. elisae) of northern China and the Ryukyu flycatcher (F. owstoni) of the Ryukyu Islands were formerly considered subspecies.

There are several subspecies, largely determined by plumage and range variations, at least two of which have been split off as separate species. F. n. narcissina, the nominate race, found from Sakhalin south to the Philippines.

The narcissus flycatcher arrives in Southeast Asia during early May to commence mating behavior. Males arrive before females to prepare a nest that will aid in the selection of a mate as well as shelter. Due to familiarity with the ritual older males typically arrive at the area sooner than younger males.

The name of the bird is a reference to the yellow color of many varieties of the narcissus flower.
