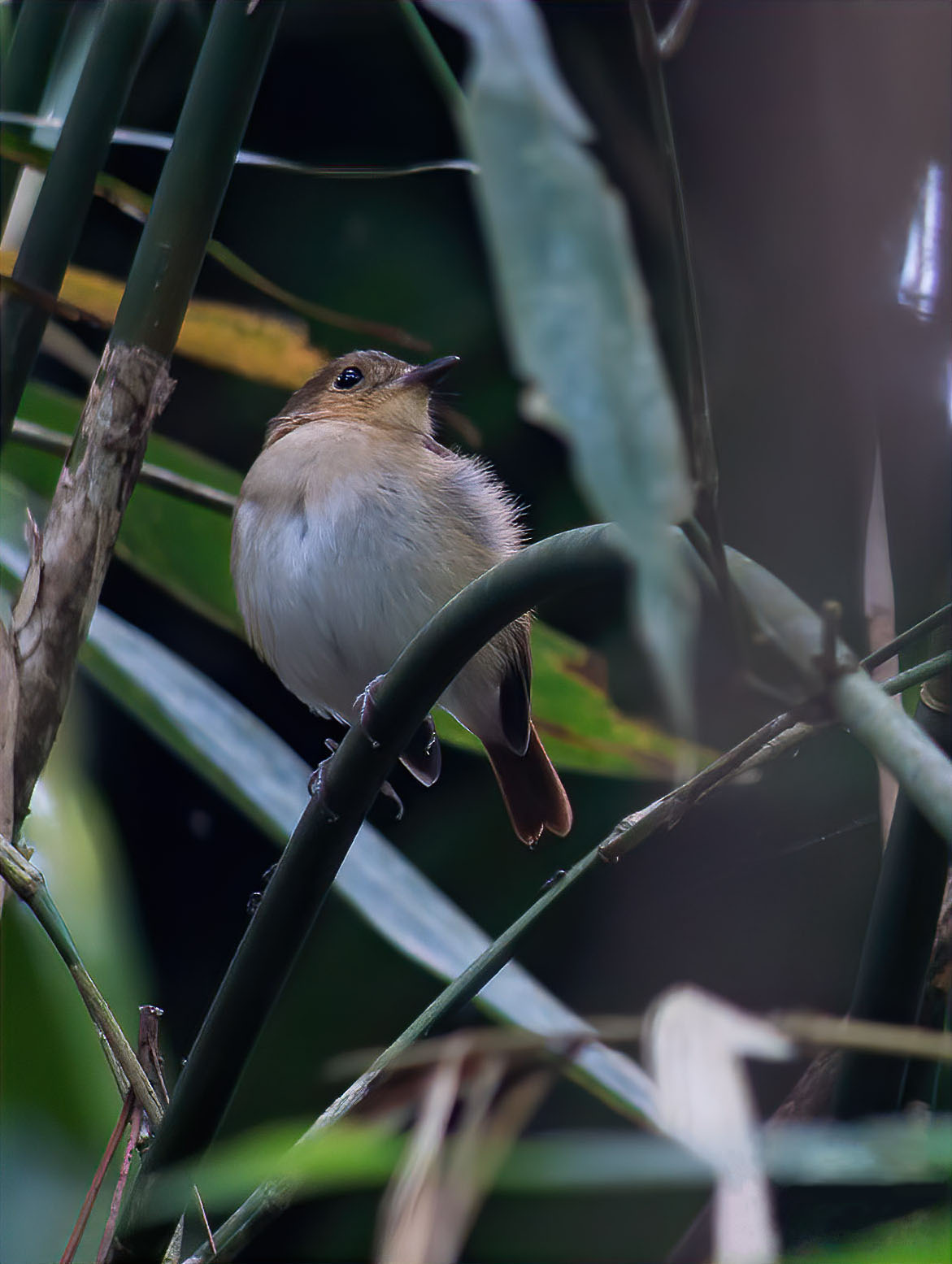

Conservation status
- Least Concern (IUCN 3.1)

Scientific classification
- Kingdom: Animalia
- Phylum: Chordata
- Class: Aves
- Order: Passeriformes
- Family: Muscicapidae
- Genus: Ficedula
- Species: F. crypta

Binomial name
- Ficedula crypta (Vaurie, 1951)

= Cryptic flycatcher =

Species of bird

The cryptic flycatcher (Ficedula crypta) is a species of bird in the family Muscicapidae. It is endemic to the Philippines only being found in the island of Mindanao. Its natural habitat is tropical moist mid-montane forests from 600 - 1,500 meters.

== Description ==
Its drab colour, low foraging areas and its habit of being perched motionless most likely makes this bird overlooked and unnoticed.

== Habitat and conservation status ==
Found in both primary and secondary forest. It is a mid-montane species with its altitude range of where it is seen is 600 - 1,500 meters above sea level. It is known to forage low in the tree line, often perching on the ground.

IUCN has assessed this bird as a least-concern species . While it has a limited range, is supposedly common in areas it is found.however the population is said to be decreasing. This is due to habitat loss due to legal and illegal logging, mining and conversion into farmlands through Slash-and-burn or other methods.
