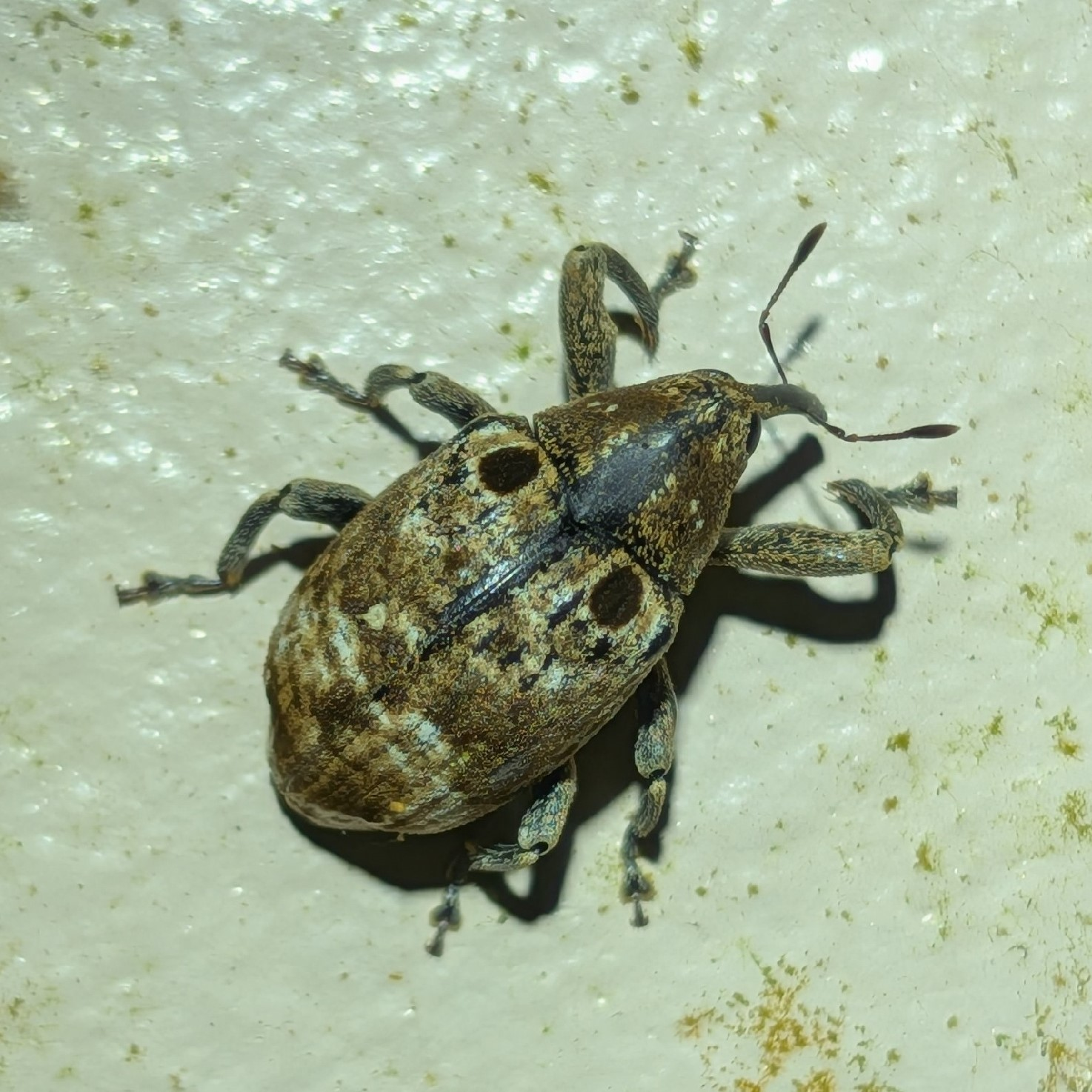

Scientific classification
- Kingdom: Animalia
- Phylum: Arthropoda
- Clade: Pancrustacea
- Class: Insecta
- Order: Coleoptera
- Suborder: Polyphaga
- Infraorder: Cucujiformia
- Superfamily: Curculionoidea
- Family: Curculionidae
- Genus: Perissops
- Species: P. ocellatus

Binomial name
- Perissops ocellatus (Redtenbacher, 1868)

Synonyms
- Enteles ocellatus Redtenbacher, 1868

= Perissops ocellatus =

Species of insect

Perissops ocellatus is a species of weevil in the family Curculionidae. It is found on the eastern coast of Australia in New South Wales and Queensland.

It was first described by Ludwig Redtenbacher in 1868 as Enteles ocellatus. In 1871, it was assigned by Francis Polkinghorne Pascoe to the genus Perissops, giving the present combination of Perissops ocellatus.
