= Patricia Vaurie =

American entomologist

- Born: September 14, 1909; Swarthmore, Pennsylvania
- Died: March 12, 1982 (aged 72)
- Education: Barnard College
- Scientific career
- Fields: Entomology
- Workplaces: American Museum of Natural History
- Author abbrev. (zoology): Vaurie

Patricia Vaurie (née Wilson; September 14, 1909 – March 12, 1982) was an American entomologist who specialized in beetles in the families Scarabaeidae and Curculionidae. She worked in the American Museum of Natural History for much of her working life.

== Biography ==
Patricia Wilson was born in Swarthmore, Pennsylvania in 1909 and grew up in New York. She graduated from Barnard College in 1931 with a degree in English literature. In 1934, she married Charles Vaurie, a dentist and amateaur ornithologist. During World War II, Wilson began volunteering in the Department of Insects and Spiders, later known as the Department of Entomology, at the American Museum of Natural History. Although she started as a volunteer, she began publishing her own scientific studies in 1948 and was appointed as a research associate in 1957. She held this role and published work until her death in 1982. Her husband also joined the museum as a volunteer, ultimately being promoted to Curator Emeritus in the Department of Ornithology. Together, they often traveled around the world to conduct research and collect coleopterous specimens for the museum. Vaurie's speciality was in beetles, particularly focusing on weevils and tiger beetles. Despite the lack of a formal scientific degree, Vaurie was highly respected in the ornithology field for her extensive written contributions, which totaled 77 publications and included several revisions of a wide range of insect groups. She was also a member and benefactor of the Coleopterists Society, and was made an Honorary Member after her death in 1982 in recognition of her scientific work and financial contributions

== Eponyms ==
At least one species has been named in her honour:

- Metamasius vaurieae Anderson, 2002

== Works ==
Some of her major works include: (Note: For a full bibliography see Herman (1982).)

- 1948 A revision of the North American Languriidae. Bull. Amer. Mus. Nat. Hist. 92:123-155.
- 1950 The blister beetle of north central Mexico (Coleoptera, Meloidae). Amer. Mus. Novitates, no. 1477, pp. 1–68, figs. 1-21.
- 1954 Revision of the genera Anchylorhynchus and Petalochilus of the Petalochilinae (Coleoptera, Curculionidae). Amer. Mus. Novitates, no. 1651, pp. 1–58, figs. 1–4.
- 1954 New synonymy in Diplotaxis (Coleoptera, Scarabaeidae). Bull. Brooklyn Ent. Soc., vol. 49, no. 2, pp. 49–54.
- 1955 Revision of the genus Trox in North America (Coleoptera, Scarabaeidae). Bull. Amer. Mus. Nat. Hist., vol. 106, pp. 1–89, figs. 1-27.
- 1955 Review of the North American genus Amblycheila (Coleoptera, Cicindelidae). Amer. Mus. Novitates, no. 1724, pp. 1–26, figs. 1–11.
- 1955 Review of the genus Macrosiagon in Mexico, with notes on Ripiphorus (Coleoptera, Rhipiphoridae). Amer. Mus. Novitates, no. 1717, pp. 1–19, fig. 1.
- 1955 (with Mont A. Cazier). Thirteen new species of Diplotaxis from northern Mexico (Coleoptera, Scarabaeidae). Amer. Mus. Novitates, no. 1739, pp. 1–25, figs. 1–3.
- 1963 Key to Diplotaxis of Baja California (Coleoptera: Scarabaeidae). Pan-Pacific Ent. 39:67-73, figs. 1–19.
- 1980 Revision of Rhodobaenus. Part 1. Species in South America (Coleoptera, Curculionidae, Rhynchophorinae). Bull. Amer. Mus. Nat. Hist., vol. 167, pp. 1–44.
- 1981 Revision of Rhodobaenus. Part 2. Species in North America (Canada to Panama) (Coleoptera, Curculionidae, Rhynchophorinae). Bull. Amer. Mus. Nat. Hist., vol. 171, pp. 117–198, figs. 1-65, 1 table.
