= Charles Vaurie =

French-born American ornithologist

Charles Vaurie (7 July 1906 – 13 May 1975) was a French-born American ornithologist. He was born in Beaulieu sur Dordogne, France but moved to Trenton, New Jersey as a youth. He studied at New York University and then qualified as a dentist at the University of Pennsylvania in 1928.

An interest in painting birds developed, and after marrying his entomologist wife, Patricia Wilson, in 1934, the two shared numerous field trips. Vaurie became associated with the American Museum of Natural History and by 1946 he was a Research Associate. He went on to produce more than 150 ornithological publications. His most important work was a systematic review of Palearctic birds. By 1956, he was a full-time ornithologist at AMNH, and rose to Curator by 1967. At the time of his death he was a member of the Standing Committee on Ornithological Nomenclature of the International Ornithological Congress.

He described for the first time the cryptic flycatcher (Ficedula crypta), Vilcabamba thistletail (Schizoeaca vilcabambae), and Vaurie's nightjar (Caprimulgus centralasicus). As of 2020, Vaurie's nightjar is no longer considered to be a valid species.

== Partial bibliography ==
- A Revision of the bird family Dicruridae. N.Y., 1949.
- "Systematic notes on Palearctic birds". N.Y. 1956 (American Museum of Natural History, American Museum Novitates)
- A generic revision of Fly-catchers of the tribe Muscicapini. N.Y., 1953.
- "Notes on some Ploceidae from Western Asia"; "Notes on some Asiatic Finches"; "Notes on the bird genus Oenanthe in Persia, Afghanistan, and India;" and several other articles all published in the American Museum Novitates. N.Y., 1949–1952.
- "A generic revision of Flycatchers of the tribe Muscicapini". N.Y., 1953. pp.27 figs & 7 tables. Wrapp. Bulletin American Museum of Natural History – Vol. 100: Art. 4.
- The Birds of the Palearctic Fauna: a Systematic Reference (2 Vols. )1959
- Classification of the Ovenbirds (Furnariidae). London, 1971.
- Tibet and its birds. 1972
