= Sergio Antonio Vanin =

Brazilian entomologist (1948–2020)

Sergio Vanin
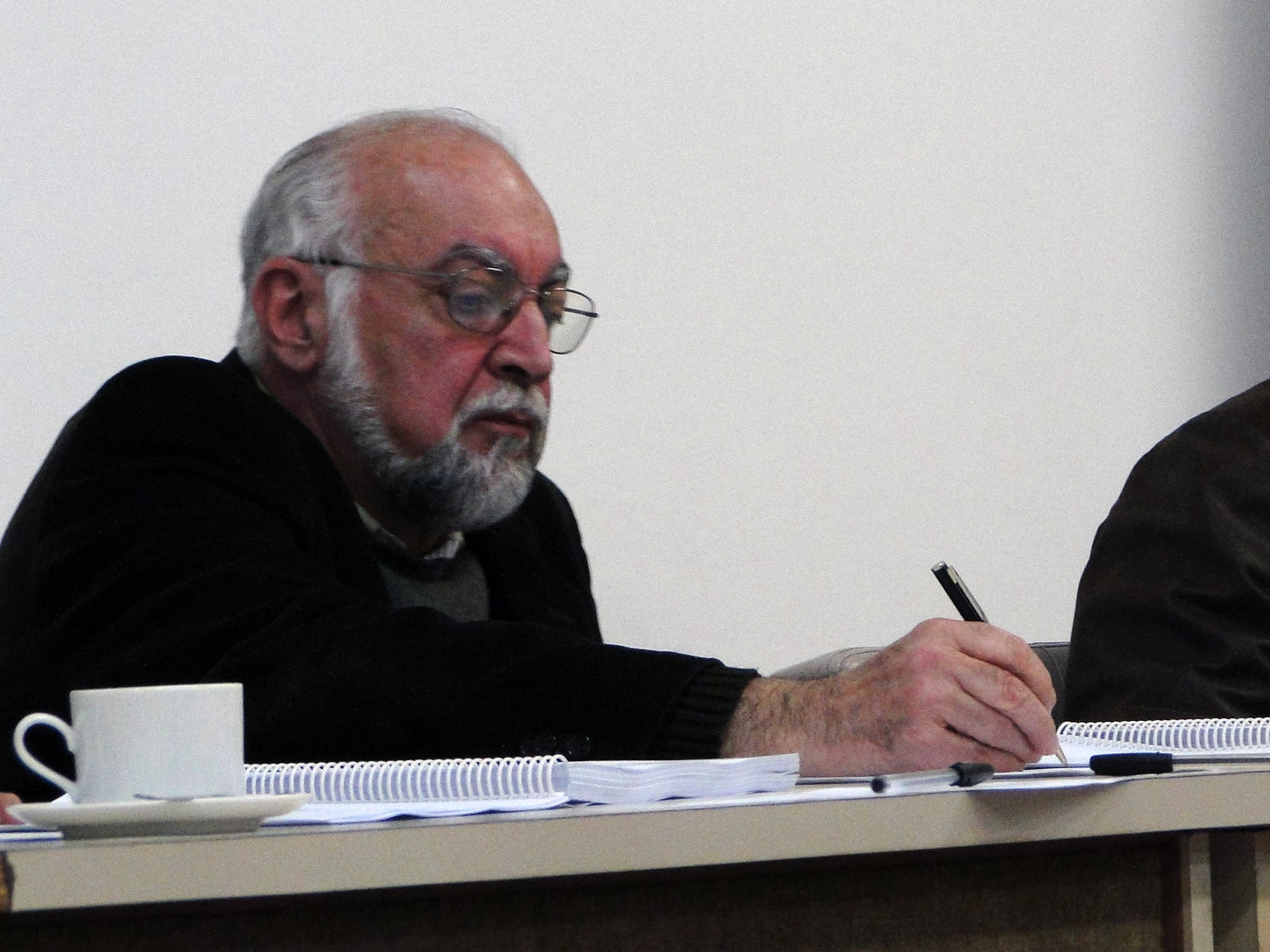
- Born: Sergio Antonio Vanin; October 26, 1948; São Paulo, São Paulo, Brazil
- Died: October 21, 2020 (aged 71); São Paulo, São Paulo, Brazil
- Education: University of São Paulo
- Scientific career
- Fields: Biology, Entomology, Systematics
- Workplaces: University of São Paulo
- Academic advisors: Hans Reichardt; Cleide Costa

Sergio Antonio Vanin (26 October 1948 – 21 October 2020) was an entomologist at the University of São Paulo. As student and professor, he served more than 50 years in that institution, being recognized as Professor Emeritus in 2018. During his career, he produced 108 publications and advised 16 graduate students, having a large influence in the adoption of phylogenetic systematics in Brazil.

Vanin described a total of 123 new species of beetles, most of them in the families Curculionidae, Torrindicolidae, Cerophytidae and Belidae. Another 23 species have been named in honor to him. In addition to the new species, a large contribution was the morphological description of immature stages of 179 species of beetles, many of them summarized in the book "Larvas de Coleoptera do Brasil".
