= Johannes Faust =

German entomologist (1832–1903)

Johannes K.E. Faust
- Born: February 12, 1832; Stettin
- Died: January 18, 1903 (aged 70); Pirna
- Known for: Study of Coleoptera, especially Curculionidae
- Scientific career
- Fields: Entomology

Johannes K.E. Faust (12 February 1832, Stettin – 18 January 1903, Pirna) was a German entomologist.

Faust specialised in Coleoptera, especially Curculionidae. Faust's beetle collection, including many types is now conserved mostly in the Museum für Tierkunde in Dresden, Germany (SMTD) and the Museum National d'Histoire Naturelle in Paris, France (MNHN).

He was a Member of the Entomological Society of Stettin.

== Works ==
Partial list

- 1877. Beiträge zur Kenntniss der Käfer des Europäischen und Asiatischen Russlands mit Einschluss der Küsten des Kaspischen Meers. Horae Societatis Entomologicae Rossicae varii sermonibus in Rossia usitatis editae 12: 300-330.
- 1882 Rüsselkäfer aus dem Amurgebiet Deutsche Entomol. Zeitschr. 26 (2), 17–295
- 1893 Neue Ost-Sibirische Curculioniden Deutsche Entomol. Zeitschr. 2, 201–205
- 1894 Viaggio di Leonardo Fea in Birmania e regioni vicine. LX. Curculionidae. Annali del’Museo Civico di storia Naturale di Genova. 34: 153-370
- Reise von E. Simon in Venezuela. Curculionidae. Pars secunda. Stett. Entomol. Ztg., 1893 (1894), 54:313-367.
- 1899. Viaggo di Lamberto Loria nella Papuasia orientale. XXIII. Curculionidae. Annali del Museo Civico di Storia Naturale di Genova 40: 1–130.
