= List of birds of South Korea =

This is a list of the bird species recorded in South Korea. The avifauna of South Korea include a total of 593 species, of which 3 have been introduced by humans. One species listed is extirpated in South Korea. 42 species are globally threatened.

This list's taxonomic treatment (designation and sequence of orders, families and species) and nomenclature (common and scientific names) follow the conventions of The Clements Checklist of Birds of the World, 2022 edition. The family accounts at the beginning of each heading reflect this taxonomy, as do the species counts found in each family account. Introduced and accidental species are included in the total counts for South Korea.

The following tags have been used to highlight several categories. The commonly occurring native species do not fall into any of these categories.

- (A) Accidental - a species that rarely or accidentally occurs in South Korea
- (I) Introduced - a species introduced to South Korea as a consequence, direct or indirect, of human actions
- (Ex) Extirpated - a species that no longer occurs in South Korea although populations exist elsewhere

== Ducks, geese, and waterfowl ==
Order: Anseriformes Family: Anatidae

Anatidae includes the ducks and most duck-like waterfowl, such as geese and swans. These birds are adapted to an aquatic existence with webbed feet, flattened bills, and feathers that are excellent at shedding water due to an oily coating.

- Bar-headed goose, Anser indicus (A)
- Emperor goose, Anser canagica (A)
- Snow goose, Anser caerulescens (A)
- Graylag goose, Anser anser (A)
- Swan goose, Anser cygnoides
- Greater white-fronted goose, Anser albifrons
- Lesser white-fronted goose, Anser erythropus (A)
- Taiga bean-goose, Anser fabalis
- Tundra bean-goose, Anser serrirostris
- Brant, Branta bernicla (A)
- Barnacle goose, Branta leucopsis (A)
- Cackling goose, Branta hutchinsii (A)
- Red-breasted goose, Branta ruficollis (A)
- Mute swan, Cygnus olor (A)
- Tundra swan, Cygnus columbianus
- Whooper swan, Cygnus cygnus
- Ruddy shelduck, Tadorna ferruginea
- Common shelduck, Tadorna tadorna
- Crested shelduck, Tadorna cristata (A)
- Cotton pygmy-goose, Nettapus coromandelianus (A)
- Mandarin duck, Aix galericulata
- Baikal teal, Sibirionetta formosa
- Garganey, Spatula querquedula
- Northern shoveler, Spatula clypeata
- Gadwall, Mareca strepera
- Falcated duck, Mareca falcata
- Eurasian wigeon, Mareca penelope
- American wigeon, Mareca americana (A)
- Eastern spot-billed duck, Anas zonorhyncha
- Mallard, Anas platyrhynchos
- Northern pintail, Anas acuta
- Green-winged teal, Anas crecca
- Red-crested pochard, Netta rufina (A)
- Canvasback, Aythya valisineria (A)
- Redhead, Aythya americana (A)
- Common pochard, Aythya ferina
- Ring-necked duck, Aythya collaris (A)
- Ferruginous duck, Aythya nyroca (A)
- Baer's pochard, Aythya baeri (A)
- Tufted duck, Aythya fuligula
- Greater scaup, Aythya marila
- Lesser scaup, Aythya affinis (A)
- King eider, Somateria spectabilis (A)
- Harlequin duck, Histrionicus histrionicus
- Surf scoter, Melanitta perspicillata (A)
- Velvet scoter, Melanitta fusca (A)
- Stejneger's scoter, Melanitta stejnegeri
- Black scoter, Melanitta americana
- Long-tailed duck, Clangula hyemalis (A)
- Bufflehead, Bucephala albeola (A)
- Common goldeneye, Bucephala clangula
- Barrow's goldeneye, Bucephala islandica (A)
- Smew, Mergellus albellus
- Common merganser, Mergus merganser
- Red-breasted merganser, Mergus serrator
- Scaly-sided merganser, Mergus squamatus (A)

== Pheasants, grouse, and allies ==
Order: Galliformes Family: Phasianidae

The Phasianidae are a family of terrestrial birds. In general, they are plump (although they vary in size) and have broad, relatively short wings.

- Hazel grouse, Bonasa bonasia
- Ring-necked pheasant, Phasianus colchicus
- Japanese quail, Coturnix japonica

== Grebes ==
Order: Podicipediformes Family: Podicipedidae

Grebes are small to medium-large freshwater diving birds. They have lobed toes and are excellent swimmers and divers. However, they have their feet placed far back on the body, making them quite ungainly on land.

- Little grebe, Tachybaptus ruficollis
- Horned grebe, Podiceps auritus
- Red-necked grebe, Podiceps grisegena
- Great crested grebe, Podiceps cristatus
- Eared grebe, Podiceps nigricollis

== Pigeons and doves ==
Order: Columbiformes Family: Columbidae

Pigeons and doves are stout-bodied birds with short necks and short slender bills with a fleshy cere.

- Rock pigeon, Columba livia (I)
- Hill pigeon, Columba rupestris (A)
- Stock dove, Columba oenas (A)
- Japanese wood-pigeon, Columba janthina
- Oriental turtle-dove, Streptopelia orientalis
- Eurasian collared-dove, Streptopelia decaocto (A)
- Red collared-dove, Streptopelia tranquebarica (A)
- Spotted dove, Streptopelia chinensis (A)
- White-bellied green-pigeon, Treron sieboldii (A)

== Sandgrouse ==
Order: Pterocliformes Family: Pteroclidae

Sandgrouse have small, pigeon like heads and necks, but sturdy compact bodies. They have long pointed wings and sometimes tails and a fast direct flight. Flocks fly to watering holes at dawn and dusk. Their legs are feathered down to the toes.

- Pallas's sandgrouse, Syrrhaptes paradoxus (A)

== Bustards ==
Order: Otidiformes Family: Otididae

Bustards are large terrestrial birds mainly associated with dry open country and steppes in the Old World. They are omnivorous and nest on the ground. They walk steadily on strong legs and big toes, pecking for food as they go. They have long broad wings with "fingered" wingtips and striking patterns in flight. Many have interesting mating displays.

- Great bustard, Otis tarda (A)

== Cuckoos ==
Order: Cuculiformes Family: Cuculidae

The family Cuculidae includes cuckoos, roadrunners and anis. These birds are of variable size with slender bodies, long tails and strong legs. Unlike the cuckoo species of the North America, Old World cuckoos are brood parasites.

- Greater coucal, Centropus sinensis (A)
- Lesser coucal, Centropus bengalensis (A)
- Chestnut-winged cuckoo, Clamator coromandus (A)
- Asian koel, Eudynamys scolopaceus (A)
- Square-tailed drongo-cuckoo, Surniculus lugubris (A)
- Large hawk-cuckoo, Hierococcyx sparverioides (A)
- Northern hawk-cuckoo, Hierococcyx hyperythrus
- Lesser cuckoo, Cuculus poliocephalus
- Indian cuckoo, Cuculus micropterus
- Himalayan cuckoo, Cuculus saturatus (A)
- Common cuckoo, Cuculus canorus
- Oriental cuckoo, Cuculus optatus

== Nightjars and allies ==
Order: Caprimulgiformes Family: Caprimulgidae

Nightjars are medium-sized nocturnal birds that usually nest on the ground. They have long wings, short legs and very short bills. Most have small feet, of little use for walking, and long pointed wings. Their soft plumage is camouflaged to resemble bark or leaves.

- Gray nightjar, Caprimulgus jotaka

== Swifts ==
Order: Caprimulgiformes Family: Apodidae

Swifts are small birds which spend the majority of their lives flying. These birds have very short legs and never settle voluntarily on the ground, perching instead only on vertical surfaces. Many swifts have long swept-back wings which resemble a crescent or boomerang.

- White-throated needletail, Hirundapus caudacutus
- Himalayan swiftlet, Aerodramus brevirostris (A)
- Alpine swift, Apus melba (A)
- Common swift, Apus apus (A)
- Pacific swift, Apus pacificus
- House swift, Apus nipalensis (A)

== Rails, gallinules, and coots ==
Order: Gruiformes Family: Rallidae

Rallidae is a large family of small to medium-sized birds which includes the rails, crakes, coots and gallinules. Typically they inhabit dense vegetation in damp environments near lakes, swamps or rivers. In general they are shy and secretive birds, making them difficult to observe. Most species have strong legs and long toes which are well adapted to soft uneven surfaces. They tend to have short, rounded wings and to be weak fliers.

- Water rail, Rallus aquaticus (A)
- Brown-cheeked rail, Rallus indicus
- Eurasian moorhen, Gallinula chloropus
- Eurasian coot, Fulica atra
- Watercock, Gallicrex cinerea
- White-breasted waterhen, Amaurornis phoenicurus (A)
- Ruddy-breasted crake, Zapornia fusca (A)
- Band-bellied crake, Zapornia paykullii (A)
- Baillon's crake, Zapornia pusilla (A)
- Swinhoe's rail, Coturnicops exquisitus (A)

== Cranes ==
Order: Gruiformes Family: Gruidae

Cranes are large, long-legged and long-necked birds. Unlike the similar-looking but unrelated herons, cranes fly with necks outstretched, not pulled back. Most have elaborate and noisy courting displays or "dances".

- Demoiselle crane, Anthropoides virgo (A)
- Siberian crane, Leucogeranus leucogeranus (A)
- Sandhill crane, Antigone canadensis (A)
- White-naped crane, Antigone vipio
- Common crane, Grus grus (A)
- Hooded crane, Grus monacha
- Red-crowned crane, Grus japonensis

== Stilts and avocets ==
Order: Charadriiformes Family: Recurvirostridae

Recurvirostridae is a family of large wading birds, which includes the avocets and stilts. The avocets have long legs and long up-curved bills. The stilts have extremely long legs and long, thin, straight bills.

- Black-winged stilt, Himantopus himantopus
- Pied avocet, Recurvirostra avosetta (A)

== Oystercatchers ==
Order: Charadriiformes Family: Haematopodidae

The oystercatchers are large and noisy plover-like birds, with strong bills used for smashing or prising open molluscs.

- Eurasian oystercatcher, Haematopus ostralegus

== Plovers and lapwings ==
Order: Charadriiformes Family: Charadriidae

The family Charadriidae includes the plovers, dotterels and lapwings. They are small to medium-sized birds with compact bodies, short, thick necks and long, usually pointed, wings. They are found in open country worldwide, mostly in habitats near water.

- Black-bellied plover, Pluvialis squatarola
- American golden-plover, Pluvialis dominica (A)
- Pacific golden-plover, Pluvialis fulva
- Northern lapwing, Vanellus vanellus
- Gray-headed lapwing, Vanellus cinereus (A)
- Lesser sand-plover, Charadrius mongolus
- Greater sand-plover, Charadrius leschenaultii
- Kentish plover, Charadrius alexandrinus
- White-faced plover, Charadrius dealbatus
- Common ringed plover, Charadrius hiaticula (A)
- Long-billed plover, Charadrius placidus
- Little ringed plover, Charadrius dubius
- Oriental plover, Charadrius veredus (A)
- Eurasian dotterel, Charadrius morinellus (A)

== Painted-snipes ==
Order: Charadriiformes Family: Rostratulidae

Painted-snipe are short-legged, long-billed birds similar in shape to the true snipes, but more brightly coloured.

- Greater painted-snipe, Rostratula benghalensis (A)

== Jacanas ==
Order: Charadriiformes Family: Jacanidae

The jacanas are a group of tropical waders in the family Jacanidae. They are found throughout the tropics. They are identifiable by their huge feet and claws which enable them to walk on floating vegetation in the shallow lakes that are their preferred habitat.

- Pheasant-tailed jacana, Hydrophasianus chirurgus (A)

== Sandpipers and allies ==
Order: Charadriiformes Family: Scolopacidae

Scolopacidae is a large diverse family of small to medium-sized shorebirds including the sandpipers, curlews, godwits, shanks, tattlers, woodcocks, snipes, dowitchers and phalaropes. The majority of these species eat small invertebrates picked out of the mud or soil. Variation in length of legs and bills enables multiple species to feed in the same habitat, particularly on the coast, without direct competition for food.

- Whimbrel, Numenius phaeopus
- Little curlew, Numenius minutus (A)
- Far Eastern curlew, Numenius madagascariensis
- Eurasian curlew, Numenius arquata
- Bar-tailed godwit, Limosa lapponica
- Black-tailed godwit, Limosa limosa
- Hudsonian godwit, Limosa haemastica (A)
- Ruddy turnstone, Arenaria interpres
- Great knot, Calidris tenuirostris
- Red knot, Calidris canutus
- Ruff, Calidris pugnax
- Broad-billed sandpiper, Calidris falcinellus
- Sharp-tailed sandpiper, Calidris acuminata
- Curlew sandpiper, Calidris ferruginea
- Temminck's stint, Calidris temminckii
- Long-toed stint, Calidris subminuta
- Spoon-billed sandpiper, Calidris pygmeus (A)
- Red-necked stint, Calidris ruficollis
- Sanderling, Calidris alba
- Dunlin, Calidris alpina
- Little stint, Calidris minuta (A)
- Buff-breasted sandpiper, Calidris subruficollis (A)
- Pectoral sandpiper, Calidris melanotos (A)
- Western sandpiper, Calidris mauri (A)
- Asian dowitcher, Limnodromus semipalmatus (A)
- Long-billed dowitcher, Limnodromus scolopaceus (A)
- Jack snipe, Lymnocryptes minimus (A)
- Eurasian woodcock, Scolopax rusticola (A)
- Solitary snipe, Gallinago solitaria
- Latham's snipe, Gallinago hardwickii (A)
- Common snipe, Gallinago gallinago
- Pin-tailed snipe, Gallinago stenura
- Swinhoe's snipe, Gallinago megala (A)
- Terek sandpiper, Xenus cinereus
- Wilson's phalarope, Phalaropus tricolor (A)
- Red-necked phalarope, Phalaropus lobatus (A)
- Red phalarope, Phalaropus fulicarius (A)
- Common sandpiper, Actitis hypoleucos
- Green sandpiper, Tringa ochropus
- Gray-tailed tattler, Tringa brevipes
- Spotted redshank, Tringa erythropus
- Greater yellowlegs, Tringa melanoleuca (A)
- Common greenshank, Tringa nebularia
- Nordmann's greenshank, Tringa guttifer
- Marsh sandpiper, Tringa stagnatilis
- Wood sandpiper, Tringa glareola
- Common redshank, Tringa totanus

== Buttonquails ==
Order: Charadriiformes Family: Turnicidae

The buttonquails are small, drab, running birds which resemble the true quails. The female is the brighter of the sexes and initiates courtship. The male incubates the eggs and tends the young.

- Yellow-legged buttonquail, Turnix tanki (A)

== Pratincoles and coursers ==
Order: Charadriiformes Family: Glareolidae

Glareolidae is a family of wading birds comprising the pratincoles, which have short legs, long pointed wings and long forked tails, and the coursers, which have long legs, short wings and long, pointed bills which curve downwards.

- Oriental pratincole, Glareola maldivarum (A)

== Skuas and jaegers ==
Order: Charadriiformes Family: Stercorariidae

The family Stercorariidae are, in general, medium to large birds, typically with grey or brown plumage, often with white markings on the wings. They nest on the ground in temperate and arctic regions and are long-distance migrants.

- South polar skua, Stercorarius maccormicki (A)
- Pomarine jaeger, Stercorarius pomarinus (A)
- Parasitic jaeger, Stercorarius parasiticus
- Long-tailed jaeger, Stercorarius longicaudus (A)

== Auks and murres ==
Order: Charadriiformes Family: Alcidae

Alcids are superficially similar to penguins due to their black-and-white colours, their upright posture and some of their habits, however they are not related to the penguins and differ in being able to fly. Auks live on the open sea, only deliberately coming ashore to nest.

- Dovekie, Alle alle (A)
- Common murre, Uria aalge (A)
- Thick-billed murre, Uria lomvia (A)
- Pigeon guillemot, Cepphus columba (A)
- Spectacled guillemot, Cepphus carbo (A)
- Long-billed murrelet, Brachyramphus perdix
- Ancient murrelet, Synthliboramphus antiquus
- Japanese murrelet, Synthliboramphus wumizusume (A)
- Whiskered auklet, Aethia pygmaea (A)
- Least auklet, Aethia pusilla (A)
- Rhinoceros auklet, Cerorhinca monocerata

== Gulls, terns, and skimmers ==
Order: Charadriiformes Family: Laridae

Laridae is a family of medium to large seabirds, the gulls, terns, and skimmers. Gulls are typically grey or white, often with black markings on the head or wings. They have stout, longish bills and webbed feet. Terns are a group of generally medium to large seabirds typically with grey or white plumage, often with black markings on the head. Most terns hunt fish by diving but some pick insects off the surface of fresh water. Terns are generally long-lived birds, with several species known to live in excess of 30 years.

- Black-legged kittiwake, Rissa tridactyla
- Ivory gull, Pagophila eburnea (A)
- Sabine's gull, Xema sabini (A)
- Saunders's gull, Saundersilarus saundersi
- Slender-billed gull, Chroicocephalus genei (A)
- Black-headed gull, Chroicocephalus ridibundus
- Brown-headed gull, Chroicocephalus brunnicephalus (A)
- Relict gull, Ichthyaetus relictus (A)
- Pallas's gull, Ichthyaetus ichthyaetus (A)
- Black-tailed gull, Larus crassirostris
- Common gull, Larus canus
- Ring-billed gull, Larus delawarensis (A)
- Western gull, Larus occidentalis (A)
- Herring gull, Larus argentatus
- Caspian gull, Larus cachinnans (A)
- Iceland gull, Larus glaucoides (A)
- Lesser black-backed gull, Larus fuscus
- Slaty-backed gull, Larus schistisagus
- Glaucous-winged gull, Larus glaucescens (A)
- Glaucous gull, Larus hyperboreus
- Sooty tern, Onychoprion fuscatus (A)
- Bridled tern, Onychoprion anaethetus (A)
- Aleutian tern, Onychoprion aleuticus (A)
- Little tern, Sternula albifrons
- Gull-billed tern, Gelochelidon nilotica (A)
- Caspian tern, Hydroprogne caspia (A)
- Black tern, Chlidonias niger (A)
- White-winged tern, Chlidonias leucopterus (A)
- Whiskered tern, Chlidonias hybrida
- Roseate tern, Sterna dougallii (A)
- Common tern, Sterna hirundo
- Arctic tern, Sterna paradisaea (A)
- Great crested tern, Thalasseus bergii (A)
- Chinese crested tern, Thalasseus bernsteini (A)

== Loons ==
Order: Gaviiformes Family: Gaviidae

Loons, known as divers in Europe, are a group of aquatic birds found in many parts of North America and northern Europe. They are the size of a large duck or small goose, which they somewhat resemble when swimming, but to which they are completely unrelated.

- Red-throated loon, Gavia stellata
- Arctic loon, Gavia arctica
- Pacific loon, Gavia pacifica
- Yellow-billed loon, Gavia adamsii (A)

== Albatrosses ==
Order: Procellariiformes Family: Diomedeidae

The albatrosses are among the largest of flying birds, and the great albatrosses from the genus Diomedea have the largest wingspans of any extant birds.

- Short-tailed albatross, Phoebastria albatrus (A)

== Northern storm-petrels ==
Order: Procellariiformes Family: Hydrobatidae

The northern storm-petrels are relatives of the petrels and are the smallest seabirds. They feed on planktonic crustaceans and small fish picked from the surface, typically while hovering. The flight is fluttering and sometimes bat-like.

- Swinhoe's storm-petrel, Hydrobates monorhis
- Band-rumped storm-petrel, Hydrobates castro (A)

== Shearwaters and petrels ==
Order: Procellariiformes Family: Procellariidae

The procellariids are the main group of medium-sized "true petrels", characterised by united nostrils with medium septum and a long outer functional primary.

- Bonin petrel, Pterodroma hypoleuca (A)
- Bulwer's petrel, Bulweria bulwerii (A)
- Streaked shearwater, Calonectris leucomelas
- Flesh-footed shearwater, Ardenna carneipes (A)
- Sooty shearwater, Ardenna griseus (A)
- Short-tailed shearwater, Ardenna tenuirostris (A)

== Storks ==
Order: Ciconiiformes Family: Ciconiidae

Storks are large, long-legged, long-necked, wading birds with long, stout bills. Storks are mute, but bill-clattering is an important mode of communication at the nest. Their nests can be large and may be reused for many years. Many species are migratory.

- Black stork, Ciconia nigra (A)
- Oriental stork, Ciconia boyciana

== Frigatebirds ==
Order: Suliformes Family: Fregatidae

Frigatebirds are large seabirds usually found over tropical oceans. They are large, black-and-white or completely black, with long wings and deeply forked tails. The males have coloured inflatable throat pouches. They do not swim or walk and cannot take off from a flat surface. Having the largest wingspan-to-body-weight ratio of any bird, they are essentially aerial, able to stay aloft for more than a week.

- Lesser frigatebird, Fregata ariel (A)
- Great frigatebird, Fregata minor (A)

== Boobies and gannets ==
Order: Suliformes Family: Sulidae

The sulids comprise the gannets and boobies. Both groups are medium to large coastal seabirds that plunge-dive for fish.

- Masked booby, Sula dactylatra (A)
- Brown booby, Sula leucogaster (A)
- Red-footed booby, Sula sula (A)

== Cormorants and shags ==
Order: Suliformes Family: Phalacrocoracidae

Phalacrocoracidae is a family of medium to large coastal, fish-eating seabirds that includes cormorants and shags. Plumage colouration varies, with the majority having mainly dark plumage, some species being black-and-white and a few being colourful.

- Pelagic cormorant, Urile pelagicus
- Great cormorant, Phalacrocorax carbo
- Japanese cormorant, Phalacrocorax capillatus

== Pelicans ==
Order: Pelecaniformes Family: Pelecanidae

Pelicans are large water birds with a distinctive pouch under their beak. As with other members of the order Pelecaniformes, they have webbed feet with four toes.

- Great white pelican, Pelecanus onocrotalus (A)
- Dalmatian pelican, Pelecanus crispus (A)

== Herons, egrets, and bitterns ==
Order: Pelecaniformes Family: Ardeidae

The family Ardeidae contains the bitterns, herons and egrets. Herons and egrets are medium to large wading birds with long necks and legs. Bitterns tend to be shorter necked and more wary. Members of Ardeidae fly with their necks retracted, unlike other long-necked birds such as storks, ibises and spoonbills.

- Great bittern, Botaurus stellaris
- Yellow bittern, Ixobrychus sinensis
- Schrenck's bittern, Ixobrychus eurhythmus (A)
- Cinnamon bittern, Ixobrychus cinnamomeus (A)
- Black bittern, Ixobrychus flavicollis (A)
- Gray heron, Ardea cinerea
- Purple heron, Ardea purpurea (A)
- Great egret, Ardea alba
- Intermediate egret, Ardea intermedia
- Chinese egret, Egretta eulophotes
- Little egret, Egretta garzetta
- Pacific reef-heron, Egretta sacra
- Cattle egret, Bubulcus ibis
- Chinese pond-heron, Ardeola bacchus
- Striated heron, Butorides striata
- Black-crowned night-heron, Nycticorax nycticorax
- Japanese night-heron, Gorsachius goisagi (A)
- Malayan night-heron, Gorsachius melanolophus (A)

== Ibises and spoonbills ==
Order: Pelecaniformes Family: Threskiornithidae

Threskiornithidae is a family of large terrestrial and wading birds which includes the ibises and spoonbills. They have long, broad wings with 11 primary and about 20 secondary feathers. They are strong fliers and despite their size and weight, very capable soarers.

- Glossy ibis, Plegadis falcinellus (A)
- Black-headed ibis, Threskiornis melanocephalus (A)
- Crested ibis, Nipponia nippon (A)(reintroduced)
- Eurasian spoonbill, Platalea leucorodia
- Black-faced spoonbill, Platalea minor

== Osprey ==
Order: Accipitriformes Family: Pandionidae

The family Pandionidae contains only one species, the osprey. The osprey is a medium-large raptor which is a specialist fish-eater with a worldwide distribution.

- Osprey, Pandion haliaetus

== Hawks, eagles, and kites ==
Order: Accipitriformes Family: Accipitridae

Accipitridae is a family of birds of prey, which includes hawks, eagles, kites, harriers and Old World vultures. These birds have powerful hooked beaks for tearing flesh from their prey, strong legs, powerful talons and keen eyesight.

- Black-winged kite, Elanus caeruleus (A)
- Bearded vulture, Gypaetus barbatus (A)
- Oriental honey-buzzard, Pernis ptilorhynchus
- Black baza, Aviceda leuphotes (A)
- Cinereous vulture, Aegypius monachus
- Himalayan griffon, Gyps himalayensis (A)
- Crested serpent-eagle, Spilornis cheela (A)
- Mountain hawk-eagle, Nisaetus nipalensis
- Greater spotted eagle, Clanga clanga (A)
- Booted eagle, Hieraaetus pennatus (A)
- Steppe eagle, Aquila nipalensis (A)
- Imperial eagle, Aquila heliaca (A)
- Golden eagle, Aquila chrysaetos (A)
- Bonelli's eagle, Aquila fasciata (A)
- Gray-faced buzzard, Butastur indicus
- Eastern marsh-harrier, Circus spilonotus (A)
- Hen harrier, Circus cyaneus
- Pied harrier, Circus melanoleucos (A)
- Chinese sparrowhawk, Accipiter soloensis
- Japanese sparrowhawk, Accipiter gularis
- Besra, Accipiter virgatus
- Eurasian sparrowhawk, Accipiter nisus
- Northern goshawk, Accipiter gentilis
- Black kite, Milvus migrans
- White-tailed eagle, Haliaeetus albicilla
- Steller's sea-eagle, Haliaeetus pelagicus
- Rough-legged hawk, Buteo lagopus
- Eastern buzzard, Buteo japonicus
- Upland buzzard, Buteo hemilasius

== Barn owls ==
Order: Strigiformes Family: Tytonidae

Barn owls are medium to large owls with large heads and characteristic heart-shaped faces. They have long strong legs with powerful talons.

- Australasian grass-owl, Tyto longimembris (A)

== Owls ==
Order: Strigiformes Family: Strigidae

The typical owls are small to large solitary nocturnal birds of prey. They have large forward-facing eyes and ears, a hawk-like beak and a conspicuous circle of feathers around each eye called a facial disk.

- Japanese scops-owl, Otus semitorques (A)
- Oriental scops-owl, Otus sunia
- Eurasian eagle-owl, Bubo bubo
- Snowy owl, Bubo scandiacus (A)
- Little owl, Athene noctua (A)
- Himalayan owl, Strix nivicolum (A)
- Ural owl, Strix uralensis (A)
- Long-eared owl, Asio otus (A)
- Short-eared owl, Asio flammeus (A)
- Northern boobook, Ninox japonica

== Hoopoes ==
Order: Bucerotiformes Family: Upupidae

Hoopoes have black, white and orangey-pink colouring with a large erectile crest on their head.

- Eurasian hoopoe, Upupa epops

== Kingfishers ==
Order: Coraciiformes Family: Alcedinidae

Kingfishers are medium-sized birds with large heads, long, pointed bills, short legs and stubby tails.

- Common kingfisher, Alcedo atthis
- Ruddy kingfisher, Halcyon coromanda
- Black-capped kingfisher, Halcyon pileata (A)
- Crested kingfisher, Megaceryle lugubris (A)

== Rollers ==
Order: Coraciiformes Family: Coraciidae

Rollers resemble crows in size and build, but are more closely related to the kingfishers and bee-eaters. They share the colourful appearance of those groups with blues and browns predominating. The two inner front toes are connected, but the outer toe is not.

- Dollarbird, Eurystomus orientalis

== Woodpeckers ==
Order: Piciformes Family: Picidae

Woodpeckers are small to medium-sized birds with chisel-like beaks, short legs, stiff tails and long tongues used for capturing insects. Some species have feet with two toes pointing forward and two backward, while several species have only three toes. Many woodpeckers have the habit of tapping noisily on tree trunks with their beaks.

- Eurasian wryneck, Jynx torquilla
- Gray-capped pygmy woodpecker, Yungipicus canicapillus (A)
- Japanese pygmy woodpecker, Yungipicus kizuki
- Rufous-bellied woodpecker, Dendrocopos hyperythrus (A)
- White-backed woodpecker, Dendrocopos leucotos
- Great spotted woodpecker, Dendrocopos major
- Lesser spotted woodpecker, Dendrocopos minor (A)
- Gray-headed woodpecker, Picus canus
- White-bellied woodpecker, Dryocopus javensis (A)
- Black woodpecker, Dryocopus martius (A)

== Falcons and caracaras ==
Order: Falconiformes Family: Falconidae

Falconidae is a family of diurnal birds of prey. They differ from hawks, eagles and kites in that they kill with their beaks instead of their talons.

- Lesser kestrel, Falco naumanni (A)
- Eurasian kestrel, Falco tinnunculus
- Amur falcon, Falco amurensis
- Merlin, Falco columbarius
- Eurasian hobby, Falco subbuteo
- Saker falcon, Falco cherrug (A)
- Gyrfalcon, Falco rusticolus (A)
- Peregrine falcon, Falco peregrinus

== Pittas ==
Order: Passeriformes Family: Pittidae

Pittas are medium-sized by passerine standards and are stocky, with fairly long, strong legs, short tails and stout bills. Many are brightly coloured. They spend the majority of their time on wet forest floors, eating snails, insects and similar invertebrates.

- Blue-winged pitta, Pitta moluccensis (A)
- Fairy pitta, Pitta nympha

== Cuckooshrikes ==
Order: Passeriformes Family: Campephagidae

The cuckooshrikes are small to medium-sized passerine birds. They are predominantly greyish with white and black, although some species are brightly coloured.

- Ryukyu minivet, Pericrocotus tegimae (A)
- Ashy minivet, Pericrocotus divaricatus
- Brown-rumped minivet, Pericrocotus cantonensis (A)
- Black-winged cuckooshrike, Lalage melaschistos (A)

== Old World orioles ==
Order: Passeriformes Family: Oriolidae

The Old World orioles are colourful passerine birds. They are not related to the New World orioles.

- Black-naped oriole, Oriolus chinensis

== Woodswallows, bellmagpies, and allies ==
Order: Passeriformes Family: Artamidae

The woodswallows are soft-plumaged, somber-coloured passerine birds. They are smooth, agile flyers with moderately large, semi-triangular wings.

- Ashy woodswallow, Artamus fuscus (A)
- White-breasted woodswallow, Artamus leucorynchus (A)

== Drongos ==
Order: Passeriformes Family: Dicruridae

The drongos are mostly black or dark grey in colour, sometimes with metallic tints. They have long forked tails, and some Asian species have elaborate tail decorations. They have short legs and sit very upright when perched, like a shrike. They flycatch or take prey from the ground.

- Black drongo, Dicrurus macrocercus
- Ashy drongo, Dicrurus leucophaeus (A)
- Crow-billed drongo, Dicrurus annectens (A)
- Hair-crested drongo, Dicrurus hottentottus (A)

== Monarch flycatchers ==
Order: Passeriformes Family: Monarchidae

The monarch flycatchers are small to medium-sized insectivorous passerines which hunt by flycatching.

- Japanese paradise-flycatcher, Terpsiphone atrocaudata
- Amur paradise-flycatcher, Terpsiphone incei (A)

== Shrikes ==
Order: Passeriformes Family: Laniidae

Shrikes are passerine birds known for their habit of catching other birds and small animals and impaling the uneaten portions of their bodies on thorns. A typical shrike's beak is hooked, like a bird of prey.

- Tiger shrike, Lanius tigrinus
- Bull-headed shrike, Lanius bucephalus
- Red-backed shrike, Lanius collurio (A)
- Brown shrike, Lanius cristatus
- Long-tailed shrike, Lanius schach (A)
- Gray-backed shrike, Lanius tephronotus (A)
- Northern shrike, Lanius borealis (A)
- Great gray shrike, Lanius excubitor (A)
- Chinese gray shrike, Lanius sphenocercus (A)

== Crows, jays, and magpies ==
Order: Passeriformes Family: Corvidae

The family Corvidae includes crows, ravens, jays, choughs, magpies, treepies, nutcrackers and ground jays. Corvids are above average in size among the Passeriformes, and some of the larger species show high levels of intelligence.

- Eurasian jay, Garrulus glandarius
- Azure-winged magpie, Cyanopica cyana
- Oriental magpie, Pica serica
- Eurasian magpie, Pica pica
- Eurasian nutcracker, Nucifraga caryocatactes (A)
- Red-billed chough, Pyrrhocorax pyrrhocorax (A)
- Daurian jackdaw, Corvus dauuricus
- House crow, Corvus splendens (A)
- Rook, Corvus frugilegus
- Carrion crow, Corvus corone
- Large-billed crow, Corvus macrorhynchos

== Fairy flycatchers ==
Order: Passeriformes Family: Stenostiridae

Most of the species of this small family are found in Africa, though a few inhabit tropical Asia. They are not closely related to other birds called "flycatchers".

- Gray-headed canary-flycatcher, Culicicapa ceylonensis (A)

== Tits, chickadees, and titmice ==
Order: Passeriformes Family: Paridae

The Paridae are mainly small stocky woodland species with short stout bills. Some have crests. They are adaptable birds, with a mixed diet including seeds and insects.

- Coal tit, Periparus ater
- Yellow-bellied tit, Periparus venustulus (A)
- Varied tit, Sittiparus varius
- Marsh tit, Poecile palustris
- Willow tit, Poecile montana (A)
- Azure tit, Cyanistes cyanus (A)
- Great tit, Parus major (A)
- Japanese tit, Parus minor

== Penduline-tits ==
Order: Passeriformes Family: Remizidae

The penduline-tits are a group of small passerine birds related to the true tits. They are insectivores.

- Chinese penduline-tit, Remiz consobrinus

== Larks ==
Order: Passeriformes Family: Alaudidae

Larks are small terrestrial birds with often extravagant songs and display flights. Most larks are fairly dull in appearance. Their food is insects and seeds.

- Horned lark, Eremophila alpestris (A)
- Greater short-toed lark, Calandrella brachydactyla (A)
- Mongolian short-toed lark, Calandrella dukhunensis (A)
- Bimaculated lark, Melanocorypha bimaculata (A)
- Mongolian lark, Melanocorypha mongolica (A)
- Asian short-toed lark, Alaudala cheleensis (A)
- Eurasian skylark, Alauda arvensis
- Crested lark, Galerida cristata (A)

== Bearded reedling ==
Order: Passeriformes Family: Panuridae

This species, the only one in its family, is found in reed beds throughout temperate Europe and Asia.

- Bearded reedling, Panurus biarmicus (A)

== Cisticolas and allies ==
Order: Passeriformes Family: Cisticolidae

The Cisticolidae are warblers found mainly in warmer southern regions of the Old World. They are generally very small birds of drab brown or grey appearance found in open country such as grassland or scrub. There is 1 species which has been recorded in South Korea.

- Zitting cisticola, Cisticola juncidis

== Reed warblers and allies ==
Order: Passeriformes Family: Acrocephalidae

The members of this family are usually rather large for "warblers". Most are rather plain olivaceous brown above with much yellow to beige below. They are usually found in open woodland, reedbeds, or tall grass. The family occurs mostly in southern to western Eurasia and surroundings, but it also ranges far into the Pacific, with some species in Africa.

- Thick-billed warbler, Arundinax aedon (A)
- Booted warbler, Iduna caligata (A)
- Black-browed reed warbler, Acrocephalus bistrigiceps
- Paddyfield warbler, Acrocephalus agricola (A)
- Manchurian reed warbler, Acrocephalus tangorum (A)
- Oriental reed warbler, Acrocephalus orientalis

== Grassbirds and allies ==
Order: Passeriformes Family: Locustellidae

Locustellidae are a family of small insectivorous songbirds found mainly in Eurasia, Africa, and the Australian region. They are smallish birds with tails that are usually long and pointed, and tend to be drab brownish or buffy all over.

- Gray's grasshopper warbler, Helopsaltes fasciolatus (A)
- Marsh grassbird, Helopsaltes pryeri (A)
- Pallas's grasshopper warbler, Helopsaltes certhiola (A)
- Middendorff's grasshopper warbler, Helopsaltes ochotensis (A)
- Pleske's grasshopper warbler, Helopsaltes pleskei (A)
- Lanceolated warbler, Locustella lanceolata (A)
- Chinese bush warbler, Locustella tacsanowskia (A)
- Baikal bush warbler, Locustella davidi (A)

== Swallows ==
Order: Passeriformes Family: Hirundinidae

The family Hirundinidae is adapted to aerial feeding. They have a slender streamlined body, long pointed wings and a short bill with a wide gape. The feet are adapted to perching rather than walking, and the front toes are partially joined at the base.

- Bank swallow, Riparia riparia
- Pale sand martin, Riparia diluta (A)
- Eurasian crag-martin, Ptyonoprogne rupestris (A)
- Barn swallow, Hirundo rustica
- Pacific swallow, Hirundo tahitica (A)
- Red-rumped swallow, Cecropis daurica
- Common house-martin, Delichon urbicum (A)
- Asian house-martin, Delichon dasypus

== Bulbuls ==
Order: Passeriformes Family: Pycnonotidae

Bulbuls are medium-sized songbirds. Some are colourful with yellow, red or orange vents, cheeks, throats or supercilia, but most are drab, with uniform olive-brown to black plumage. Some species have distinct crests.

- Light-vented bulbul, Pycnonotus sinensis
- Black bulbul, Hypsipetes leucocephalus (A)
- Brown-eared bulbul, Hypsipetes amaurotis

== Leaf warblers ==
Order: Passeriformes Family: Phylloscopidae

Leaf warblers are a family of small insectivorous birds found mostly in Eurasia and ranging into Wallacea and Africa. The species are of various sizes, often green-plumaged above and yellow below, or more subdued with grayish-green to grayish-brown colors.

- Wood warbler, Phylloscopus sibilatrix (A)
- Yellow-browed warbler, Phylloscopus inornatus
- Hume's warbler, Phylloscopus humei (A)
- Chinese leaf warbler, Phylloscopus yunnanensis (A)
- Pallas's leaf warbler, Phylloscopus regulus
- Radde's warbler, Phylloscopus schwarzi
- Yellow-streaked warbler, Phylloscopus armandii (A)
- Tickell's leaf warbler, Phylloscopus affinis (A)
- Dusky warbler, Phylloscopus fuscatus
- Buff-throated warbler, Phylloscopus subaffinis (A)
- Willow warbler, Phylloscopus trochilus (A)
- Common chiffchaff, Phylloscopus collybita (A)
- Eastern crowned warbler, Phylloscopus coronatus
- Martens's warbler, Phylloscopus omeiensis (A)
- Alström's warbler, Phylloscopus soror (A)
- Two-barred warbler, Phylloscopus plumbeitarsus (A)
- Pale-legged leaf warbler, Phylloscopus tenellipes
- Sakhalin leaf warbler, Phylloscopus borealoides (A)
- Japanese leaf warbler, Phylloscopus xanthodryas (A)
- Arctic warbler, Phylloscopus borealis
- Kamchatka leaf warbler, Phylloscopus examinandus (A)
- Claudia's leaf warbler, Phylloscopus claudiae (A)

== Bush warblers and allies ==
Order: Passeriformes Family: Scotocercidae

The members of this family are found throughout Africa, Asia, and Polynesia. Their taxonomy is in flux, and some authorities place some genera in other families.

- Asian stubtail, Urosphena squameiceps (A)
- Japanese bush warbler, Horornis diphone
- Manchurian bush warbler, Horornis borealis

== Long-tailed tits ==
Order: Passeriformes Family: Aegithalidae

Long-tailed tits are a group of small passerine birds with medium to long tails. They make woven bag nests in trees. Most eat a mixed diet which includes insects.

- Long-tailed tit, Aegithalos caudatus
- Silver-throated tit, Aegithalos glaucogularis (A)

== Sylviid warblers, parrotbills, and allies ==
Order: Passeriformes Family: Sylviidae

The family Sylviidae is a group of small insectivorous passerine birds. They mainly occur as breeding species, as the common name implies, in Europe, Asia and, to a lesser extent, Africa. Most are of generally undistinguished appearance, but many have distinctive songs.

- Barred warbler, Curruca nisoria (A)
- Lesser whitethroat, Curruca curruca (A)
- Beijing babbler, Rhopophilus pekinensis
- Vinous-throated parrotbill, Sinosuthora webbiana

== White-eyes, yuhinas, and allies ==
Order: Passeriformes Family: Zosteropidae

The white-eyes are small and mostly undistinguished, their plumage above being generally some dull colour like greenish-olive, but some species have a white or bright yellow throat, breast or lower parts, and several have buff flanks. As their name suggests, many species have a white ring around each eye.

- Chestnut-flanked white-eye, Zosterops erythropleurus (A)
- Swinhoe's white-eye, Zosterops simplex (A)
- Warbling white-eye, Zosterops japonicus

== Kinglets ==
Order: Passeriformes Family: Regulidae

The kinglets, also called crests, are a small group of birds often included in the Old World warblers, but frequently given family status because they also resemble the titmice.

- Goldcrest, Regulus regulus

== Nuthatches ==
Order: Passeriformes Family: Sittidae

Nuthatches are small woodland birds. They have the unusual ability to climb down trees head first, unlike other birds which can only go upwards. Nuthatches have big heads, short tails and powerful bills and feet.

- Eurasian nuthatch, Sitta europaea
- Snowy-browed nuthatch, Sitta villosa (A)

== Treecreepers ==
Order: Passeriformes Family: Certhiidae

Treecreepers are small woodland birds, brown above and white below. They have thin pointed down-curved bills, which they use to extricate insects from bark. They have stiff tail feathers, like woodpeckers, which they use to support themselves on vertical trees.

- Eurasian treecreeper, Certhia familiaris

== Wrens ==
Order: Passeriformes Family: Troglodytidae

The wrens are mainly small and inconspicuous except for their loud songs. These birds have short wings and thin down-turned bills. Several species often hold their tails upright. All are insectivorous.

- Eurasian wren, Troglodytes troglodytes

== Dippers ==
Order: Passeriformes Family: Cinclidae

Dippers are a group of perching birds whose habitat includes aquatic environments in the Americas, Europe and Asia. They are named for their bobbing or dipping movements.

- Brown dipper, Cinclus pallasii

== Starlings ==
Order: Passeriformes Family: Sturnidae

Starlings are small to medium-sized passerine birds. Their flight is strong and direct and they are very gregarious. Their preferred habitat is fairly open country. They eat insects and fruit. Plumage is typically dark with a metallic sheen.

- European starling, Sturnus vulgaris
- Rosy starling, Pastor roseus (A)
- Daurian starling, Agropsar sturninus (A)
- Chestnut-cheeked starling, Agropsar philippensis
- White-shouldered starling, Sturnia sinensis (A)
- Red-billed starling, Spodiopsar sericeus (A)
- White-cheeked starling, Spodiopsar cineraceus
- Javan myna, Acridotheres javanicus (A)
- Crested myna, Acridotheres cristatellus (A)

== Thrushes and allies ==
Order: Passeriformes Family: Turdidae

The thrushes are a group of passerine birds that occur mainly in the Old World. They are plump, soft plumaged, small to medium-sized insectivores or sometimes omnivores, often feeding on the ground. Many have attractive songs.

- White's thrush, Zoothera aurea
- Siberian thrush, Geokichla sibirica
- Orange-headed thrush, Geokichla citrina (A)
- Chinese thrush, Otocichla mupinensis (A)
- Redwing, Turdus iliacus (A)
- Chinese blackbird, Turdus mandarinus (A)
- Japanese thrush, Turdus cardis
- Gray-backed thrush, Turdus hortulorum
- Eyebrowed thrush, Turdus obscurus
- Brown-headed thrush, Turdus chrysolaus (A)
- Pale thrush, Turdus pallidus
- Fieldfare, Turdus pilaris (A)
- Black-throated thrush, Turdus atrogularis (A)
- Red-throated thrush, Turdus ruficollis (A)
- Dusky thrush, Turdus eunomus
- Naumann's thrush, Turdus naumanni

== Old World flycatchers ==
Order: Passeriformes Family: Muscicapidae

Old World flycatchers are a large group of small passerine birds native to the Old World. They are mainly small arboreal insectivores. The appearance of these birds is highly varied, but they mostly have weak songs and harsh calls.

- Gray-streaked flycatcher, Muscicapa griseisticta
- Dark-sided flycatcher, Muscicapa sibirica
- Ferruginous flycatcher, Muscicapa ferruginea (A)
- Asian brown flycatcher, Muscicapa dauurica
- Brown-breasted flycatcher, Muscicapa muttui (A)
- Oriental magpie-robin, Copsychus saularis (A)
- Chinese blue flycatcher, Cyornis glaucicomans (A)
- Fujian niltava, Niltava davidi (A)
- Blue-and-white flycatcher, Cyanoptila cyanomelana
- Zappey's flycatcher, Cyanoptila cumatilis (A)
- Verditer flycatcher, Eumyias thalassinus (A)
- European robin, Erithacus rubecula (A)
- Rufous-tailed robin, Larvivora sibilans
- Japanese robin, Larvivora akahige (A)
- Siberian blue robin, Larvivora cyane (A)
- Bluethroat, Luscinia svecica
- Siberian rubythroat, Calliope calliope
- Red-flanked bluetail, Tarsiger cyanurus
- Yellow-rumped flycatcher, Ficedula zanthopygia
- Green-backed flycatcher, Ficedula elisae (A)
- Narcissus flycatcher, Ficedula narcissina
- Ryukyu flycatcher, Ficedula owstoni (A)
- Mugimaki flycatcher, Ficedula mugimaki
- Slaty-blue flycatcher, Ficedula tricolor (A)
- Taiga flycatcher, Ficedula albicilla
- Red-breasted flycatcher, Ficedula parva (A)
- Plumbeous redstart, Phoenicurus fuliginosus (A)
- White-capped redstart, Phoenicurus leucocephalus (A)
- White-winged redstart, Phoenicurus erythrogastrus (A)
- Black redstart, Phoenicurus ochruros (A)
- Daurian redstart, Phoenicurus auroreus
- White-throated rock-thrush, Monticola gularis (A)
- Blue rock-thrush, Monticola solitarius
- Amur stonechat, Saxicola stejnegeri
- Gray bushchat, Saxicola ferreus (A)
- Northern wheatear, Oenanthe oenanthe (A)
- Isabelline wheatear, Oenanthe isabellina (A)
- Desert wheatear, Oenanthe deserti (A)
- Pied wheatear, Oenanthe pleschanka (A)

== Waxwings ==
Order: Passeriformes Family: Bombycillidae

The waxwings are a group of birds with soft silky plumage and unique red tips to some of the wing feathers. In the Bohemian and cedar waxwings, these tips look like sealing wax and give the group its name. These are arboreal birds of northern forests. They live on insects in summer and berries in winter.

- Bohemian waxwing, Bombycilla garrulus
- Japanese waxwing, Bombycilla japonica

== Waxbills and allies ==
Order: Passeriformes Family: Estrildidae

The estrildid finches are small passerine birds of the Old World tropics and Australasia. They are gregarious and often colonial seed eaters with short thick but pointed bills. They are all similar in structure and habits, but have wide variation in plumage colours and patterns.

- Scaly-breasted munia, Lonchura punctulata (A)

== Accentors ==
Order: Passeriformes Family: Prunellidae

The accentors are in the only bird family, Prunellidae, which is completely endemic to the Palearctic. They are small, fairly drab species superficially similar to Old World sparrows.

- Alpine accentor, Prunella collaris (A)
- Siberian accentor, Prunella montanella
- Japanese accentor, Prunella rubida (A)

== Old World sparrows ==
Order: Passeriformes Family: Passeridae

Old World sparrows are small passerine birds. In general, sparrows tend to be small, plump, brown or grey birds with short tails and short powerful beaks. Sparrows are seed eaters, but they also consume small insects.

- House sparrow, Passer domesticus (A)
- Russet sparrow, Passer cinnamomeus
- Eurasian tree sparrow, Passer montanus

== Wagtails and pipits ==
Order: Passeriformes Family: Motacillidae

Motacillidae is a family of small passerine birds with medium to long tails. They include the wagtails, longclaws and pipits. They are slender, ground feeding insectivores of open country.

- Forest wagtail, Dendronanthus indicus
- Gray wagtail, Motacilla cinerea
- Western yellow wagtail, Motacilla flava (A)
- Eastern yellow wagtail, Motacilla tschutschensis
- Citrine wagtail, Motacilla citreola (A)
- Japanese wagtail, Motacilla grandis
- White wagtail, Motacilla alba
- Richard's pipit, Anthus richardi
- Blyth's pipit, Anthus godlewskii (A)
- Meadow pipit, Anthus pratensis (A)
- Rosy pipit, Anthus roseatus (A)
- Tree pipit, Anthus trivialis (A)
- Olive-backed pipit, Anthus hodgsoni
- Pechora pipit, Anthus gustavi
- Red-throated pipit, Anthus cervinus
- Water pipit, Anthus spinoletta (A)
- American pipit, Anthus rubescens

== Finches, euphonias, and allies ==
Order: Passeriformes Family: Fringillidae

Finches are seed-eating passerine birds, that are small to moderately large and have a strong beak, usually conical and in some species very large. All have twelve tail feathers and nine primaries. These birds have a bouncing flight with alternating bouts of flapping and gliding on closed wings, and most sing well.

- Brambling, Fringilla montifringilla
- Hawfinch, Coccothraustes coccothraustes
- Yellow-billed grosbeak, Eophona migratoria
- Japanese grosbeak, Eophona personata
- Common rosefinch, Carpodacus erythrinus
- Long-tailed rosefinch, Carpodacus sibiricus
- Pallas's rosefinch, Carpodacus roseus
- Eurasian bullfinch, Pyrrhula pyrrhula
- Asian rosy-finch, Leucosticte arctoa (A)
- Oriental greenfinch, Chloris sinica
- Common redpoll, Acanthis flammea (A)
- Hoary redpoll, Acanthis hornemanni (A)
- Red crossbill, Loxia curvirostra (A)
- White-winged crossbill, Loxia leucoptera (A)
- Eurasian siskin, Spinus spinus

== Longspurs and snow buntings ==
Order: Passeriformes Family: Calcariidae

The Calcariidae are a group of passerine birds which had been traditionally grouped with the New World sparrows, but differ in a number of respects and are usually found in open grassy areas.

- Lapland longspur, Calcarius lapponicus
- Snow bunting, Plectrophenax nivalis (A)

== Old World buntings ==
Order: Passeriformes Family: Emberizidae

The emberizids are a large family of passerine birds. They are seed-eating birds with distinctively shaped bills. Many emberizid species have distinctive head patterns.

- Black-headed bunting, Emberiza melanocephala (A)
- Red-headed bunting, Emberiza bruniceps (A)
- Chestnut-eared bunting, Emberiza fucata
- Godlewski's bunting, Emberiza godlewskii (A)
- Meadow bunting, Emberiza cioides
- Yellowhammer, Emberiza citrinella (A)
- Pine bunting, Emberiza leucocephalos (A)
- Ortolan bunting, Emberiza hortulana (A)
- Yellow-throated bunting, Emberiza elegans
- Ochre-rumped bunting, Emberiza yessoensis (A)
- Pallas's bunting, Emberiza pallasi
- Reed bunting, Emberiza schoeniclus
- Yellow-breasted bunting, Emberiza aureola
- Little bunting, Emberiza pusilla
- Rustic bunting, Emberiza rustica
- Yellow bunting, Emberiza sulphurata
- Black-faced bunting, Emberiza spodocephala
- Chestnut bunting, Emberiza rutila
- Yellow-browed bunting, Emberiza chrysophrys
- Tristram's bunting, Emberiza tristrami
- Gray bunting, Emberiza variabilis (A)

== New World sparrows ==
Order: Passeriformes Family: Passerellidae

Until 2017, these species were considered part of the family Emberizidae. Most of the species are known as sparrows, but these birds are not closely related to the Old World sparrows which are in the family Passeridae. Many of these have distinctive head patterns.

- White-crowned sparrow, Zonotrichia leucophrys (A)
- Golden-crowned sparrow, Zonotrichia atricapilla (A)
- Savannah sparrow, Passerculus sandwichensis (A)

== See also ==
- List of birds
- Lists of birds by region
