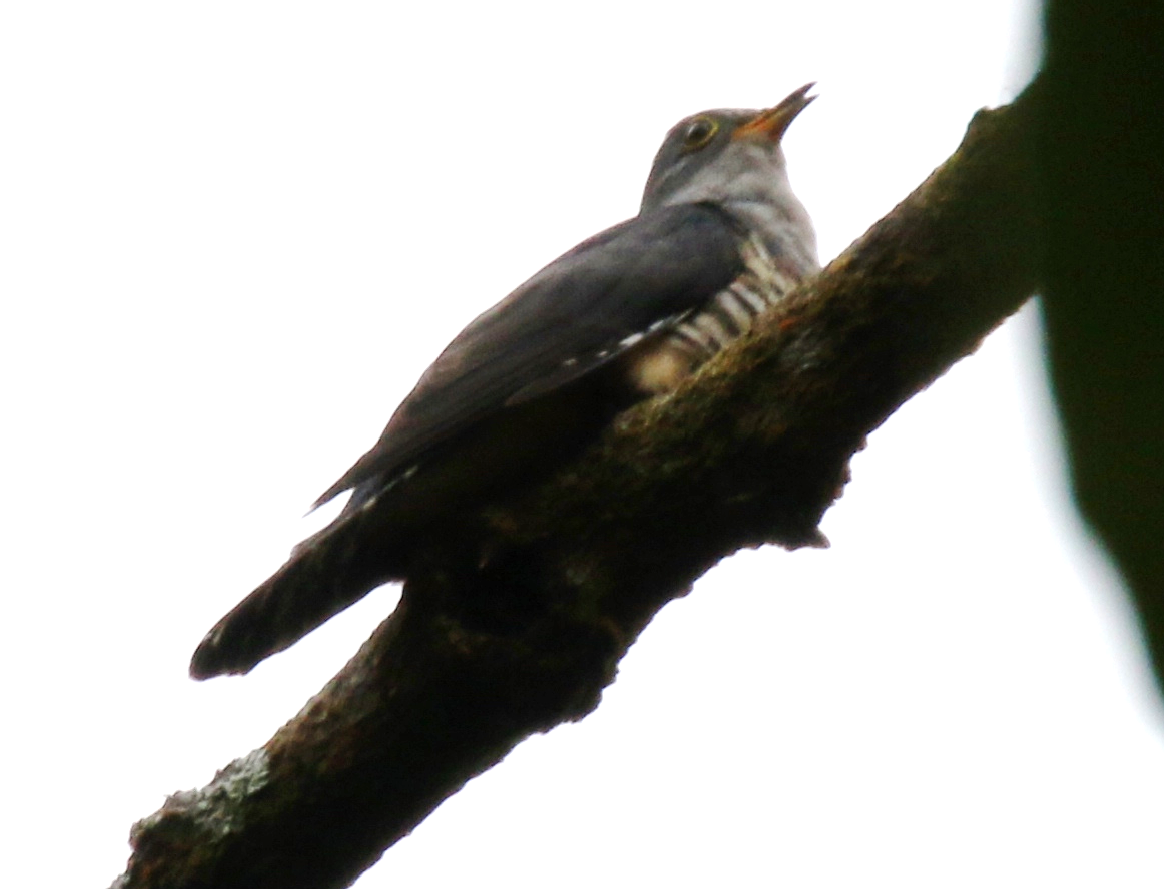
- Mount Kinabalu Nat'l Park - Sabah, Borneo - Malaysia

Conservation status
- Least Concern (IUCN 3.1)

Scientific classification
- Kingdom: Animalia
- Phylum: Chordata
- Class: Aves
- Order: Cuculiformes
- Family: Cuculidae
- Genus: Cuculus
- Species: C. lepidus

Binomial name
- Cuculus lepidus Müller, S, 1845

= Sunda cuckoo =

Species of bird

The Sunda cuckoo or Sunda lesser cuckoo (Cuculus lepidus) is a South-east Asian bird belonging to the genus Cuculus in the cuckoo family, Cuculidae. It was formerly classified with the Himalayan cuckoo (C. saturatus) and Oriental cuckoo (C. optatus) in a single species, C. saturatus, but is now often regarded as a separate species based on differences in voice, size and plumage.

== Description ==
It is 29–30 cm long. The upperparts, throat and upper breast are dark grey. The rest of the underparts are buff with black bars. The tail is blackish with white spots. The female also occurs in a rufous form which has reddish-brown upperparts, paler underparts and black barring both above and below. The Himalayan cuckoo and Oriental cuckoo are similar to the Sunda cuckoo but paler with less buff-coloured underparts and narrower black bars.

The song of the Sunda cuckoo usually consists of a short first note followed by two or three longer and lower "hoop" notes. The whole song is higher-pitched than that of the Himalayan cuckoo which gives three or four "hoop" notes.

== Taxonomy ==
It was first described as a species in 1845 by the German naturalist Salomon Müller. In 1940 it was included in the lesser cuckoo (C. poliocephalus) by James Lee Peters in his Check-list of the Birds of the World. In 1975 J. H. Becking concluded that it was a form of C. saturatus based on similarities in the voice, the colour and ultra-structure of the eggshell and selection of a host to rear the young. Ben King proposed in 2005 that it should be regarded as a distinct species based on differences in size and plumage and a new study of the voice.

Two subspecies are often recognised. C. l. lepidus is the form found in most of the bird's range. The subspecies C. l. insulindae occurs in Borneo and can be distinguished by its darker underparts.

== Distribution and habitat ==
Its range covers the Malay Peninsula, Borneo, Sumatra, Java, Bali, Seram and the Lesser Sunda Islands east to Timor. It is non-migratory unlike the Himalayan and Oriental cuckoos which overlap in range with it during the northern winter. It occurs in forests, mainly in mountainous areas. It is found at altitudes of 950–1700 m in the Malay Peninsula, 1300–2700 m in Borneo and above 1000 m in Java, Sumatra and Wallacea. It is believed to be slowly declining in numbers but still has a sizable range and population so its status is classed as Least Concern by BirdLife International.

== Behaviour ==
It feeds mainly on insects, particularly caterpillars, and will also eat fruit. It is a secretive bird which is hard to find except when calling.

It is a brood parasite, laying its eggs in the nests of other birds. It has been recorded using the nests of the chestnut-crowned warbler in the Malay Peninsula, mountain leaf warbler and yellow-breasted warbler in Sabah and mountain leaf warbler, Sunda warbler and Sunda bush warbler in Java. The eggs are whitish with brown spots.
