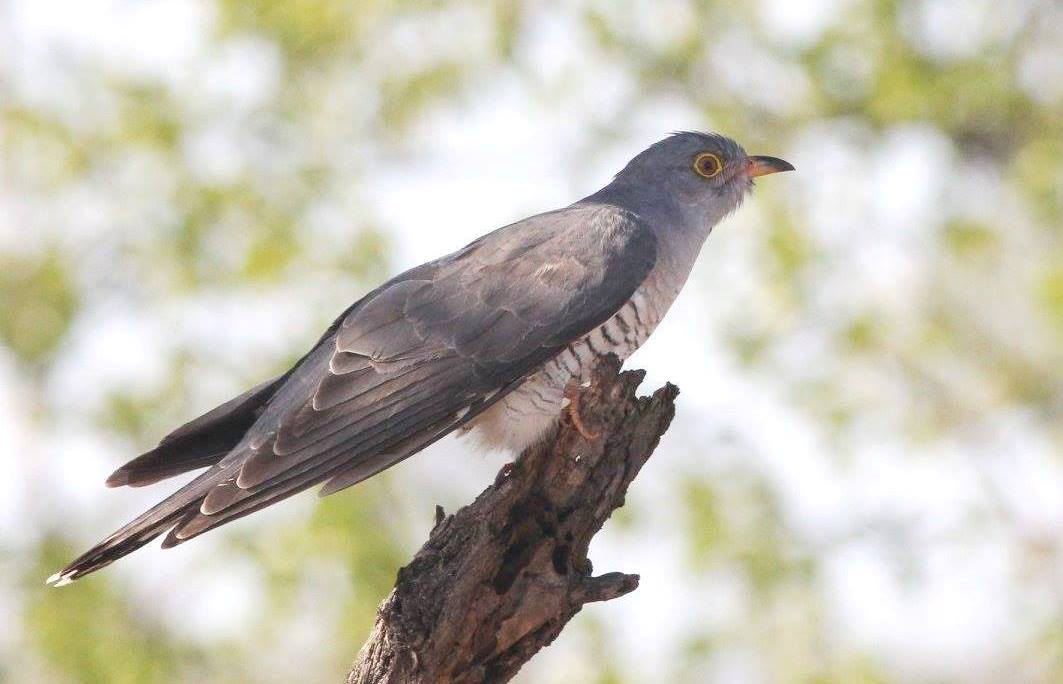
- Adult male in the Kruger National Park

Conservation status
- Least Concern (IUCN 3.1)

Scientific classification
- Kingdom: Animalia
- Phylum: Chordata
- Class: Aves
- Order: Cuculiformes
- Family: Cuculidae
- Genus: Cuculus
- Species: C. gularis

Binomial name
- Cuculus gularis Stephens, 1815

= African cuckoo =

Species of bird

The African cuckoo or African grey cuckoo (Cuculus gularis) is a species of cuckoo in the family Cuculidae. It is found in Sub-Saharan Africa where it migrates within the continent, generally arriving and breeding in any one locality during the rainy season. A fairly common bird, the International Union for Conservation of Nature has rated its conservation status as being of "least concern".

== Description ==
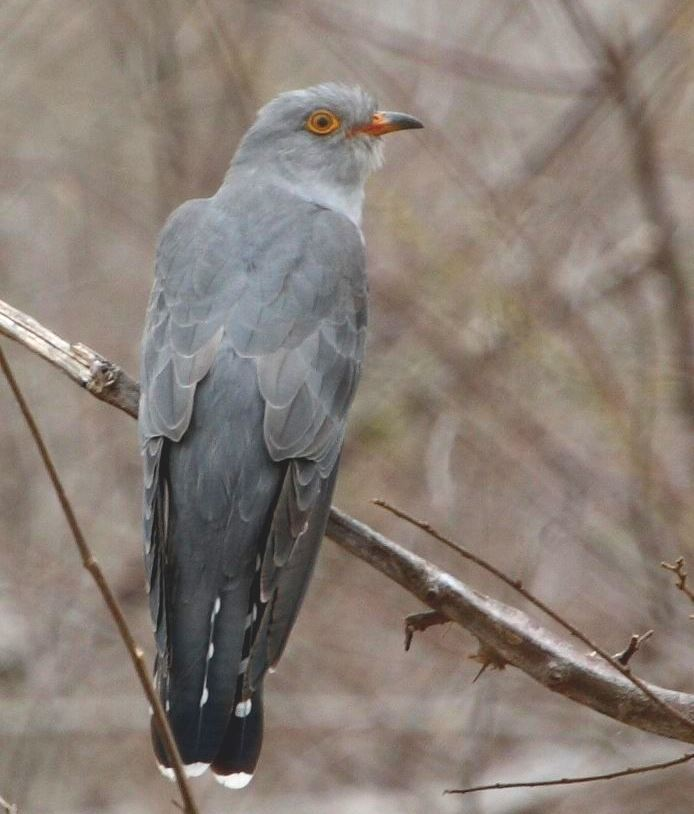
The upper tail covers are grey like those of a common cuckoo, rather than blackish as in lesser or Madagascar cuckoos.

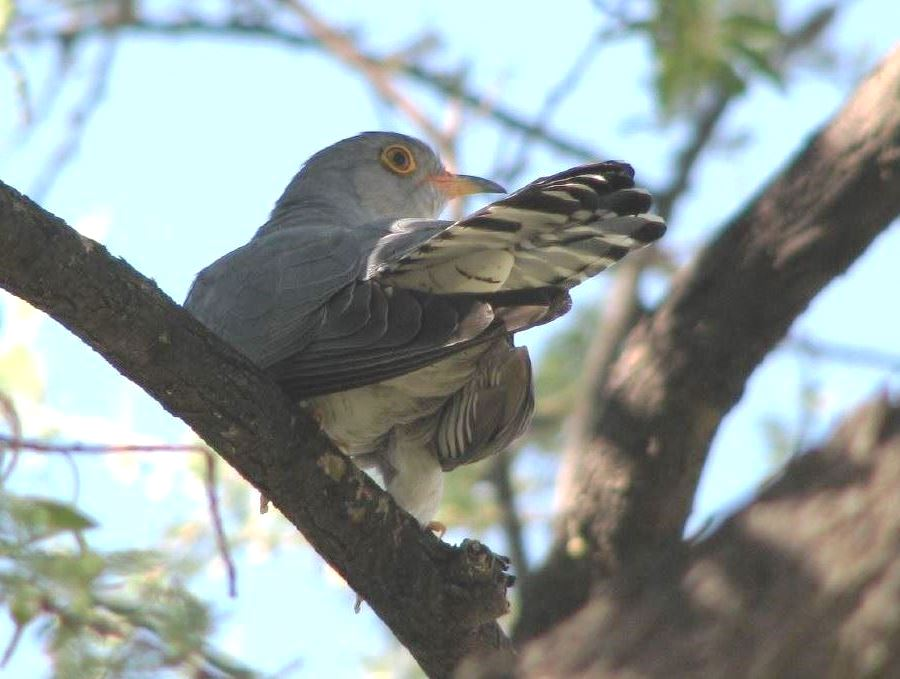
Tail barring is complete, unlike the common cuckoo which has the outer rectrices incompletely barred.

This is a medium-sized species with a long tail, with a total length of 32 cm (13 in). Its dashing flight makes it resemble a bird of prey. The sexes are similar, the head, upper parts and wings being dark grey, the throat and breast pale grey and the belly white barred with dark grey. The tail is dark grey with dark barring and a white tip. The eye is yellow in the male and light brown in the female. The beak is yellow, tipped with black or horn. The legs and feet are yellowish. The juvenile has two colour forms; the grey morph is greyer than the adult with white barring, the underparts being creamy-white with dense dark barring; the hepatic morph is brown rather than grey, the white being replaced by buff or a tawny hue. The call of the male is a "coo-coo" with the second note higher and louder than the first. The female utters a bubbling "Kwik-kwik-kwik".

== Distribution and habitat ==
The African cuckoo occurs in Angola, Benin, Botswana, Burkina Faso, Cameroon, Central African Republic, Chad, Republic of the Congo, DRC, Ivory Coast, Djibouti, Eritrea, Eswatini, Ethiopia, Gabon, Gambia, Ghana, Guinea-Bissau, Kenya, Liberia, Malawi, Mali, Mauritania, Mozambique, Namibia, Niger, Nigeria, Rwanda, Senegal, Sierra Leone, Somalia, South Africa, Sudan, Tanzania, Togo, Uganda, Zambia, and Zimbabwe. The birds migrate to West Africa with the arrival of the rainy season, breed there and then depart, although in some localities such as Nigeria, they seem to be present all year round. In East Africa their arrival also coincides with the rainy season, and they may be present from October to May, and in southern Africa they are present from September to April. Their typical habitat is savannah with scattered acacia trees and open woodland. They are not present in dense forest or in arid regions. They are fairly common birds but inconspicuous except when calling.

== Ecology ==
This species is generally solitary. It feeds in trees and on the ground for insects, foraging through the foliage and probing cattle dung. The diet consists mainly of both hairy and smooth caterpillars, but also includes other insects such as beetles and winged termites. It perches almost vertically. The male is territorial, and in southern Africa, a pair of African cuckoos occupy a territory of greater than 60 hectares (150 acres), driving off other cuckoos.

Like many other cuckoos, the African cuckoo is a brood parasite, the female laying her eggs in the nests of birds of other species, removing an egg already present in the nest. Target hosts vary across the range, and the cuckoo's eggs usually closely match in colour and size the eggs of the host species; the yellow-billed shrike (Corvinella corvina) and fork-tailed drongo (Dicrurus adsimilis) are often targeted . Incubation lasts between twelve and seventeen days, but usually twelve days, with the eggs hatching before those of the host. The cuckoo chick ejects from the nest any other eggs and nestlings it encounters. Its eyes open after eight days and it fledges in three weeks, remaining dependent on its foster parents for several more weeks. Breeding success rate in South Africa is up to 38 percent, and one yellow-billed shrike nest was abandoned by the foster-parents before the cuckoo chick fledged, with a new nest being built elsewhere. A study in Zambia releveled that African cuckoo would have its eggs rejected by a fork-tailed drongo host with rate of rejection as high as 93.7%.

== Status ==
C. gularis is a fairly common bird with a wide range. No particular threats have been identified and the population is believed to be steady, so the International Union for Conservation of Nature has rated its conservation status as being of "least concern".
