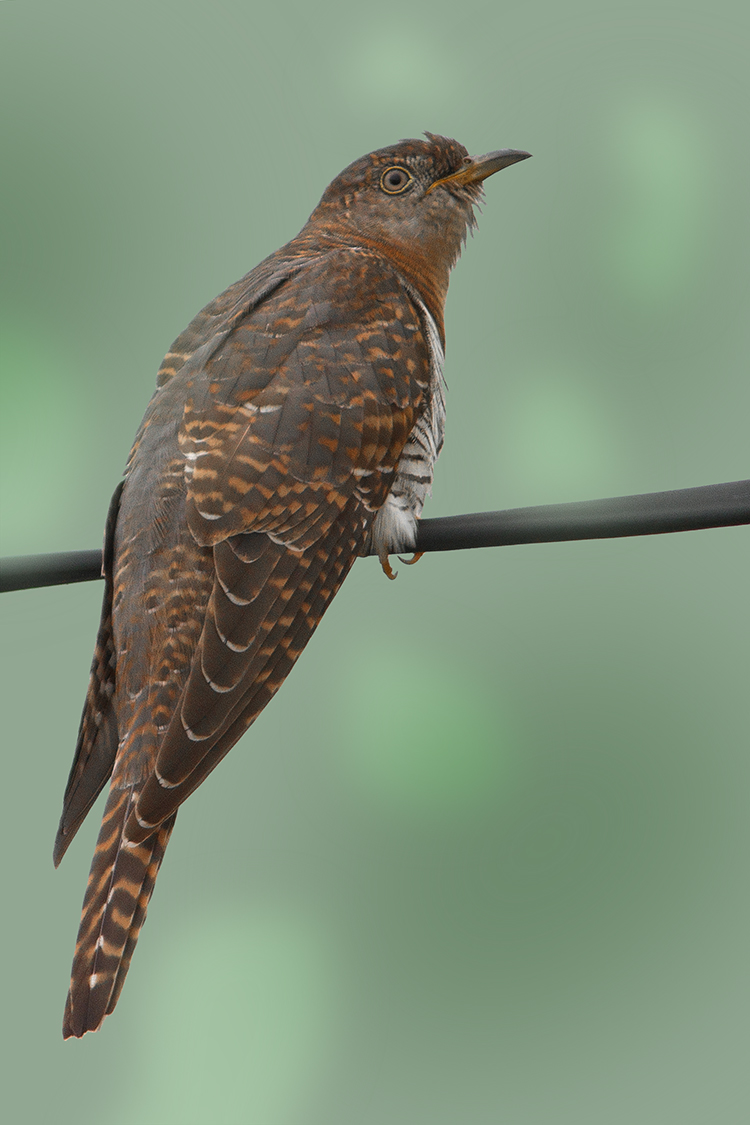
- From Gnathang Valley East Sikkim, India

Conservation status
- Least Concern (IUCN 3.1)

Scientific classification
- Kingdom: Animalia
- Phylum: Chordata
- Class: Aves
- Order: Cuculiformes
- Family: Cuculidae
- Genus: Cuculus
- Species: C. saturatus

Binomial name
- Cuculus saturatus Blyth, 1843

Audio
- Calls

= Himalayan cuckoo =

Species of bird

The Himalayan cuckoo or Oriental cuckoo (Cuculus saturatus) is a brooding parasitic bird that is part of the Cuculidae family. The species breeds from the Himalayas eastward to southern China and Taiwan. It migrates to southeast Asia and the Greater Sunda Islands for the winter.

It was formerly known as "Oriental cuckoo" and contained several subspecies found over most of Asia. In 2005, it was determined that this "species" consists of three distinct lineages:

- Himalayan cuckoo, Cuculus (saturatus) saturatus
- Oriental cuckoo proper, Cuculus (saturatus) optatus
- Sunda cuckoo, Cuculus (saturatus) lepidus

These are usually seen as distinct species nowadays. As the type specimen of the former "Oriental" cuckoo is a bird of the Himalayan population, the name saturatus applies to the Himalayan cuckoo if it is considered a species.

== Taxonomy ==
With new information from a recent mtDNA study, it appears that the Himalayan cuckoo is most closely related to Cuculus canorus, creating a sister-clade with the two other species: C.gularis and C.rochii. The species C.optatus, previously named horsfieldi for Palearctic populations but was proven unsuitable, is considered a separate species because their songs were determined distinct enough. However, there is still some debate implying the differences are within range of variation from saturatus. It was only until recently that C.saturatus was considered one and the same with C.lepidus, but are now recognized as two separate species.

The Himalayan cuckoo is essentially identical to the Oriental cuckoo (C.optatus) and is also often paired with the Common cuckoo (C.canorus), but has wings with much broader and widely spaced black bars. The Common cuckoo has brown and white bars below the bend of the wings with a plain rufous, whereas the Himalayan is unbarred at the bend with a rufous morph of dark bars and undertail coverts. Both species have distinctly different calls.

== Description ==
=== Appearance ===
Adult male Himalayan cuckoos are dark ashy-grey above with a brown, almost black, tail that is whitely spotted and tipped. Legs and feet range between yellow and orange. The area from their chins to the breast is ash-grey, with their lower breast and abdomen being white with black bars, and a white to milky orange vent with varying bars. The eye-ring is yellow with yellow to brown irises—darker orange has been seen in males. Bills are black with an orange-yellow or green-yellow base. Their size approximately 30–35 cm and 70–140 g.

Females are almost the same, but with rufous tinge to breast, and sometimes the rump and upper tail-coverts rufous with dark bars. Seen with dark-barred rufous upperparts, head, tail and wings, former with white tips. The sides of the head to breast are off-white with dark bars. The rest of underparts are white with black barring.

Juveniles have brown irises and are slate grey above with white edges, barred white and black below, and have a black throat with white bars. There are two plumage morphs in both sexes of which are grey and hepatic, their irises changing to a creamy grey to blackish brown color, with a dully-colored bill.

=== Vocalizations ===
Males are notably recorded more during dawn and dusk from high lookouts or in flight. Their call includes a high note followed by three lower flat notes, similar to "hoop, hoop-hoop" or "tun-tadun", much like that of a Common Hoopoe (Upupa epops) but lower-pitched and more muffled. The males also produce hoarse croaking sounds and chuckles, even a harsh "gaak-gaak-gak-ak-ak-ak" at times.

The females' call contains a bubbling "quick-quick-quick".

== Distribution and habitat ==
=== Range and migration ===
The Himalayan cuckoo can be found throughout northeast Pakistan, the northern Indian subcontinent to southern China in warm weather, spotted along Thailand, Taiwan, Nepal, Assam, Kashmir, and Burma. In the winters, it ranges from southeast Asia to northern Australia, including Malaysia, the Philippines, Indonesia and New Guinea in the months of October to May. With C.optatus looking nearly identical to saturatus and having its winter range overlapping much of the same regions, this is another reason why the two species are often misidentified with each other.

When it is breeding season, the cuckoo favors the Oriental Region and the Himalayas through southeast Asia to east China and Taiwan and is rarely found above 1000m. The best breeding areas for C.saturatus in the summer is from late April to August in the Kashmir region and March through September surrounding Nepal. During the non-breeding season, it will be seen in southeast Asia, the Greater Sundas and the Philippines.

=== Habitat ===
The species usually inhabits mixed coniferous and deciduous forests, thickets, birches and mountain forests or steppes with bushes and other wooded areas and orchards during the spring and summer seasons. Usually occurring above tree-lines of 1500m to 3300m in Kashmir, Myanmar and Nepal, and even up to 4500m in southwest China. For the colder seasons, it lives in primary and secondary tropical forests, savannas, gardens and teak on plantations, monsoon rainforests. More occasionally over the more recent years, it is found in swamps, mangroves and plantations of Australia and general low elevation habitats of the Malay Peninsula, Sumatra and Borneo at 1200 to 2000m.

== Behaviour ==
=== Feeding ===
The diet of a Himalayan cuckoo consists mainly of insects—especially caterpillars, both hairless and hairy alike across several families, such as Arctiidae, Lasiocampidae, Sphingidae, Saturnidae, and Noctuidae. Before consumption of the caterpillar, the cuckoo removes the gut content. Apart from caterpillars, they eat grasshoppers, large beetles, spiders, stick-insects, crickets, mantids, flies, and ants. Outside of the insectivore diet, they have also been found to feed on certain fruits, pine shoots and needles, and occasionally, eggs that have been removed from other birds' nests and the chicks within them, i.e. Asian Stubtail (Urosphena squameiceps) and the Grey-cheeked Fulvetta (Alcippe morrisonia). The species tends to generally forage arboreally, but has been known to forage on the grounds of forest floors and open areas like grassy landscapes and lawns. They prefer to seek food alone and may even perform short aerial sallies for prey, but small groups will form when the food source is abundant and will remain until the quantity is completely diminished. An extreme case was found during an infestation of teak moths (Hyblaea puera) in New Guinea that caught the attention of at least 300 individuals.

=== Breeding ===
This species of cuckoo, like many others, is a brood parasite where the female lays her eggs in the nests of other bird species. She does this about fifteen times, placing her eggs in separate locations one by one. The host families are usually flycatchers, shrikes or white-eyes. In these new homes, the eggs are incubated and taken care of by the unsuspecting new parents. When the chick is hatched with the others, it is fed insects and larvae alongside the others despite its aggressively different appearance. Sometimes the young cuckoo chick will even push out some, if not all, the other eggs and chicks from the nest if it hatches early. This way, it will get more food from the parents by removing the competition.

The eggs can vary in color and size. Their colors can be pale blue or white with fine black and brown or red stippling, with their sizing ranging from 20- 25mm by 12- 16mm to 19- 22mm by 13- 16mm. There isn't enough recorded information to have a confident measurement of incubation and fledging periods. When nestling, however, they will start off naked with either pale or dark skin, an orange or vermilion mouth and a yellow gape with four triangular black patches.

The breeding occurs during the nesting season of small warblers for this exact purpose, usually during the months of May through June in Kashmir, March through August in Nepal, June through July in central Russia, early May to late June in Japan, and May in Fujian.

The list of brooding hosts include:

Small warblers of genus Phylloscopus

Western crowned leaf-warbler (P. occipitalis) recorded in Kashmir

Eastern crowned leaf-warbler (P.coronatus) recorded in Russia

Lanceolated warbler (Locustella lanceolata)

Tree pipit (Anthus trivialis)

Black-throated accentor (Prunella atrogularis)

Daurian redstart (Phoenicurus auroeus) recorded in Korea

Japanese paradise-flycatcher (Terpsiphone atrocaudata) recorded in Korea

Japanese Bush-wabler (Horornis diphone) recorded in Japan

Asian stubtail (Urosphena squameiceps)

Narcissus flaycatcher (Ficedula narcissina)

Slaty-backed forktail (Enricurus schistaceus) recorded in China

Collared finchbill (Spizixos semitorques)

Brownish-flanked bush-Warbler (Horornis fortipes)

Phylloscopus reguloides

Yellow-throated bunting (Emberiza elegans)

Prinia flaviventris is the only recorded host to date in Taiwan

Phylloscopus coronatus nest in China was recently recorded of having two cuckoo eggs, but it is unknown if they were laid by the same female since one egg is typically laid per nest.

== Conservation ==
Cuculus saturatus is considered least concern as it is not globally threatened. Naturally, the population numbers depend on how well the forest habitats are maintained. It is a very common local species and is quite dispersed in the Himalayas. The species has also been recorded as a common inhabitor of the mountains in Borneo in equal numbers with C.lepidus. It even has an estimated European population of 5,000 to 10,000 breeding pairs. There is little other geographical data available since it is a rare visitor of Malaysia's lowlands in the winter and is suspected to be a passage migrant throughout Thailand, Indochina, the Philippines and Solomons.

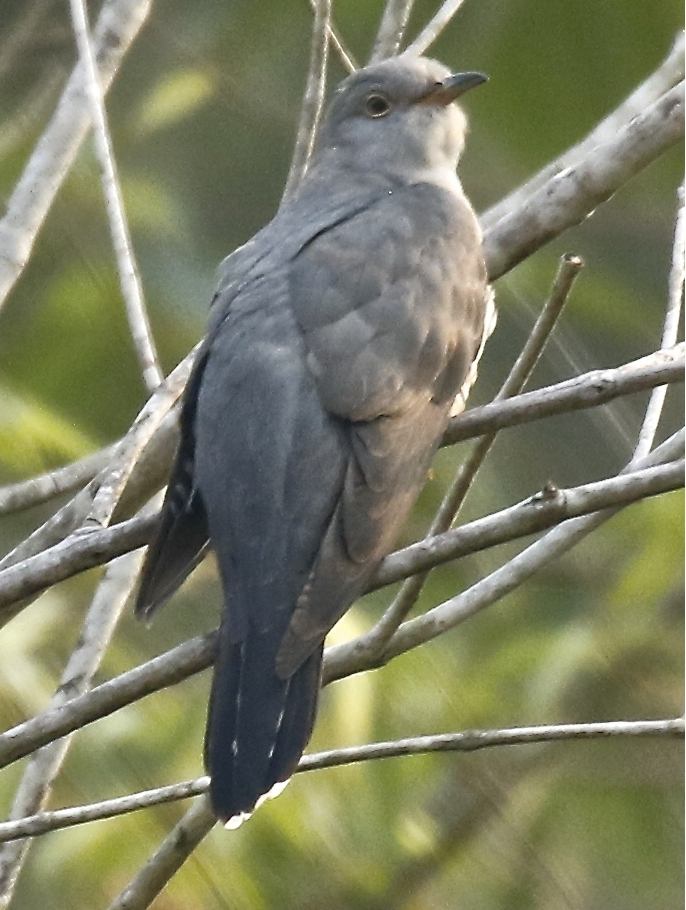
Himalayan Cuckoo - Kaeng Krachen Nat'l Park - Thailand
