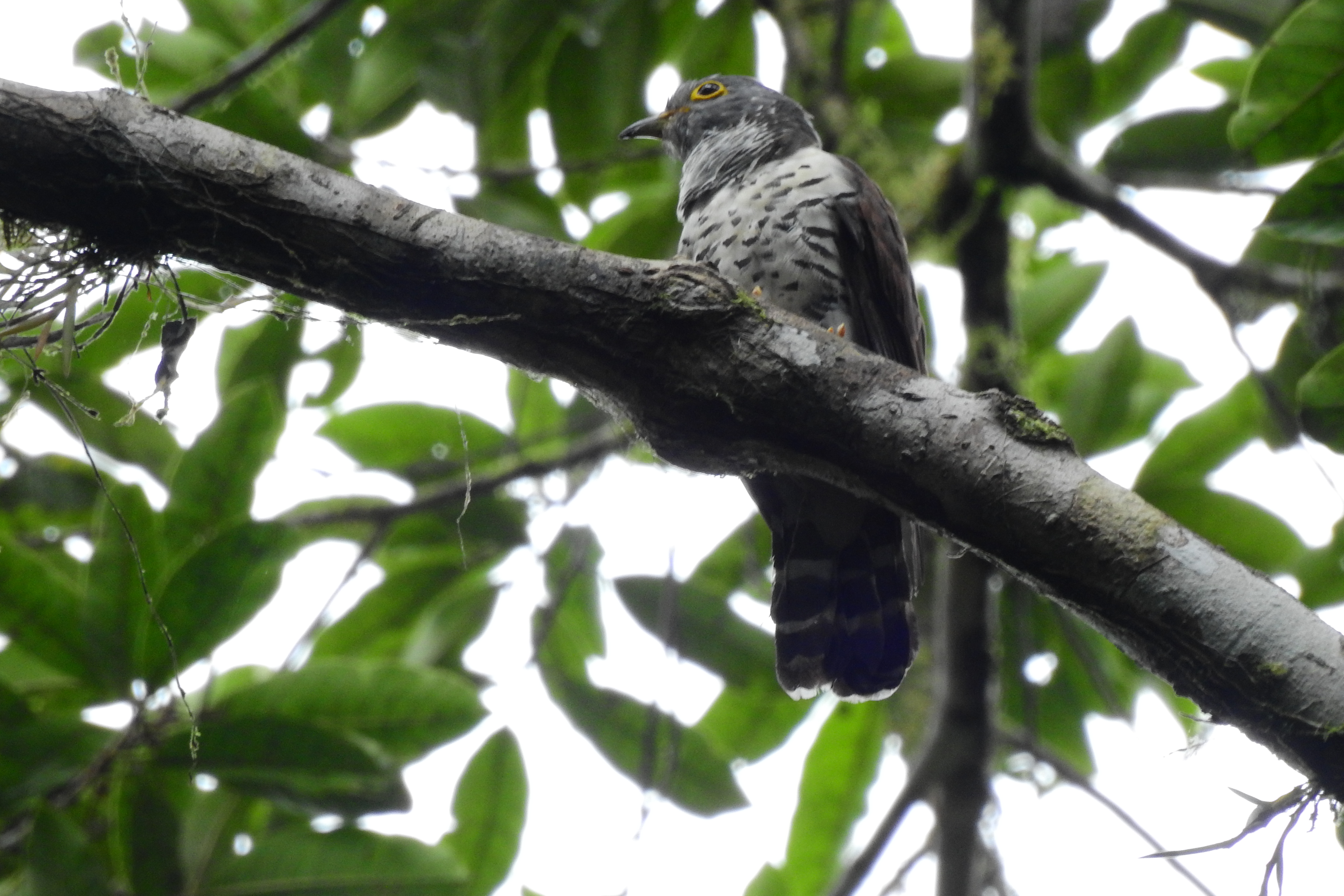
- Adult Sulawesi cuckoo

Conservation status
- Least Concern (IUCN 3.1)

Scientific classification
- Kingdom: Animalia
- Phylum: Chordata
- Class: Aves
- Order: Cuculiformes
- Family: Cuculidae
- Genus: Cuculus
- Species: C. crassirostris

Binomial name
- Cuculus crassirostris (Walden, 1872)

Synonyms
- Hierococcyx crassirostris

= Sulawesi cuckoo =

Species of bird

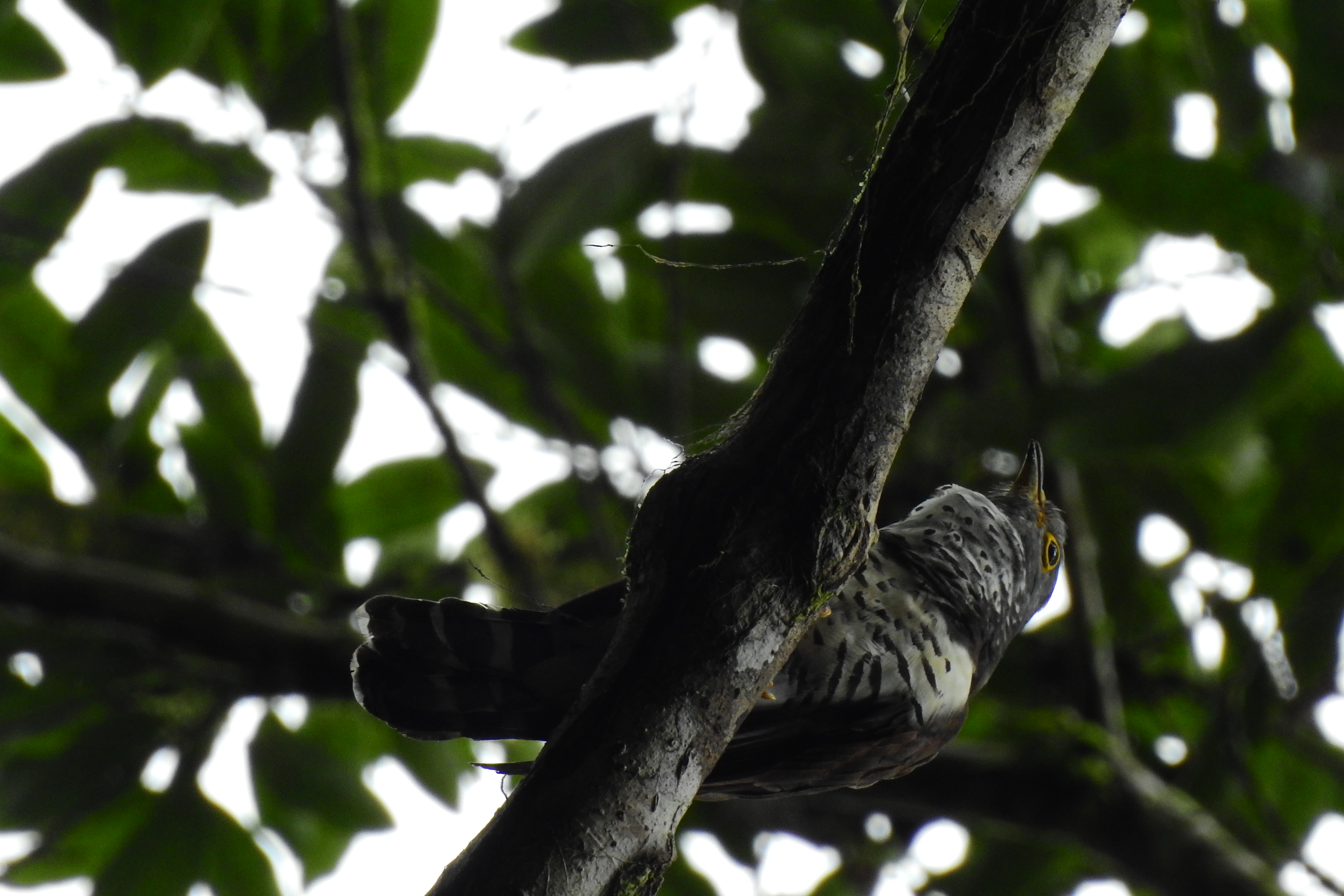

Sulawesi Cuckoo

The Sulawesi cuckoo (Cuculus crassirostris) is a species of cuckoo in the family Cuculidae. It is often known as the Sulawesi hawk-cuckoo but appears not to be related to the other hawk-cuckoos. It is endemic to Sulawesi Island in Indonesia. Its natural habitat is subtropical or tropical moist montane forests.
