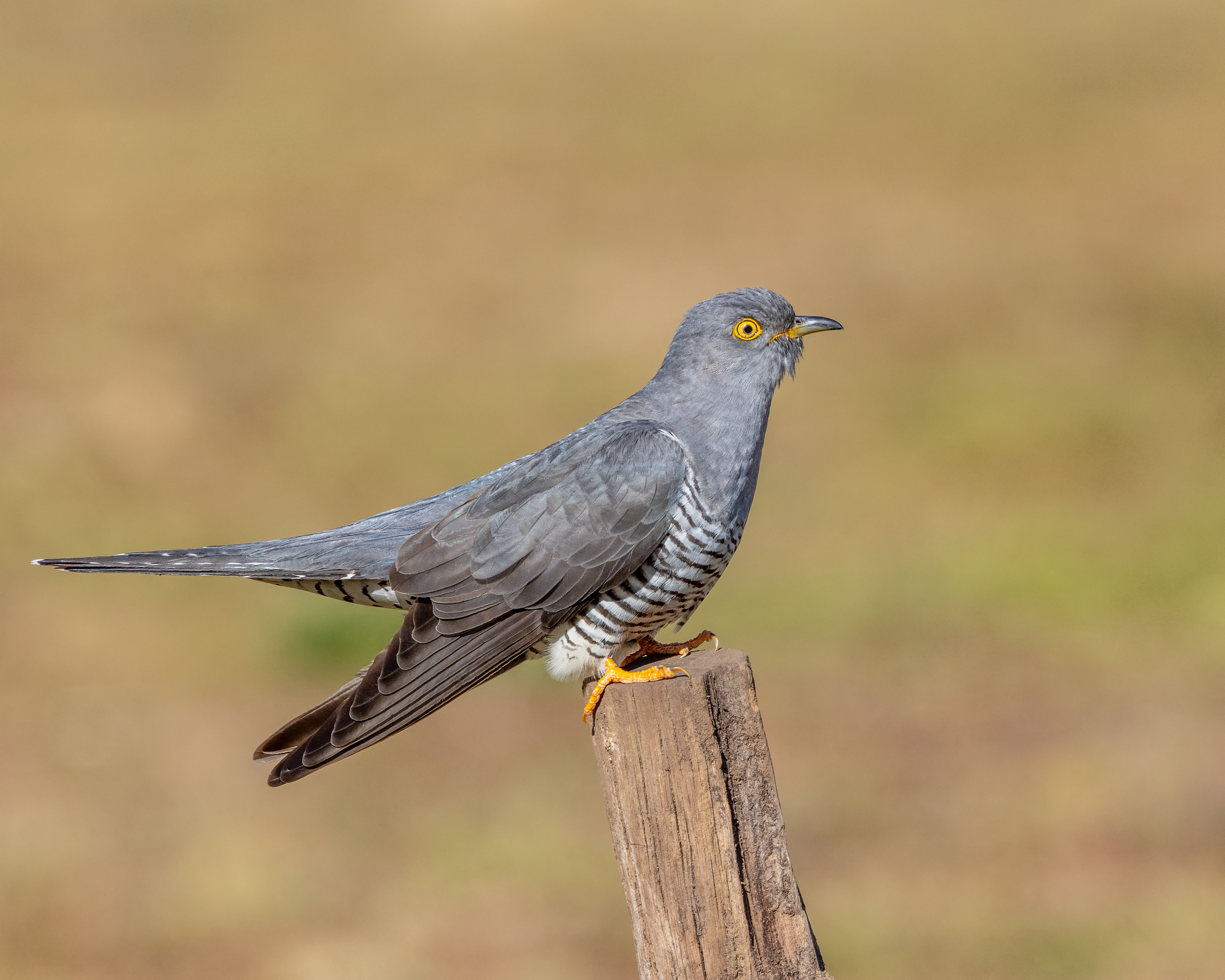
- Common cuckoo (Cuculus canorus)

Scientific classification
- Kingdom: Animalia
- Phylum: Chordata
- Class: Aves
- Order: Cuculiformes
- Family: Cuculidae
- Genus: Cuculus; Linnaeus, 1758

Type species
- Cuculus canorus (common cuckoo) Linnaeus, 1758

Species
- 11, see text

= Cuculus =

Genus of birds

Cuculus is a genus of cuckoos which has representatives in most of the Old World, although the greatest diversity is in tropical southern and southeastern Asia.

== Taxonomy ==
The genus Cuculus was introduced in 1758 by the Swedish naturalist Carl Linnaeus in the tenth edition of his Systema Naturae. The genus name is the Latin word for "cuckoo". The type species is the common cuckoo (Cuculus canorus).

=== Species ===
The genus contains 11 species:

Image	Scientific name	Common name	Distribution
	Cuculus clamsons	Black cuckoo	Sub-Saharan Africa
	Cuculus solitarius	Red-chested cuckoo	Sub-Saharan Africa
	Cuculus poliocephalus	Lesser cuckoo	East Asia and Himalayas; winters to East Africa and Sri Lanka
	Cuculus crassirostris	Sulawesi cuckoo	Sulawesi
	Cuculus micropterus	Indian cuckoo	Indian subcontinent and Southeast Asia.
	Cuculus rochii	Madagascar cuckoo	Madagascar; winters to eastern Africa
	Cuculus gularis	African cuckoo	Sub-Saharan Africa
	Cuculus saturatus	Himalayan cuckoo	southern Himalayas to southern China and Taiwan; winters to Indonesia
	Cuculus optatus	Oriental cuckoo	northern Asia; winters to Southeast Asia
	Cuculus lepidus	Sunda cuckoo	Malesia
	Cuculus canorus	Common cuckoo	Eurasia; winters to sub-Saharan Africa and Indochina

Some sources also include the pallid cuckoo in this genus, although there is disagreement about appropriate classification.

The hawk-cuckoos are now placed in a separate genus, Hierococcyx, while the pallid cuckoo belongs in Cacomantis.

These birds are of variable size with slender bodies, long tails and strong legs. Most occur in open forests, but some prefer more open country. Several species are migratory.

These are vocal species, with persistent and loud calls. They feed on large insects, with hairy caterpillars, which are distasteful to many birds, being a speciality. One or two species will also take some fruit.

Cuculus cuckoos are brood parasites, that is, they lay a single egg in the nests of various passerine hosts. The best-known example is the European common cuckoo. The female cuckoo in each case replaces one of the host's eggs with one of her own. The cuckoo egg hatches earlier than the host's, and the chick grows faster; in most cases the cuckoo chick evicts the eggs or young of the host species.

Cuculus species lay coloured eggs to match those of their passerine hosts. Female cuckoos specialise in a particular host species (generally the species that raised them) and lay eggs that closely resemble the eggs of that host.

A species may consist of several gentes, with each gens specialising in a particular host. There is some evidence that the gentes are genetically different from one another though other authorities state that as female cuckoos mate with males of any gens, genes flow between gentes.
