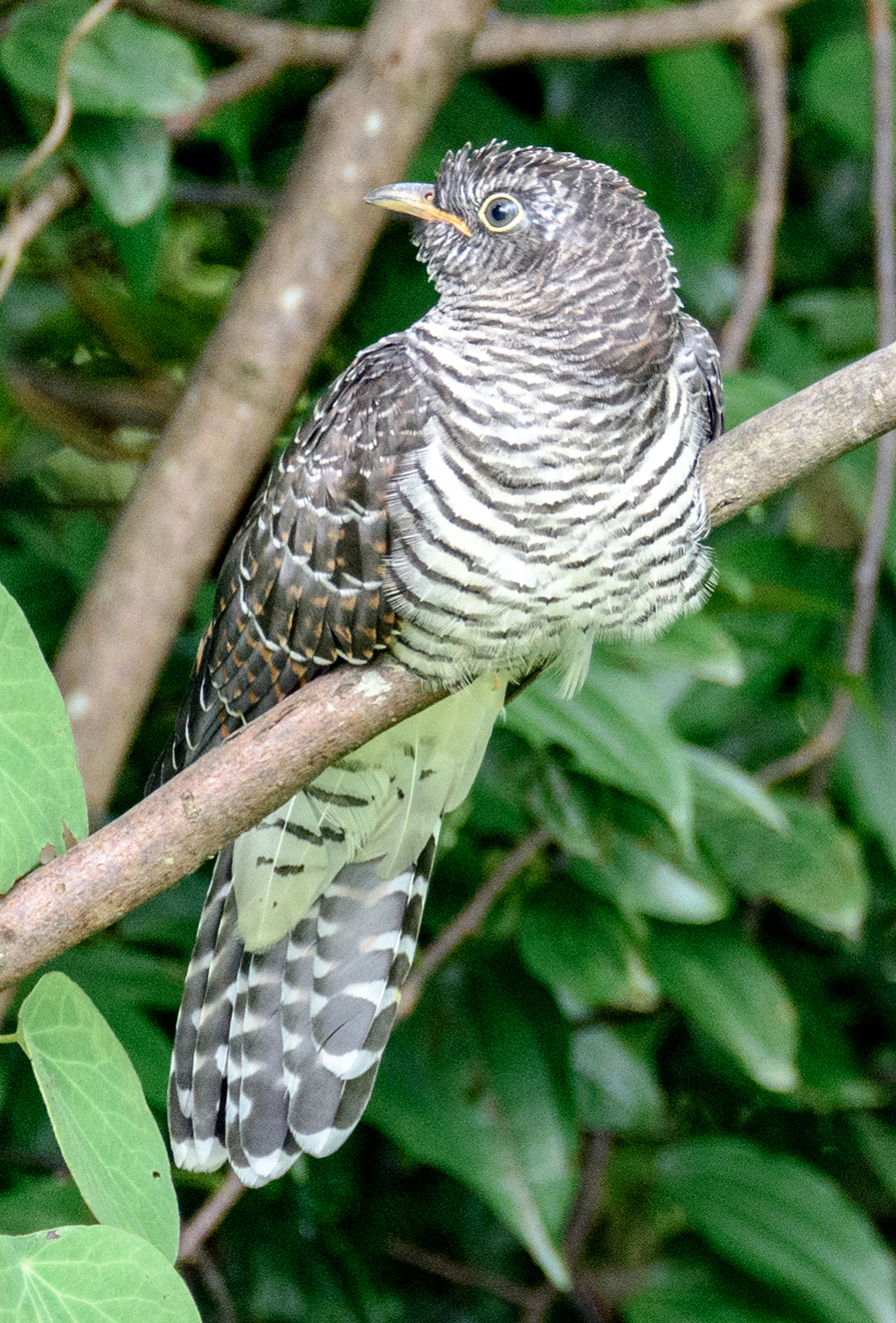
- Indian cuckoo, Nepal

Conservation status
- Least Concern (IUCN 3.1)

Scientific classification
- Kingdom: Animalia
- Phylum: Chordata
- Class: Aves
- Order: Cuculiformes
- Family: Cuculidae
- Genus: Cuculus
- Species: C. micropterus

Binomial name
- Cuculus micropterus Gould, 1838

= Indian cuckoo =

Species of bird

The Indian cuckoo or short-winged cuckoo (Cuculus micropterus) is a member of the cuckoo order of birds, the Cuculiformes, that is found in the Indian subcontinent and Southeast Asia. It ranges from India, Bangladesh, Bhutan, Nepal and Sri Lanka east to Indonesia and north to China and Russia. It is a solitary and shy bird, found in forests and open woodland at up to 3,600 m (11,800 ft).

== Description ==
This is a medium-sized cuckoo with both sexes alike. It has grey upperparts while the underside has broad black barring. The tail is barred with a broad subterminal dark band and a white tip. Young birds have white markings on the crown and white chin and throat contrasting with a dark face. Juveniles are browner and have broad white tips to the head and wing feathers. The eye-ring is gray to yellow (a feature shared with the common hawk-cuckoo). The iris is light brown to reddish. The female differs from the male in being slightly paler grey on the throat and in having more brown on the breast and tail. The barring on the belly is narrower than in the male. Nestlings have an orange-red mouth and yellow flanges to the gape.

Indian cuckoo call
Call of Indian cuckoo recorded at Nagerhole, April 2006

The call is loud with four notes. They have been transcribed as "orange-pekoe", "bo-ko-ta-ko", "crossword puzzle" or "one more bottle". In northern India, they can be locally common during the breeding season with densities estimated at a calling bird for every 2 km^{2} (0.77 sq mi).

They feed on hairy caterpillars and other insects but sometimes take fruits. They usually feed on the upper canopy, gleaning insects, sometimes making aerial sallies for flying termites or rarely even by hovering lower near the ground.

== Taxonomy and systematics ==
Two subspecies are generally recognized. The nominate form is found in much of continental Asia, while concretus S. Müller, 1845 which is smaller and darker is known from the Malay Peninsula, Java, Sumatra and Borneo. The birds in the Amur region are larger and Swinhoe described a form from northern China as Cuculus michieanus while Walter Norman Koelz described a form fatidicus from northeastern India.

== Distribution and habitat ==
The species is found widely distributed across Asia, from the Indian subcontinent eastwards to Southeast Asia. The preferred habitat is deciduous and evergreen forests but also occur in garden lands and thick scrub.

Some populations in India migrate south in winter, although there are breeding populations in the southern areas as well, with specimens netted at night or recorded at lighthouses. The population in the Amurland of Russia is migratory.

== Behaviour and ecology ==
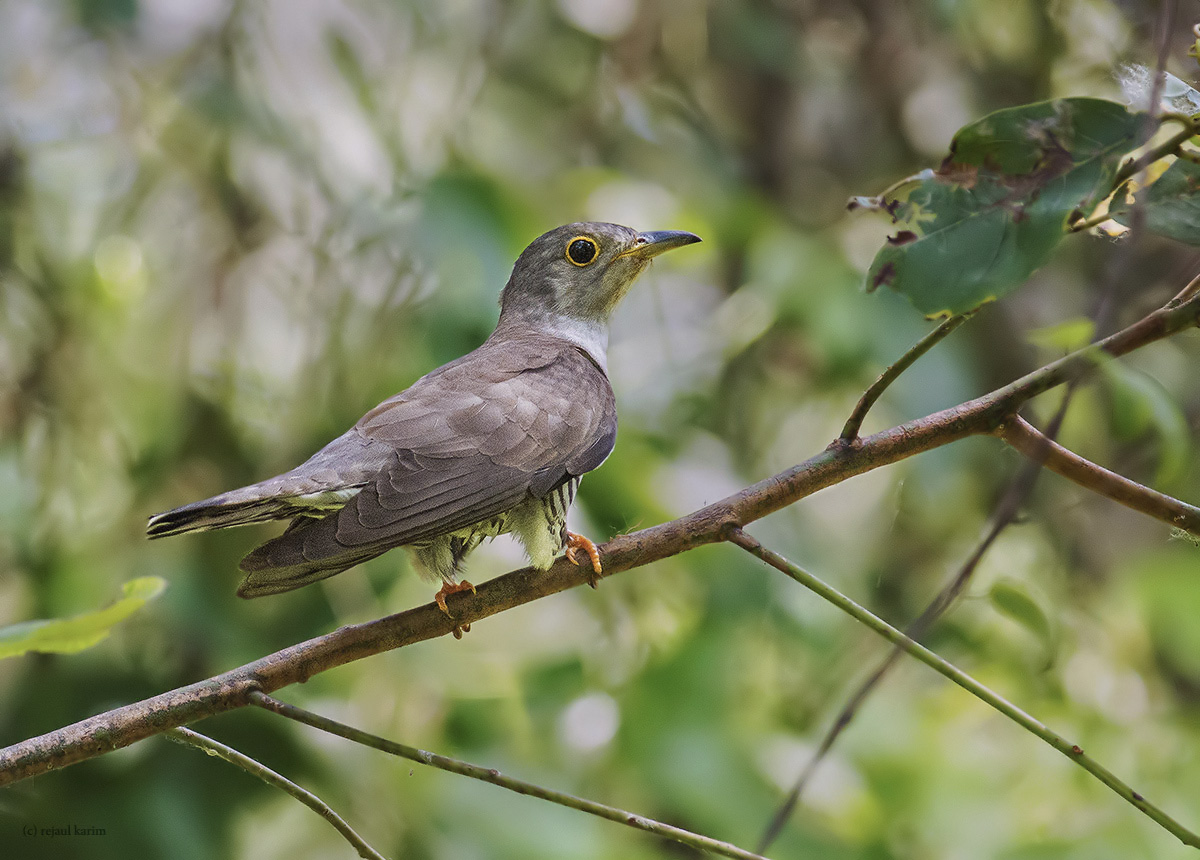
Indian Cuckoo from Barpeta, Assam

The Indian cuckoo is a brood parasite. In Russia, females were found to pair with specific males during the breeding season. The male diverts the attention of hosts from their nest giving time for the female to lay her egg. It lays its single egg mostly in the nests of drongos and crows. Brown shrikes have been recorded as hosts in Russia. The female removes and eats an egg from the host nest before laying her own. The breeding season varies from May to July in northern China, March to August in India, January to June in Burma and January to August in the Malay Peninsula.

The host species include Lanius cristatus in the Amur region, black drongo and Pica cyanea in China. In India, they have been found to be fed by black drongos and ashy drongo. Other hosts that have been recorded include black-headed oriole, streaked spiderhunter, Eurylaimus ochromalus and Dicrurus paradiseus.

The eggs of the cuckoo hatch in 12 days while those of the brown shrike in the Amur region take 15 days. During the third or fourth day, the young bird bends its back when touched and heaves out other eggs or nestlings. This instinct is lost soon after.

== In culture ==
The loud calls have led to numerous cultural interpretations. In Bengali, it is interpreted as "বউ কথা কও (bou-kôtha-kôo)", "Wife, please speak". In Uttarakhand and Nepal, it is rendered as "kafal pako", or "the kafal fruit (Myrica esculenta) is ripe", as is the case in May–June when calling increases. It is known as "Vishupakshi" in Malayalam and its call is interpreted as "Kallan chakkayittu", meaning "thief stole jackfruit". Very little variation is noted between regions. In the Kangra Valley of India, the call is interpreted as the soul of the dead shepherd uttering "where is my sheep". In China, the call is variously interpreted as "why not go home" (不如歸去), "single lonely" (光棍好苦), "single happy" (光棍好過), "mother-in-law beats me" (家婆打我), "catfish congee" (滑哥煲粥), "myna of pea" (豌豆八哥), "pea and maize corn" (豌豆包谷), "go to cut wheat" (快快割麥), "Grandpa, Grandma, cut wheat, transplant rice" (阿公阿婆，割麦插禾). The Soliga people use the interpretation "ke:ta satto, makka ketto " which translate to "Ketha (a person's name) died, his sons cried". In Vietnamese, the call is interpreted as "bắt cô trói cột" (literally meaning: "take a woman and tie her to a post") stemming from a legend possibly originating from the Mảng ethnic group.

== Other sources ==
- Sankar, K (1993) The Indian Cuckoo (Cuculus micropterus micropterus Gould) in Sariska Tiger Reserve, Rajasthan. J. Bombay Nat. Hist. Soc. 90(3):512.
- Hewetson, C. E. (1956) Observations on the bird life of Madhya Pradesh. J. Bombay nat. Hist. Soc. 53(4):627.
