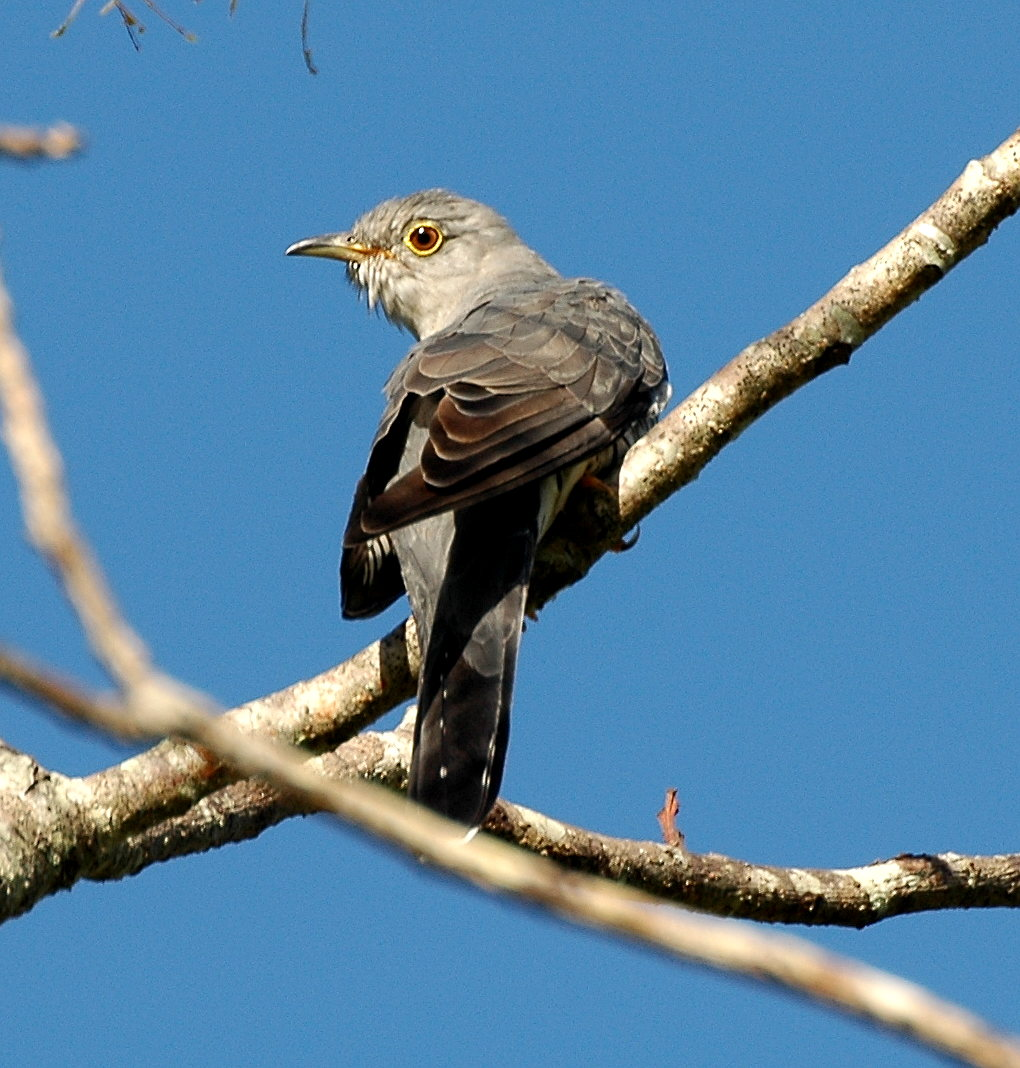

Conservation status
- Least Concern (IUCN 3.1)

Scientific classification
- Kingdom: Animalia
- Phylum: Chordata
- Class: Aves
- Order: Cuculiformes
- Family: Cuculidae
- Genus: Cuculus
- Species: C. optatus

Binomial name
- Cuculus optatus Gould, 1845

Synonyms
- Cuculus horsfieldi

= Oriental cuckoo =

Species of bird

The Oriental cuckoo or Horsfield's cuckoo (Cuculus optatus) is a bird belonging to the genus Cuculus in the cuckoo family Cuculidae. It was formerly classified as a subspecies of the Himalayan cuckoo (C. saturatus), with the name 'Oriental cuckoo' used for the combined species. Differences in voice and size suggest that it should be treated as a separate species. The binomial name Cuculus horsfieldi has often been used instead of Cuculus optatus, but is now usually considered to be a junior synonym.

== Description ==
It is 30–32 centimetres long with a wingspan of 51–57 centimetres and a weight of 73–156 grams. The adult male has a grey head, breast and upperparts. The belly is creamy-white with dark bars. The vent is frequently buff with few markings. The legs and feet are orange-yellow and there is a bare yellow ring around the eye. Adult females and juveniles occur in two morphs. The grey morph is similar to the male but has a brownish wash on the breast. The rufous morph is reddish-brown above, paler on the underparts and with strong dark bands all over including the rump.

The common cuckoo (C. canorus) is very similar in appearance but is slightly bulkier with longer wings and tail and a slightly smaller head and bill. It is slightly paler grey and the barring on the underparts is a little narrower. The vent is usually white with dark bars but is more similar to Oriental cuckoo in a few individuals. Birds of the rufous morph have a plain rump with no dark bars unlike the Oriental cuckoo. Rufous morphs may have evolved to deter male harassment or host species mobbing, and may be ancestral to both common cuckoos and Oriental cuckoos.

The Himalayan cuckoo (C. saturatus) is extremely similar to the Oriental cuckoo but is slightly smaller and shorter-winged.

The call of the male Oriental cuckoo is a series of low paired notes, poo-poo, with both notes stressed equally. It is somewhat similar to the call of the hoopoe. It may be introduced with a four to eight note phrase or sometimes with grating notes. The female's call is a deep bubbling trill. Outside the breeding season, the birds are usually silent. The call of the male Himalayan cuckoo is a series of three or four note phrases with a short, high-pitched introductory note.

== Distribution ==
It has a large breeding range in northern Eurasia. It breeds across much of Russia west to the Komi Republic with occasional records as far west as Saint Petersburg. It also breeds in northern Kazakhstan, Mongolia, northern China, Korea and Japan.

The exact extent of its wintering range is uncertain due to its secretive habits and the difficulty of separating it from the Himalayan cuckoo and other similar species. It is believed to include the Malay Peninsula, Indonesia, the Philippines, New Guinea, western Micronesia, the Solomon Islands and northern and eastern Australia with occasional birds reaching New Zealand. It has occurred as a vagrant in Ukraine, Israel and Alaska.

== Ecology ==
It mainly inhabits forests, occurring in coniferous, deciduous and mixed forest. It feeds mainly on insects and their larvae, foraging for them in trees and bushes as well as on the ground. It is usually secretive and hard to see. It usually arrives later (end of April) to the breeding grounds in southern Russia than sympatric common cuckoo.

It is a brood parasite, laying its eggs in the nests of other birds. The nests of Phylloscopus warblers such as the Arctic warbler, eastern crowned warbler, willow warbler and chiffchaff are commonly used. Other hosts include the olive-backed pipit and Asian stubtail. The eggs are smooth, slightly glossy and vary in colour, sometimes mimicking those of the host species. They are incubated for about 12 days. The young cuckoo is born naked and has an orange gape with black patches. Within a few days it pushes the eggs or young of the host out of the nest. Older nestlings have blackish feathers with white fringes; the belly is dark brown with white bands. The young birds fledge after around 17–19 days.

== Gallery ==
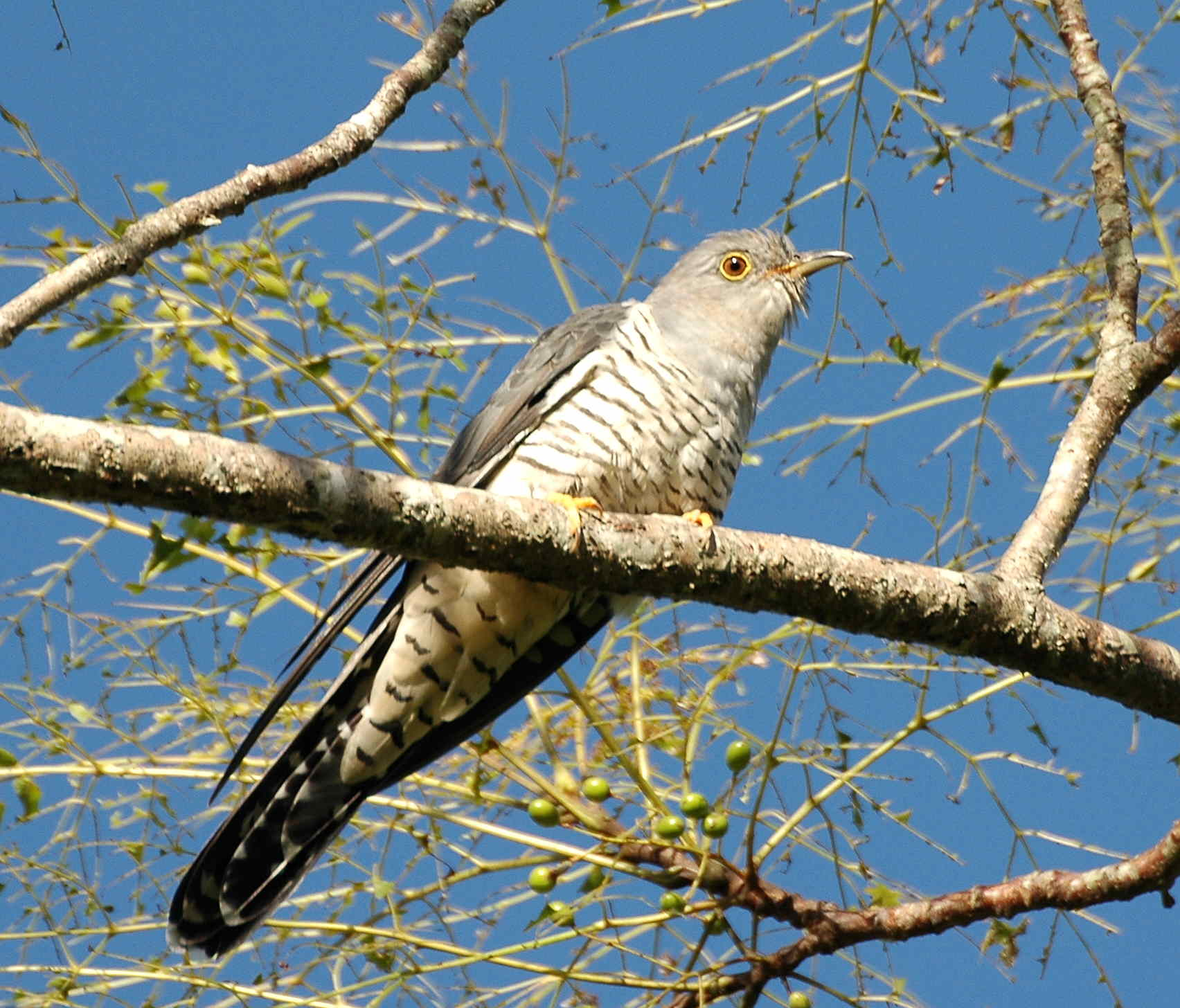
Photographed at Maiala NP, SE Queensland, Australia

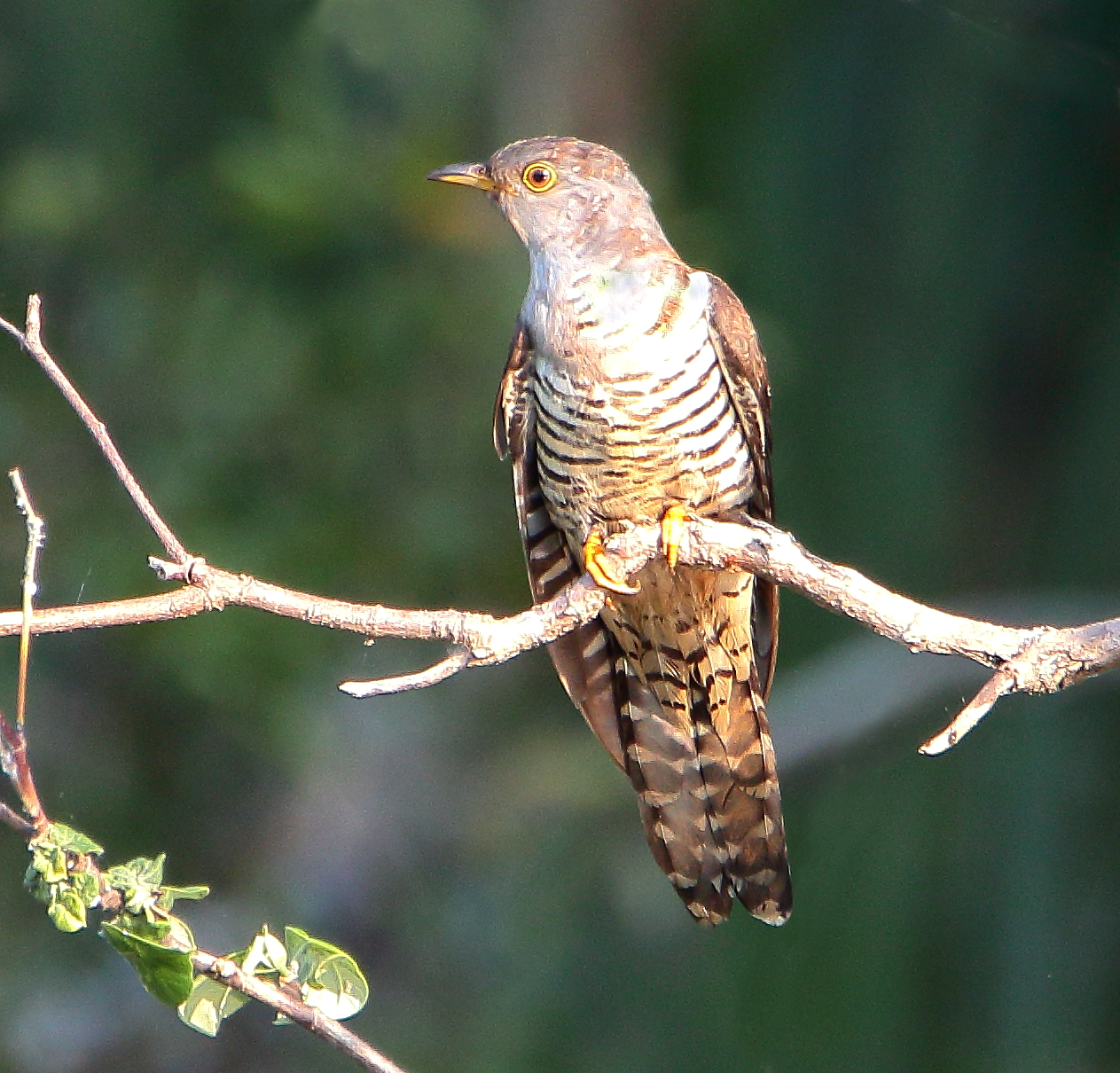
Oriental cuckoo in Cairns, Queensland, Australia
