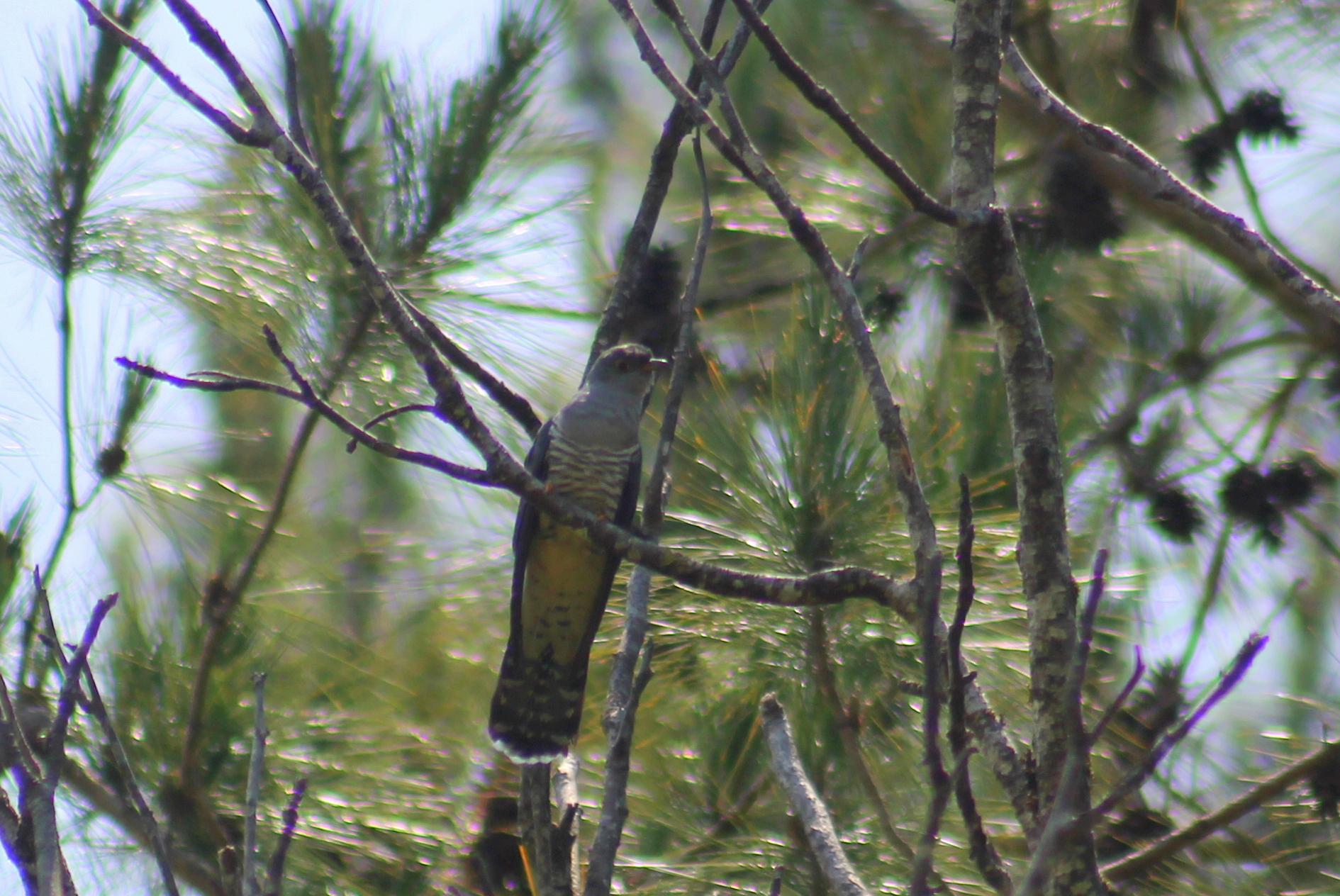

Conservation status
- Least Concern (IUCN 3.1)

Scientific classification
- Kingdom: Animalia
- Phylum: Chordata
- Class: Aves
- Order: Cuculiformes
- Family: Cuculidae
- Genus: Cuculus
- Species: C. rochii

Binomial name
- Cuculus rochii Hartlaub, 1863

= Madagascar cuckoo =

Species of bird

The Madagascar cuckoo or Madagascan cuckoo (Cuculus rochii), also known as the Madagascar lesser cuckoo, is a species of cuckoo in the family Cuculidae. Though it breeds only in Madagascar, it winters to eastern Africa (from the African Great Lakes region to Zanzibar).

== Description ==
The Madagascar cuckoo is a small, slim cuckoo, measuring 28 cm (11 in) in length.
