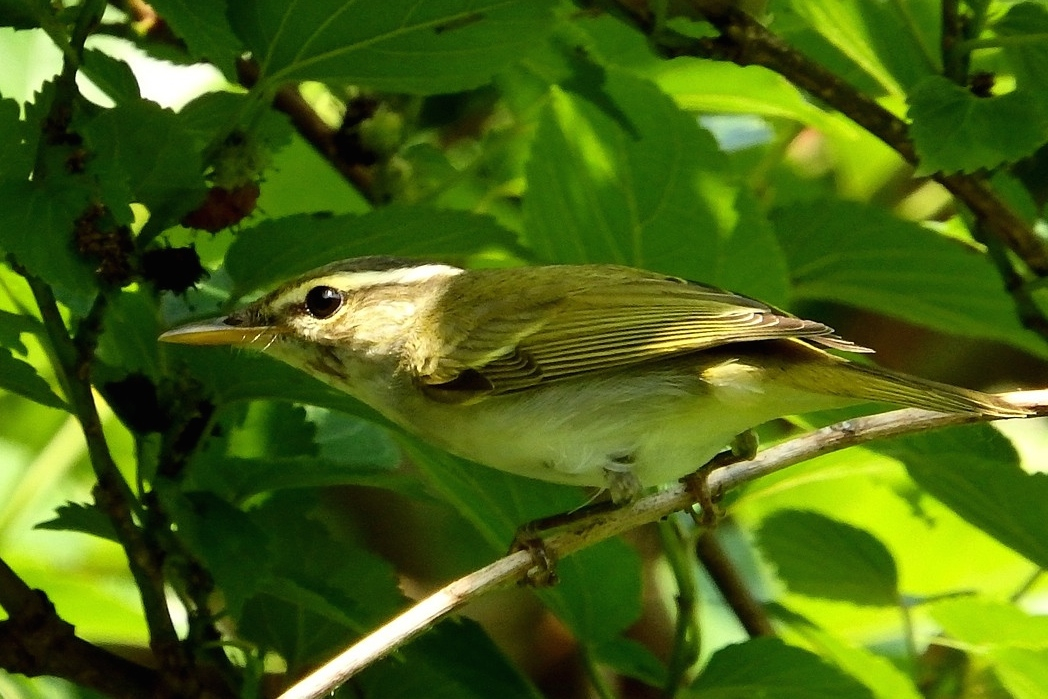
- Taipei

Conservation status
- Least Concern (IUCN 3.1)

Scientific classification
- Kingdom: Animalia
- Phylum: Chordata
- Class: Aves
- Order: Passeriformes
- Family: Phylloscopidae
- Genus: Phylloscopus
- Species: P. coronatus

Binomial name
- Phylloscopus coronatus (Temminck & Schlegel, 1845)
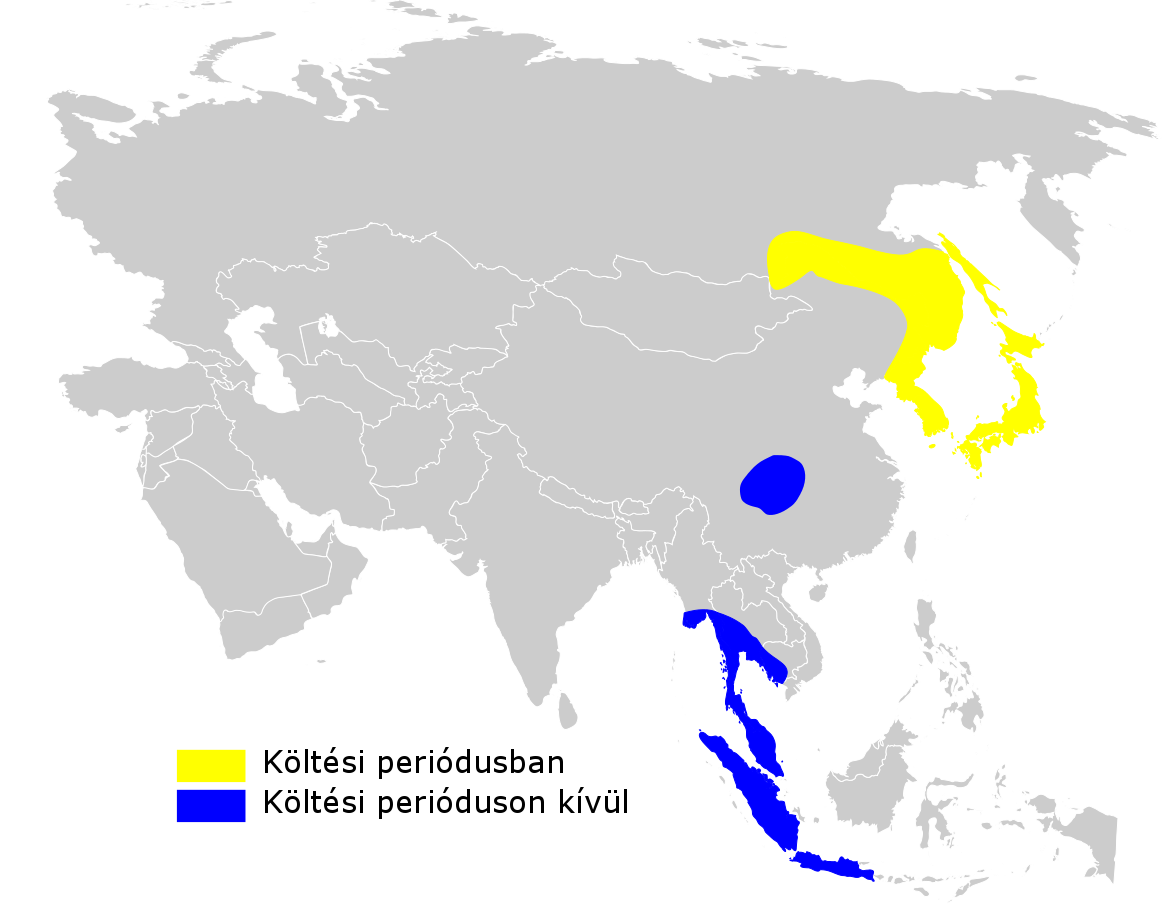
- The range of eastern crowned warbler Breeding Non-breeding

Synonyms
- Ficedula coronata Temminck & Schlegel, 1847

= Eastern crowned warbler =

Species of bird

The eastern crowned warbler (Phylloscopus coronatus) is a species of Old World warbler in the family Phylloscopidae. It inhabits boreal and temperate forests in the east Palearctic.

== Description ==
The eastern crowned warbler is a medium-sized, rather robust and brightly coloured leaf warbler. It is dark olive-green above and white below with a strong head pattern of dark, grey lateral crown stripes with an indistinct yellowish median crown stripe. It also has a long yellowish-white supercilium with a dark stripe through the eye and dark lores and dusky yellow cheeks. It has a single pale wingbar. The square tail shows a slight fork. It has quite a strong, robust, pale-coloured bill and dark legs.

== Distribution ==
The eastern crowned warbler breeds in eastern Siberia from the Argun River eastwards and southwards into western Manchuria and into central Sichuan, the Korean Peninsula and Japan. It winters in south-east Asia from eastern India and Bangladesh to Java. It has occurred as a vagrant in western Europe with the first record for Great Britain being in County Durham in 2009; this was the fifth record for the Western Palearctic (UK and Scandinavia).

== Habitat and biology ==
The eastern crowned warbler is found in open woodland, either mixed or deciduous, at the lower and middle altitudes of mountains, although in the northern part of their range they inhabit dense taiga. Wintering birds occur in open woodland, deep jungle and mangroves. This is an arboreal species but it will forage quite low down in vegetation and will join mixed flocks of other small birds in the winter and in the breeding season. The species is often located by its frequent singing. It readily flycatches by sallying out from a perch to catch insects in flight.

== Etymology ==
The genus name Phylloscopus is from Ancient Greek phullon, "leaf", and skopos, "seeker" (from skopeo, "to watch"). The specific coronatus is from Latin and means "crowned".
