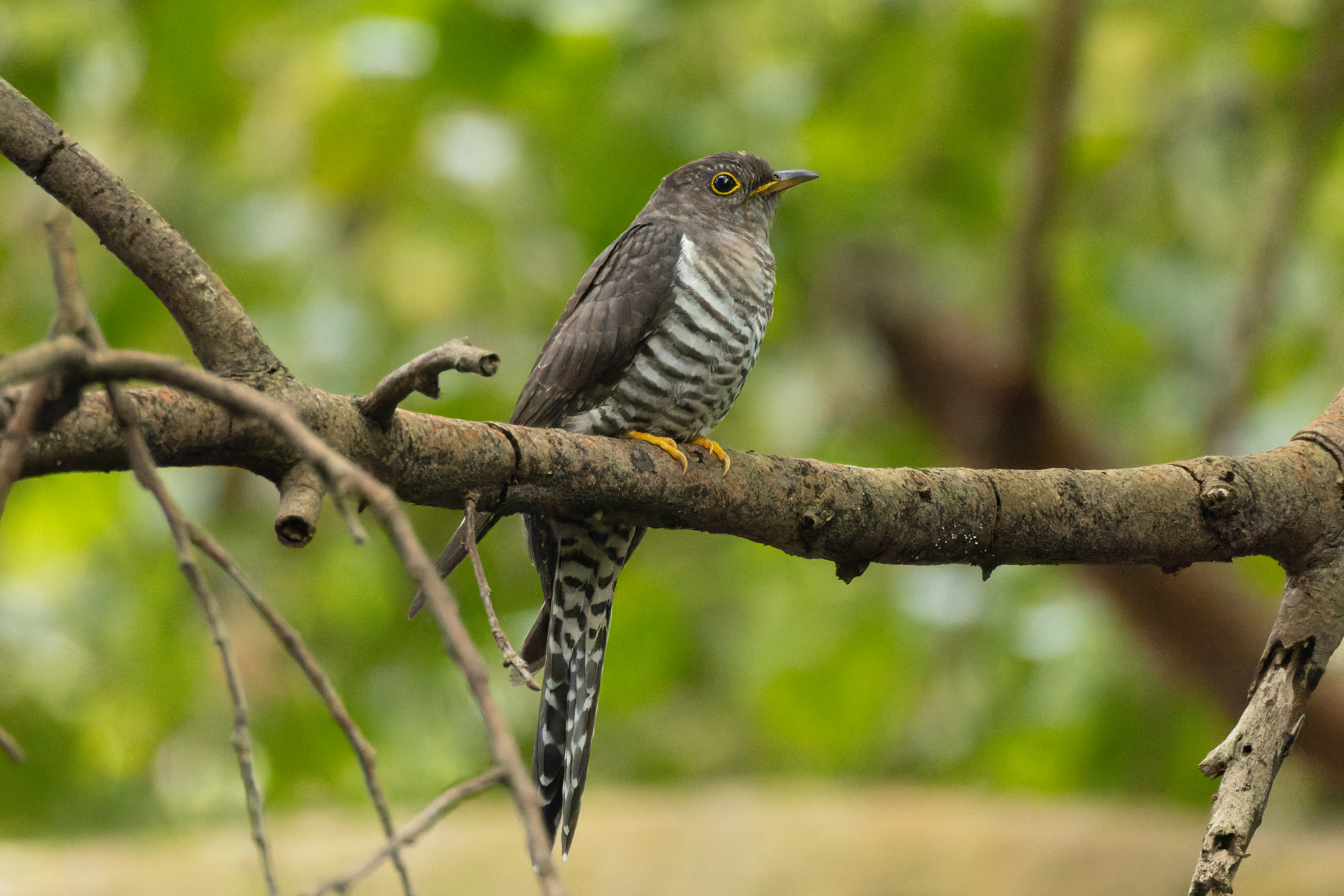

Conservation status
- Least Concern (IUCN 3.1)

Scientific classification
- Kingdom: Animalia
- Phylum: Chordata
- Class: Aves
- Order: Cuculiformes
- Family: Cuculidae
- Genus: Cuculus
- Species: C. poliocephalus

Binomial name
- Cuculus poliocephalus Latham, 1790

Audio
- Song recorded in Japan

= Lesser cuckoo =

Species of bird

The lesser cuckoo (Cuculus poliocephalus) is a species of cuckoo in the family Cuculidae.

It is native to East Asia and the Himalayas; it winters to East Africa and Sri Lanka.

== In culture ==
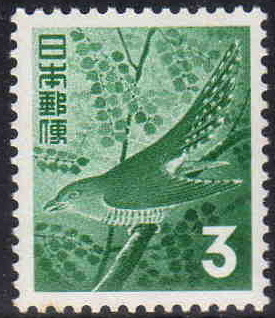
Lesser cuckoo on a 1971 Japanese stamp

In Japan, the bird is called hototogisu (ホトトギス/杜鵑) and frequently praised in senryu for its song.

It has been celebrated by numerous waka poets since the anthology Kokin wakashū (920). Sei Shōnagon in her essay The Pillow Book (1002) mentions a trip she and other courtiers mounted on just to hear this bird, and it was expected of them that they would compose poetry on the occasion. It is also the central image in poem 81 by Tokudaiji Sanesada in the anthology of 100 poems, the Hyakunin Isshu.

The Japanese haiku magazine Hototogisu takes its name from the bird, and the magazine's mastermind Masaoka Shiki's adopted pen name, Shiki (子規) also refers to the lesser cuckoo; shiki corresponds to the Chinese zǐguī (子規), which is an alias for its standard name dùjuān (杜鵑).

In Chinese, dùjuān is a generic name and the species' common name is xiāodùjuān (小杜鵑).

In Korean literature, the song of the lesser cuckoo represents the sound of sadness.
