= Neora Valley National Park =

National park in the state of West Bengal, India

- IUCN category II (national park)
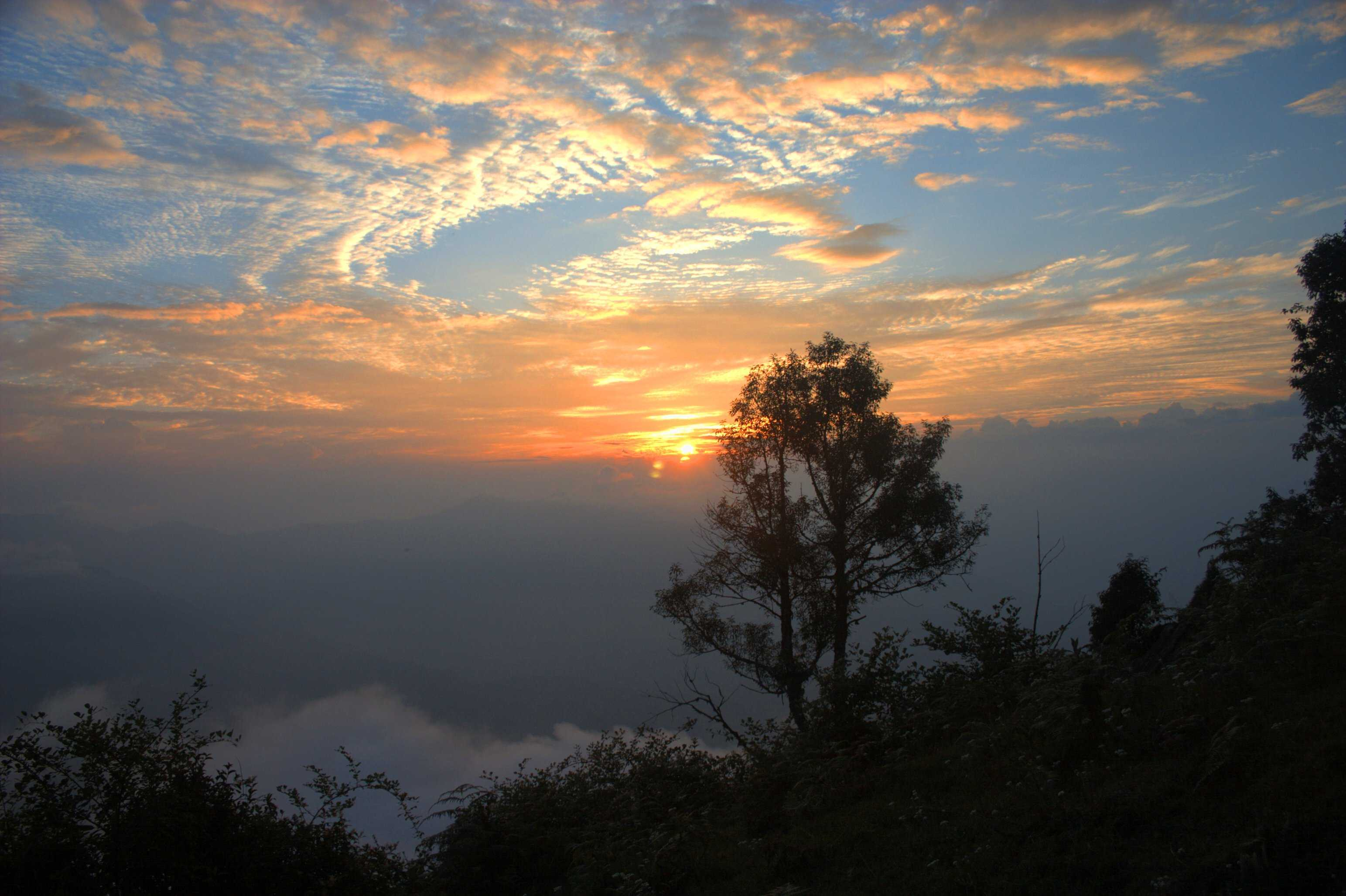
- A view of Neora Valley National Park

- Location within West Bengal Location within India
- Interactive map of Neora Valley National Park
- Location: Kalimpong district, West Bengal, India
- Nearest city: Kalimpong
- Coordinates: 27°04′N 88°42′E
- Area: 88 km^{2} (34 sq mi)
- Established: 1986
- Governing body: Government of India, Government of West Bengal

Neora Valley National Park is a national park in Kalimpong district, West Bengal, India that was established in 1986. Spread over an area of 88 km^{2} (34 sq mi), it is a rich biological zone in eastern India. It is the land of the red panda in the pristine undisturbed natural habitat with rugged inaccessible hilly terrain and rich diverse flora and fauna. It is linked to Pangolakha Wildlife Sanctuary of Pakyong District as well as forests of Samtse District, Bhutan via thick cover of forests.

== Geography ==
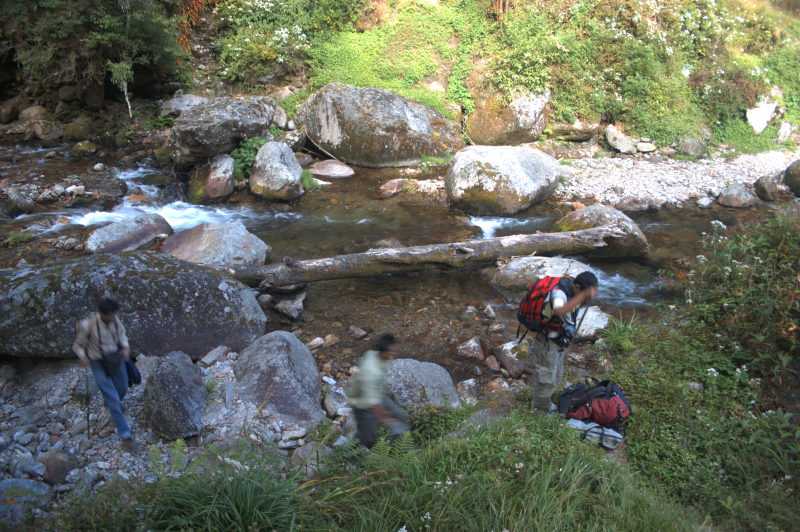
Neora River, West Bengal

Neora Valley National Park covers an area of 88 km^{2} (34 sq mi) with an elevation of 183–3,200 m (600–10,499 ft). The highest point is Rachela Danda. Much of the park is still inaccessible. It borders Pakyong District and Samtse Bhutan. The Neora River is the major water source for Kalimpong town.

== Biodiversity ==
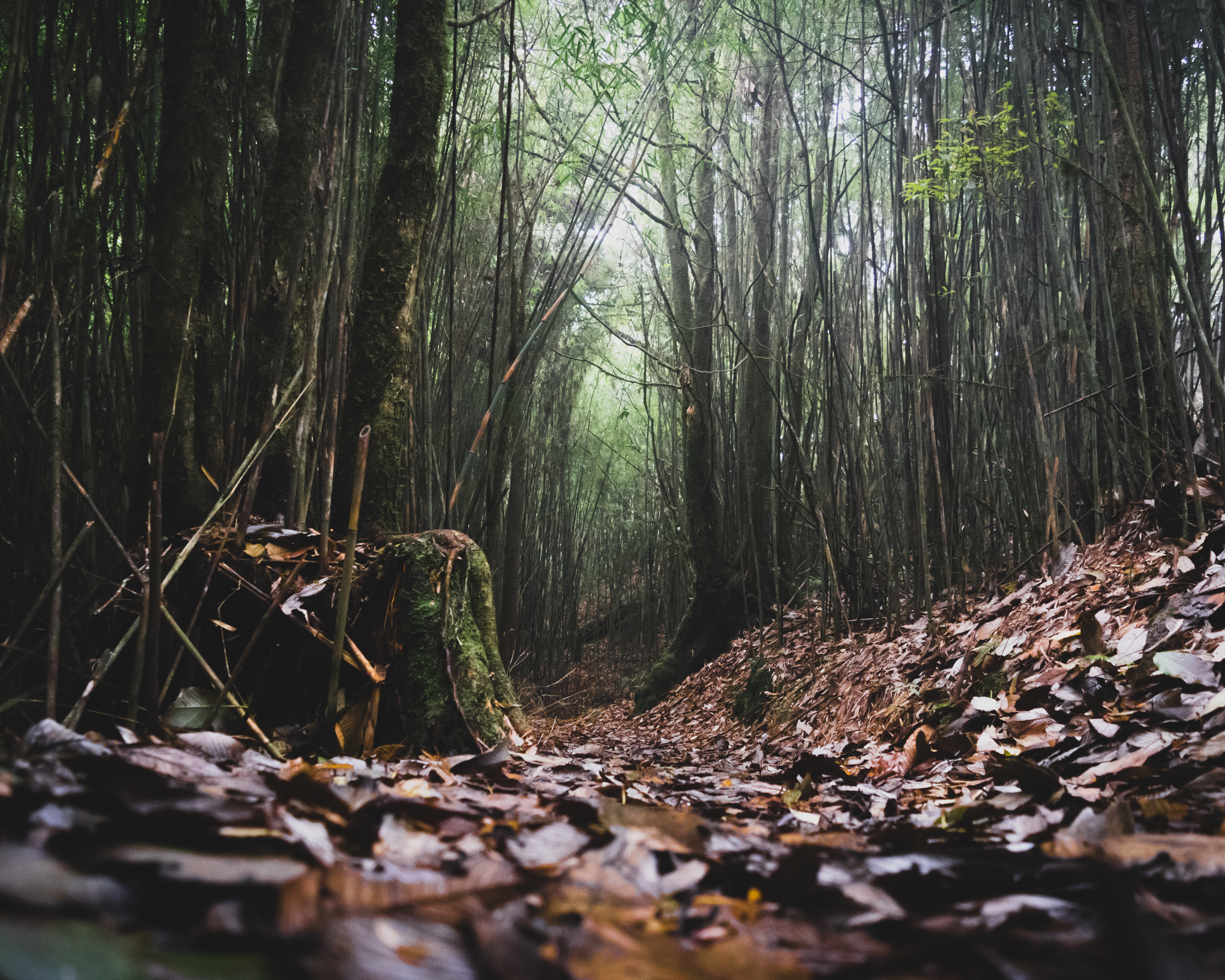
A stream in Neora Valley National Park

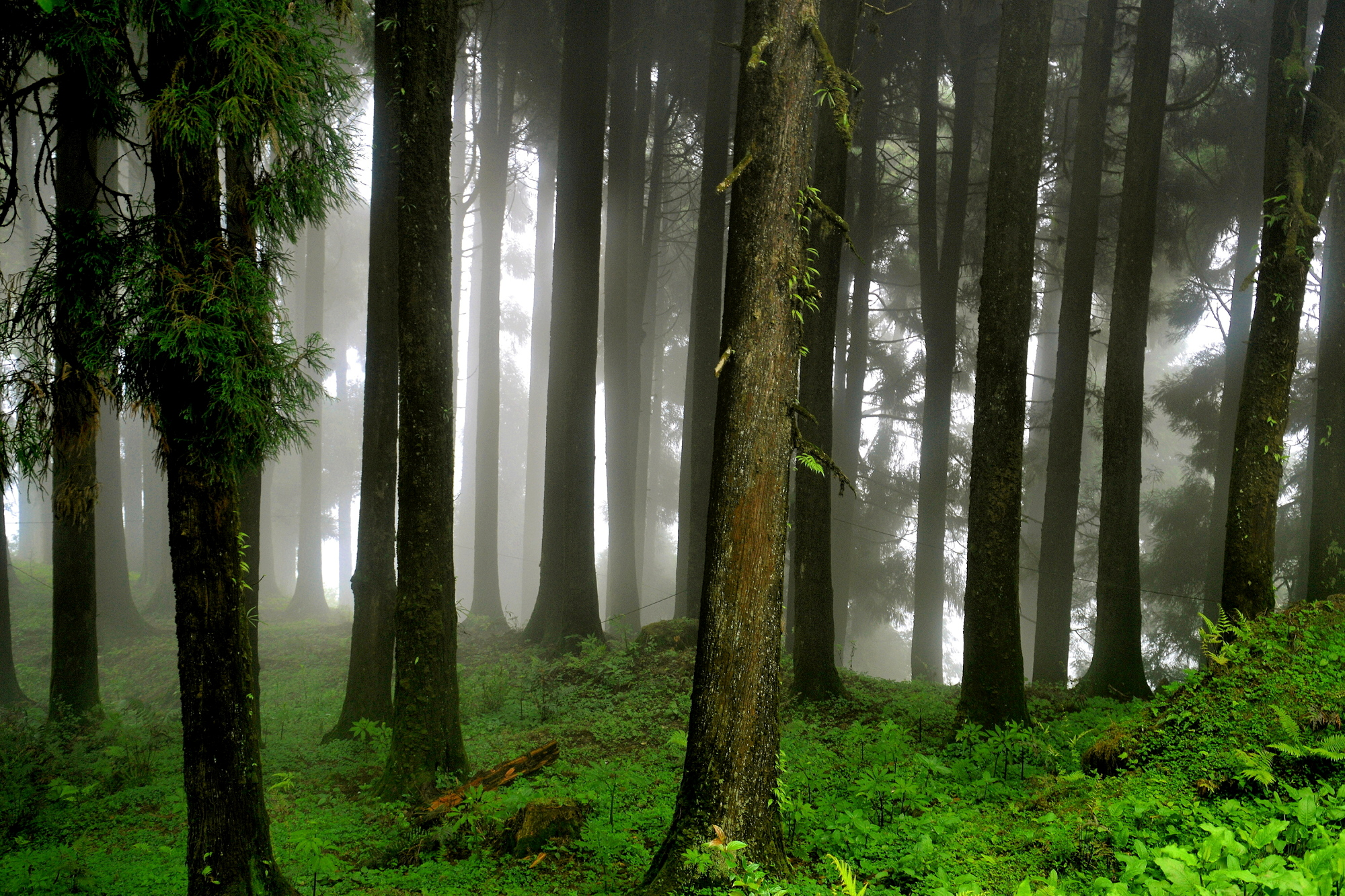
Forest in Neora Valley National Park

Avian fauna listed from this park are of A1, A2 and A3 categories with IBA site code IN-WB-06.

The primary biomes inside Neora Vally National Park are:

- Sino-Himalayan Temperate Forest of the Eastern Himalayan broadleaf forests Biome 7
- Sino-Himalayan Subtropical Forest of the Himalayan subtropical broadleaf forests Biome 8
- Indo-Chinese Tropical Moist Forest of the Himalayan subtropical pine forests Biome 9

=== Flora ===
Neora Valley sustains a unique ecosystem where tropical, sub-tropical, sub-temperate, and temperate vegetative system still harbours a wealth of flora and fauna. The forests consists of mixed species like rhododendron, bamboo, oak, ferns, sal, etc. The valley also has numerous species of orchids, some of which are endemic to the park. Common species of rhododendron that grow in the park include Rhododendron arboreum, Rhododendron falconeri, and Rhododendron dalhousiae.

=== Fauna ===
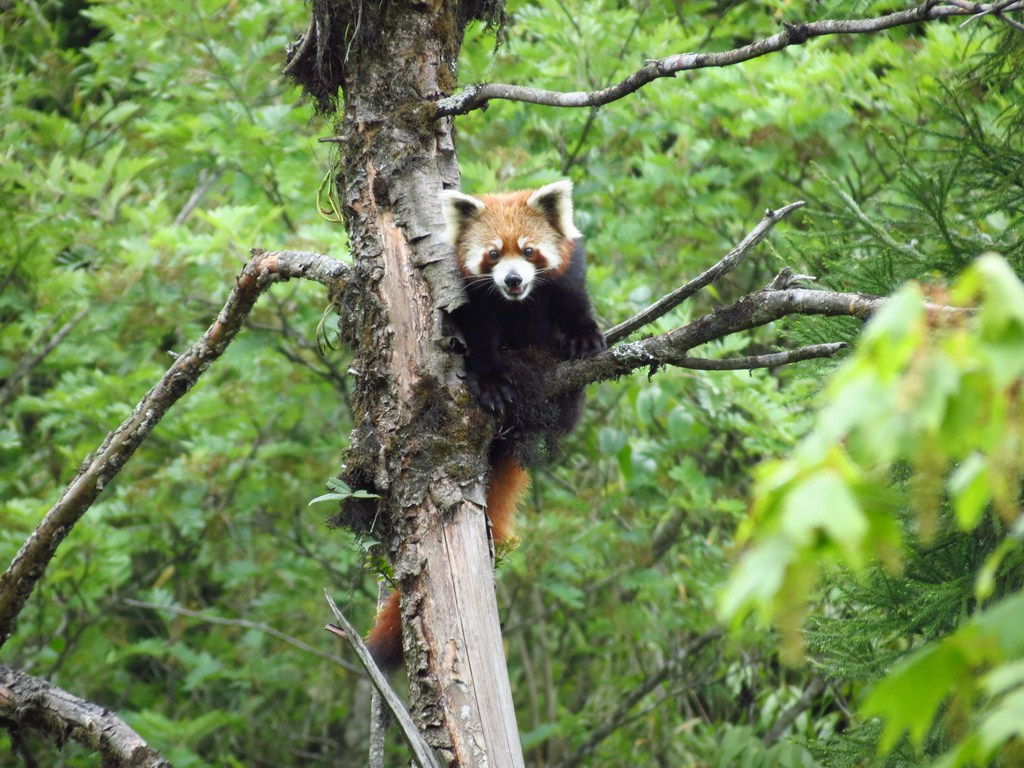
Red panda

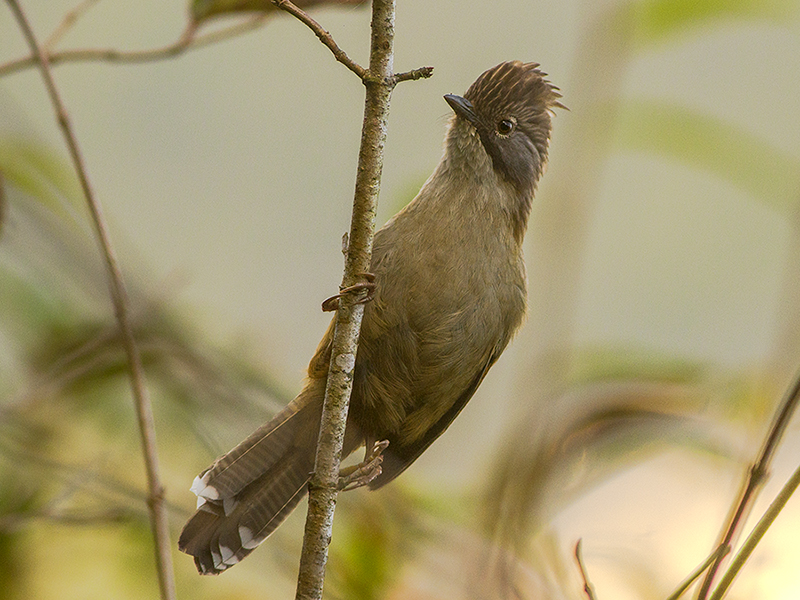
Hoary-throated barwing (Actinodura nipalensis)

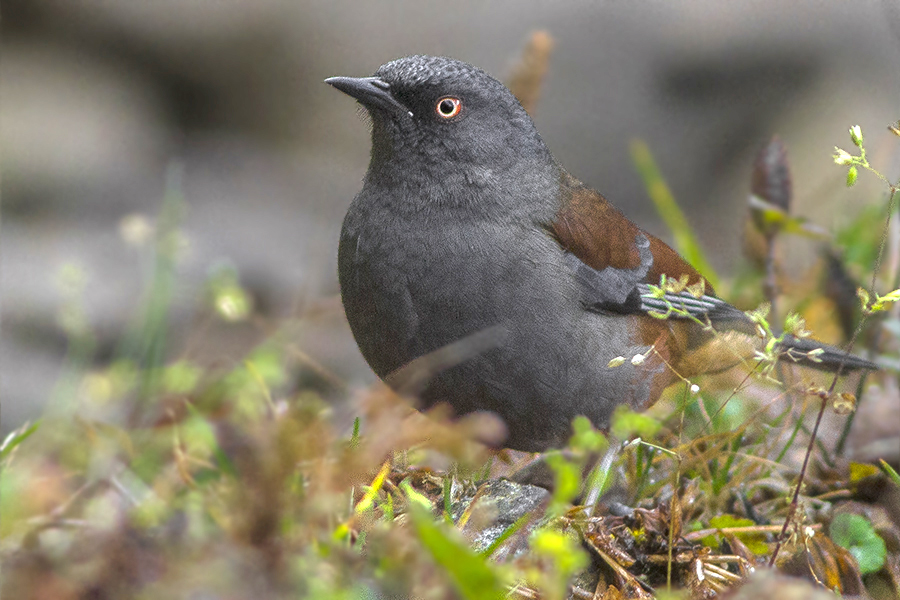
Maroon-backed accentor (Prunella immaculata)

Mammals reported from this area are Indian leopard, five viverrid species, Asiatic black bear, sloth bear, Asian golden cat, wild boar, leopard cat, goral, serow, barking deer, sambar deer, flying squirrel and tahr, red panda, clouded leopard. The semi-evergreen forests between 1,600 and 2,700 m (5,200 and 8,900 ft) host rufous-throated partridge, satyr tragopan, crimson-breasted woodpecker, Darjeeling woodpecker, bay woodpecker, golden-throated barbet, Hodgson's hawk cuckoo, lesser cuckoo, brown wood owl, ashy wood pigeon, mountain imperial pigeon, Jerdon's baza, black eagle, mountain hawk eagle, dark-throated thrush, rufous-gorgeted flycatcher, white-gorgeted flycatcher, white-browed bush robin, white-tailed robin, yellow-browed tit, striated bulbul, chestnut-headed tesia, chestnut-crowned warbler, black-faced warbler, black-faced laughingthrush, chestnut-crowned laughingthrush, streak-breasted scimitar babbler, scaly-breasted cupwing, pygmy cupwing, rufous-fronted babbler, black-headed shrike babbler, white-browed shrike-babbler, rusty-fronted barwing, rufous-winged fulvetta, brown parrotbill, fire-breasted flowerpecker, fire-tailed sunbird, maroon-backed accentor, dark-breasted rosefinch, red-headed bullfinch, gold-naped finch.

Reptilian fauna includes King cobra, common krait, green pit viper, blind snake, lizards. Insects include butterflies, moths, beetles, bees, wasps, bugs and cicadas.

== See also ==
- Pangolakha Wildlife Sanctuary
- Gorumara National Park
- Chapramari Wildlife Sanctuary
