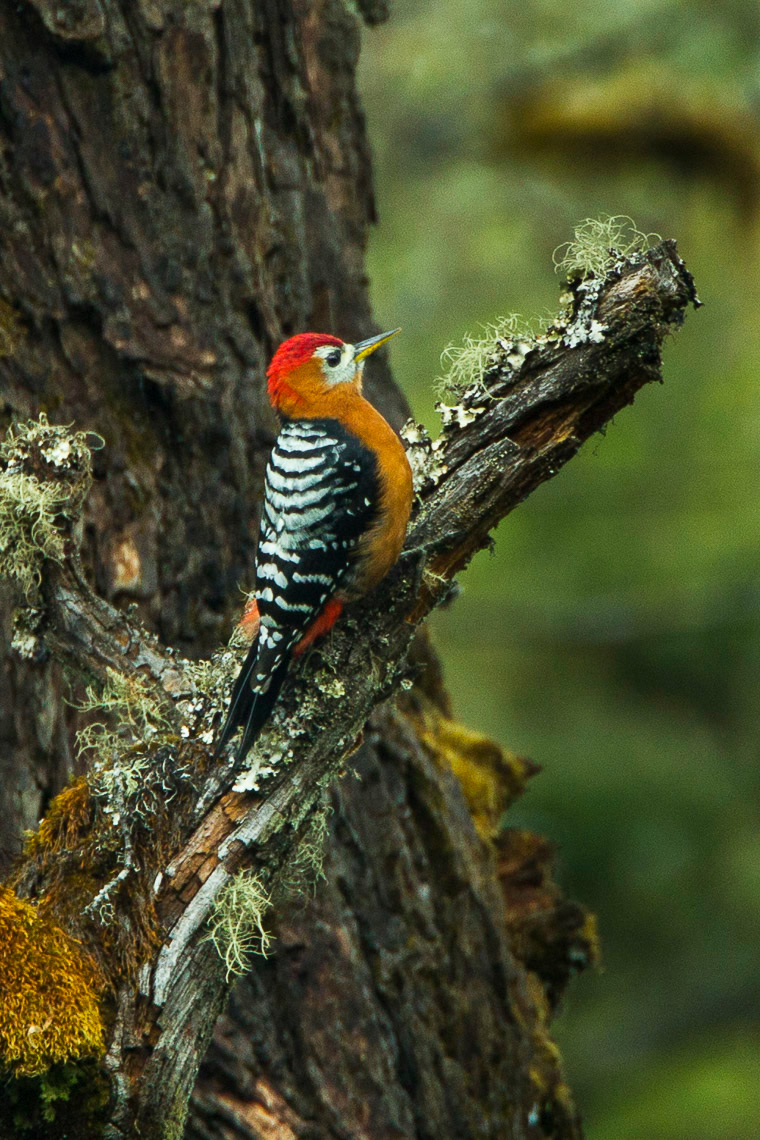
- Male in Bhutan

Conservation status
- Least Concern (IUCN 3.1)

Scientific classification
- Kingdom: Animalia
- Phylum: Chordata
- Class: Aves
- Order: Piciformes
- Family: Picidae
- Genus: Dendrocopos
- Species: D. hyperythrus

Binomial name
- Dendrocopos hyperythrus (Vigors, 1831)

Synonyms
- Hypopicus hyperythrus

= Rufous-bellied woodpecker =

Species of bird

The rufous-bellied woodpecker or rufous-bellied sapsucker (Dendrocopos hyperythrus) is a species of bird in the family Picidae. This woodpecker has a habit of making a series of small pits on the bark of trees leading to its being considered an Asiatic member of the sapsuckers in the past. It is found along the Himalayas in the Indian subcontinent and Southeast Asia, ranging across Bangladesh, Bhutan, Cambodia, Hong Kong, India, Korea, Myanmar, Nepal, Thailand, Manchuria, Ussuriland and Vietnam. Its natural habitats are subtropical or tropical moist lowland forests and subtropical or tropical moist montane forests.

== Description ==
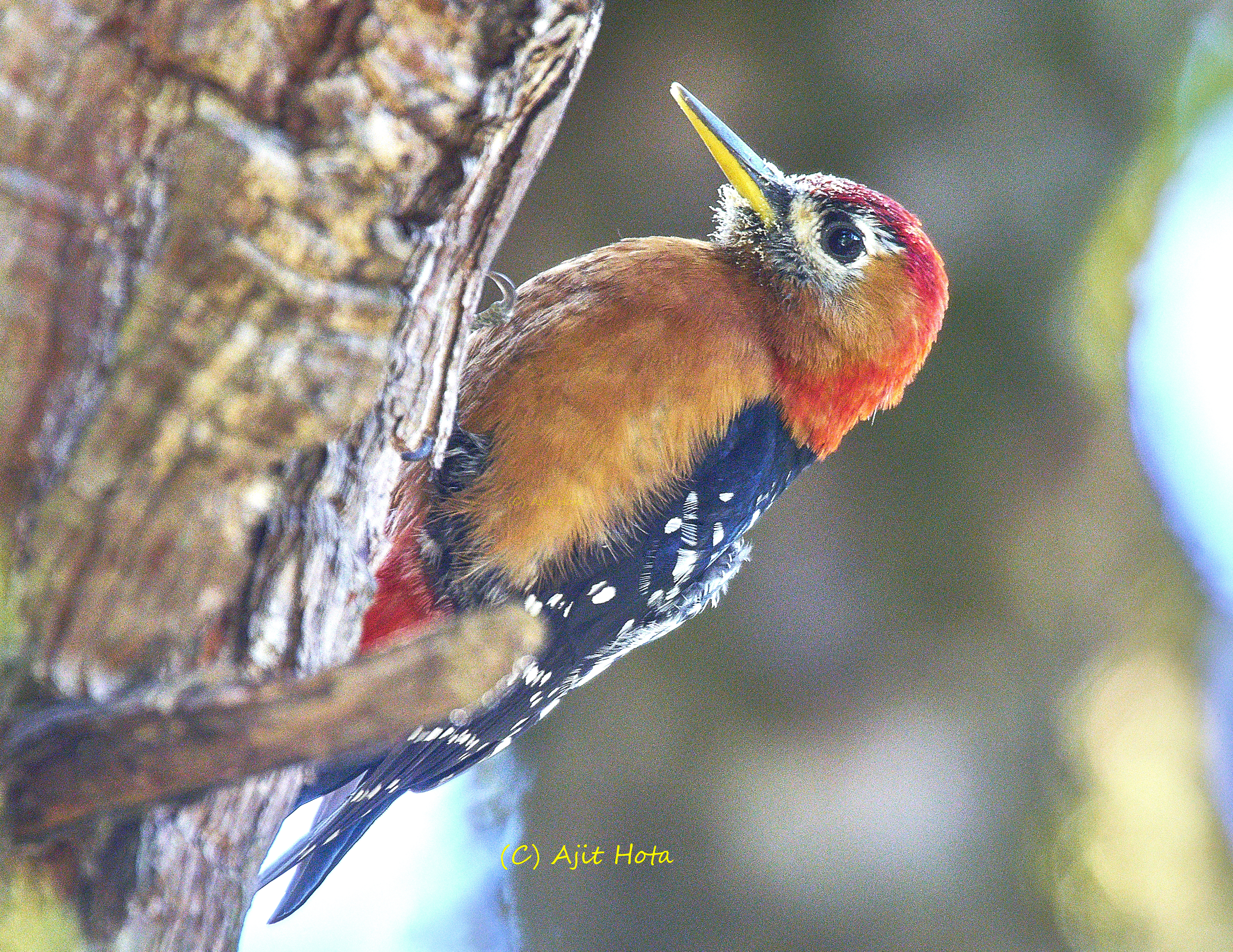
Adult Male at Uttarakhand, India

The rufous-bellied woodpecker ranges in length from about 19 to 23 cm (7.5 to 9.1 in). The male has a red crown while the female has a black crown, speckled with white. Both sexes have a black mantle and back, while the wings are black barred with white. The upper tail is black, with some white barring on the outer two pairs of feathers. The face is white and the throat and underparts are a uniform cinnamon or rufous. The lower belly is black barred with white and the under-tail converts are red or pink. The iris is chestnut, the upper mandible of the beak is black and the lower mandible grey, and the legs are grey or olive.

== Ecology ==
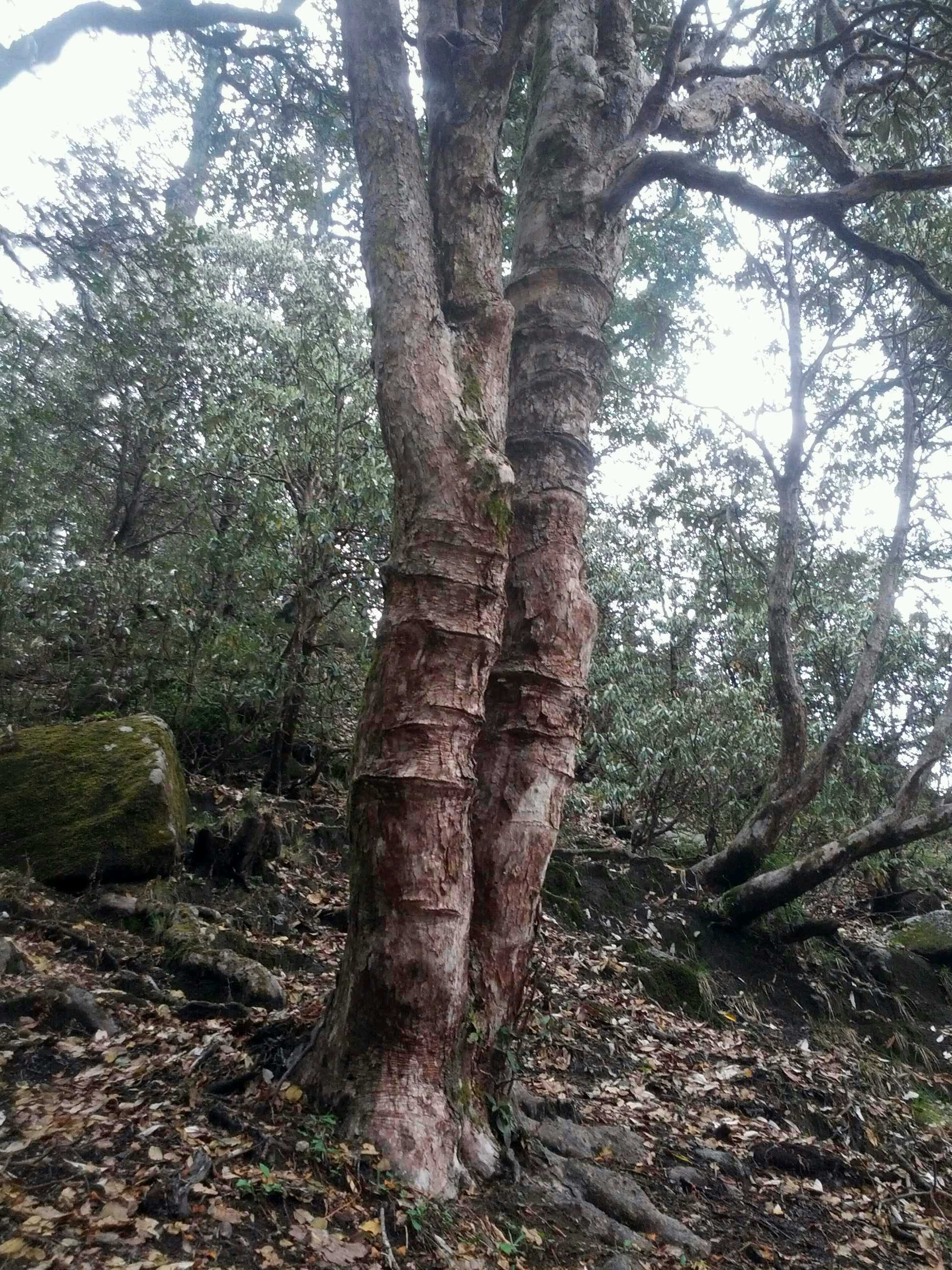
Rings on the trunk of Rhododendron arboreum in the central Himalayas in response to years of tapping by rufous-bellied woodpeckers.

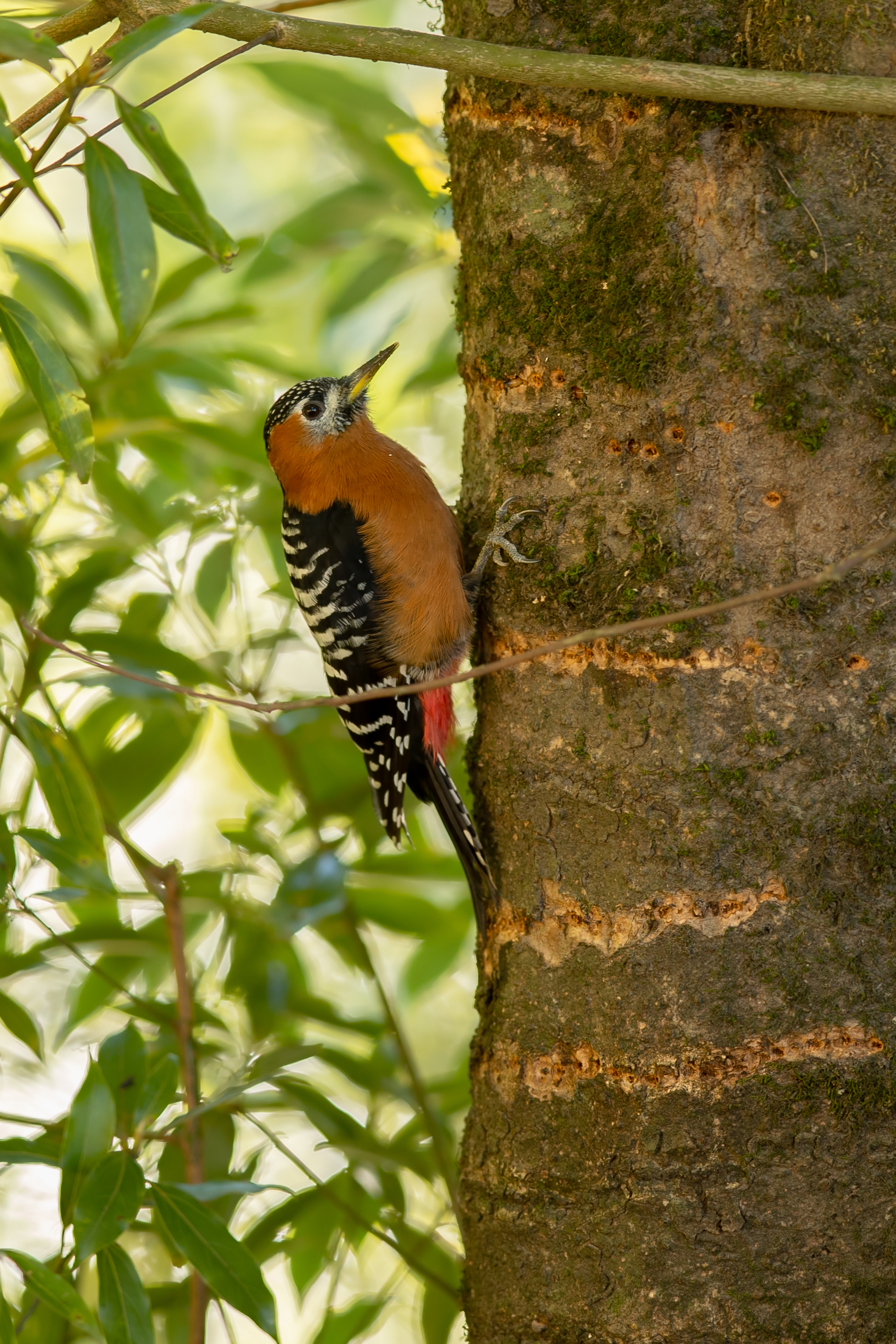
Rufous-bellied woodpecker @ Pangoot, Uttrakhand

It has a tongue that has a brushy tip that allows it to feed on sap. Sap is predominantly sought in the spring season while wood-boring and bark insects are taken at most other times. The trees that they use include Quercus semecarpifolia, Quercus glauca, Betula utilis, Ilex dipyrena and Rhododendrons. The same trees may be used for the extraction of sap from year to year resulting in changes to the tree shape. The sap from the wells made by the woodpecker are also visited by other bird species which include the rufous sibia, white-browed fulvetta, rufous-winged fulvetta, hoary-throated barwing, chestnut-tailed minla, blue-winged minla, several warblers, green-backed tit, yellow-browed tit, white-tailed nuthatch and green-tailed sunbird.

== Status ==
The rufous-bellied woodpecker has a wide range but is generally an uncommon bird. It has disappeared from part of its former range because of the clearing of the deciduous forest necessary for its survival. The population trend is thought to be downwards, but the International Union for Conservation of Nature has assessed its conservation status as being of "least concern".
