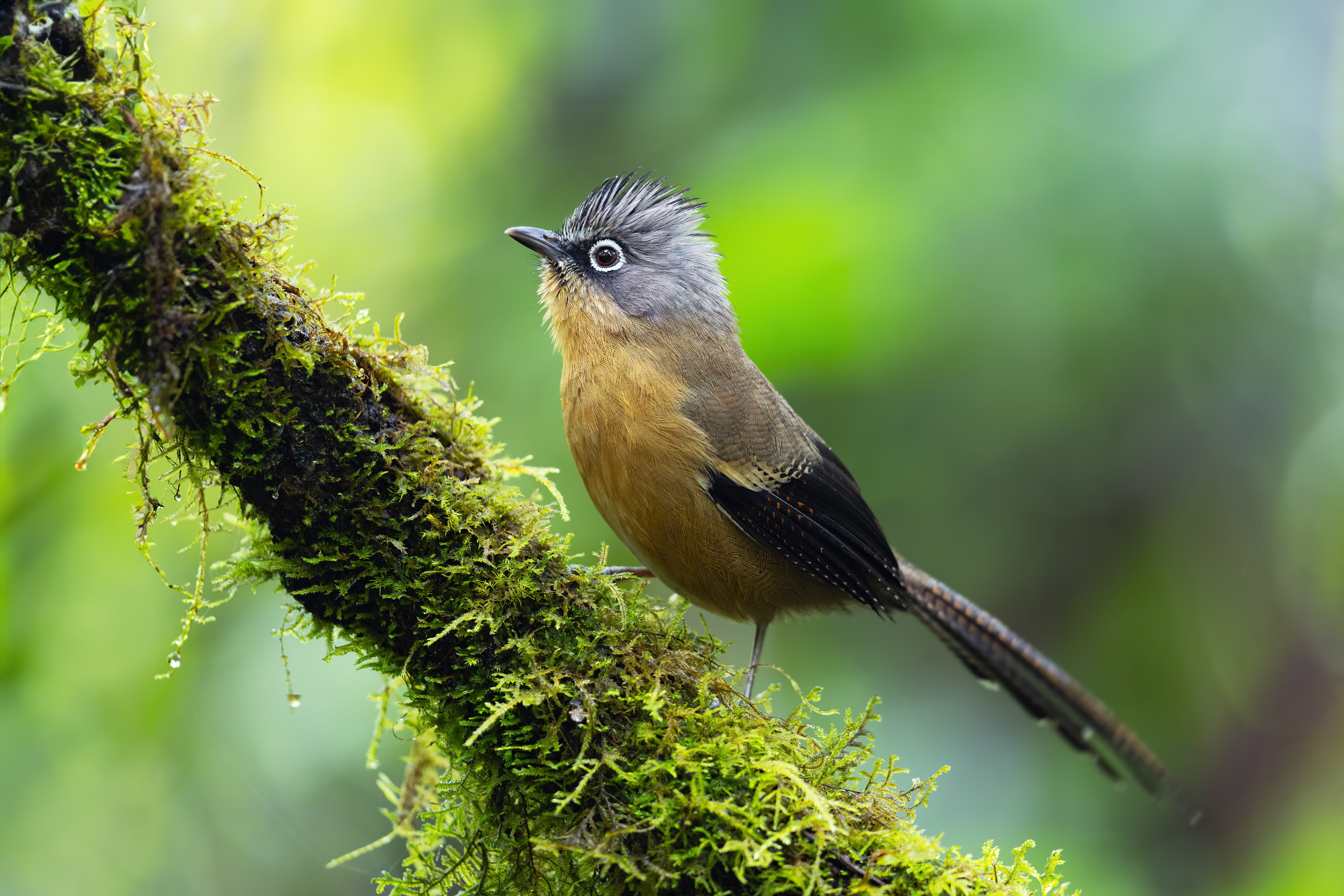

Conservation status
- Near Threatened (IUCN 3.1)

Scientific classification
- Kingdom: Animalia
- Phylum: Chordata
- Class: Aves
- Order: Passeriformes
- Family: Leiothrichidae
- Genus: Actinodura
- Species: A. sodangorum

Binomial name
- Actinodura sodangorum Eames, JC, Trai Trong Le, Nguyen Cu & Eve, 1998

= Black-crowned barwing =

Species of bird

The black-crowned barwing (Actinodura sodangorum) is a non-migratory bird from Indochina in the family Leiothrichidae (laughingthrushes and allies). The genus name Actinodura is from Ancient Greek meaning "ray-like tail" (actinodes and ura), while the specific epithet sodangorum is from the Xo Dang tribe which lives in Ngoc Linh and other areas in Vietnam, Cambodia and Laos where black-crowned barwings are found.

== Taxonomy ==
The first black-crowned barwing sighting was reported in April 1996 at Ngọc Linh, Vietnam. Prior to survey, the central highland area of Vietnam was mostly ornithologically undiscovered. Many observations were made by Jonathon Charles Eames and Roland Eve, but it took until 17 March 1998 to trap a male bird. An official species description was later published in 1999.

Black-crowned barwings consist of a monotypic group; having no other discovered subspecies. They were quickly classified into Actinodura since they are very similar to Actinodura ramsayi in appearance. Three plumage differences set them apart; the lores are black, the posterior is darker olive-brown, and the tail feathers are darker with narrower white tips.

== Description ==
The black-crowned barwing is the only bird in the genus Actinodura to have a black crown. The transverse barring on the wings (wingbars) and the crest are characteristic of the genus. The sexes are similar in appearance. It has a grey head and nape, black crown and lore (space between eye and beak), white eye rings, dark brown irises, and dark beak with a flesh coloured tip. The throat is streaked with black-brown on a base of rufous-orange that matches the breast and belly area. The posterior parts of the body (mantle, back, rump, and uppertail coverts) are olive-brown with indistinct dark bars. The wings have fine bars on the scapulars (upper wing section) and black-brown with chestnut or orange-buff bars on most of the flight feathers (primaries and secondaries). Their long tail is graduated chestnut with white tips and broad black bars.

=== Measurements ===
The lengths are approximately:

- Upper beak (culmen) = 17.5 mm (0.69 in)
- Leg length (starting from under the knees) = 31 mm (1.2 in)
- Single wing length (measured from chord to mass) = 89 mm (3.5 in)
- Tail-length = 133 mm (5.2 in)

== Distribution and habitat ==
They are resident at three locations in Laos and at seven locations in Vietnam. They are also found in Important Bird and Biodiversity Areas (IBA) including the DakChung Plateau, Lo Xo Pass, and Ngoc Linh.

Their natural habitats are subtropical or tropical moist montane forest, subtropical or tropical high-altitude shrubland, subtropical or tropical high-altitude grassland, and plantations. Although they use degraded/cleared forests, they are mostly found in secondary growth or evergreen forests.

Their elevation maximum was at 2,400 m (7,900 ft), with observers noting fewer sightings above 2,200 m (7,200 ft). The minimum elevation range could not be determined properly since the site contained loss of forest habitat below 1,500 m (4,900 ft), though there were sightings at 1,000 m (3,300 ft).

== Behaviour ==
Sightings have been either of single birds or in pairs.

=== Vocalisation ===
Most observations were of singing birds since they are easily identified through song and were responsive to playbacks, which was a commonly used technique. They call the most in early morning, decreasing through the day, which could be caused by rainfall reducing their activity.

They have two distinctive calls:

- One of the calls begins with a male or female giving two or three "wa" wails that sound cat-like with the first note always weakest and the second note stronger. After 5–20 calls from the initiator, the second bird responds with five or six short notes with overall same length and pitch.
- The other call lasts for as long as the first bird continues and includes antiphonal duets, where males and females respond to each other differently. Pairs were also spotted sitting side-by-side mutually preening between their calls.

=== Diet ===
Their diet is not well known, but they are suspected to be insectivores that also eat vegetation. The bird is often seen foraging alone or with a partner around the smaller branches of tree canopy, trunk, and along larger moss-covered branches.

=== Breeding ===
Mates are first attracted through calling, then move to small branches in shrubs while perching close or against each other. The male displays by raising his crest and half-fanning his feathers while the female opens her wings less frequently and leans steeply over her perch. They preen each other briefly and rapidly with light pecking, while switching positions. Instances of copulating or almost copulating involved the birds swinging full circle around a branch where their tail-bases would briefly touch while moving downwards. This behaviour is not known in barwings, but is more common in babblers (family Timaliidae).

Generation lengths are around 5.5 years.

Eggs and nest are undescribed.

== Conservation status ==
It is threatened by habitat loss and is considered Near Threatened on the IUCN Red List.
