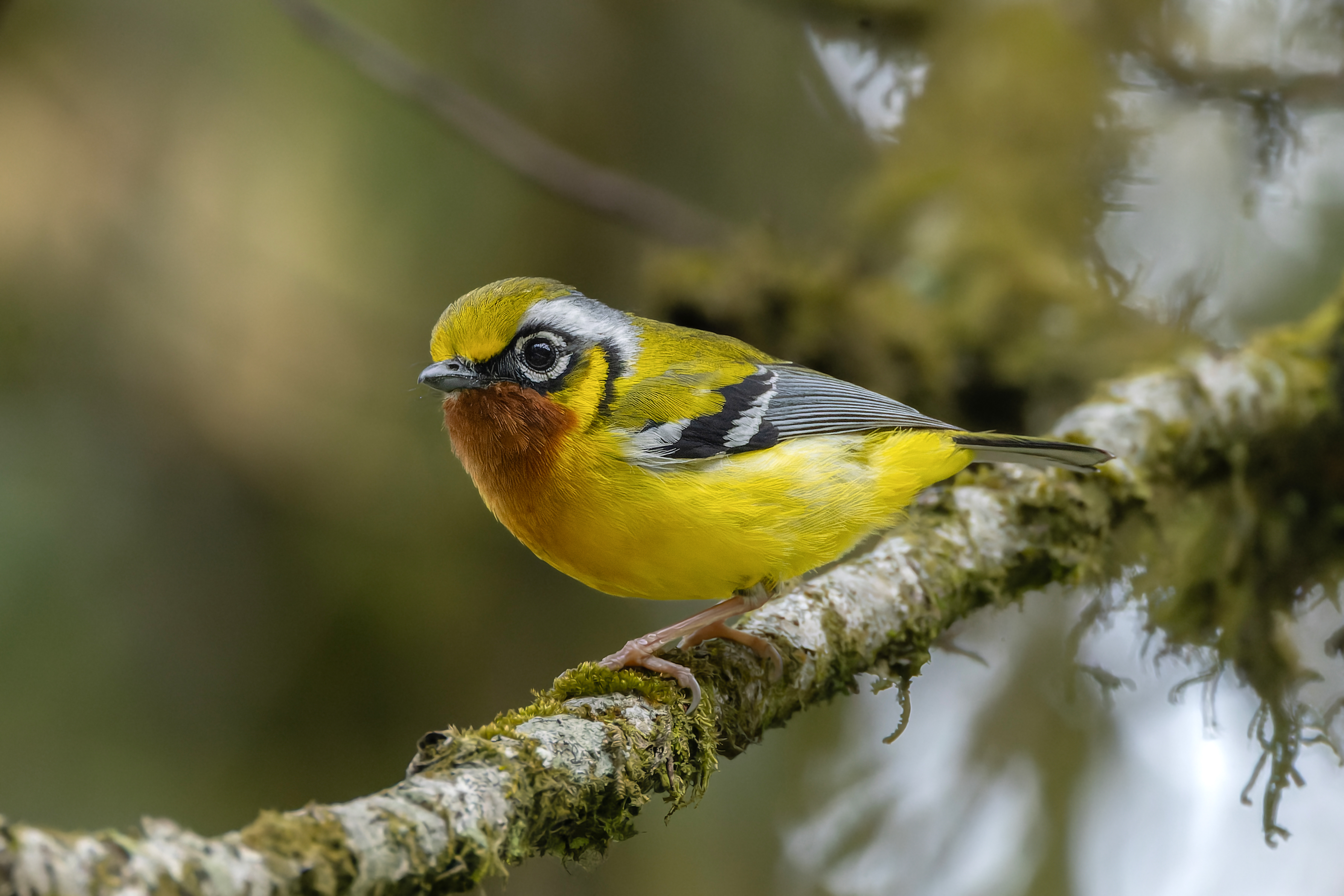
- In Lava, West Bengal, India.
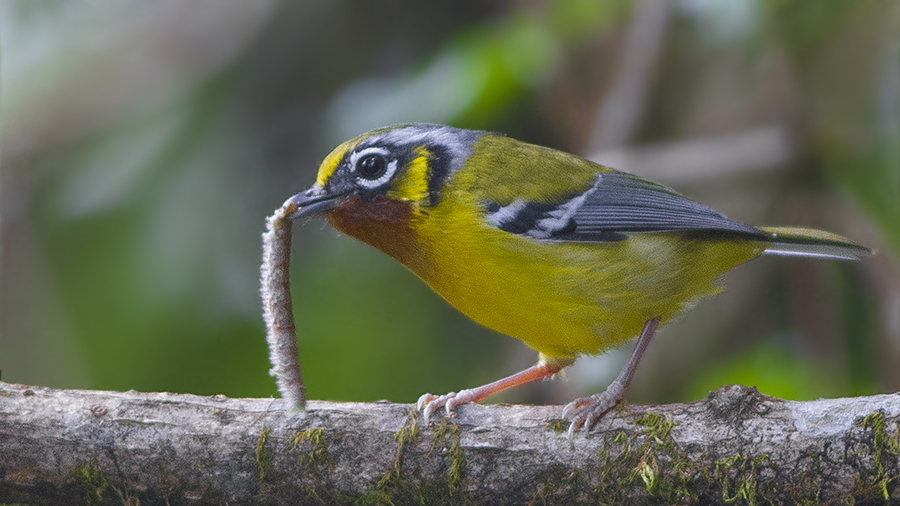
- Subspecies Pteruthius melanotis melanotis from Khangchendzonga National Park, Sikkim, India.

Conservation status
- Least Concern (IUCN 3.1)

Scientific classification
- Kingdom: Animalia
- Phylum: Chordata
- Class: Aves
- Order: Passeriformes
- Family: Vireonidae
- Genus: Pteruthius
- Species: P. melanotis

Binomial name
- Pteruthius melanotis Hodgson, 1847

= Black-eared shrike-babbler =

Species of bird

The black-eared shrike-babbler (Pteruthius melanotis) is a bird species in the vireo family, Vireonidae. It was traditionally considered as an aberrant Old World babbler and formerly placed in the family Timaliidae. It was long noted that their habits resembled those of vireos, but this was previously ascribed to the result of convergent evolution. It is found in Southeast Asia from the Himalayas to western Malaysia. Its natural habitat is subtropical or tropical moist montane forests.

== Gallery ==
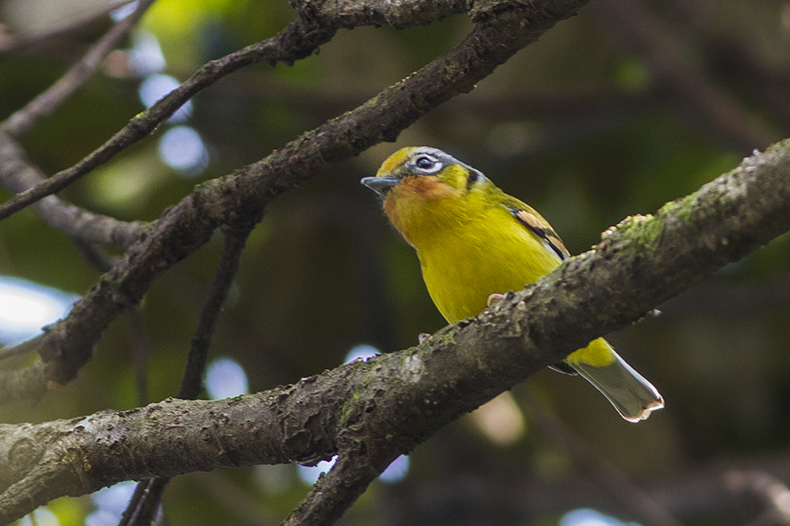
Pteruthius melanotis melanotis from Fambong Lho Wildlife Sanctuary, Sikkim, India

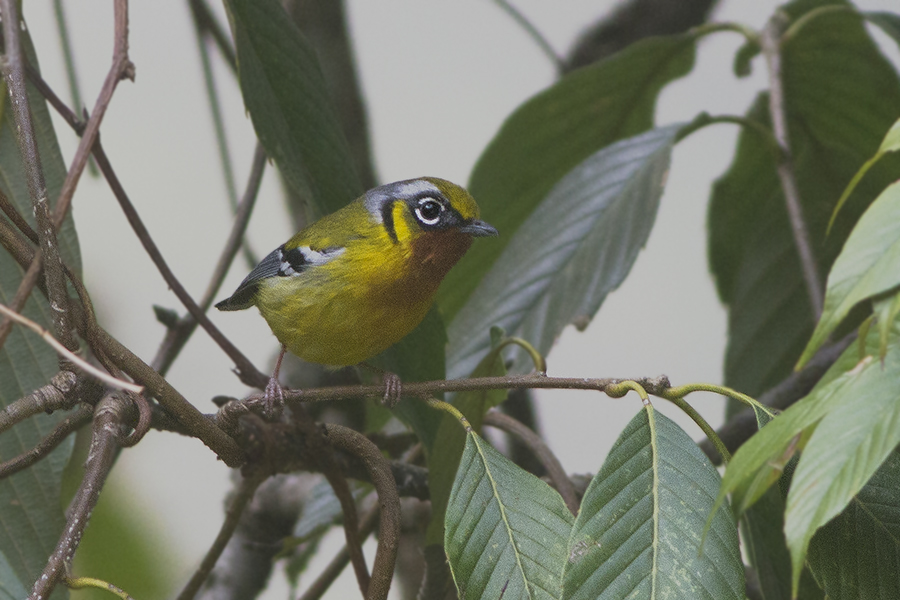
Pteruthius melanotis melanotis from Neora Valley National Park, West Bengal, India.

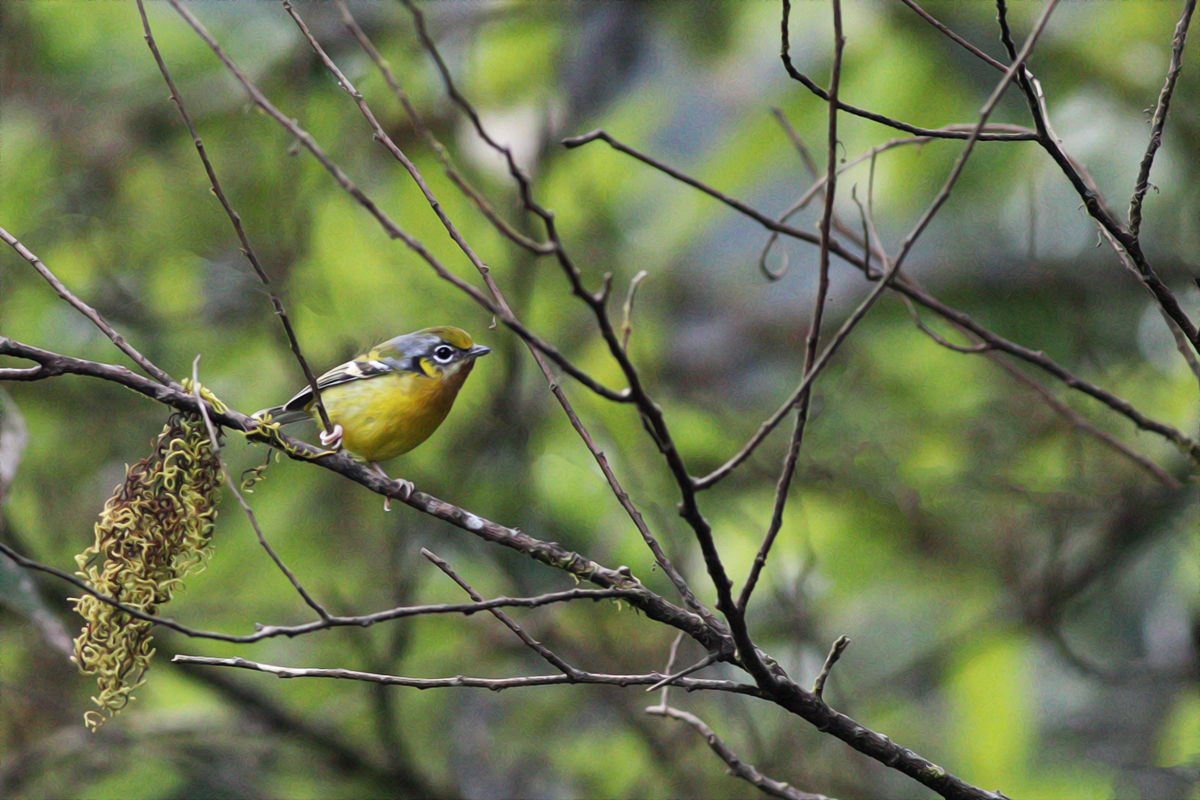
Pteruthius melanotis melanotis from Khonoma, Nagaland, India
