= Fambong Lho Wildlife Sanctuary =

Wildlife sanctuary in Sikkim, India

- IUCN category IV (habitat/species management area)
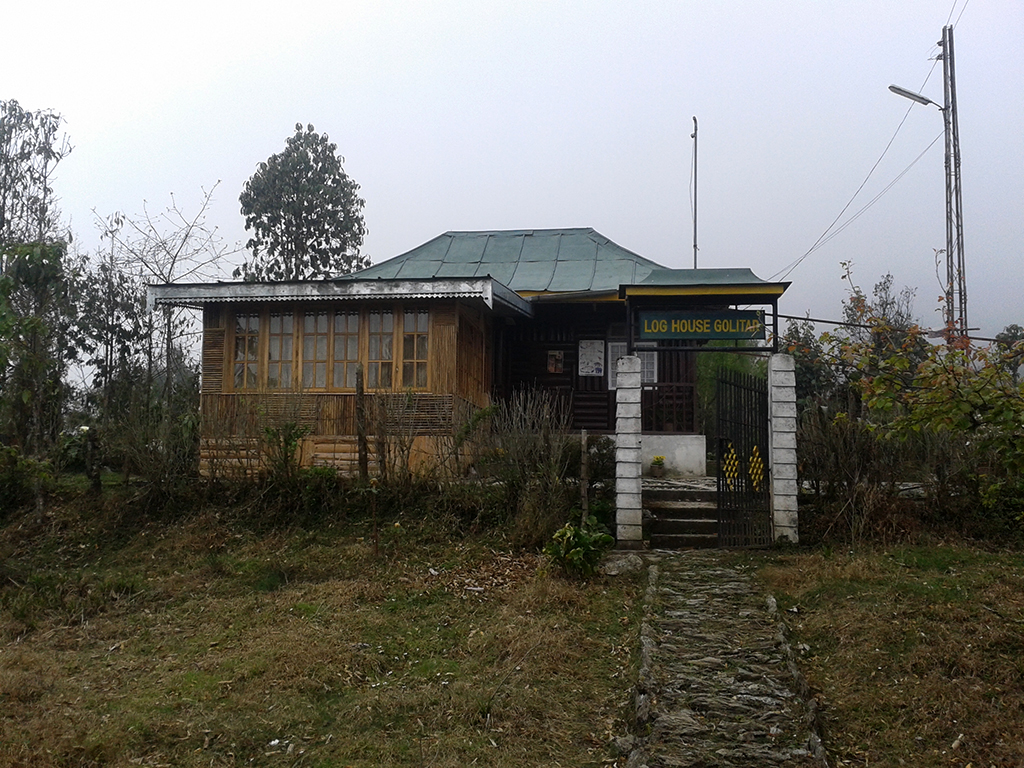
- Old log house at Golitar inside Fambong Lho Wildlife Sanctuary

- Location within Sikkim Location within India
- Interactive map of Fambong Lho Wildlife Sanctuary
- Location: Gangtok district, Sikkim
- Nearest city: Gangtok
- Coordinates: 27°18′40.68″N 88°32′1.2″E
- Area: 51.760 km^{2} (19.985 sq mi)
- Established: 1984
- Governing body: Government of India, Government of Sikkim

Fambong Lho Wildlife Sanctuary (Devanagari: फाम्बोन्ग ल्हो) is a 51 km^{2} (20 sq mi) large wildlife sanctuary in Gangtok district of the state of Sikkim in India. It is contiguous with Khangchendzonga National Park and located around 30 km (19 mi) west of Gangtok. It hosts a few small hamlets inside, namely Dikchu, Pangthang, and Mangan and is managed by State Forest Department.

== Geography ==
Elevation in Fambong Lho Wildlife Sanctuary ranges from 1,524 to 2,749 m (5,000 to 9,019 ft).

At the top of Fambong Lho Wildlife Sanctuary is Chuli hamlet. No human habitat is there between the log house of Fambong Lho and Chuli. Gangtok is in the eastern side of this place and Khangchendzonga National Park in its west. Some riverine tributaries flowing through this sanctuary discharge in Teesta and Dikchuu river. These riverine tributaries flowing from north enriches its biodiversity. The highest point of this wildlife sanctuary is Tinjure.

Inside this wildlife sanctuary, the primary ecoregions and their corresponding biomes are:

- Terai-Duar savanna and grasslands of the tropical and subtropical grasslands, savannas, and shrublands biome,
- Eastern Himalayan broadleaf forests of the tropical and subtropical moist broadleaf forests biome,
- Himalayan subtropical pine forests of the tropical and subtropical coniferous forests biome,
- Eastern Himalayan subalpine conifer forests of the temperate coniferous forests biome, and
- Eastern Himalayan alpine shrub and meadows of the montane grasslands and shrublands biome.

== Fauna ==
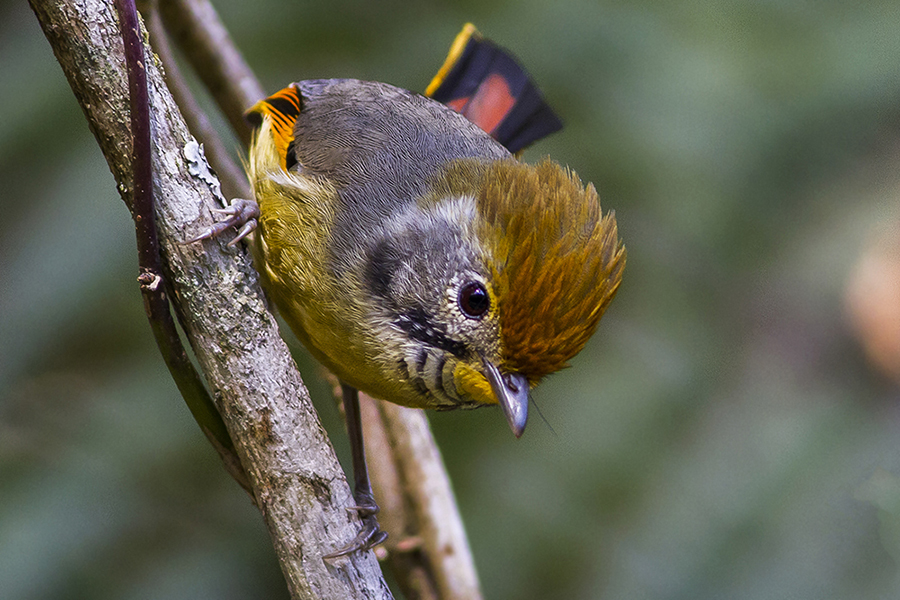
Bar-throated minla (Minla strigula strigula)

Mammals regularly sighted include barking deer, yellow-throated marten, Himalayan brown bear and red panda. Beside these, takin, red fox and musk deer are also present at higher altitudes. Some very commonly seen mammals in this wildlife sanctuary are Himalayan striped squirrel and Royle's pika.

Situated at the junction of Palearctic realm and Indomalayan realm, Fambong Lho Wildlife Sanctuary harbours a large variety of mammalian and avian fauna. Birds at Fambong Lho Wildlife Sanctuary include species like the hill partridge, satyr tragopan, fire-tailed myzornis, bar-throated minla, red-tailed minla, black-eared shrike babbler, scaly laughingthrush, streak-breasted scimitar babbler, rusty-fronted barwing, yellow-browed tit, red-headed bullfinch, crimson-browed finch, chestnut-crowned warbler. The rufous-headed hornbill has been sighted here.

== Threats ==
On 4 February 2017, a major fire broke out at Tinjurey Ridge in the sanctuary. 18 helicopters were sent to douse the fire, which took several days.
