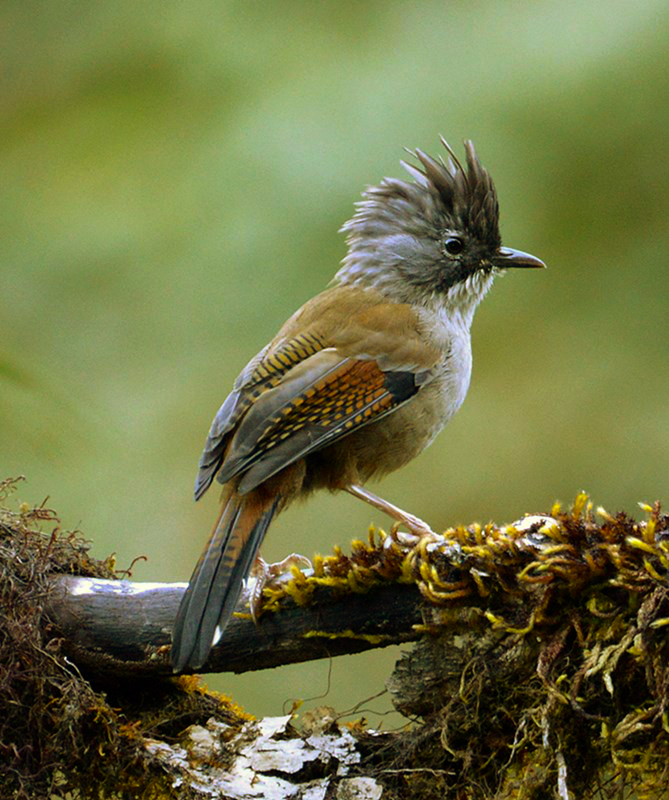

Conservation status
- Least Concern (IUCN 3.1)

Scientific classification
- Kingdom: Animalia
- Phylum: Chordata
- Class: Aves
- Order: Passeriformes
- Family: Leiothrichidae
- Genus: Actinodura
- Species: A. waldeni

Binomial name
- Actinodura waldeni Godwin-Austen, 1874

Synonyms
- Sibia waldeni

= Streak-throated barwing =

Species of bird

The streak-throated barwing (Actinodura waldeni) is a species of bird in the family Leiothrichidae. It is found in western Yunnan, southern Tibet, Northeast India and Myanmar.

Its natural habitat is subtropical or tropical moist montane forest.

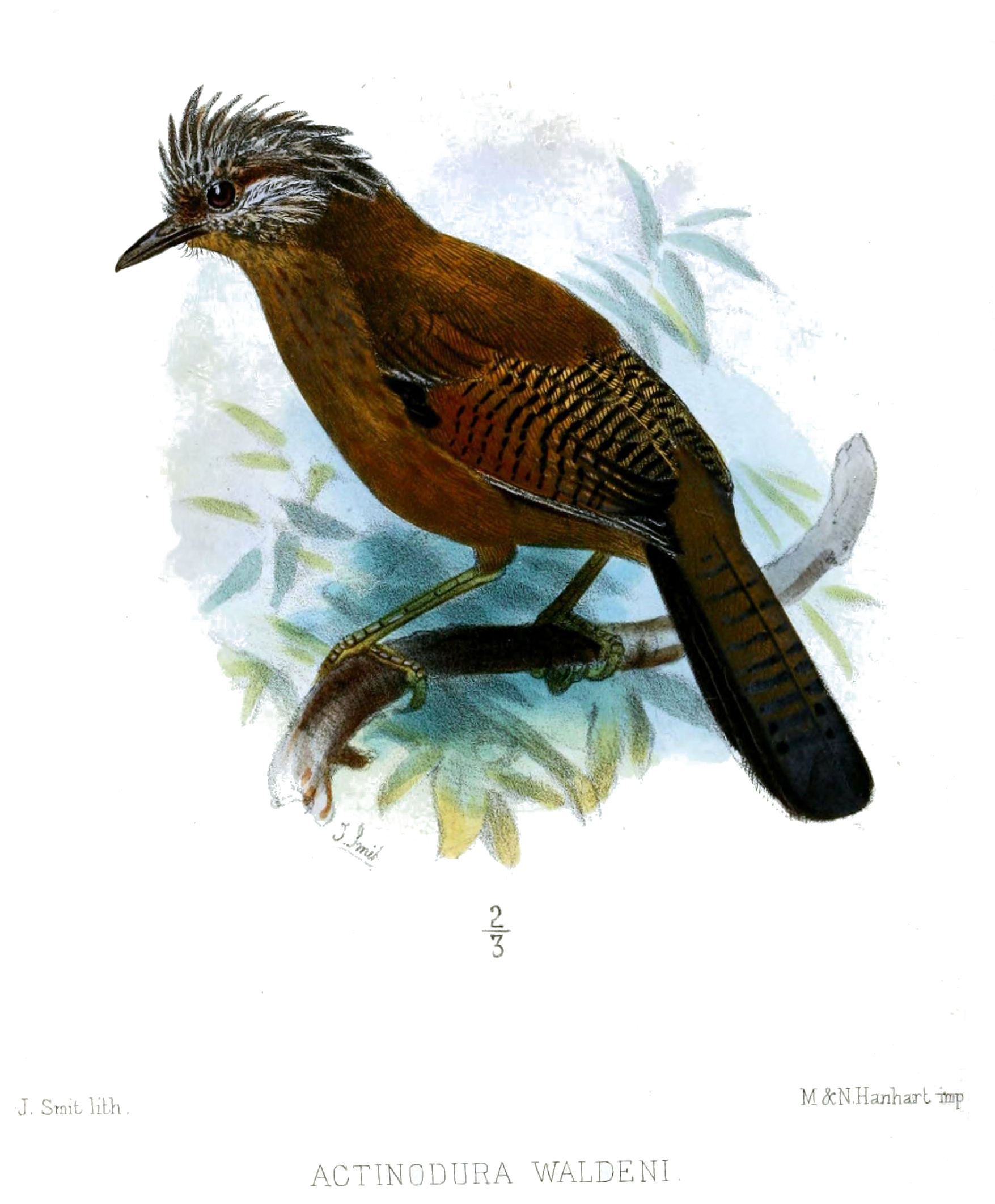
