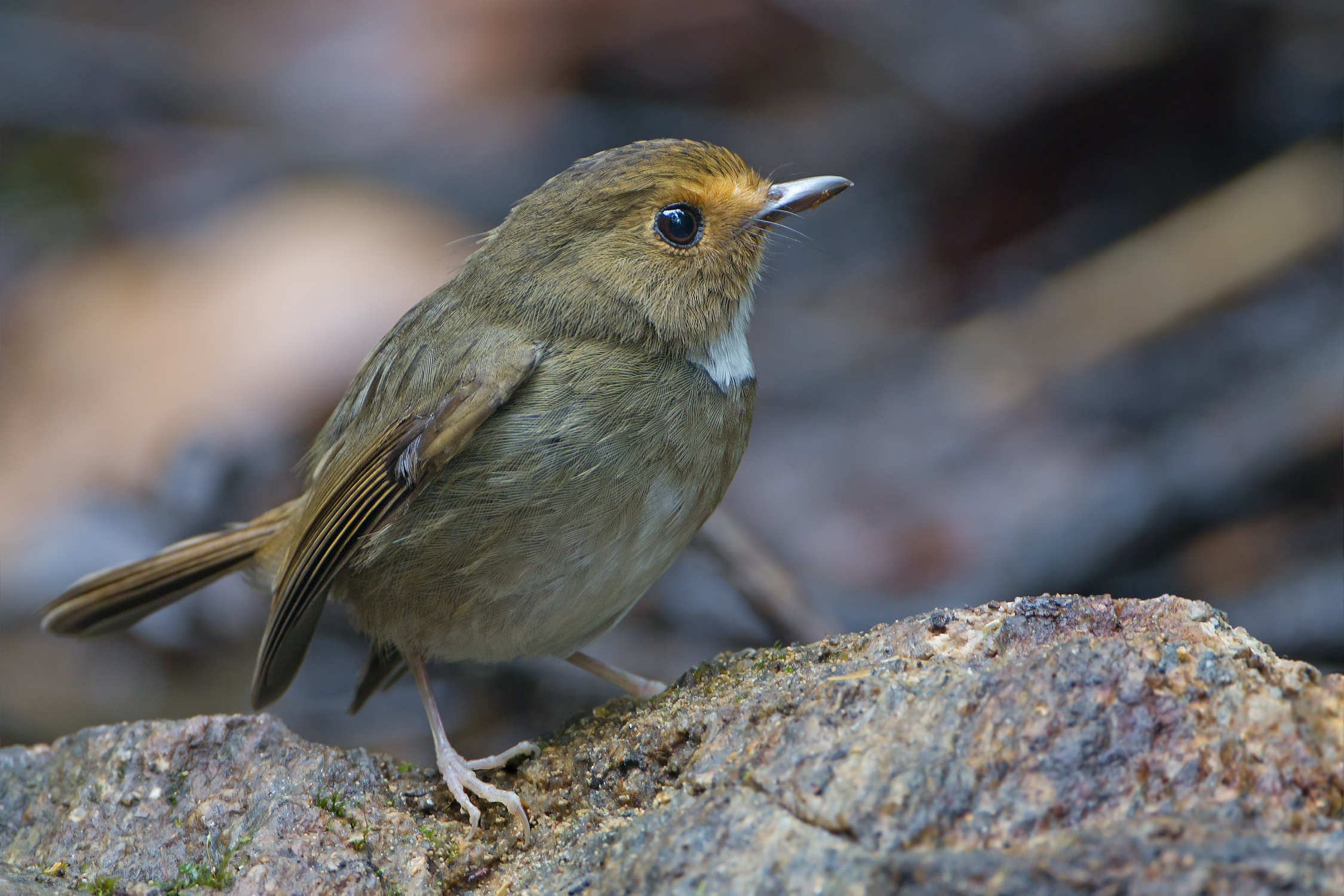
- Rufous-browed flycatcher (Anthipes solitaris)

Scientific classification
- Kingdom: Animalia
- Phylum: Chordata
- Class: Aves
- Order: Passeriformes
- Family: Muscicapidae
- Genus: Anthipes; Blyth, 1847

Type species
- Dimorpha monileger Hodgson, 1845

= Anthipes =

Genus of birds

The Anthipes flycatchers are a genus of Old World flycatchers.

The genus contains the following species:

- White-gorgeted flycatcher, Anthipes monileger
- Rufous-browed flycatcher, Anthipes solitaris
