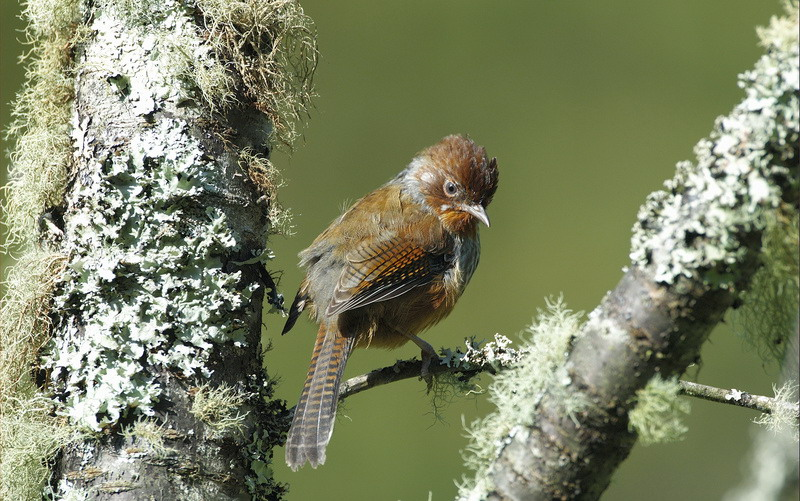
- Taiwan barwing (Actinodura morrisoniana)

Scientific classification
- Kingdom: Animalia
- Phylum: Chordata
- Class: Aves
- Order: Passeriformes
- Family: Leiothrichidae
- Genus: Actinodura; Gould, 1836

Type species
- Actinodura egertoni Gould, 1836

Species
- See text

= Barwing =

Genus of birds

The barwings are the genus Actinodura of passerine birds in the family Leiothrichidae. They are found in the hills of Southern Asia, from Eastern India to China and Taiwan.

== Taxonomy ==
The genus Actinodura was introduced in 1836 by the English ornithologist John Gould with Actinodura egertoni Gould, 1836, the rusty-fronted barwing, as the type species. The genus name combines the Ancient Greek ακτινωδης/aktinōdēs meaning "like rays" with ουρα/oura meaning "tail".

The genus contains nine species:

Image	Common name	Scientific name	Distribution
	Bar-throated minla	Actinodura strigula	central Nepal through India, southern China and Bhutan
	Spectacled barwing	Actinodura ramsayi	China, Laos, Myanmar, Thailand, and Vietnam
	Rusty-fronted barwing	Actinodura egertoni	Southeast Asia from the Himalayas to north-eastern Myanmar
	Blue-winged minla	Actinodura cyanouroptera	Bangladesh, Bhutan, Cambodia, China, India, Laos, Malaysia, Myanmar, Nepal, Thailand, Tibet, and Vietnam
	Hoary-throated barwing	Actinodura nipalensis	Bhutan, India, Tibet, and Nepal
	Black-crowned barwing	Actinodura sodangorum	Laos and Vietnam
	Streaked barwing	Actinodura souliei	China and Vietnam
	Streak-throated barwing	Actinodura waldeni	western Yunnan, southern Tibet, Northeast India and Myanmar
	Taiwan barwing	Actinodura morrisoniana	Taiwan
