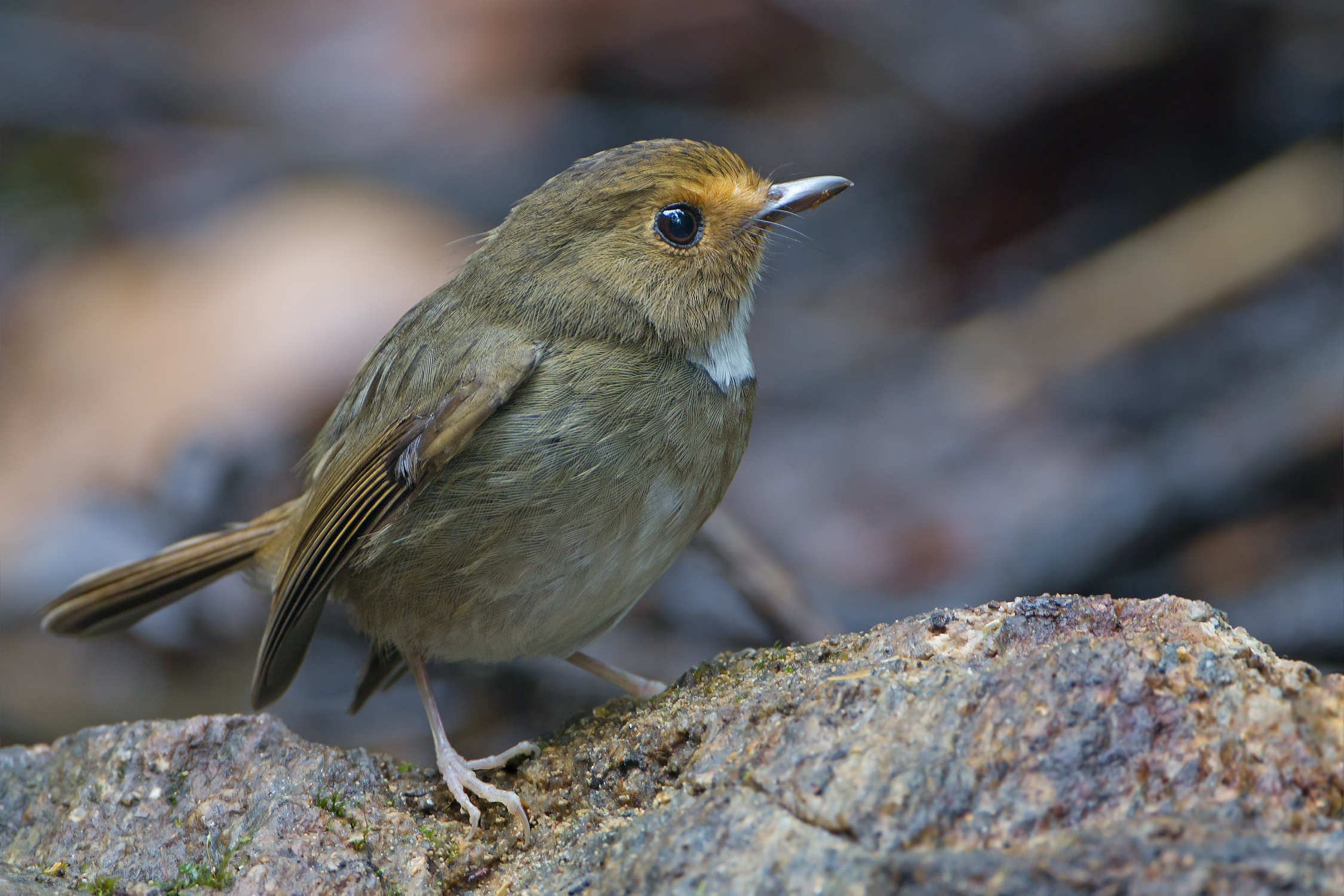

Conservation status
- Least Concern (IUCN 3.1)

Scientific classification
- Kingdom: Animalia
- Phylum: Chordata
- Class: Aves
- Order: Passeriformes
- Family: Muscicapidae
- Genus: Anthipes
- Species: A. solitaris

Binomial name
- Anthipes solitaris (Müller, 1836)

Synonyms
- Digenea solitaris; Ficedula solitaris

= Rufous-browed flycatcher =

Species of bird

The rufous-browed flycatcher (Anthipes solitaris) is a species of bird in the family Muscicapidae. It is native to Indonesia, Laos, Malaysia, Myanmar, Thailand and Vietnam. Its natural habitat is subtropical or tropical moist montane forests. It was formerly placed in the genus Ficedula.
