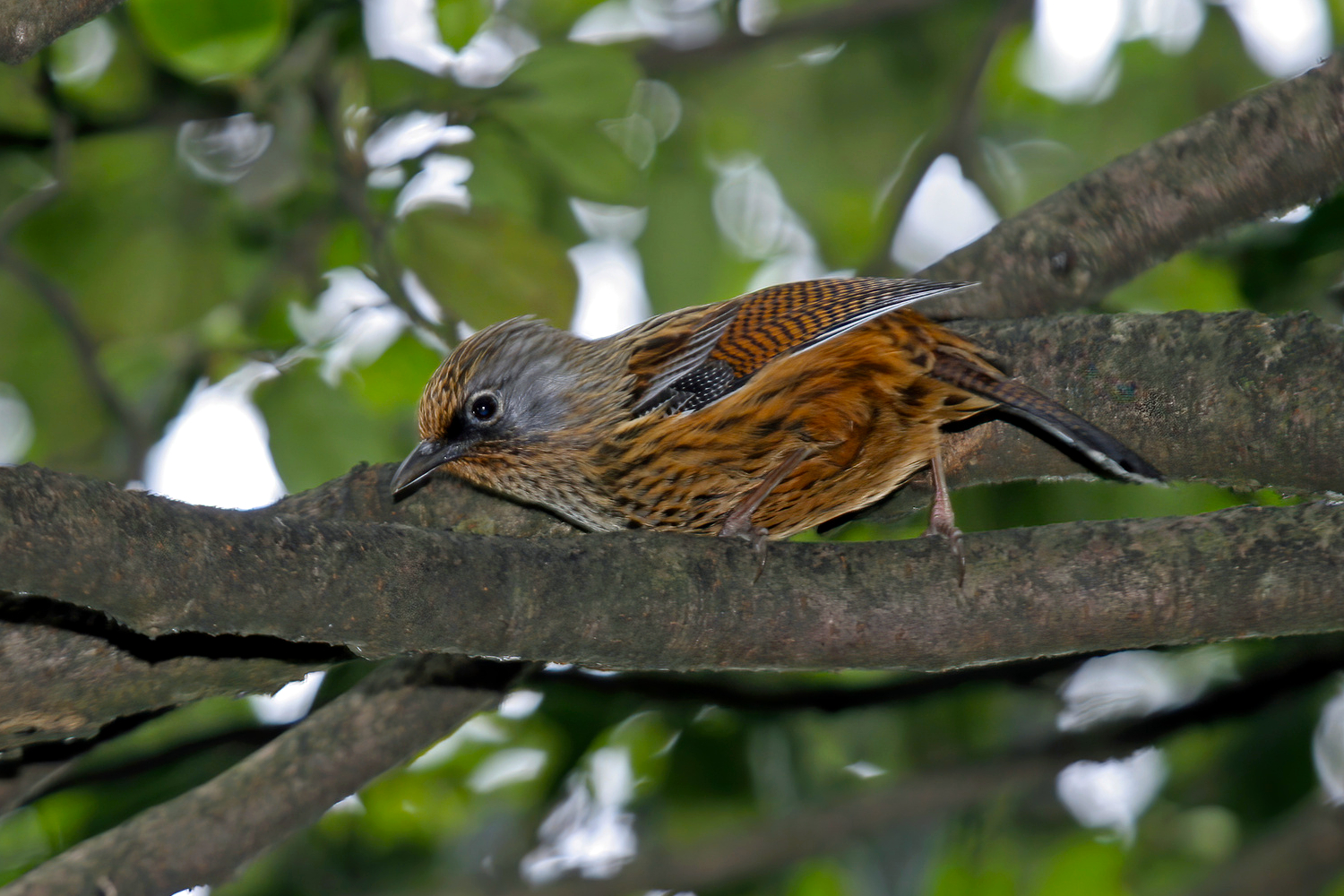
- Actinodura souliei souliei in Pingshan County, Sichuan, China

Conservation status
- Least Concern (IUCN 3.1)<ref

Scientific classification
- Kingdom: Animalia
- Phylum: Chordata
- Class: Aves
- Order: Passeriformes
- Family: Leiothrichidae
- Genus: Actinodura
- Species: A. souliei

Binomial name
- Actinodura souliei Oustalet, 1897

Synonyms
- Sibia souliei

= Streaked barwing =

Species of bird

The streaked barwing (Actinodura souliei) is a species of bird in the family Leiothrichidae. The species is found at altitudes of 1,700 to 3,000 metres (5,600 to 9,800 ft) in China in Sichuan and Yunnan, as well as northwestern Vietnam in provinces such as Lai Châu, Lào Cail, Hà Giang, Điện Biên, Sơn La, and Yên Bái. Natural habitats include subtropical and tropical moist montane forests. Individuals are 21–23 centimetres (8.3–9.1 in) long, brown overall, with blackish streaks on the breast, and finely barred on the wings and tail; the head is brown, with a greyish cheek patch. The species has been assessed as 'Least concern' by the IUCN Red List in 2016 due to its large range, and although there is a population decline it is not sufficiently rapid enough to approach the thresholds to be assessed as 'Vulnerable'.

Two subspecies are accepted:

- A. s. souliei – northern part of the range, in Sichuan (central China)
- A. s. griseinucha – southern part of the range, in Yunnan (southern China) and Vietnam

The scientific name is after the French missionary Jean-André Soulié, who first discovered it.
