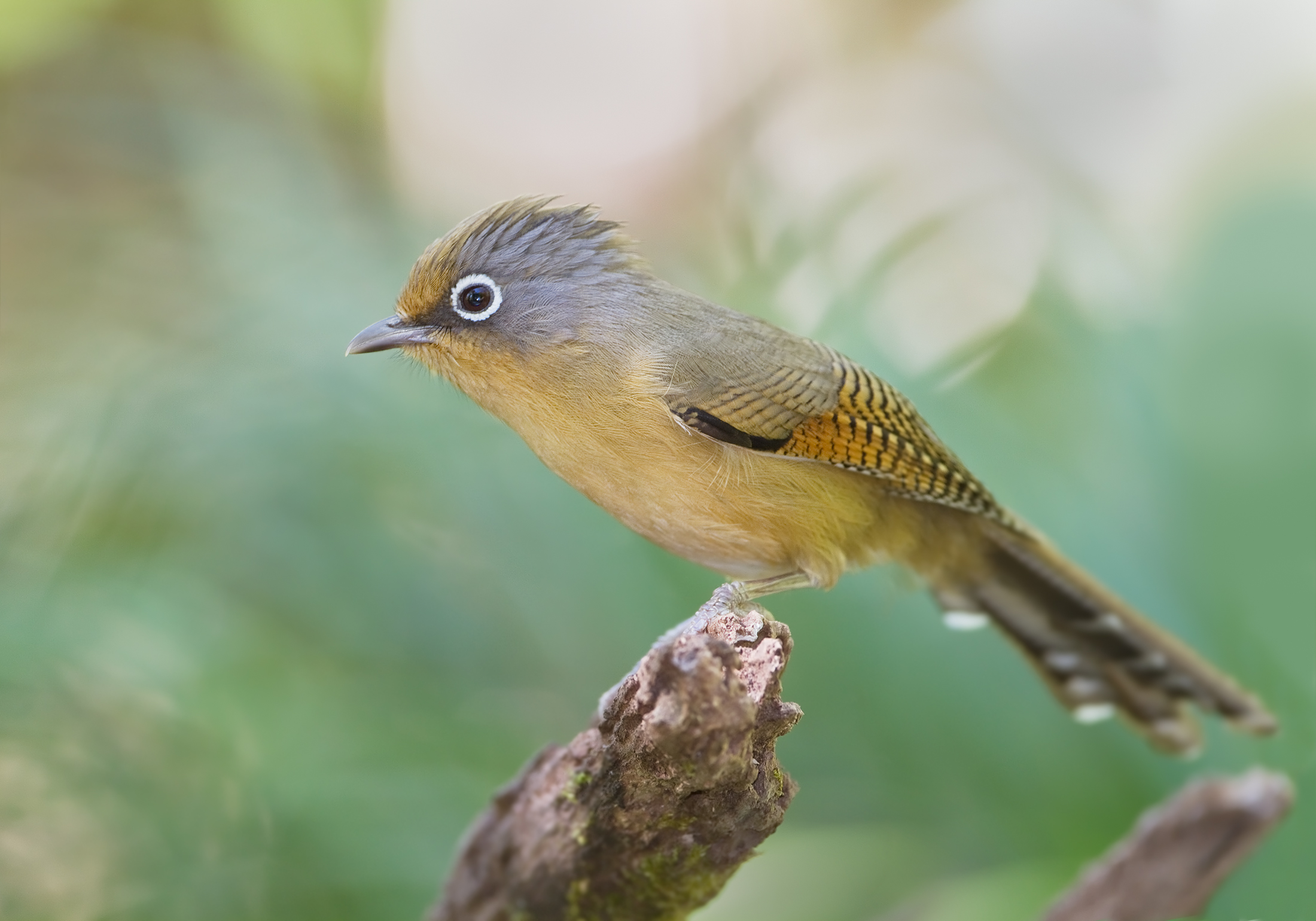

Conservation status
- Least Concern (IUCN 3.1)

Scientific classification
- Kingdom: Animalia
- Phylum: Chordata
- Class: Aves
- Order: Passeriformes
- Family: Leiothrichidae
- Genus: Actinodura
- Species: A. ramsayi

Binomial name
- Actinodura ramsayi Walden, 1875

Synonyms
- Actinura Ramsayi (protonym)

= Spectacled barwing =

Species of bird

The spectacled barwing (Actinodura ramsayi) is a species of bird in the family Leiothrichidae.

It is found in China, Laos, Myanmar, Thailand, and Vietnam.

Its natural habitat is subtropical or tropical moist montane forests.
