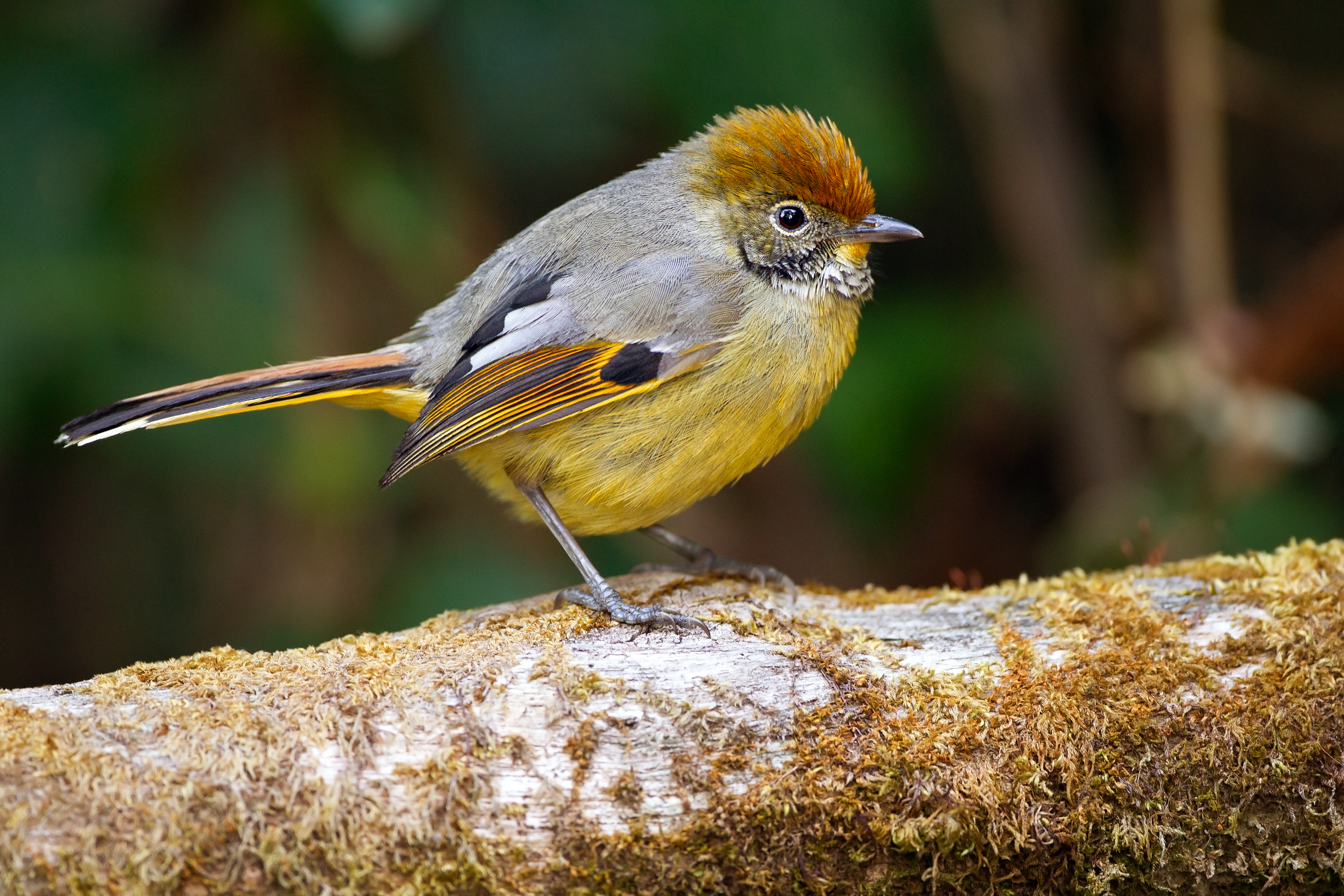
- at Doi Inthanon

Conservation status
- Least Concern (IUCN 3.1)

Scientific classification
- Kingdom: Animalia
- Phylum: Chordata
- Class: Aves
- Order: Passeriformes
- Family: Leiothrichidae
- Genus: Actinodura
- Species: A. strigula

Binomial name
- Actinodura strigula (Hodgson, 1837)

Synonyms
- Chrysominla strigula Minla strigula

= Bar-throated minla =

Species of bird

The bar-throated minla or chestnut-tailed minla (Actinodura strigula), or even bar-throated siva, is a species of bird in the laughingthrush and babbler family Leiothrichidae. Traditionally, it has been placed in the genus Minla but is now placed in Actinodura.

The species is found in montane forest from India to Malaysia.

Eight subspecies have been described, of which six are widely accepted. The nominate subspecies, Chrysominla strigula strigula, is found from central Nepal through India, southern China and Bhutan. C. s. simlaensis is found in northern India and western Nepal, C. s. yunnanensis is found in north-eastern India, southern China, northern Burma, Laos and Vietnam, C. s. castanicauda is found in southern Burma and western and northern Thailand, C. s. malayana is found in Peninsular Malaysia and C. s. traii is restricted to central Vietnam.

The bar-throated minla occupies a range of montane forest habitats from 1,800–3,750 m (5,910–12,300 ft). The species is mainly resident but may move to lower altitudes during harsh winters, coming as low as 1,300 m (4,300 ft). Among the forest types it may occur in are evergreen broadleaf forest, mixed broadleaf and evergreen forest, pine forest, pine or oak and rhododendron forest, rhododendron or bamboo stands.

The diet of the bar-throated minla varies by season; during the summer months it is almost exclusively insectivorous, taking beetles, caterpillars and other insects. In the winter months it will also take berries, seeds, and nectar. It will join flocks of other babblers and yuhinas in the non-breeding season, and feeds from the canopy down to near the forest floor. Two to four eggs are laid in a cup of grass, bamboo leaves, lichen and birch bark.

== Gallery ==
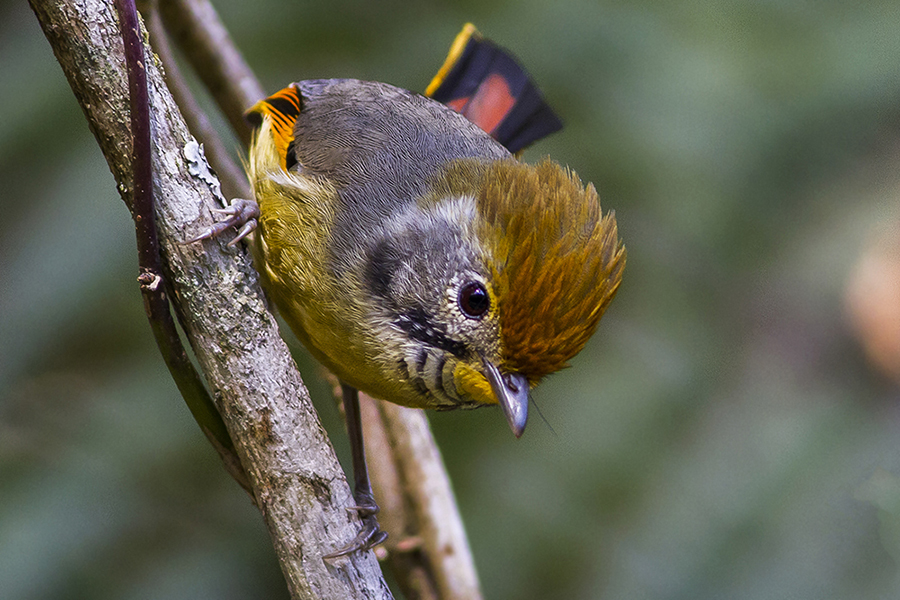
Specimen from Fambong Lho Wildlife Sanctuary, Sikkim, India

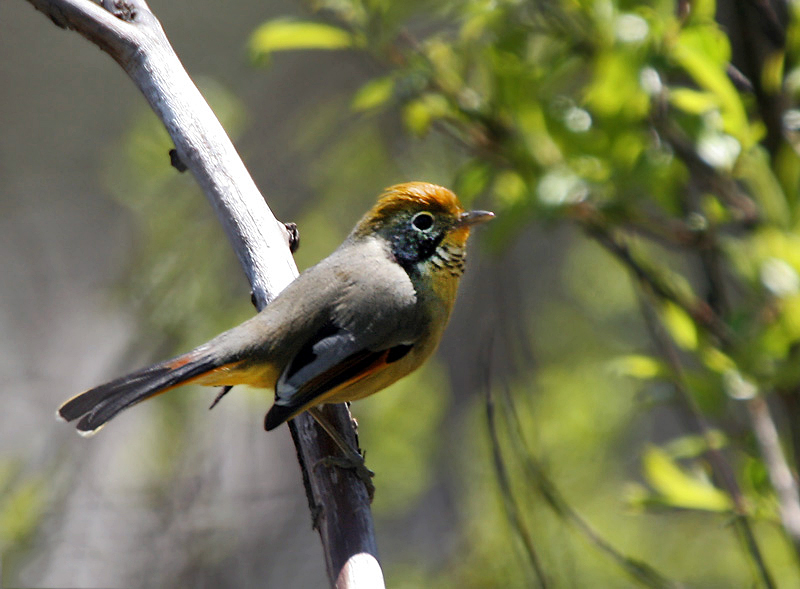
At around 11,000 ft. altitude in Kullu District of Himachal Pradesh, India

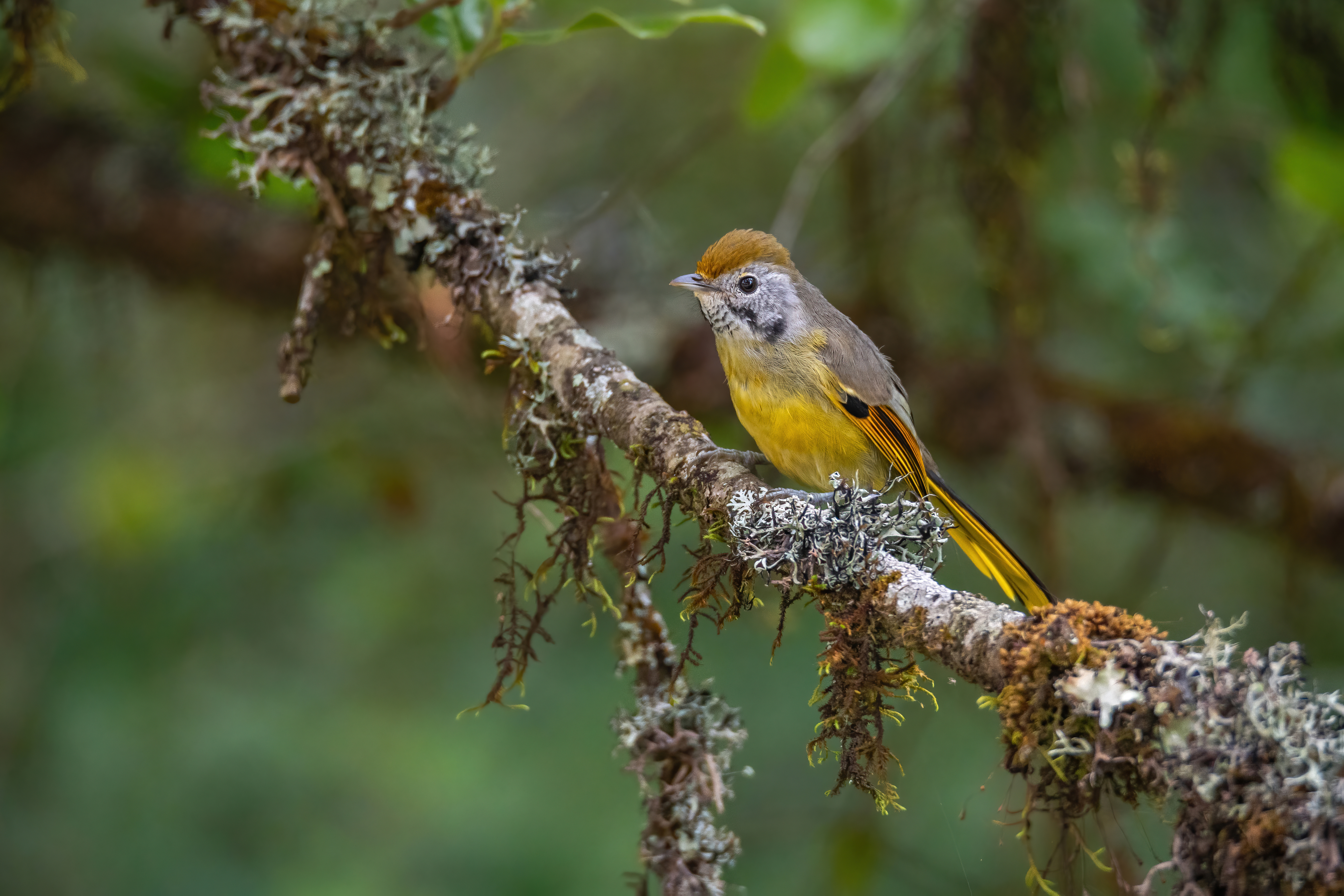
At Phulchowki, Lalitpur, Nepal

Media related to Actinodura strigula at Wikimedia Commons
