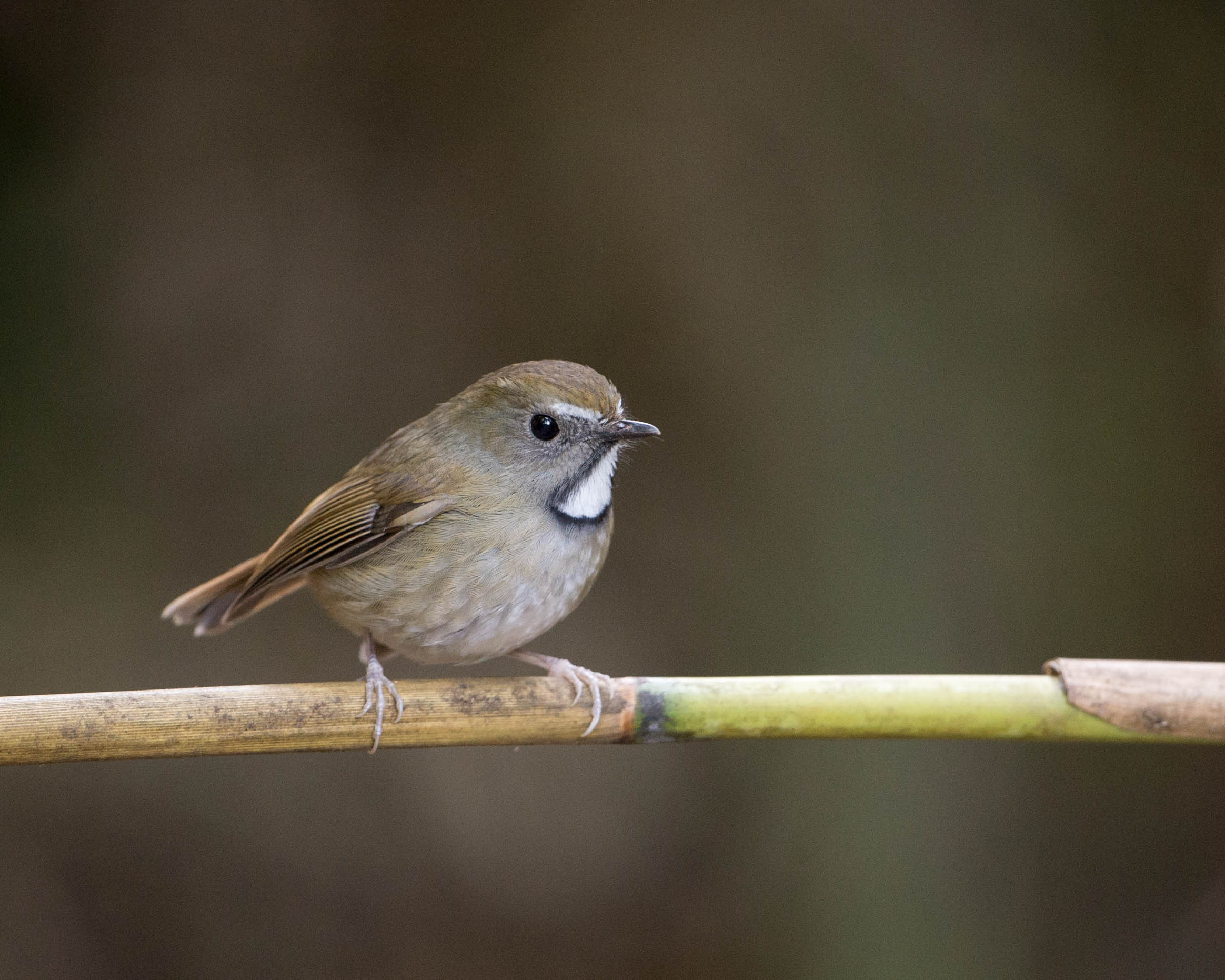

Conservation status
- Least Concern (IUCN 3.1)

Scientific classification
- Kingdom: Animalia
- Phylum: Chordata
- Class: Aves
- Order: Passeriformes
- Family: Muscicapidae
- Genus: Anthipes
- Species: A. monileger

Binomial name
- Anthipes monileger (Hodgson, 1845)

Synonyms
- Digenea moniliger Ficedula monileger

= White-gorgeted flycatcher =

Species of bird

The white-gorgeted flycatcher (Anthipes monileger) is a species of passerine bird in the Old World flycatcher family. It is native to Bangladesh, Bhutan, China, India, Laos, Myanmar, Nepal, Thailand and Vietnam. Its natural habitat is subtropical or tropical moist montane forests. It was formerly placed in the genus Ficedula.
