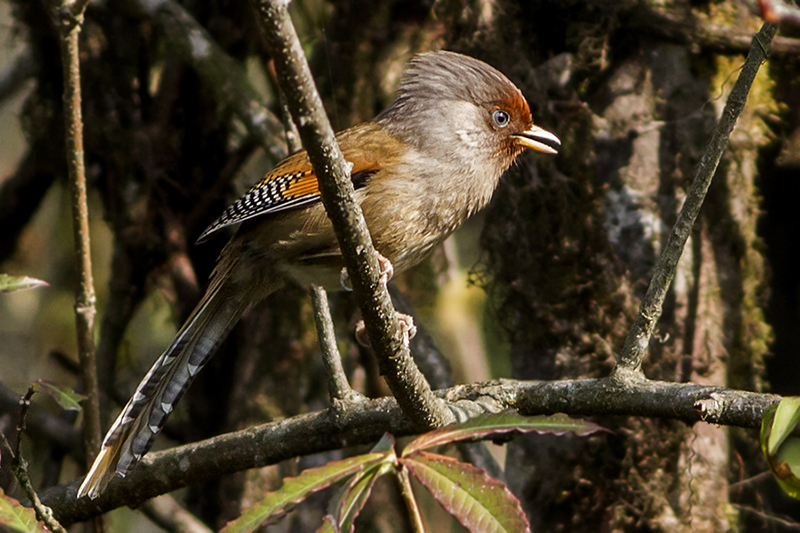
- From Fambong Lho Wildlife Sanctuary, Sikkim, India

Conservation status
- Least Concern (IUCN 3.1)

Scientific classification
- Kingdom: Animalia
- Phylum: Chordata
- Class: Aves
- Order: Passeriformes
- Family: Leiothrichidae
- Genus: Actinodura
- Species: A. egertoni

Binomial name
- Actinodura egertoni Gould, 1836

= Rusty-fronted barwing =

Species of bird

The rusty-fronted barwing (Actinodura egertoni) is a species of bird in the laughingthrush family, Leiothrichidae.

It is found in Southeast Asia from the Himalayas to north-eastern Myanmar. Its natural habitats are temperate forests and subtropical or tropical moist montane forests.

== Gallery ==
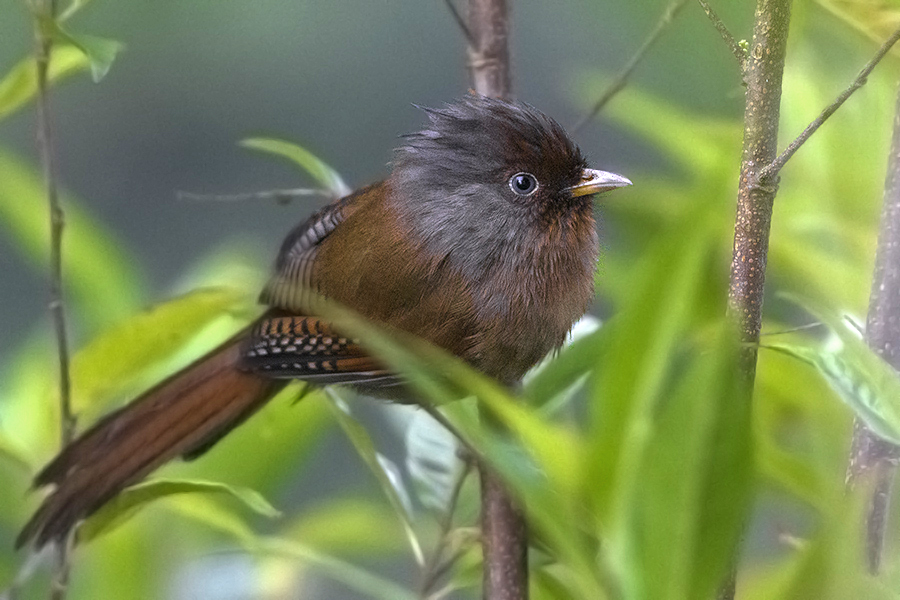
From Pangolakha Wildlife Sanctuary, East Sikkim, India

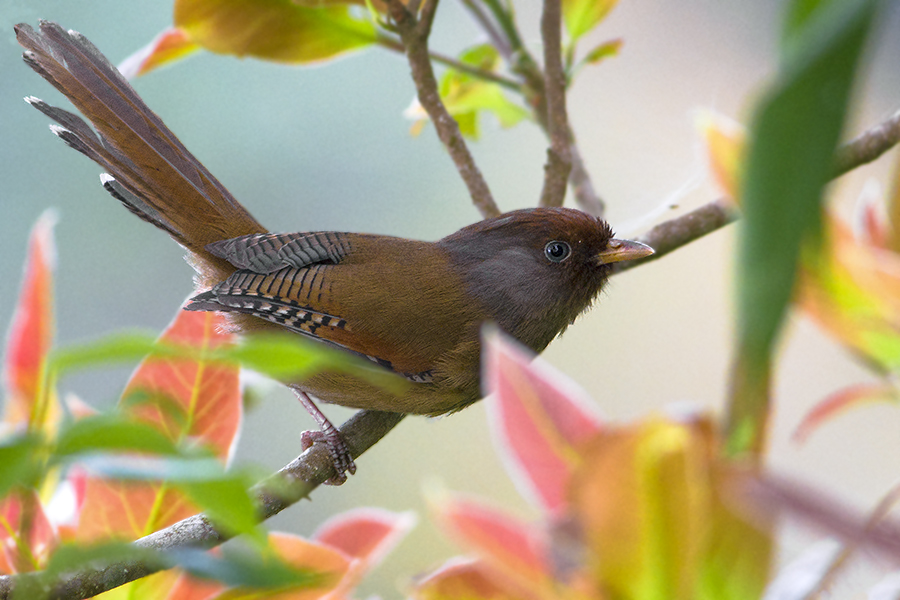
From Pangolakha Wildlife Sanctuary, East Sikkim, India

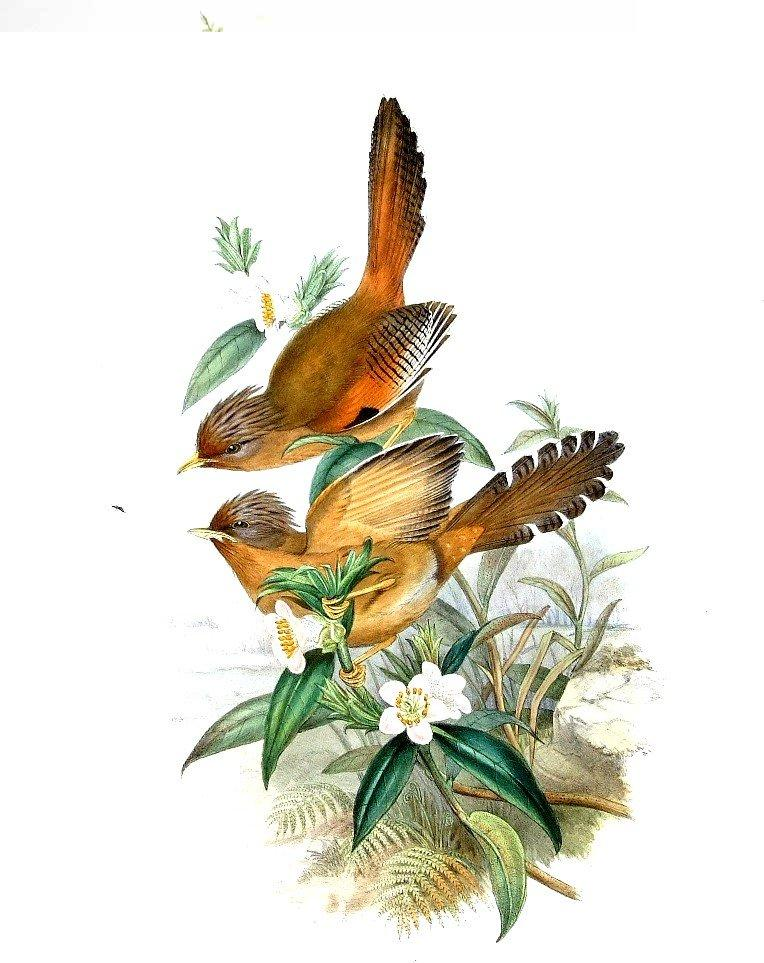
Illustration by John Gould
