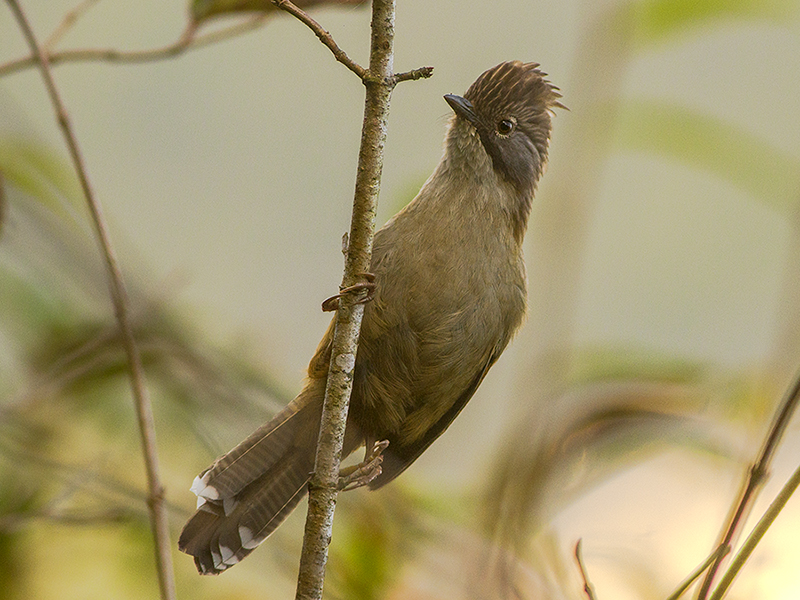
- Neora Valley National Park, West Bengal, India.

Conservation status
- Least Concern (IUCN 3.1)

Scientific classification
- Kingdom: Animalia
- Phylum: Chordata
- Class: Aves
- Order: Passeriformes
- Family: Leiothrichidae
- Genus: Actinodura
- Species: A. nipalensis

Binomial name
- Actinodura nipalensis (Hodgson, 1836)

Synonyms
- Sibia nipalensis

= Hoary-throated barwing =

Species of bird

The hoary-throated barwing (Actinodura nipalensis) is a species of bird in the family Leiothrichidae.

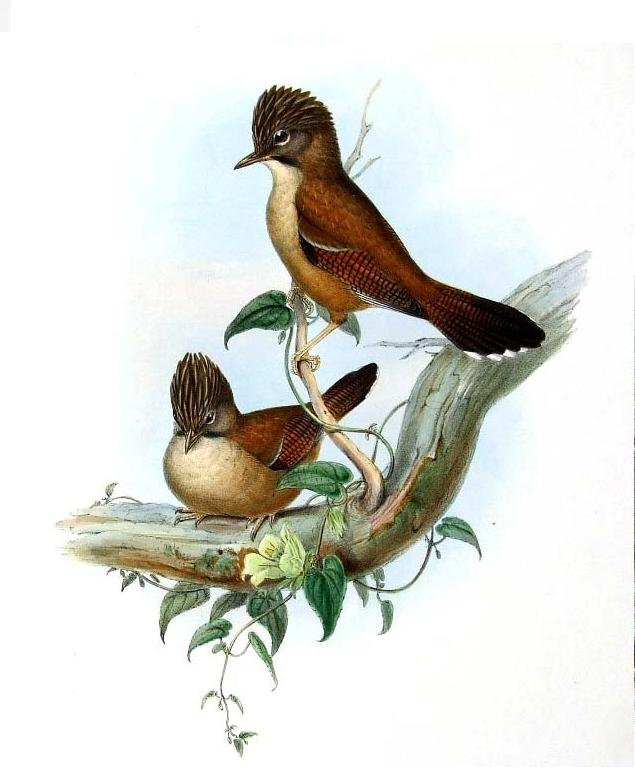
Illustration of John Gould.

It is found in along the northern parts of the Indian subcontinent, primarily in the Eastern Himalayas, and ranges across Bhutan, India, Tibet, and Nepal. Its natural habitats are temperate forest and subtropical or tropical moist montane forest.
