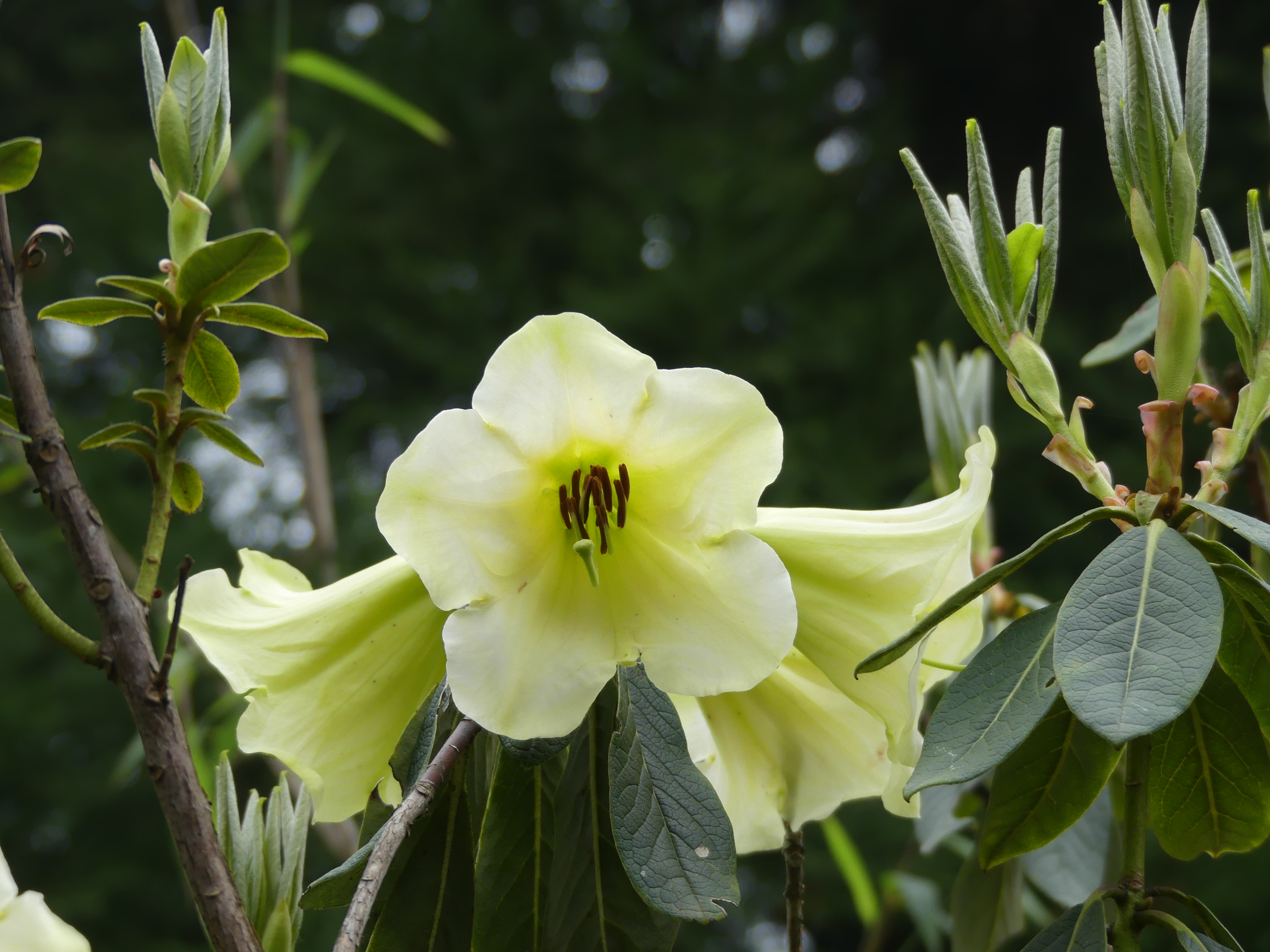

Conservation status
- Vulnerable (IUCN 2.3)

Scientific classification
- Kingdom: Plantae
- Clade: Tracheophytes
- Clade: Angiosperms
- Clade: Eudicots
- Clade: Asterids
- Order: Ericales
- Family: Ericaceae
- Genus: Rhododendron
- Species: R. dalhousiae

Binomial name
- Rhododendron dalhousiae Hooker, 1849

= Rhododendron dalhousiae =

Species of rhododendron

Rhododendron dalhousiae, also known as Lady Dalhousie's rhododendron, is a species of rhododendron first identified in the Eastern Himalayas by Joseph Dalton Hooker during his 1848-1850 expeditions to what is now Sikkim. It is an epiphyte, normally found on tree, cliffs, and boulders, in the lower parts of the Himalayas at altitudes between 5,000 and 9,000 feet. Since its first identification by Hooker, it has been found throughout the southern border of Tibet, Bhutan, Nepal, and northeastern India, particularly in Arunachal Pradesh.

== Description ==
In Nepali R. dalhousiae is called lahare chimal (लहरे चिमाल).

Hooker identified the species during his voyage to India and the Himalayas. The species was named after Lady Susan (née Hay) Dalhousie, the wife of the 10th Earl of Dalhousie, James Andrew Broun-Ramsay, the Governor-General of India at the time who travelled with Hooker at the start of the expedition out of India. However Hooker described R. dalhousiae as “the noblest species of the whole race" and introduced it to England in 1850 where it was extremely popular when it first bloomed, three years after its arrival at Dysart House in Fife, Scotland.

In adult plants, the leaves are 3 to 8 inches in length and up to 3 inches wide. When flowering, it produces two to six large flowers, typically around 4 inches in length. The colors of these flowers vary substantially from white to cream, pale yellow, or pale pink. The flowers have a lemon scent. Populations in northern Sikkim described by Pradhan & Lachungpa in Sikkim-Himalayan Rhododendrons (1990) were reported as uniformly lemon-green, leading to the designation of the subspecies R. dalhousiae var. tashii named after the Sikkimese botanist Tse Ten Tashi. A number of varietals, such as Rhododendron dalhousiae var. rhabdotum, were previously believed to be separate species, but have since been identified as a varietal and is considered vulnerable. It is closely related to Rhododendron lindleyi, although R. lindleyi has slightly smaller flowers and is highly fragrant. The flowers of var. rhabdotum are quite similar except for the five bright red stripes on each of the petals. In cultivation, var. rhabdotum typically flowers later (mid- to late-summer) than R. dalhousiae (late spring).

== Ecology ==
At the 2010 International Conference of Rhododendrons: Conservation and Sustainable Use, Hemant K. Badola suggested that Himalayan rhododendrons can act as a bellwether for climate change, particularly species with large and ostentatious blooms such as R. dalhousiae. Plant phenology, the discipline of the timing of recurring biological events, is significantly affected by seasonal environmental factors such as temperature and precipitation levels. R. dalhousiae, as weather-sensitive species, is an indicator species of a healthy forest, and may also be a candidate for phenological monitoring of global climate change.

== Uses ==
There are reports that the leave extract of R. dalhousiae var. rhabdotum is used as an insect repellent by the Monpa people in Arunachal Pradesh. Other sources suggest that an aqueous stem extract can be used for headache relief.

The book The Rhododendrons of Sikkim-Himalaya by British botanist Joseph Dalton Hooker featured Rhododendron dalhousiae on its frontispiece.
