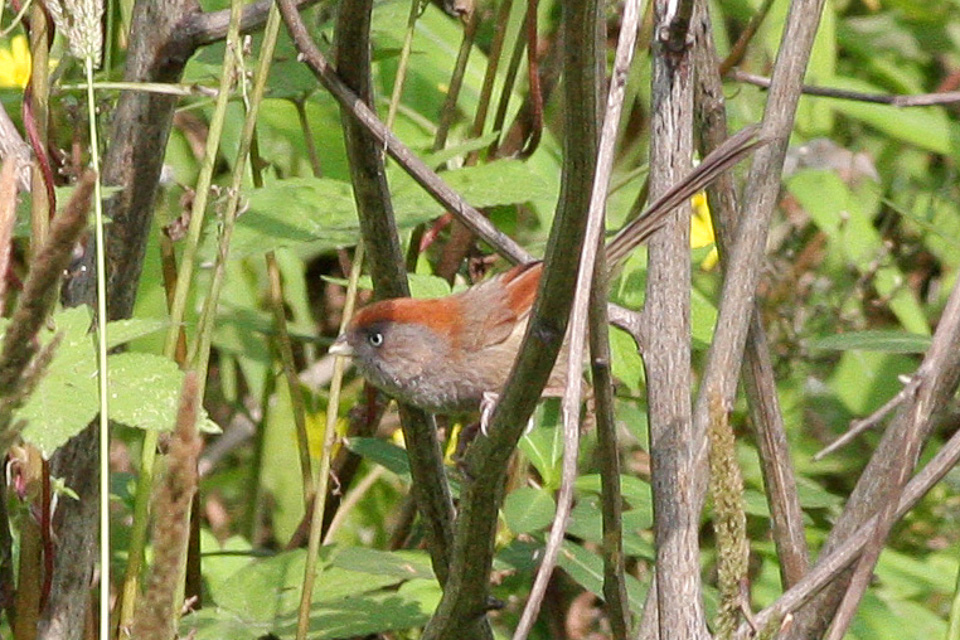

Conservation status
- Least Concern (IUCN 3.1)

Scientific classification
- Kingdom: Animalia
- Phylum: Chordata
- Class: Aves
- Order: Passeriformes
- Family: Paradoxornithidae
- Genus: Suthora
- Species: S. alphonsiana

Binomial name
- Suthora alphonsiana J. Verreaux, 1871
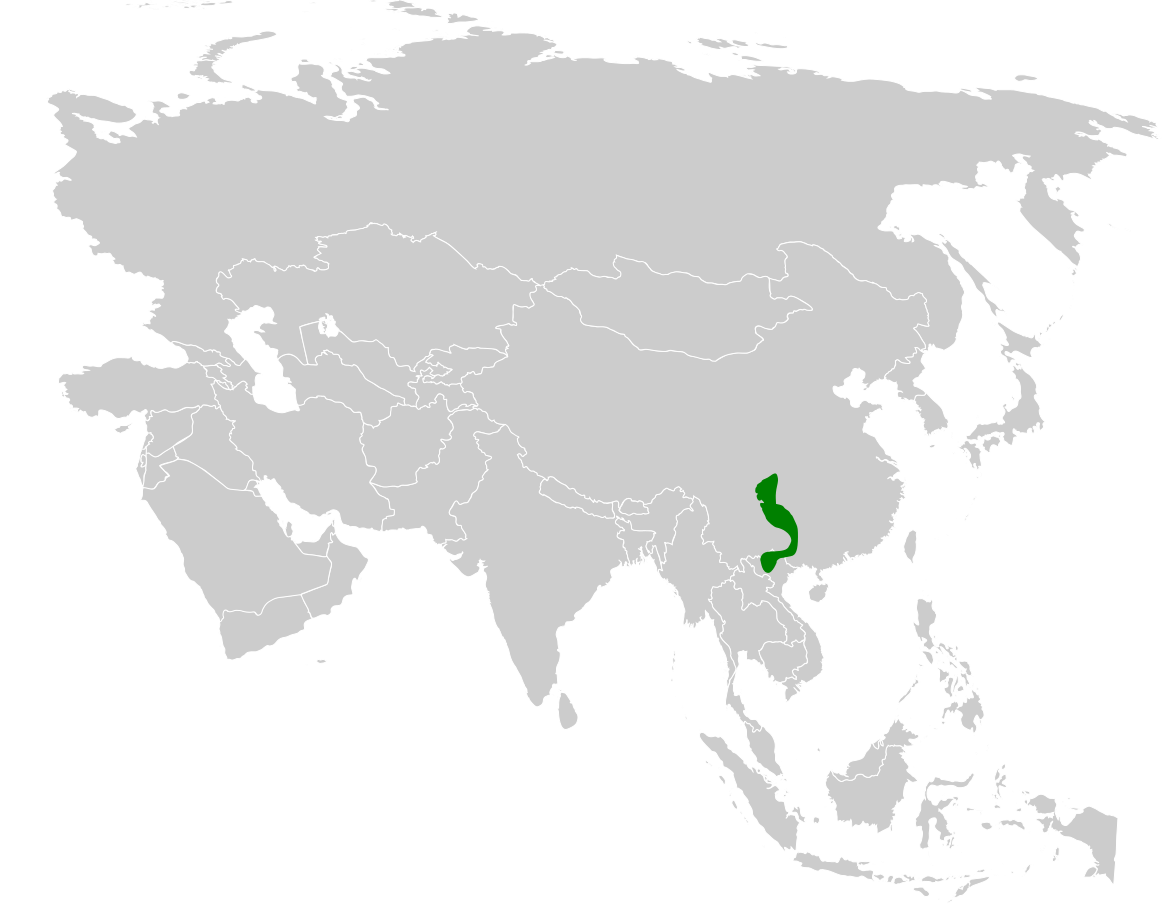

Synonyms
- Sinosuthora alphonsiana J. Verreaux, 1870; Paradoxornis alphonsianus

= Ashy-throated parrotbill =

Species of bird

The ashy-throated parrotbill (Suthora alphonsiana) is a parrotbill. In old sources, it may be called Alphonse's crow-tit; though superficially resembling a tit it is not a member of the Paridae. The native range of this species extends from south-west China to northern Vietnam, and it might have become naturalised in one area in Italy.

== Description and systematics ==
This is a medium-sized tawny-coloured parrotbill with the large bill typical of these birds. The specific epithet commemorates the French ornithologist Alphonse Milne-Edwards.

Formerly placed with the typical warblers (Sylvia) in the Sylviidae, the Old World babblers in the Timaliidae, or the tits and chickadees in the Paridae, they are now thought to belong to a distinct parrotbill family Paradoxornithidae.

They might be less close to the great parrotbill (Conostoma oemodium) than to Chrysomma, or to the fulvettas (Fulvetta) which were often included in the wastebin genus Alcippe. Another relative might be the wrentit (Chamaea fasciata), the only known American member of the Paradoxornithidae in the modern circumscription. The former two, and occasionally also the wrentit, were traditionally considered typical warblers or Old World babblers.

Together with the other lineages of parrotbills, these and the golden-breasted fulvetta (Lioparus chrysotis) and species in the genus Rhopophilus form an Asian counterpart to the westward radiation of the typical warblers. Rather than two genera – Paradoxornis and the monotypic Conostoma – the parrotbills are better considered several independent lineages which show pronounced convergent evolution, due to adaptation to reedbed habitat and a more granivorous diet than their skulking warbler-like ancestor. In this case, the ashy-throated parrotbill would probably be assigned to genus Sinoparadoxornis.

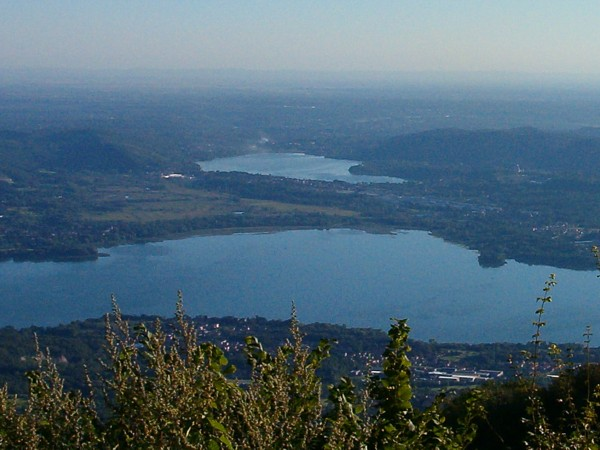
Lago di Varese (front) and Lago di Comabbio, with the Brabbia Swamp Nature Reserve left of center

== Possible naturalisation in Italy ==
A population of parrotbills was first discovered in northern Italy in 1995, at the Riserva naturale Palude Brabbia (Brabbia Swamp Nature Reserve), between Cazzago Brabbia on Lago di Varese and Varano Borghi on Lago di Comabbio. In March 1998, 21 individuals were captured and photographed, and provisionally identified as ashy-throated parrotbills. It is not entirely clear, however, whether the birds are indeed S. alphonsiana, its close relative the S. webbiana (vinous-throated parrotbill), both species, or even hybrids between them (as are known from their natural range). While they do not seem to be brown-winged parrotbills (S. brunnea, another close relative), certain identification to species may be impossible without analysis of both nDNA and mtDNA sequence data.

The population is believed to originate from birds escaping from a nearby bird-trader. By 1999, the number of birds in the swamp had grown to at least a hundred individuals; in December 1998, the parrotbills were also observed in two localities on the Lago di Varese. By the early 21st century, the birds are well-established as resident breeders. They are the only self-sustaining parrotbill population found in Europe, as it was discovered that the bearded reedling (Panurus biarmicus) – long believed to be an aberrant parrotbill – is actually a distinct lineage with no known relatives among the Passerida.

== Ecology ==
Contrary to their western Eurasian relatives (the typical warblers), these East Asian birds are small omnivores adapted to living in reed beds. In its native range, the ashy-throated parrotbill inhabits bamboo stands and areas with tall grasses. The parrotbills in Brabbia Swamp Nature Reserve inhabit common reed (Phragmites australis) beds and drier land overgrown with meadowsweet (Filipendula ulmaria), grey willow (Salix cinerea) and giant goldenrod (Solidago gigantea).

It feeds on arthropods, seeds and buds; in winter, the Italian birds seem to sustain themselves on insects that hibernate in reed stalks. As in its relatives in (sub)genus Sinoparadoxornis, its eggs are small by parrotbill standards, whitish- to light-blue and unspotted.

This bird will disappear if wetlands are drained, but its range is considerable and much of its habitat is remote and little accessed. It is thus considered a Species of Least Concern by the IUCN.
