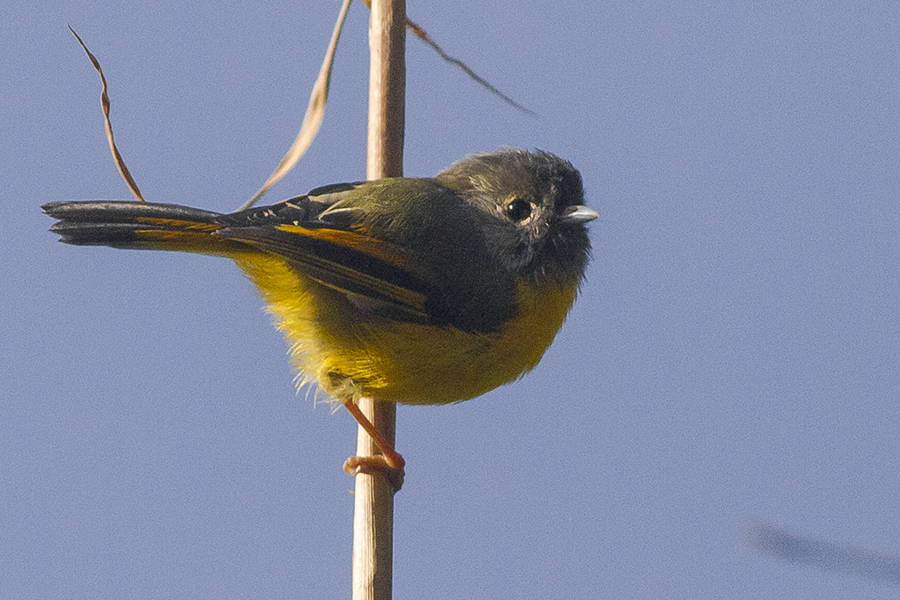
- Pangolakha WLS in East Sikkim, India.

Conservation status
- Least Concern (IUCN 3.1)

Scientific classification
- Kingdom: Animalia
- Phylum: Chordata
- Class: Aves
- Order: Passeriformes
- Family: Paradoxornithidae
- Genus: Lioparus; Oates, 1889
- Species: L. chrysotis

Binomial name
- Lioparus chrysotis (Blyth, 1845)

Synonyms
- Proparus chrysaeus; Alcippe chrysaea

= Golden-breasted fulvetta =

Golden-breasted "fulvetta"

Species of songbird

The golden-breasted fulvetta (Lioparus chrysotis) is a species of songbird found in Bhutan, China, India, Myanmar, Nepal, and Vietnam. Its natural habitats are temperate forests and subtropical or tropical moist montane forests.

== Taxonomy ==
- - Sylvia
  - - Myzornis
    - - Moupinia
      - - Lioparus
        - - - - Chrysomma
              - - Rhopophilus
                - Fulvetta
          - - - Chamaea
              - - Paradoxornis
                - - - Conostoma
                    - Cholornis
                  - Psittiparus
            - - - Suthora
                - Neosuthora
              - - Chleuasicus
                - Sinosuthora

Phylogenetic position of the genus Lioparus

When Edward Blyth first described the golden-breasted fulvetta in 1845, from a written description provided by naturalist Brian Houghton Hodgson of a specimen collected in Nepal, he gave it the scientific name Proparus chrysotis. (Note: Though the journal in which the description appeared is dated 1844, there is substantial evidence that its publishing was delayed until 1845.) Most ornithologists kept it in that genus until 1889, when Eugene William Oates created the genus Lioparus and named the golden-breasted fulvetta as its type species and sole member. He moved the species out of the genus Proparus because it had a broader bill, much longer rictal bristles (bristles hanging over the nostrils) and smaller hind claws than other species in the genus. There are six recognized subspecies:

- L. c. chrysotis, the nominate subspecies, is found from central Nepal east to northeastern India (western Arunachal Pradesh) and adjacent southern China (southeastern Tibet). This has a grey chin and throat with silvery white tips to the feathers, a coal grey head and either lacking or having a narrow white median crown or coronal stripe. Some Sikkim specimens have a grey coronal stripe.
- L. c. albilineatus, described by Walter Koelz in 1954, is found in Assam, Nagaland and Manipur in northeastern India. Said to have a prominent white coronal stripe and brighter plumage.
- L. c. forresti, described by Walter Rothschild in 1926, is found in northeastern Myanmar and northwestern Yunnan (in southern China). They have the coronal stripe made up of white spots which are yellowish towards the nape. It is named after the collector of the type specimen, George Forrest.
- L. c. swinhoii, described by Jules Pierre Verreaux in 1871, is found in China from southeastern Gansu, southern Shaanxi and central Sichuan south to Guangxi, southeastern Hunan and northern Guangdong.
- L. c. amoenus, described by Ernst Walter Mayr in 1941, is found in southeastern Yunnan and Tonkin in northwestern Vietnam.
- L. c. robsoni, described by J. C. Eames in 2002, is found in central Vietnam. It has a yellow throat and chin, an off-white central crown stripe and olive-grey ear coverts.

== Description ==
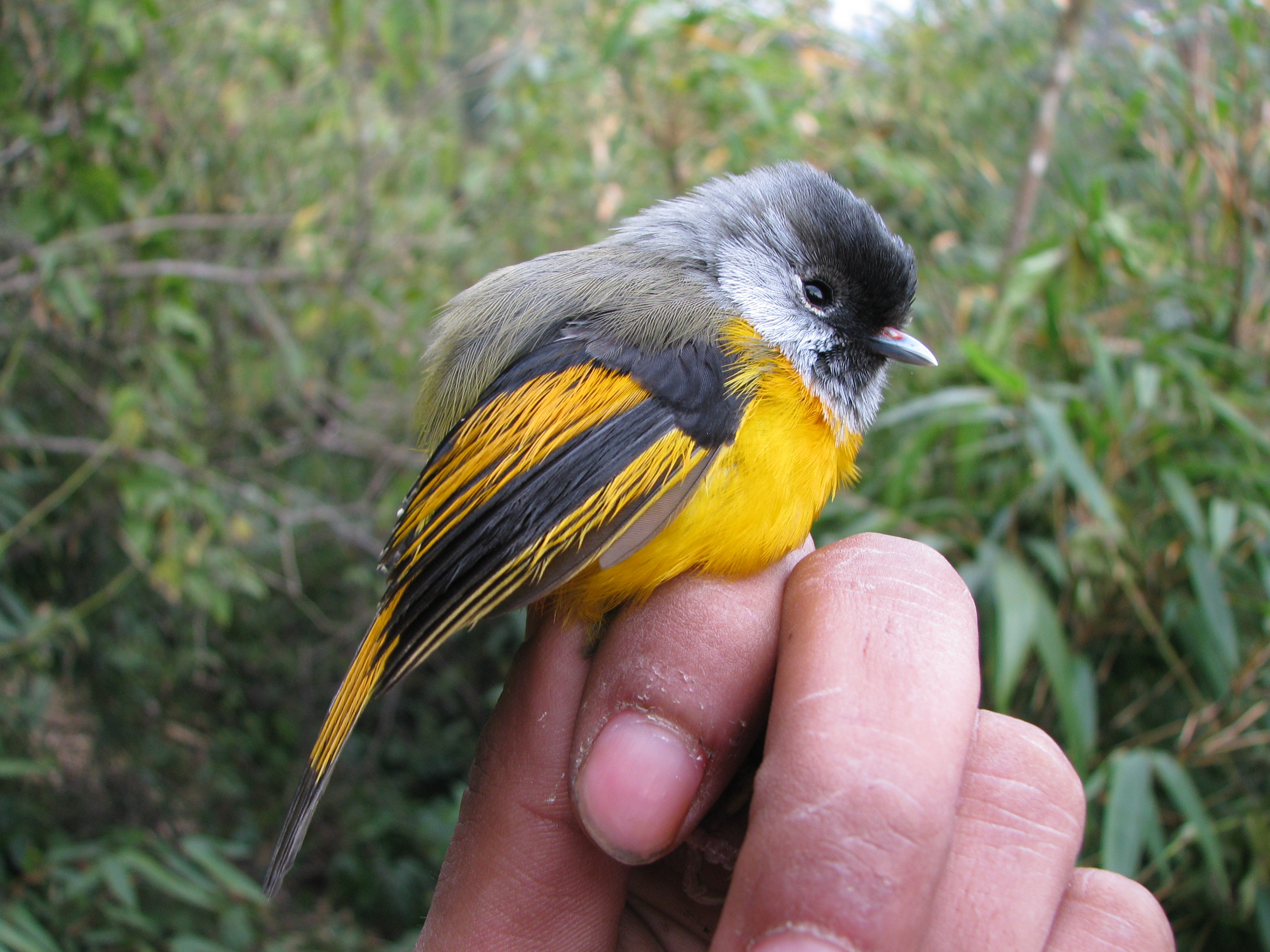
From Eaglenest Wildlife Sanctuary, Arunachal Pradesh.

The golden-breasted fulvetta is a small bird, measuring 10–11.5 cm (3.9–4.5 in) in length (Note: By convention, length is measured from the tip of the bill to the tip of the tail on a dead bird (or skin) laid on its back.) with a mass between 5 and 10 g (0.18 and 0.35 oz). The head and crown are black or grey and the black wings have orange-yellow slashes. The secondaries are tipped white and brown tail has two thirds of the base edged in orange yellow. The underparts are predominantly yellow and the throat may be grey or yellowish depending on the populations. The presence, prominence and colour of the median crown stripe varies with populations. The sexes are indistinguishable by plumage.

== Range and habitat ==
The golden-breasted fulvetta is found from central Nepal through Bhutan, northern India and Myanmar to western China and northern Vietnam. It is an altitudinal migrant, moving from breeding grounds at 2,000–2,800 m (6,600–9,200 ft) to foothills as low as 1,600 m (5,200 ft), and occasionally down to 1,300 m (4,300 ft), in the winter.

Golden-breasted fulvettas are found in broad-leaved evergreen forests and montane bamboo where they forage at a low height for insects, moving in groups of as many as 30 individuals in winter, and often joining mixed-species foraging flocks.

== Conservation and threats ==
The International Union for Conservation of Nature (IUCN) lists the golden-breasted fulvetta as a species of least concern. Although its population has not been quantified and is thought to be declining, the decline is not thought to be precipitous, and its overall range is vast. In recent times, there has been growing pressure on some populations, with people collecting them as a food source or as pets.

Several species of feather mite have been described from specimens of the golden-breasted fulvetta including Timalinyssus grallator, Neocalcealges chrysotis, Anhemialge lioparus and Resartor extraneus from China.
