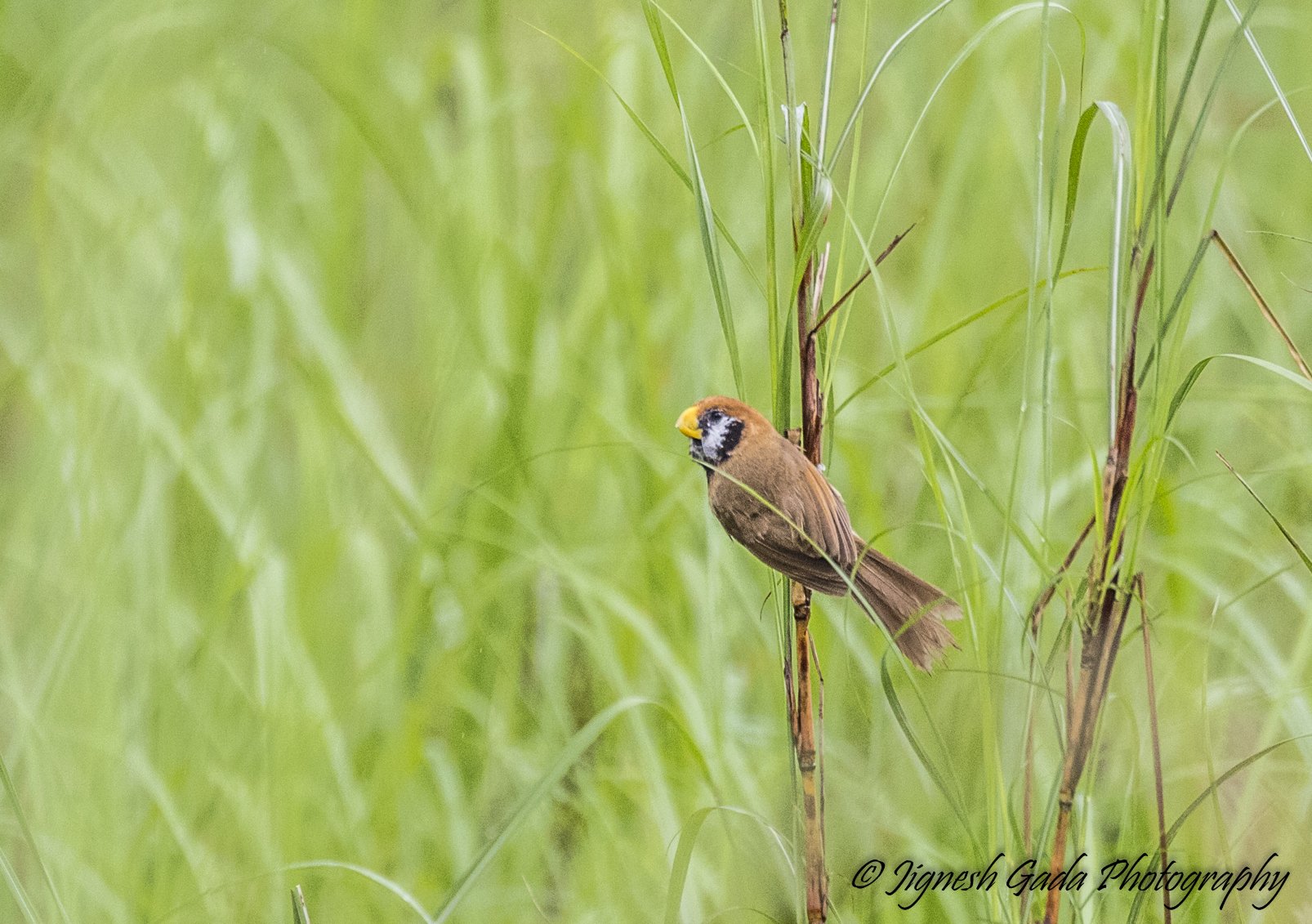
- Manas National Park, Assam, India

Conservation status
- Vulnerable (IUCN 3.1)

Scientific classification
- Kingdom: Animalia
- Phylum: Chordata
- Class: Aves
- Order: Passeriformes
- Family: Paradoxornithidae
- Genus: Paradoxornis
- Species: P. flavirostris

Binomial name
- Paradoxornis flavirostris Gould, 1836

= Black-breasted parrotbill =

Species of bird

The black-breasted parrotbill (Paradoxornis flavirostris) is a 19 cm (7.5 in) long, large, thick-billed parrotbill with black patches on the head-sides and throat. Formerly placed in the family Sylviidae, the parrotbills are now considered a distinct family, the Paradoxornithidae, following Cai et al. (2019).

== Description ==
The bird is more or less brown all over, with an extensive black area on upper breast and uniform rufous-buff remainder of underparts. The similar spot-breasted parrotbill, a close relative, has arrow-shaped spotting on breast and pale buff underparts. The voice is a gruff howh, jeehw or jahw, the song a rhythmic series, aw jahw jahw jahw and uhwi uhwi uhwi uhwi. Alternatively, a higher-pitched wi chi'chi'chi'chi'chi, wi yi'yi'yi'yi'yi; wi'uwi-uwi-uwi wi chu-chu-chu is given.

== Distribution and habitat ==
Paradoxornis flavirostris is now very probably endemic to north-eastern India, where it is known from only five widely scattered localities in the plains of the Brahmaputra valley and adjacent foothills: Manas National Park and its surrounds, Kaziranga National Park (where it is rather scarce), Loktak Lake and adjacent marshes in Manipur, the species' stronghold around Dibru-Saikhowa National Park and D'Ering Memorial Wildlife Sanctuary in the Tinsukia–East Siang area, and grasslands of the Lower Dibang Valley in Arunachal Pradesh. It may also persist in the chapories (riverine islands) of the Lohit River. Historically it was much more widespread in northern India, extending west into West Bengal as far as Gorumara National Park (no records since 1984) and south into Bangladesh in at least two areas, where it is now considered possibly extinct. Sometimes quoted as occurring in eastern Nepal, but this is unconfirmed.

The species inhabits dense reed thickets and mixed tall grassland dominated by Phragmites karka and Arundo donax, predominantly on wet substrates along lowland river floodplains and in adjacent grassy forest clearings. It was formerly found up to at least 900 m but is now restricted to the plains, with an upper elevation limit of about 150 m. It is generally found in small flocks except during the breeding season (April–July), and is presumably resident although there is some indication of local seasonal movements in response to the rainy season.

== Conservation status ==
The black-breasted parrotbill has been listed as Vulnerable on the IUCN Red List continuously since 1994, with the 2024 reassessment (version 2024-2) reaffirming this category under criteria B2ab(ii,iii,iv,v) and C2a(i). The 2024 assessment estimates an extent of occurrence of 95,500 km², an area of occupancy of 500 km², and 5–20 known locations.

=== Population ===
The global population is estimated at 1,500–4,000 mature individuals, distributed across four to five subpopulations and inferred to be declining. No single subpopulation is thought to exceed 500–1,000 mature individuals. The largest is hosted by D'Ering Wildlife Sanctuary, with the Lower Dibang Valley and Manas National Park each potentially holding several hundred birds, while the isolated population around Loktak Lake (mostly within Keibul Lamjao National Park) is probably fewer than 250 individuals.

=== Threats ===
The main threat is loss and degradation of tall grasslands. Unprotected areas, mainly in Arunachal Pradesh, are subject to encroachment for rice paddies, mustard and tea plantations, illegal grazing, and harvesting of grass for thatch. Inappropriate grassland management within protected areas is also a concern. Extreme flooding events in the Brahmaputra valley, associated with rapid run-off from an increasingly denuded catchment, could damage grasslands, and proposed dam construction in the foothills of Arunachal Pradesh could alter flow conditions important to the species. The State of India's Birds 2023 assessment identifies it as among the country's grassland specialists of high conservation concern.

=== Conservation actions ===
The species occurs in five protected areas: Kaziranga, Manas and Dibru-Saikhowa National Parks, D'Ering Wildlife Sanctuary and Keibul Lamjao National Park. A sixth protected area in the Lower Dibang Valley was reportedly approved by the State Board for Wildlife in 2018 but remains formally undeclared. Twenty-two Important Bird Areas have been identified for the species, covering a network of about 8,861 km². Recommended actions include range-wide surveys to refine the population estimate, lobbying for protection of further suitable grasslands either as national parks or community reserves, and awareness campaigns promoting sustainable thatch management that also maintains habitat for threatened grassland birds.

== Gallery ==
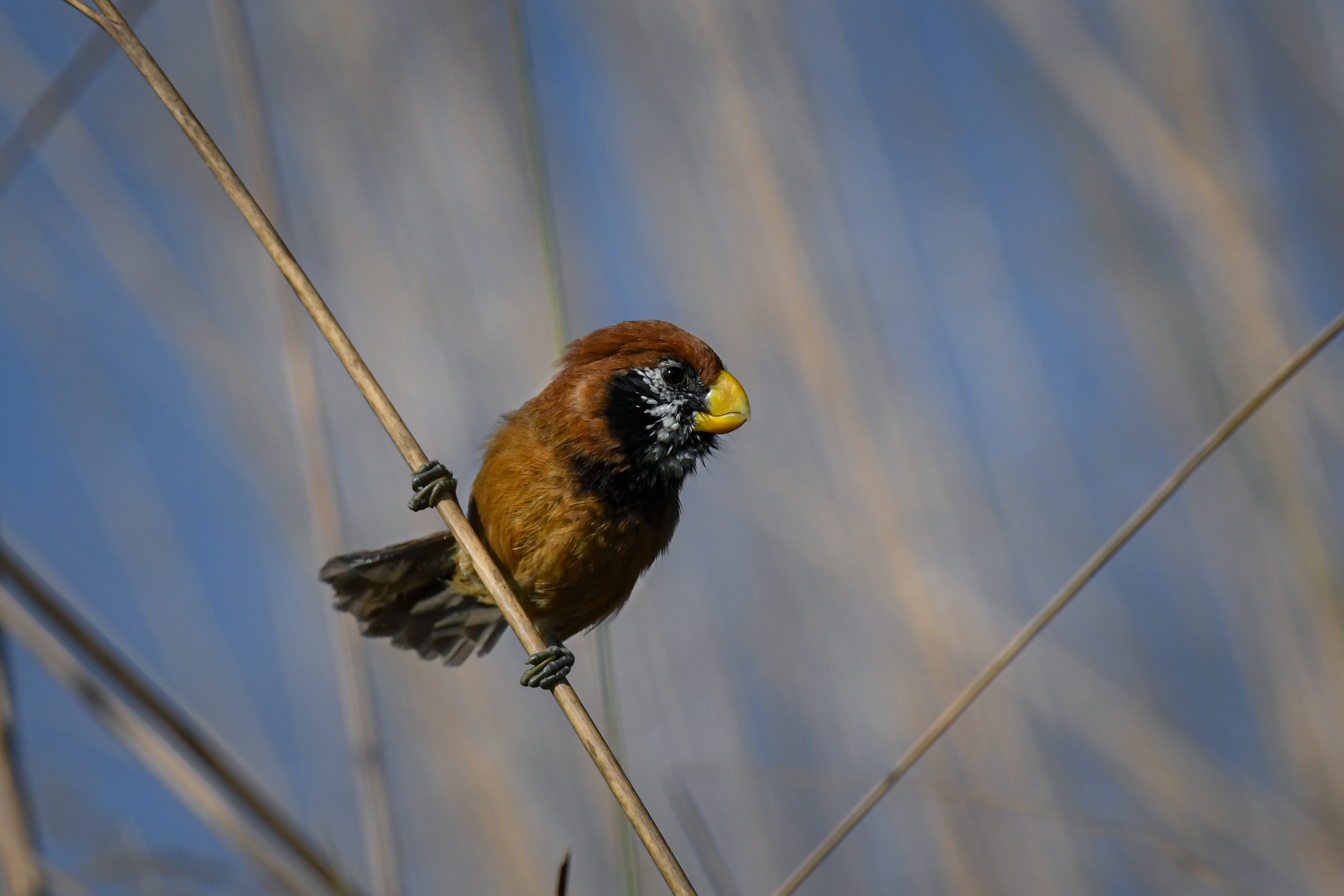
Black-breasted parrotbill at Tinsukia, Assam, India

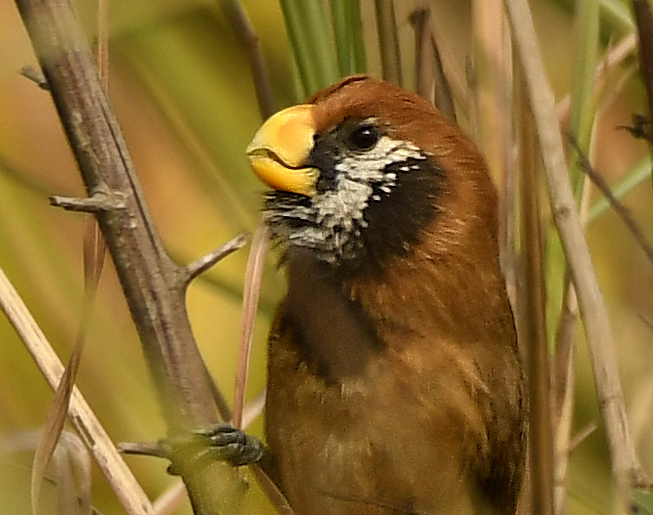
Black-breasted parrotbill at Manas National Park, Assam, India

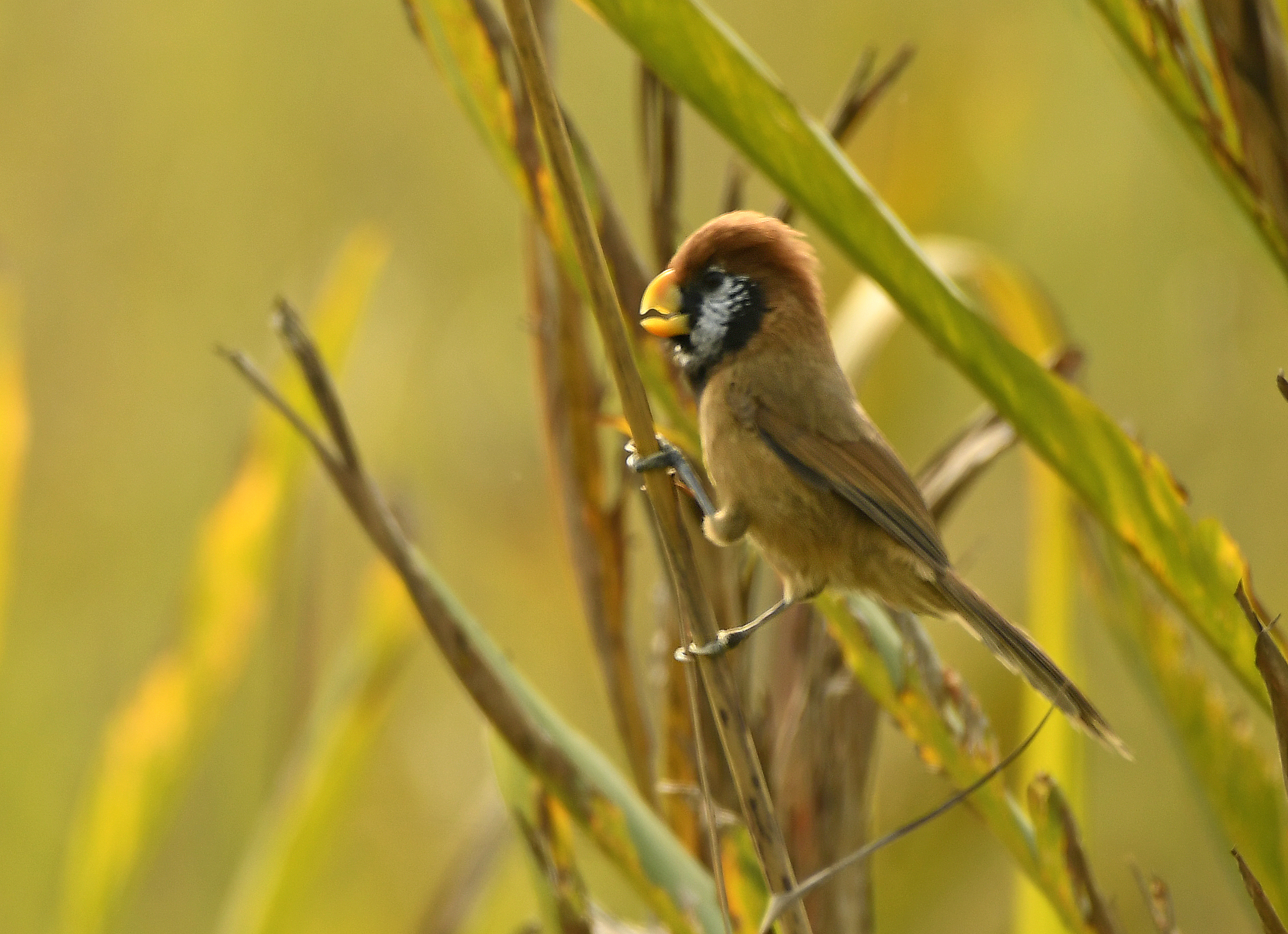
Black-breasted parrotbill at Manas National Park, Assam, India
