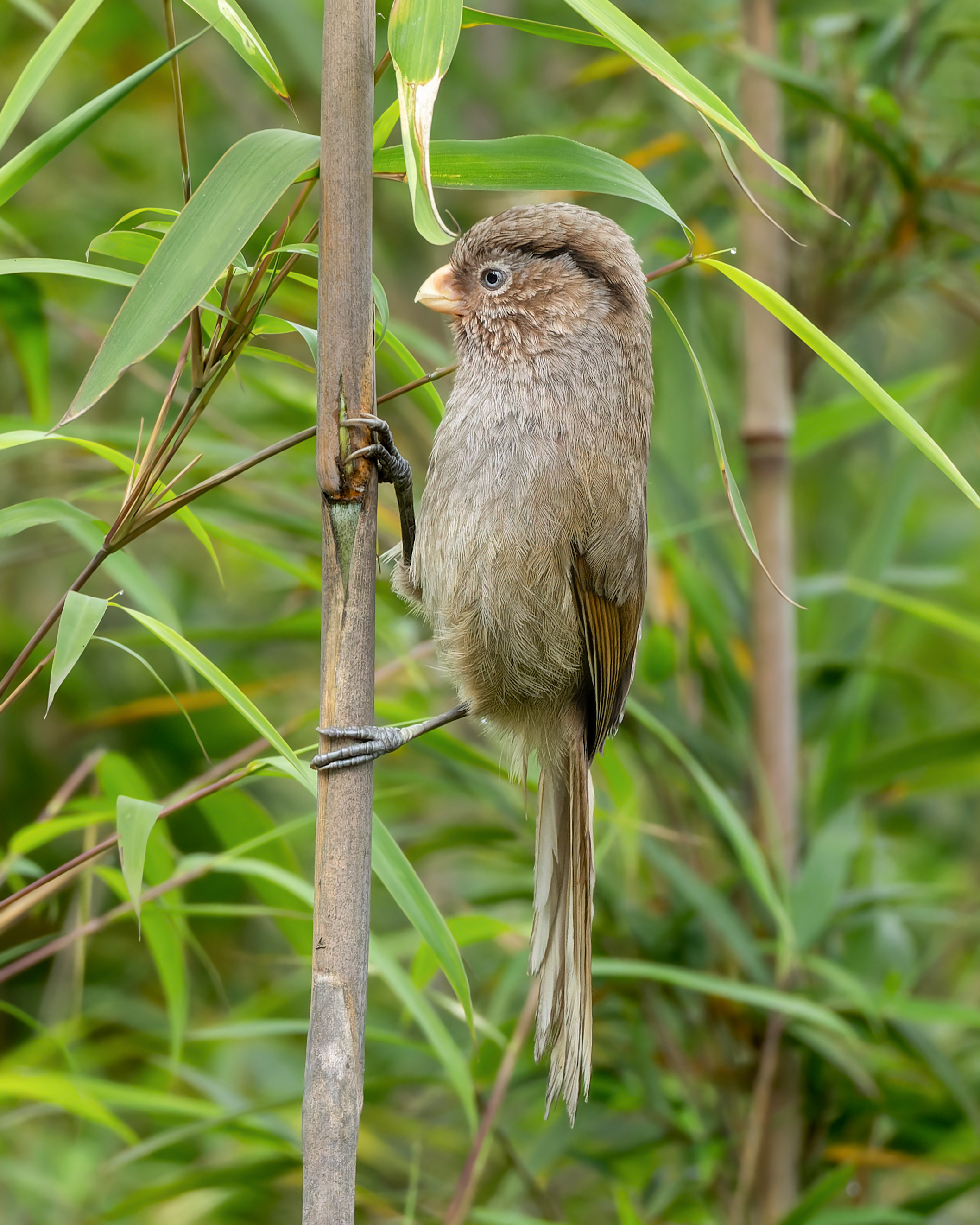
- In Darjeeling, West Bengal, India.

Conservation status
- Least Concern (IUCN 3.1)

Scientific classification
- Kingdom: Animalia
- Phylum: Chordata
- Class: Aves
- Order: Passeriformes
- Family: Paradoxornithidae
- Genus: Paradoxornis
- Species: P. unicolor

Binomial name
- Paradoxornis unicolor (Hodgson, 1843)

Synonyms
- Cholornis unicolor (Hodgson, 1843); Heteromorpha unicolor Hodgson, 1843

= Brown parrotbill =

Species of bird

The brown parrotbill (Paradoxornis unicolor) is a bird found in the central and eastern Himalayas. It is also known as the brown suthora. This is a grey-brown bird 17–19 cm (6.7–7.5 in) long with a long tail and a characteristic small, yellowish, parrot-like bill. A dark stripe runs above the eyes and along the sides of the crown. The bird moves in small groups and will sometimes join mixed species foraging flocks. It is found in Bhutan, China, India, Myanmar, and Nepal.

It breeds in bamboo and rhododendron scrub at altitudes of 2,700–3,400 m (8,900–11,200 ft), with some altitudinal migration down to 2,000 m (6,600 ft) in winter.

It was originally described by Brian Houghton Hodgson in the genus Hemirhynchus, this species was later moved to the genus Heteromorpha. It is now usually treated as a member of the family Paradoxornithidae, where its closest relative is the three-toed parrotbill. It is currently considered monotypic; two named subspecies, P. u. canaster, described by Thayer and Bangs in 1912 from Hsikang, and P. u. saturatior, described by Rothschild in 1921 from Yunnan, are generally not considered valid.

== Gallery ==
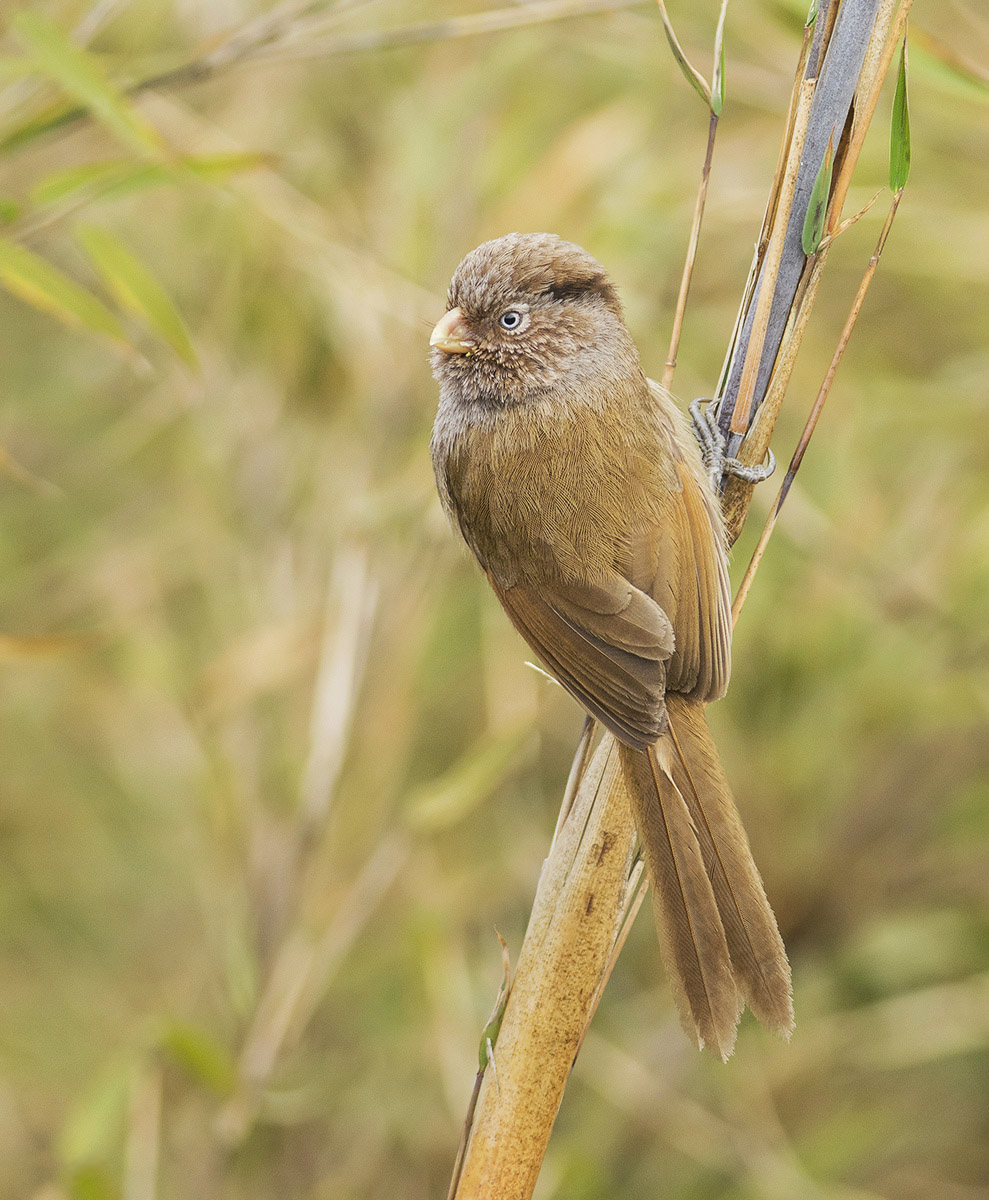
At Singalila National Park, West Bengal, India

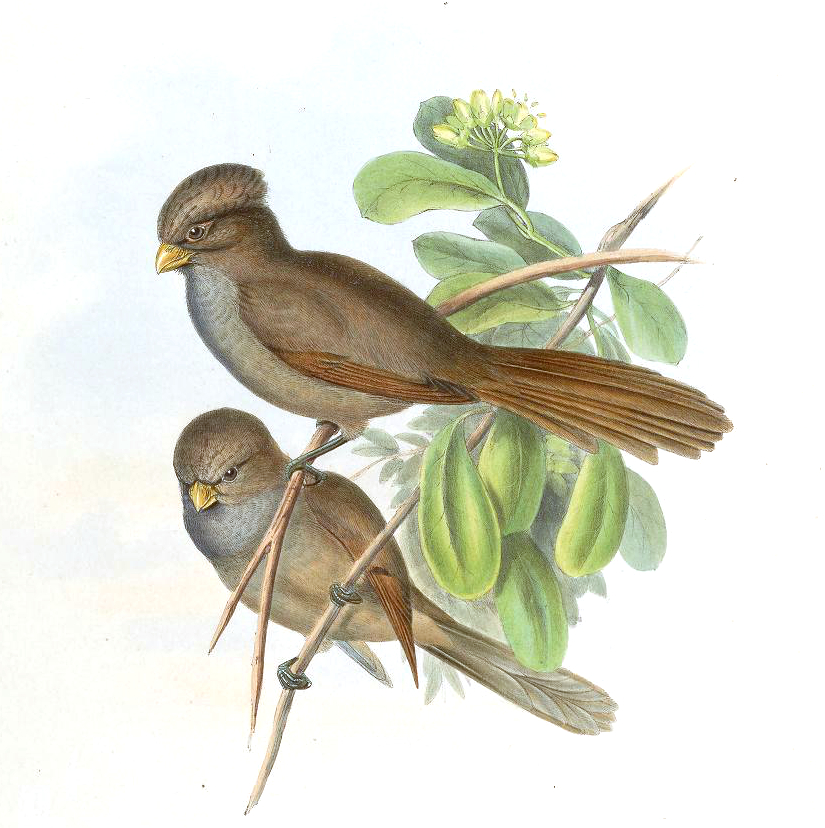
Illustration by John Gould
