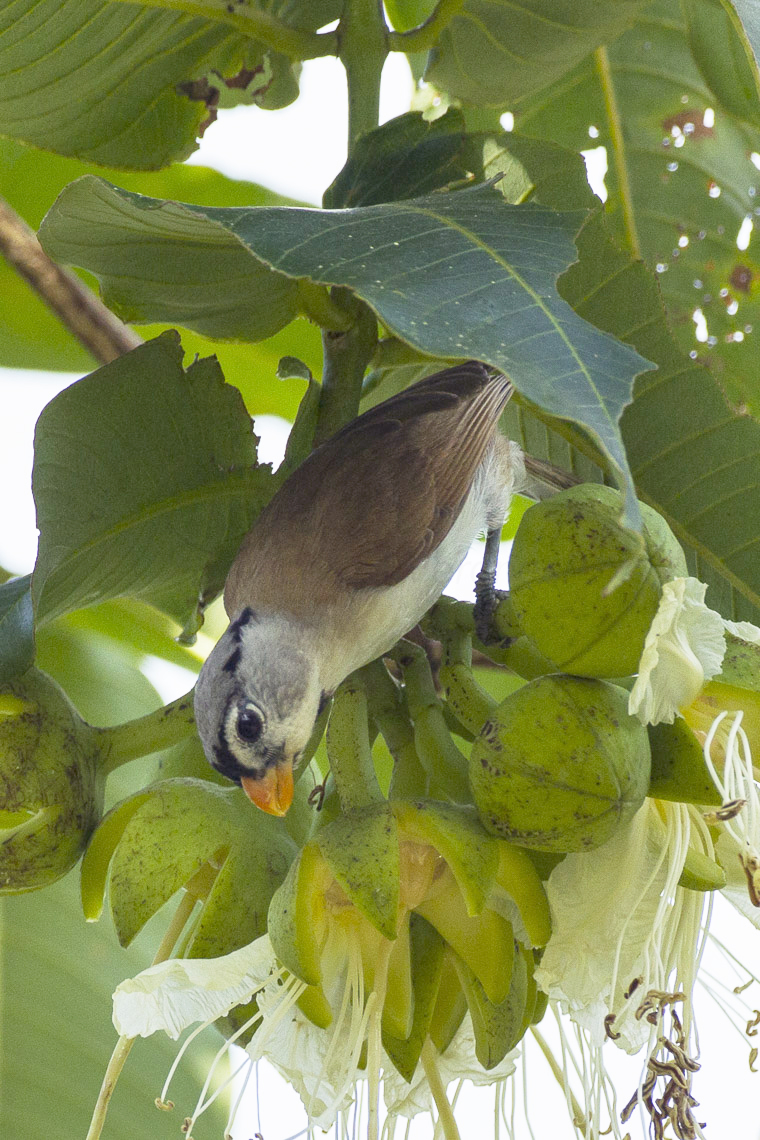
- Chiang Mai, Thailand

Conservation status
- Least Concern (IUCN 3.1)

Scientific classification
- Kingdom: Animalia
- Phylum: Chordata
- Class: Aves
- Order: Passeriformes
- Family: Paradoxornithidae
- Genus: Paradoxornis
- Species: P. gularis

Binomial name
- Paradoxornis gularis Gray, GR, 1845

Synonyms
- Psittiparus gularis

= Grey-headed parrotbill =

Species of bird

The grey-headed parrotbill (Paradoxornis gularis) is a bird in the family Paradoxornithidae and is found in eastern Asia from the Himalayas to Indochina and Hainan.

== Taxonomy and systematics ==
The grey-headed parrotbill was alternatively considered as a member of the family Timaliidae or with the Sylviidae, but is now classified in the distinct family Paradoxornithidae by the IOC. Until 2008, the black-headed parrotbill was also considered as a subspecies of the grey-headed parrotbill.

== Distribution and habitat ==
The natural habitat of the grey-headed parrotbill is subtropical or tropical moist montane forests.
