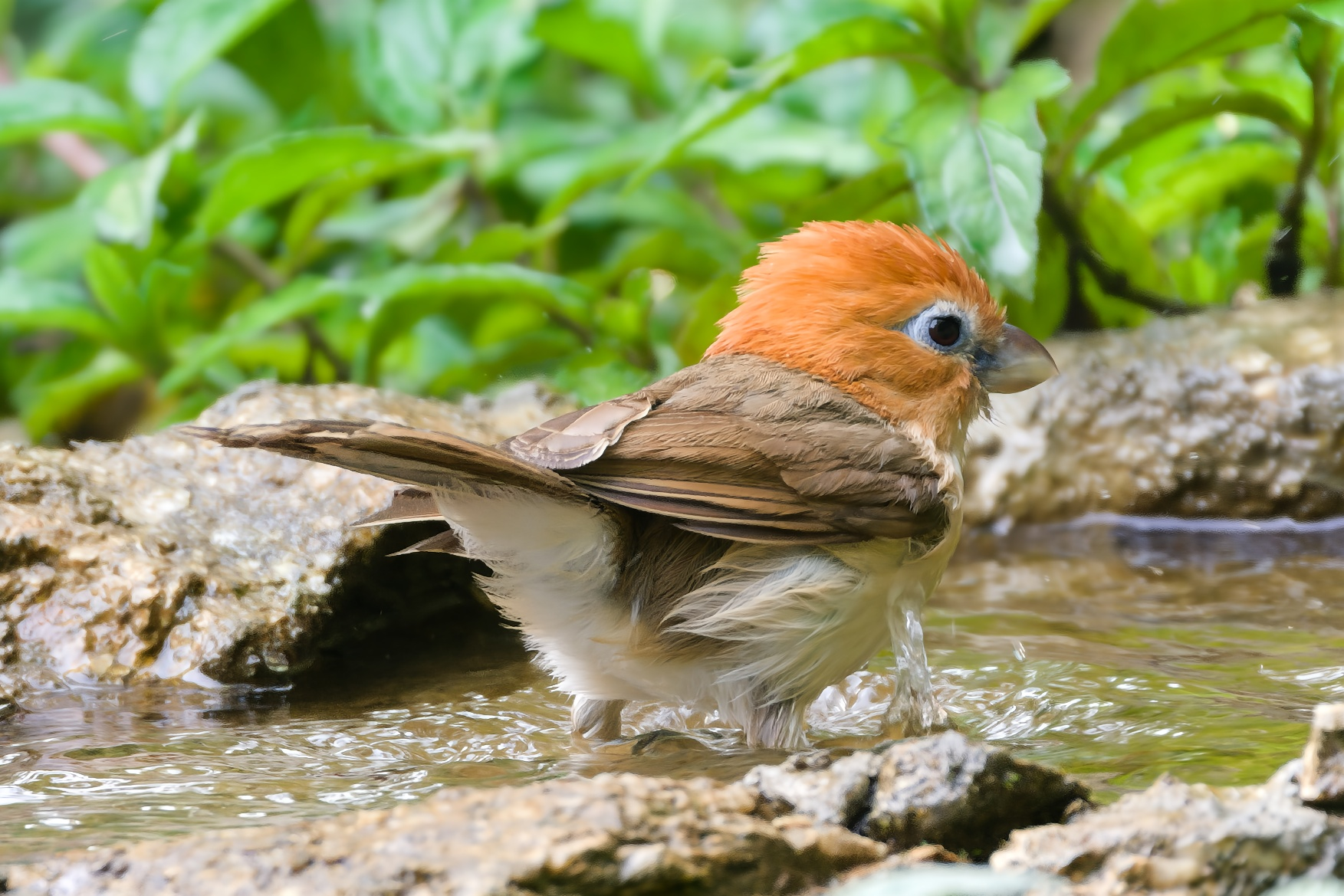
- In Yingjiang County, Yunnan Province, China

Conservation status
- Least Concern (IUCN 3.1)

Scientific classification
- Kingdom: Animalia
- Phylum: Chordata
- Class: Aves
- Order: Passeriformes
- Family: Paradoxornithidae
- Genus: Paradoxornis
- Species: P. bakeri

Binomial name
- Paradoxornis bakeri (Hartert, 1900)

Synonyms
- Psittiparus bakeri

= Rufous-headed parrotbill =

Species of bird

The rufous-headed parrotbill (Paradoxornis bakeri), or greater rufous-headed parrotbill, is a bird in the family Paradoxornithidae and is found in eastern Asia from the eastern Himalayas to Indochina.

== Taxonomy and systematics ==
The rufous-headed parrotbill was alternatively considered as a member of the family Timaliidae, or in the Sylviidae, but it actually seems to belong to the distinct family Paradoxornithidae. It was formerly considered as conspecific with the white-breasted parrotbill.

== Distribution and habitat ==
The natural habitats of the rufous-headed parrotbill are subtropical or tropical moist lowland forests and subtropical or tropical moist montane forests.
