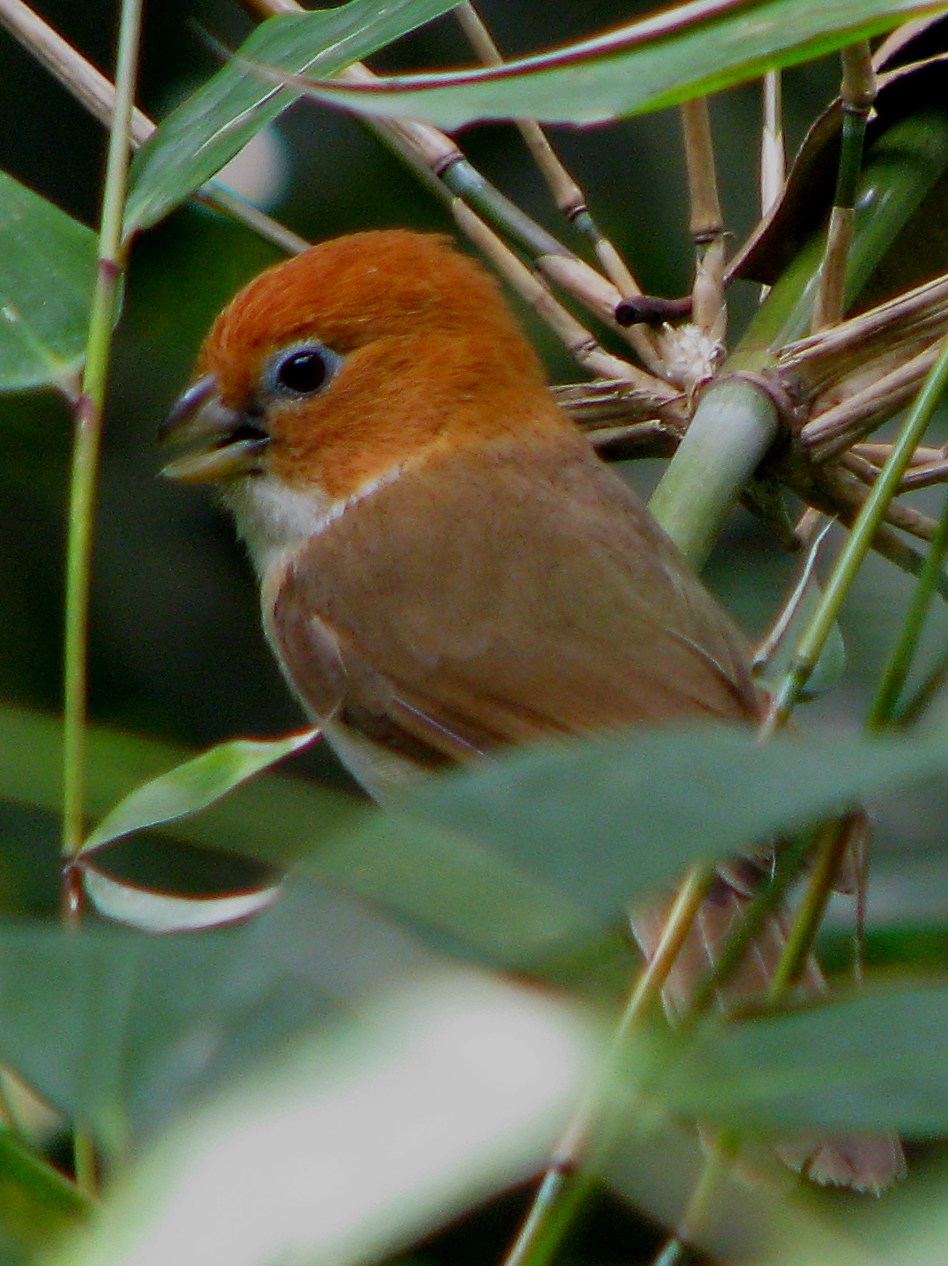
- In Eaglenest Wildlife Sanctuary, Arunachal Pradesh, India

Conservation status
- Least Concern (IUCN 3.1)

Scientific classification
- Kingdom: Animalia
- Phylum: Chordata
- Class: Aves
- Order: Passeriformes
- Family: Paradoxornithidae
- Genus: Paradoxornis
- Species: P. ruficeps

Binomial name
- Paradoxornis ruficeps Blyth, 1842

Synonyms
- Psittiparus ruficeps

= White-breasted parrotbill =

Species of bird

The white-breasted parrotbill (Paradoxornis ruficeps) is a bird species often placed with the Old World babblers (family Timaliidae) or in a distinct family Paradoxornithidae, but it actually seems to belong to the Sylviidae.

It is found in Eastern Himalaya, Myanmar, Laos and Vietnam. Its natural habitats are subtropical or tropical moist lowland forests and subtropical or tropical moist montane forests.

It was formerly considered conspecific with the rufous-headed parrotbill.
