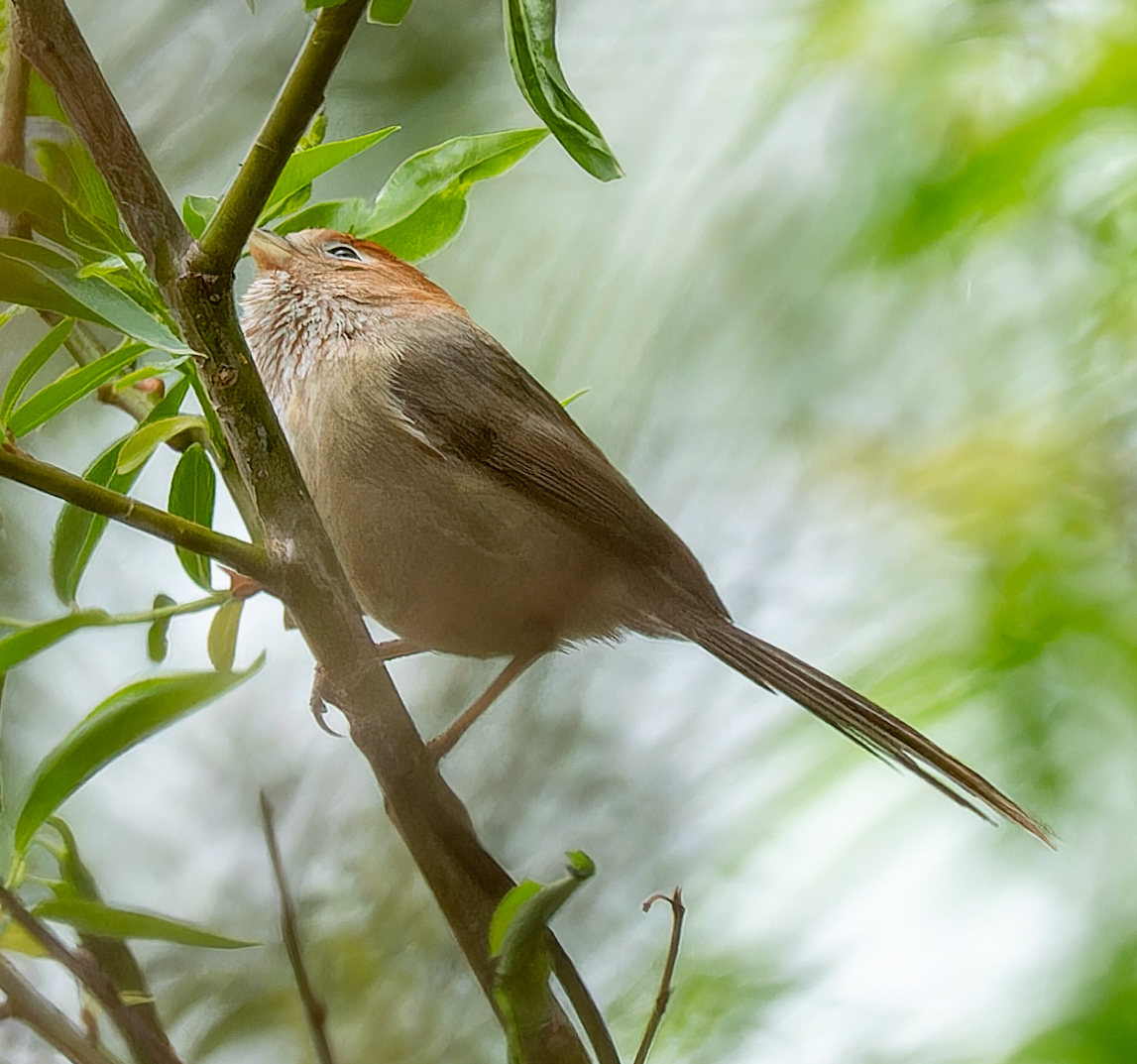

Conservation status
- Least Concern (IUCN 3.1)

Scientific classification
- Kingdom: Animalia
- Phylum: Chordata
- Class: Aves
- Order: Passeriformes
- Family: Paradoxornithidae
- Genus: Suthora
- Species: S. ricketti

Binomial name
- Suthora ricketti (Rothschild, 1922)

Synonyms
- Paradoxornis brunneus ricketti Sinosuthora brunneus ricketti

= Eye-ringed parrotbill =

Subspecies of bird

The eye-ringed parrotbill (Suthora ricketti), also known as the Yunnan parrotbill, is a species of bird in the family Paradoxornithidae. This 10 cm long parrotbill is endemic to China, breeding in northwest Yunnan.

It was formerly considered conspecific with the brown-winged parrotbill Suthora brunnea, (sometimes the vinous-throated parrotbill, Suthora webbiana), but more recent studies have found it to be a distinct species. Its behaviour is described as similar to that of vinous-throated.
