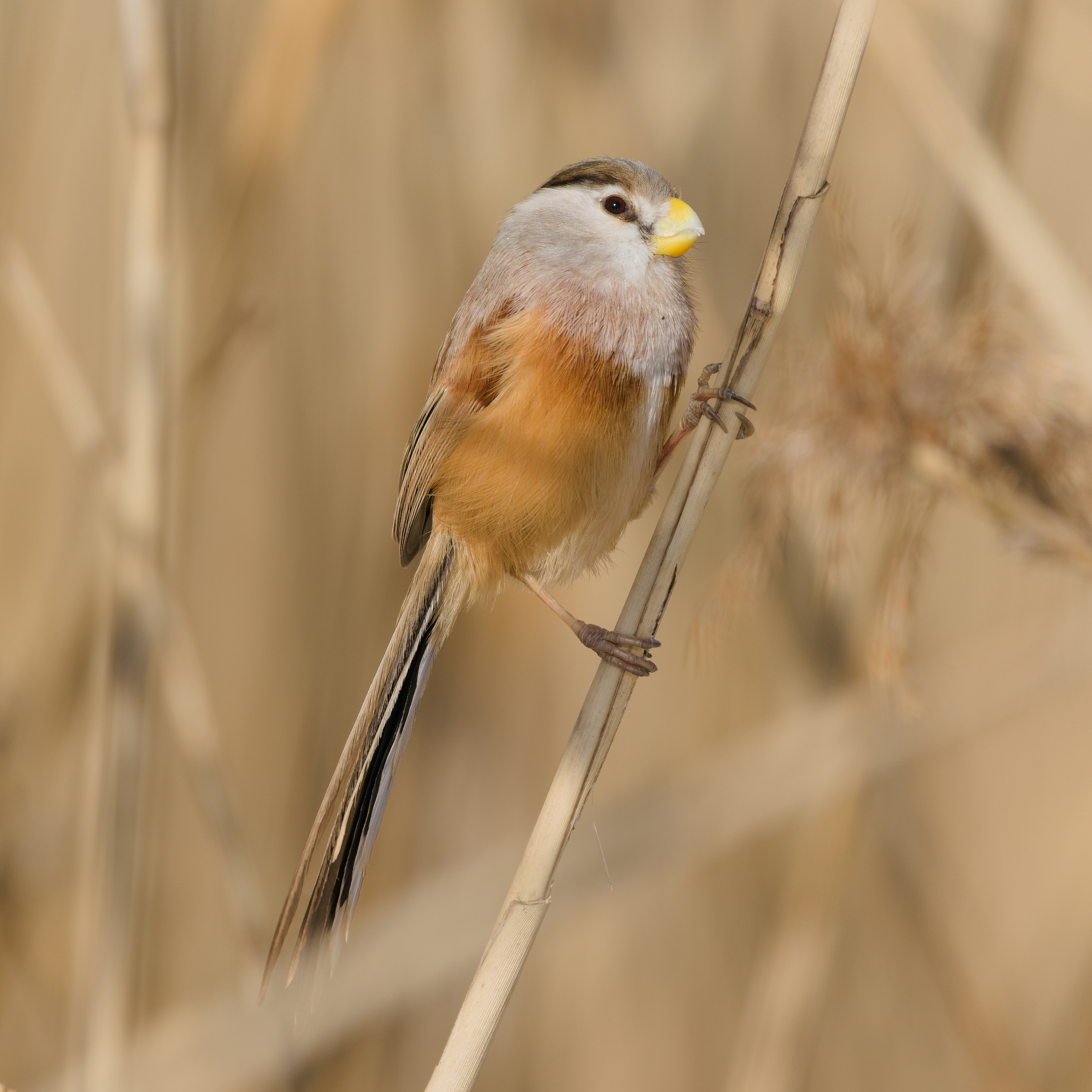

Conservation status
- Near Threatened (IUCN 3.1)

Scientific classification
- Kingdom: Animalia
- Phylum: Chordata
- Class: Aves
- Order: Passeriformes
- Family: Paradoxornithidae
- Genus: Paradoxornis
- Species: P. heudei

Binomial name
- Paradoxornis heudei David, A, 1872

Synonyms
- Calamornis heudei

= Reed parrotbill =

Species of bird

The reed parrotbill (Paradoxornis heudei) is a species of bird in the family Paradoxornithidae. It is found in Manchuria and eastern China and the Russian Far East. It is threatened by habitat loss.

The northern subspecies P. h. polivanovi is sometimes regarded as a separate species, the northern parrotbill.

== Description ==
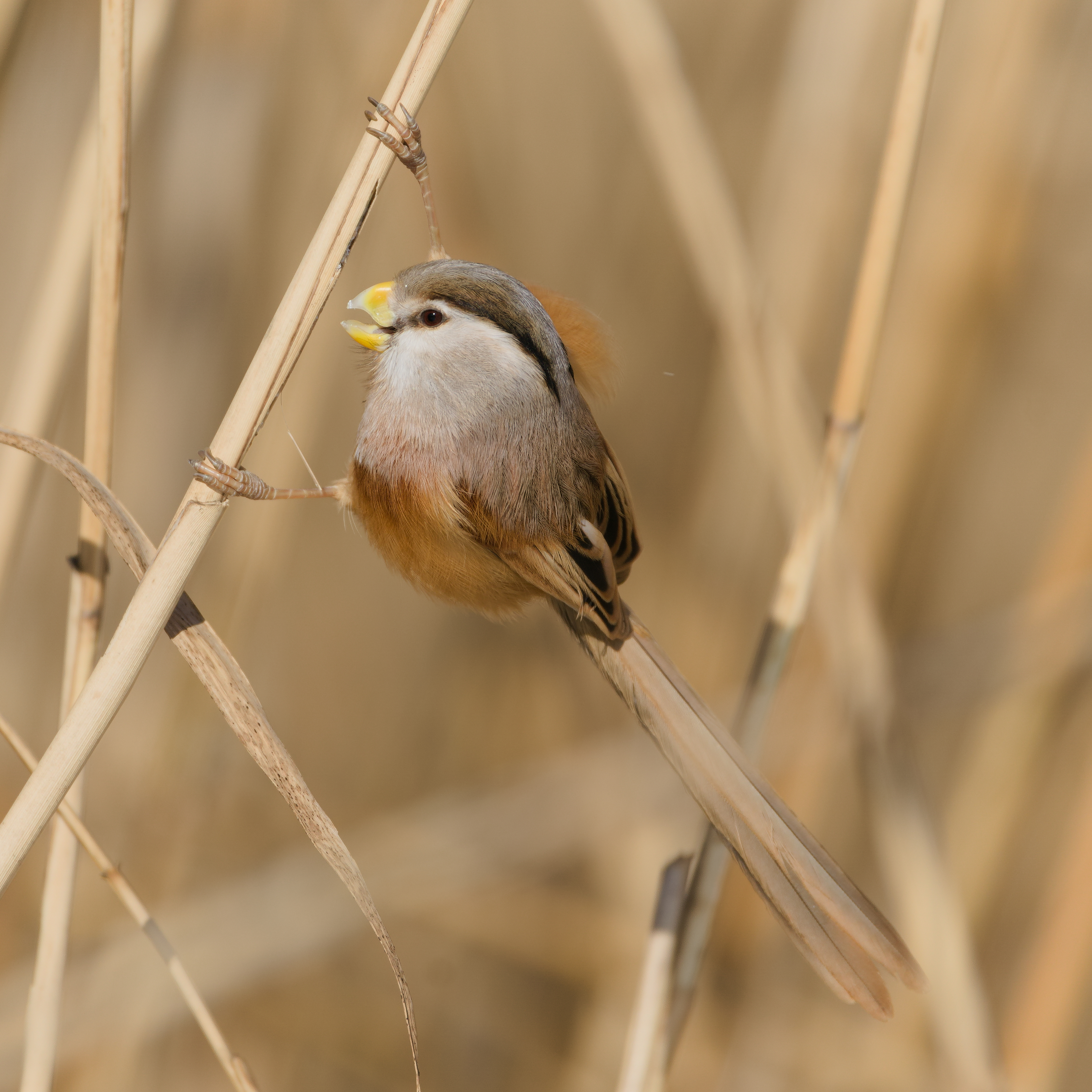
In Beijing

The reed parrotbill species is known to have significantly short, wide, and deep bills. The reed parrotbill is the only parrotbill to change its appearance based on whether it's in breeding season. In winter, non-breeding season, the reed parrotbill has a pinkish-cream and ash-gray forehead and neck. This species has streaks of black and warm brown from above its eyes to the tip of its head. The region between its eyes and bill is a little whiter than its forehead. The reed parrotbill has a white-tinted stripe that runs from the base of the bird's beak above its eye, and finishes somewhere towards the rear of the bird's head. Its ears are a similar color to its crown, also known as the top of its head. They have different colored streaks on their body which include black and brown. The streaks become blacker the further down the body. In summer, breeding season, the top of the birds head to the feathers in the upper middle of the back below the neck feathers, are a bluish-gray. The lower end of the feathers are more of a dark chestnut. Their ears are slightly paler, and the sides are a lighter chestnut color than they are in non-breeding season.

== Habitat ==
Reed parrotbills are native to East Asia. Their habitat is known as a reedbed, which is a very wet area of reed plants between water and land. Reed parrotbills rely on reedbeds because it is their natural environment that is home to both their water and food. Recently, the population of this species has been declining due to degradation of reedbeds in their environment. This habitat loss has detrimentally affected the population of reed parrotbills.

== Diet ==
Reed parrotbills feed on insects, including pancake-shaped insects known as Alceridae. Reed parrotbills cut through reed stems with their bills to obtain food inside, and make very loud noises while doing so. They lack the hind part of the stomach that is responsible for grinding food. Reed parrotbills have a difficult time digesting hard food items because they lack the gizzard muscle.

== Breeding ==
Reed parrotbill are occasionally multi-brooded meaning they raise multiple broods a season. Their first laying season occurs from the middle of May to the middle of July. The second occurs from the middle of July to the middle of August. The third season is from the middle of August to the middle of September. They are typically found in pairs during breeding season. They breed mainly in the summer and in their thick nests located in China. However, their habitats are being taken away because of the re-development in China which causes them to have a loss of ecosystem. This directly connects to their breeding, and has caused it to decline.

== Conservation status ==
The reed parrotbill species is predicted to decline rapidly as a result of degradation of their habitat. They are not threatened globally, it's considered "near threatened". The main threats to their species are associated with clearance of reedbeds and over-harvesting reeds. The population trend is decreasing fast, and there is a continuing decline of mature individuals.
