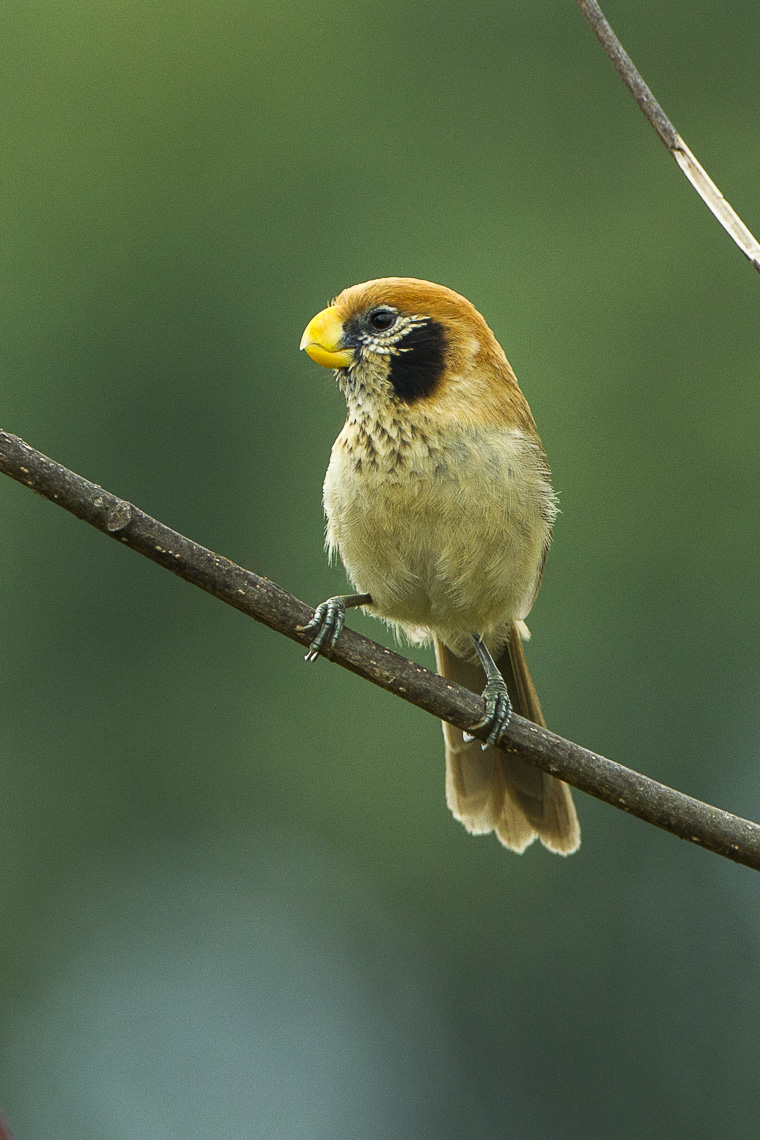
- Spot-breasted parrotbill (Paradoxornis guttaticollis)

Scientific classification
- Kingdom: Animalia
- Phylum: Chordata
- Class: Aves
- Order: Passeriformes
- Superfamily: Sylvioidea
- Family: Paradoxornithidae; Horsfield & Moore, 1854

Genera
- Myzornis; Moupinia; Lioparus; Chrysomma; Rhopophilus; Fulvetta; Chamaea; Paradoxornis; Suthora

= Paradoxornithidae =

Group of birds

The Paradoxornithidae are a family of passerine birds that are primarily native to East, Southeast and South Asia, with a single species in western North America, though feral populations exist elsewhere. They are generally small birds that inhabit reedbeds, forests and similar habitats. The traditional parrotbills feed mainly on seeds, e.g. of grasses, to which their robust bill, as the name implies, is well-adapted. Members of the family are usually non-migratory.

The bearded reedling or "bearded tit", a Eurasian species formerly placed here, is more insectivorous by comparison, especially in summer. It also strikingly differs in morphology, such as its finer bill, and has again been moved to the monotypic family Panuridae. Conversely, a number of other mostly insectivorous species that traditionally were placed in Timaliidae (Old World babblers), for example the fulvettas and fire-tailed myzornis, along with the wrentit (a species with a conflicting taxonomic history), have been moved into Paradoxornithidae. DNA sequence data supports this.

Their general habitus and acrobatic habits resemble birds like the long-tailed tits. Together with these and others they were at some time placed in the titmouse family Paridae. Later studies found no justification to presume a close relationship between all these birds, and consequently the parrotbills and bearded reedling were removed from the tits and chickadees and placed into a distinct family. As names like Paradoxornis paradoxus – "puzzling, paradox bird" – suggest, their true relationships were very unclear, although by the latter 20th century they were generally seen as close to Timaliidae (Old World babblers) and Sylviidae (Old World warblers).

== Taxonomy ==
Since 1990 (Sibley & Ahlquist 1990), molecular data has been added to aid the efforts of discovering the parrotbills' true relationships. As Paradoxornis species are generally elusive and in many cases little-known birds, usually specimens of the bearded reedling which are far more easy to procure were used for the analyses. Often, the entire group was entirely left out of analyses, being small and seemingly insignificant in the large pattern of bird evolution (e.g. Barker et al. 2002, 2004). The bearded reedling tended to appear close to larks in phylogenies based on e.g. DNA-DNA hybridization (Sibley & Ahlquist 1990), or on mtDNA cytochrome b and nDNA c-myc exon 3, RAG-1 and myoglobin intron 2 sequence data (Ericson & Johansson 2003). Placement in a superfamily Sylvioidea which contained birds such as Sylviidae, Timaliidae and long-tailed tits – but not Paridae – was confirmed.

Cibois (2003a) analyzed mtDNA cytochrome b and 12S/16S rRNA sequences of some Sylvioidea, among them several species of Paradoxornis but not the bearded reedling. These formed a robust clade closer to the Sylvia typical warblers and some presumed "Old World babblers" such as Chrysomma sinense than to other birds. The puzzle was finally resolved by Alström et al. (2006), who studied mtDNA cytochrome b and nDNA myoglobin intron 2 sequences of a wider range of Sylvioidea: The bearded reedling was not a parrotbill at all, but forms a distinct lineage on its own, the relationships of which are not entirely resolved at present. The parrotbills' presence in the clade containing Sylvia, on the other hand, necessitates that the Paradoxornithidae are placed in synonymy of the Sylviidae. Cibois (2003b) even suggested that these themselves were to be merged with the remaining Timaliidae and the latter name to be adopted. This has hitherto not been followed and researchers remain equivocal as many taxa in Sylviidae and Timaliidae remain to be tested for their relationships. In any case, it is most likely that the typical warbler-parrotbill group is monophyletic and therefore agrees with the modern requirements for a taxon. Hence, whether to keep or to synonymize it is entirely a matter of philosophy, as the scientific facts would agree with either approach.

The interesting conclusion from an evolutionary point of view is that the morphologically both internally homogenous and compared to each other highly dissimilar typical warblers and parrotbills form the two extremes in the divergent evolution of the Sylviidae. This is underscored by looking at the closest living relatives of the parrotbills in the rearranged Sylviidae: The genus Chrysomma are non-specialized species altogether intermediate in habitus, habitat and habits between the typical warblers and the parrotbills. Presumably, the ancestral sylviids looked much like these birds. How dramatic the evolutionary changes wrought upon the parrotbills in their adaptation to feeding on grass caryopses and similar seeds were can be seen by comparing them with the typical fulvettas, which were formerly considered Timaliidae and united with the alcippes (Pasquet 2006). These look somewhat like drab fairy-wrens and have none of the parrotbills' adaptations to food and habitat. Yet it appears that the typical fulvettas' and parrotbills' common ancestor evolved into at least two parrotbill lineages independently (Cibois 2003a) & (Yeung et al. 2006). Only the wrentit, the only American sylviid, resembles the parrotbills much in habitus, though not in color pattern, and of course, as an insectivore, neither in bill shape.

The phylogenetic relationships between the Paradoxornithidae and other families was determined in a molecular phylogenetic study by Tianlong Cai and collaborators that was published in 2019. It is shown in the cladogram below:.

- - Pycnonotidae – bulbuls (161 species)
  - - - Sylviidae – sylviid warblers (32 species)
      - Paradoxornithidae – parrotbills and myzornis (38 species)
    - - Zosteropidae – white-eyes (147 species)
      - - Timaliidae – tree babblers (58 species)
        - - Pellorneidae – ground babblers (65 species)
          - Leiothrichidae – laughingthrushes and allies (143 species)

The cladogram below shows the relationships between the genera in the family Paradoxornithidae. It is based on the results of the molecular phylogenetic study by Tianlong Cai and collaborators and the generic divisions adopted by Frank Gill, Pamela Rasmussen and David Donsker in the list of birds maintained on behalf of the International Ornithological Committee.

- Paradoxornithidae
  - Myzornis – fire-tailed myzornis
  - - Moupinia – rufous-tailed babbler
    - - Lioparus – golden-breasted fulvetta
      - - - Chrysomma – babblers (2 species)
          - - Rhopophilus – babblers (2 species)
            - Fulvetta – fulvettas (8 species)
        - - - Chamaea – wrentit
            - Paradoxornis – parrotbills (10 species)
          - Suthora – parrotbills (12 species)

== Species ==
There are 38 species of parrotbills and allies distributed among 9 genera. This list is presented according to the IOC taxonomic sequence and can also be sorted alphabetically by common name and binomial.

Genus	Image	Common name	Binomial name	IOC sequence
Myzornis Blyth, 1843		Fire-tailed myzornis	Myzornis pyrrhoura	1
Moupinia David & Oustalet, 1877		Rufous-tailed babbler	Moupinia poecilotis	2
Lioparus Oates, 1889		Golden-breasted fulvetta	Lioparus chrysotis	3
Chrysomma Blyth, 1843		Yellow-eyed babbler	Chrysomma sinense	4
Chrysomma Blyth, 1843		Jerdon's babbler	Chrysomma altirostre	5
Rhopophilus Giglioli & Salvadori, 1870		Tarim babbler	Rhopophilus albosuperciliaris	6
Rhopophilus Giglioli & Salvadori, 1870		Beijing babbler	Rhopophilus pekinensis	7
Fulvetta David & Oustalet, 1877		Spectacled fulvetta	Fulvetta ruficapilla	8
Fulvetta David & Oustalet, 1877		Indochinese fulvetta	Fulvetta danisi	9
Fulvetta David & Oustalet, 1877		Chinese fulvetta	Fulvetta striaticollis	10
Fulvetta David & Oustalet, 1877		White-browed fulvetta	Fulvetta vinipectus	11
Fulvetta David & Oustalet, 1877		Brown-throated fulvetta	Fulvetta ludlowi	12
Fulvetta David & Oustalet, 1877		Manipur fulvetta	Fulvetta manipurensis	13
Fulvetta David & Oustalet, 1877		Grey-hooded fulvetta	Fulvetta cinereiceps	14
Fulvetta David & Oustalet, 1877		Taiwan fulvetta	Fulvetta formosana	15
Chamaea Gambel, 1847		Wrentit	Chamaea fasciata	16
Paradoxornis Gould, 1836		Reed parrotbill	Paradoxornis heudei	17
Paradoxornis Gould, 1836		Black-breasted parrotbill	Paradoxornis flavirostris	18
Paradoxornis Gould, 1836		Spot-breasted parrotbill	Paradoxornis guttaticollis	19
Paradoxornis Gould, 1836		Great parrotbill	Paradoxornis aemodium	20
Paradoxornis Gould, 1836		Brown parrotbill	Paradoxornis unicolor	21
Paradoxornis Gould, 1836		Three-toed parrotbill	Paradoxornis paradoxus	22
Paradoxornis Gould, 1836		Grey-headed parrotbill	Paradoxornis gularis	23
Paradoxornis Gould, 1836		Black-headed parrotbill	Paradoxornis margaritae	24
Paradoxornis Gould, 1836		White-breasted parrotbill	Paradoxornis ruficeps	25
Paradoxornis Gould, 1836		Rufous-headed parrotbill	Paradoxornis bakeri	26
Suthora Hodgson, 1837		Short-tailed parrotbill	Suthora davidiana	27
Suthora Hodgson, 1837		Fulvous parrotbill	Suthora fulvifrons	28
Suthora Hodgson, 1837		Black-throated parrotbill	Suthora nipalensis	29
Suthora Hodgson, 1837		Golden parrotbill	Suthora verreauxi	30
Suthora Hodgson, 1837		Pale-billed parrotbill	Suthora atrosuperciliaris	31
Suthora Hodgson, 1837		Spectacled parrotbill	Suthora conspicillata	32
Suthora Hodgson, 1837		Grey-hooded parrotbill	Suthora zappeyi	33
Suthora Hodgson, 1837		Brown-winged parrotbill	Suthora brunnea	34
Suthora Hodgson, 1837		Eye-ringed parrotbill	Suthora ricketti	35
Suthora Hodgson, 1837		Vinous-throated parrotbill	Suthora webbiana	36
Suthora Hodgson, 1837		Ashy-throated parrotbill	Suthora alphonsiana	37
Suthora Hodgson, 1837		Przevalski's parrotbill	Suthora przewalskii	38

== Egg recognition ==
Parrotbill egg recognition is the ability of the parrotbill to distinguish its own eggs against the eggs of a brood parasite. Without their own eggs in the nest, parrotbills are not able to identify whether their nest has been intruded by the eggs of a brood parasite. Because the colour and number of eggs may vary, there are varying outcomes to whether parrotbills will reject or accept the eggs whether it be their own or if they are acting host for another species. Cognitive mechanisms including recognition by discordance and template-based recognition are hypothesized to be the manner in which a host's eggs are identified. The common cuckoo lays its eggs in the nests of parrotbills and the two have co-evolved together over time to promote the reproductive success of both species. The common cuckoo is an example of an avian brood parasite that reduces the energy cost of caring for its eggs by placing them in the parrotbill's nest.

Depending on the parrotbill species, the eggs will either be maculate with spots or marks or immaculate, meaning without spots or marks. The cuckoo is also able to lay eggs that replicate the ones of its hosts in a means to have its eggs accepted by the host. Whether the parasitic eggs are accepted by the host is based on two hypothetical cognitive mechanisms. True or template-based recognition predicts that by learning or by instinct, the parrotbill would be able to reject the brood parasite eggs. If learned, the parrotbill would imprint on its own eggs and would be able to use it as a template to compare to foreign eggs. Recognition by discordancy is the least favoured hypothesis among scientists of the two mechanisms, but describes the action of rejecting the eggs which appear to be the minority whether it is their own eggs or the parasite's eggs; it does not require learning or instinctive behaviour. Some studies have predicted discordancy is favoured as certain species demonstrate the behaviour at all life stages; if the behaviour is demonstrated at a young age, it may not be an example of learning as the time for learning could be too short.

One parrotbill species that has been studied is the ashy-throated parrotbill (Paradoxornis alphonsianus) and demonstrated the use of both mechanisms relaying there may not be one "universal method". The eggs of the ashy-throated parrotbill are immaculate and polymorphic in which multiple phenotypic colours in that species is produced; its eggs are placed in competition with the eggs of the common cuckoo (Cuculus canorus). Typically, the female cuckoo lays its eggs in the nest of the parrotbill after taking out one of the host's eggs. The immaculate colours in this species are blue, pale blue and white, but only one colour is present at a time and the female produces only one colour over its lifetime.

If parrotbills do not have their own eggs within the nest, it has been observed they accept the eggs of the avian brood parasite, as the "cue" of the presence of their own eggs has not been established. Time is also important for both male and female parrotbills as it can be the factor in whether the parrotbill will recognize parasitic eggs. For females, it is crucial they learn the egg phenotype as the eggs are being laid, but if this learning is not immediate, parasitic eggs can be accepted and imprinted. Males learn their respective egg phenotype once the clutch has reached completion.

In some species, male parrotbills also incubate eggs, and they are predicted to follow discordancy recognition for this behaviour as the males may encounter multiple egg types with different mates over time. This could lead to rejection of their own eggs based on previous knowledge of egg colour. A possible exception to this idea is if the host parrotbill produces eggs that are monomorphic. If male parrotbills do not imprint on their own eggs, they increase the probability of production of varied phenotypes of egg colour and patterns within the population.

If a host species is new to an area, it is suspected cuckoo parasitism will be favoured as recognition of parasitic eggs has not yet occurred. Over time, the two species co-evolve with the parrotbill first utilizing one of the hypothesized cognitive mechanisms in order to recognize parasitic eggs. In order to compensate for this new behaviour in parrotbills, the parasite produces eggs that are similar to those of the host and leads to the evolution of polymorphisms over time for both species.
