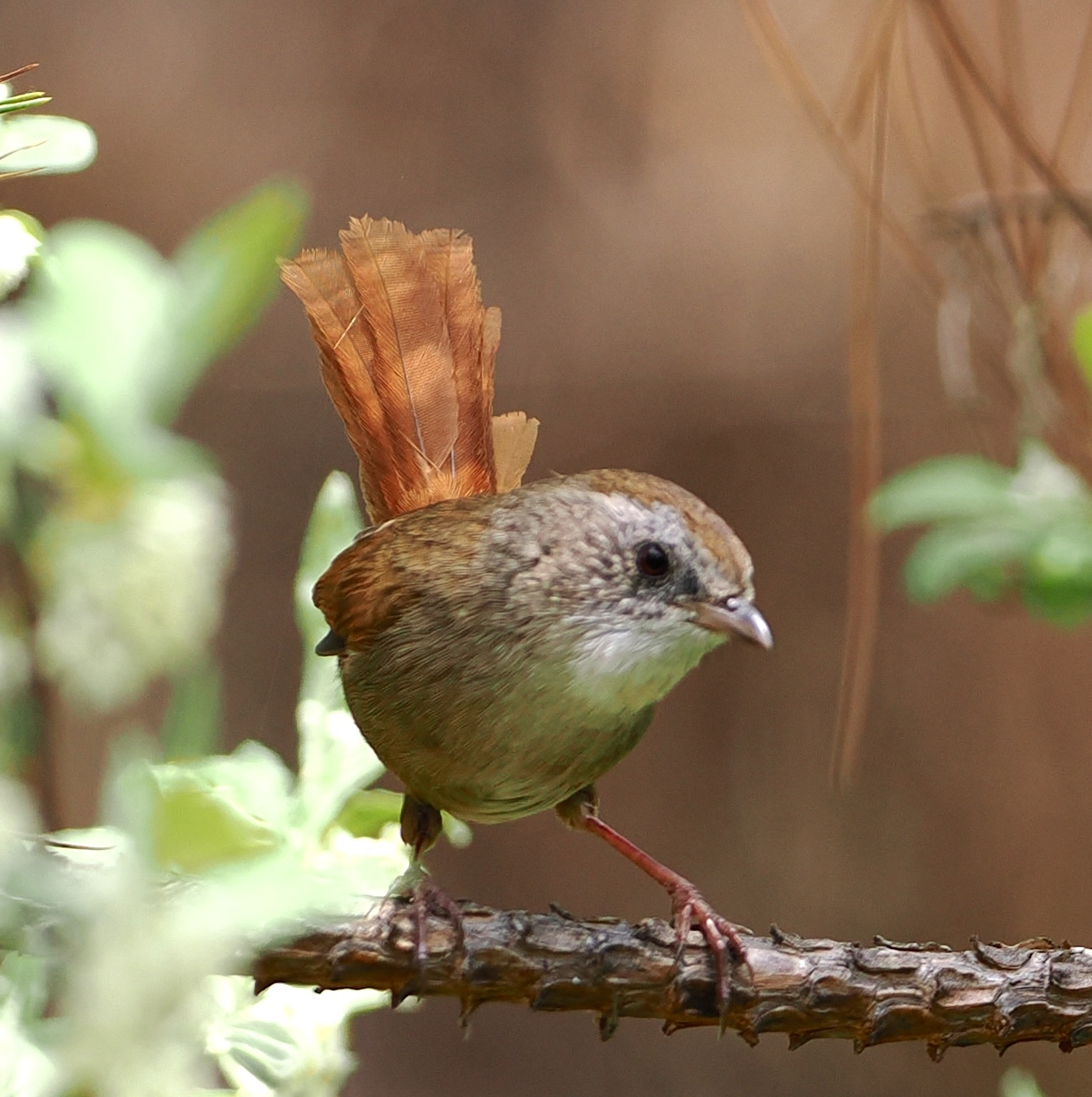

Conservation status
- Least Concern (IUCN 3.1)

Scientific classification
- Kingdom: Animalia
- Phylum: Chordata
- Class: Aves
- Order: Passeriformes
- Family: Paradoxornithidae
- Genus: Moupinia; David & Oustalet, 1877
- Species: M. poecilotis

Binomial name
- Moupinia poecilotis (Verreaux, 1871)

Synonyms
- Chrysomma poecilotis

= Rufous-tailed babbler =

Species of bird

The rufous-tailed babbler (Moupinia poecilotis) is a bird species in the family Paradoxornithidae. As with many other species known as "babblers", it was formerly placed in the family Sylviidae. It is endemic to central China.

The genus Moupinia was introduced by the French ornithologists Armand David and Émile Oustalet in 1877.
