= D'Ering Memorial Wildlife Sanctuary =

Protected area in Arunachal Pradesh, India

- IUCN category IV (habitat/species management area)
- Location within Arunachal Pradesh Location within India
- Interactive map of D'Ering Memorial Wildlife Sanctuary
- Location: Arunachal Pradesh, India
- Coordinates: 27°56′16″N 95°26′45″E
- Area: 190 km^{2} (73 sq mi)
- Established: 1978

D'Ering Memorial Wildlife Sanctuary is a protected area in Arunachal Pradesh, India, with an area of 190 km^{2} (73 sq mi). It was established in 1978. About 80% of the area is grassland, and the remaining is riverine forest mixed with bamboo and secondary forests. The fauna in the sanctuary includes tiger and leopard. The Indian hare is particularly common.
