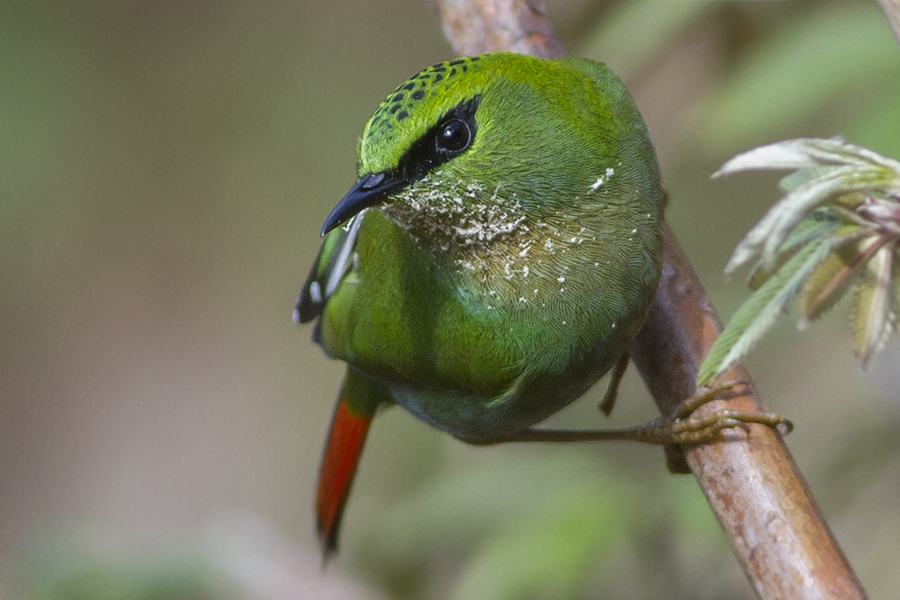
- Male from Pangolakha Wildlife Sanctuary, Sikkim, India

Conservation status
- Least Concern (IUCN 3.1)

Scientific classification
- Kingdom: Animalia
- Phylum: Chordata
- Class: Aves
- Order: Passeriformes
- Family: Paradoxornithidae
- Genus: Myzornis; Blyth, 1843
- Species: M. pyrrhoura

Binomial name
- Myzornis pyrrhoura Blyth, 1843

= Fire-tailed myzornis =

Species of bird

The fire-tailed myzornis (Myzornis pyrrhoura) is a species of bird. Its genus Myzornis is monotypic, and has recently been transferred to the family Paradoxornithidae, having formerly been treated in the family Timaliidae.

== Name ==
The monotypic genus name, Myzornis, which is also the bird's common name, is derived from the Greek μῠζᾰ́ω (mŭzắō), meaning "to suck", and ὄρνῑς (órnīs), meaning "bird", in reference to its nectar-eating habits; the species epithet is derived from the Greek πῠρρός (pŭrrhós), meaning "flame-coloured", and -οὐρά (-ourá), meaning "tail".

== Description ==
The fire-tailed myzornis is a small species of warbler-like bird, 11–13 cm (4.3–5.1 in) long and weighing 10–13 g (0.35–0.46 oz). It has bright green plumage with a black mask around the eyes and black scalloping on the crown. The wing is black and white with a streak of bright red and the sides of the tail are bright red. The bill is long, slightly curved, and black. It is usually silent, but has a high-pitched tsi-tsit call.

== Distribution and habitat ==
The species is found in the Himalaya in Bhutan, southwestern China (southeast Xizang, western Yunnan), northeastern India (Arunachal Pradesh, Sikkim, northernmost West Bengal), northern Myanmar, and Nepal. Its natural habitat is temperate to alpine moist montane forests. It is a common species in the upper ridges of the Sikkim and Arunachal Himalayas, between 1,600–4,300 metres according to climatic conditions and seasonal variation. It prefers bamboo thickets, rhododendrons, birches, and junipers. There is some seasonal movement, occurring at (2,000–) 2,700–3,950 m or higher in summer, and descending to lower altitudes of 1,600–2,750 m in autumn and winter.

== Ecology ==
The fire-tailed myzornis feeds on insects, spiders and small arthropods, as well as consuming fruit, nectar (particularly from rhododendron flowers) and sap from trees. The breeding season is mainly in April to June, but may be longer, as juveniles have been observed in mid-September in Bhutan.

== Gallery ==
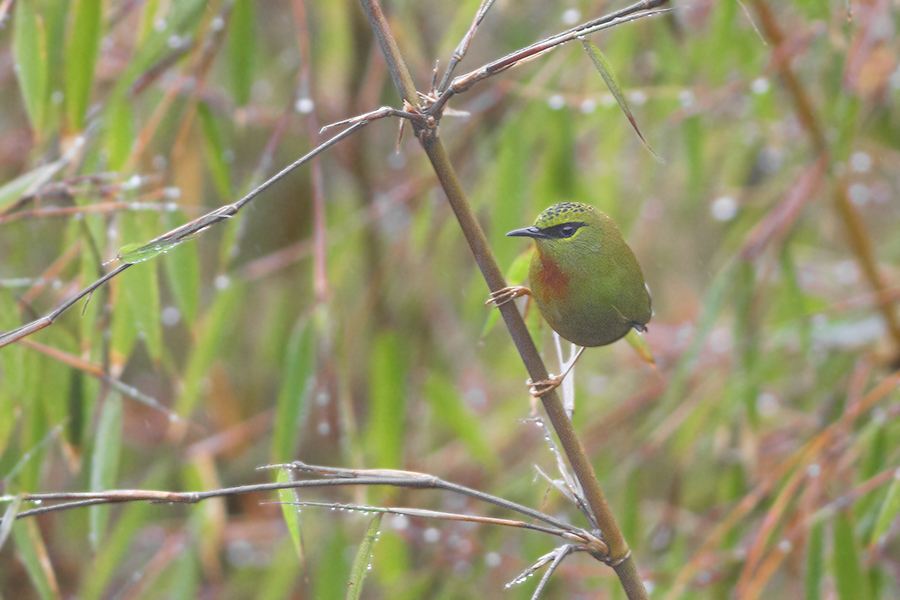
Bamboo stalks

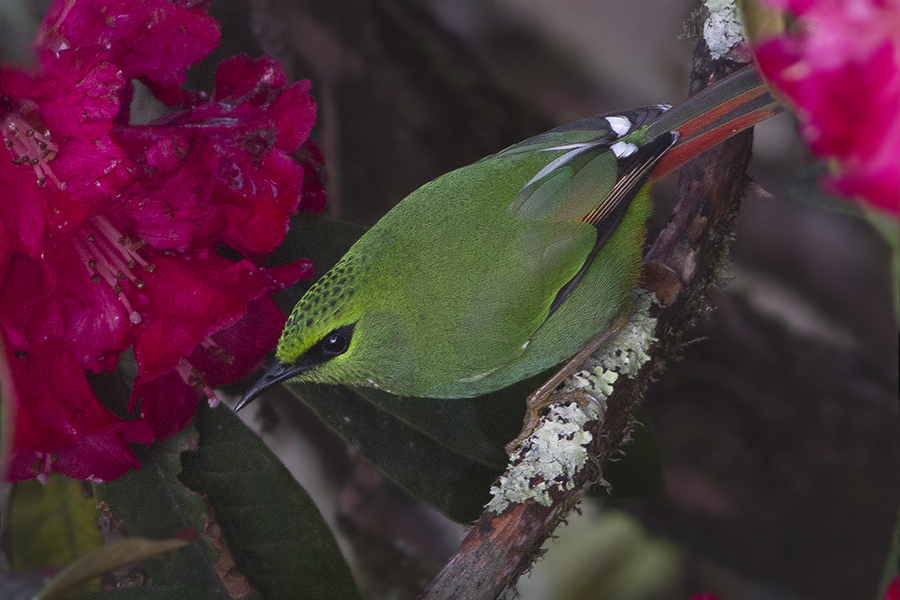
Rhododendron

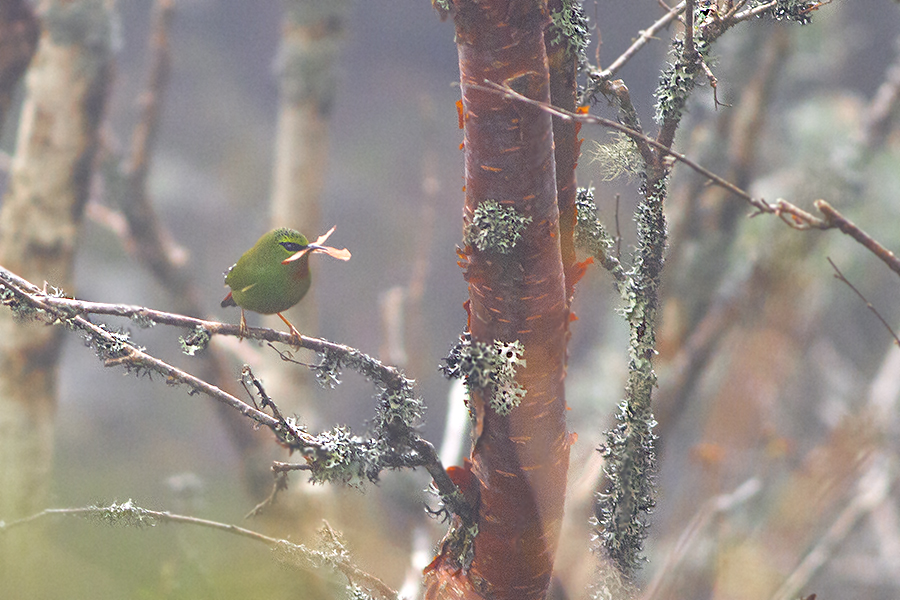
Birch

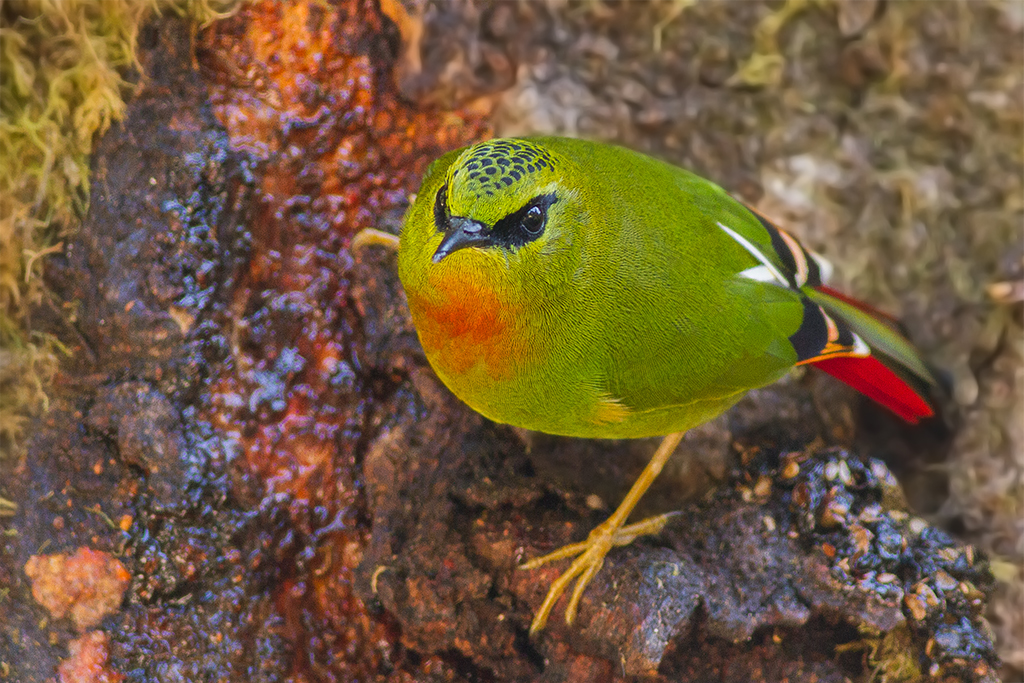
Oak

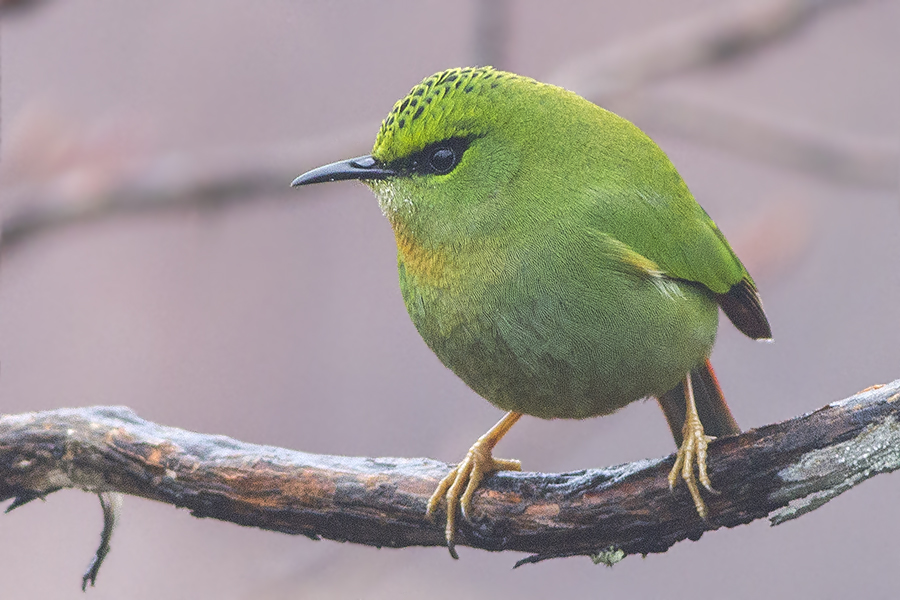
Rhododendron

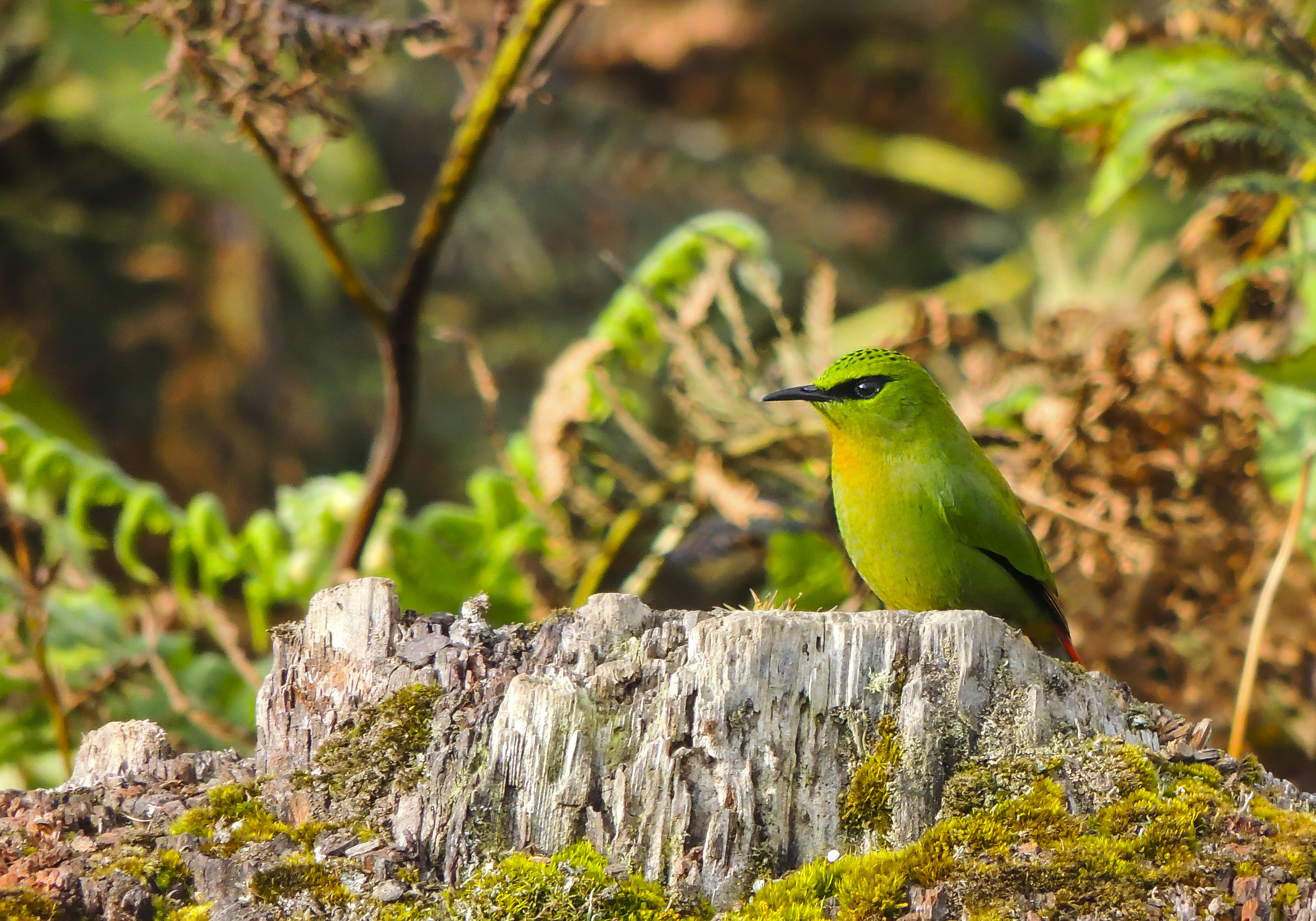
Fire-tailed myzornis sunbathing beside Dirang Mandala Road at Eaglenest Wildlife Sanctuary
