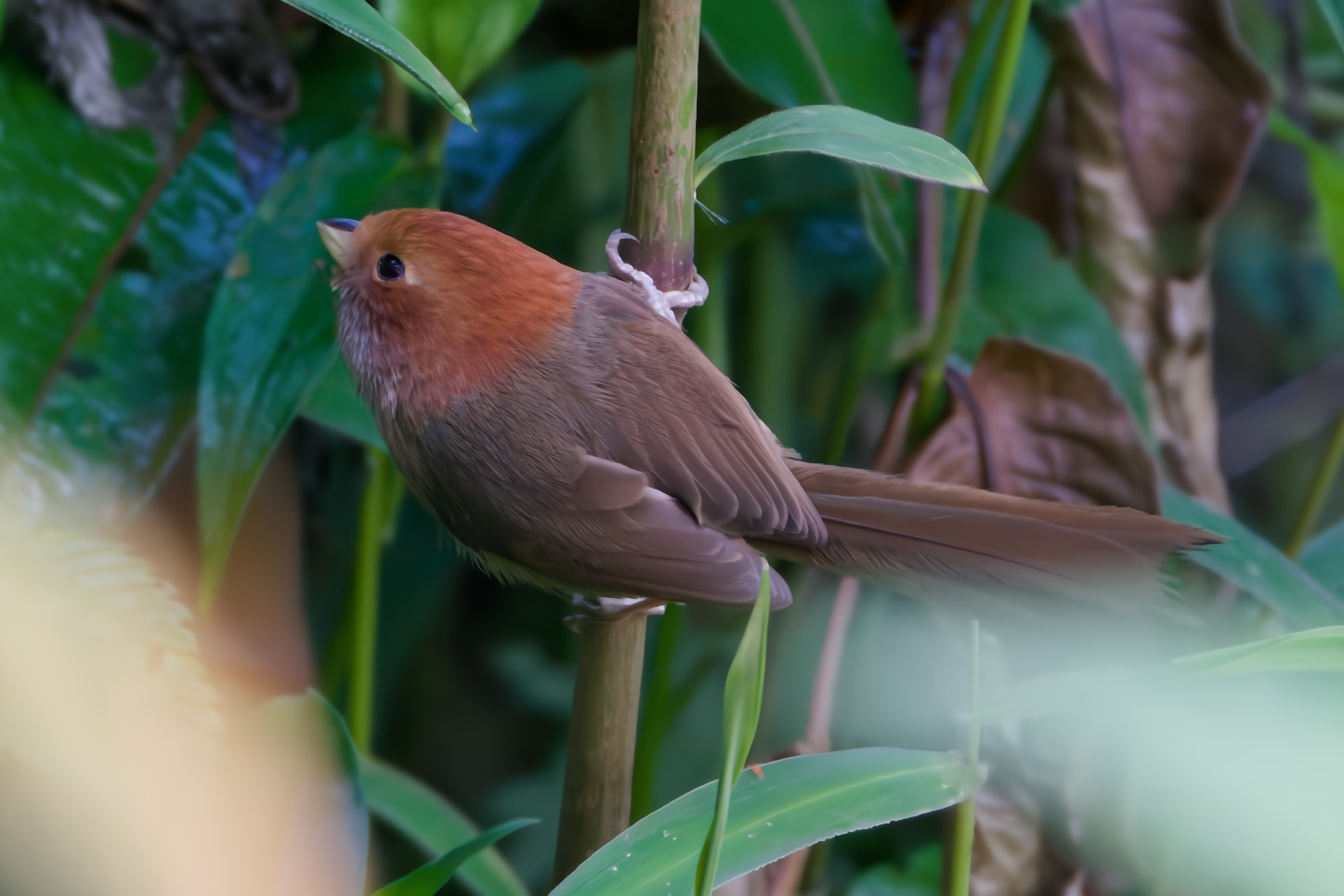

Conservation status
- Least Concern (IUCN 3.1)

Scientific classification
- Kingdom: Animalia
- Phylum: Chordata
- Class: Aves
- Order: Passeriformes
- Family: Paradoxornithidae
- Genus: Suthora
- Species: S. brunnea

Binomial name
- Suthora brunnea Anderson, 1871

Synonyms
- Paradoxornis brunneus Sinosuthora brunnea

= Brown-winged parrotbill =

Species of bird

The brown-winged parrotbill (Suthora brunnea) is a parrotbill that was formerly placed in the Old World babblers (family Timaliidae) or in the Sylviidae, but has been shown by molecular genetic studies to belong to the distinct family Paradoxornithidae. The eye-ringed parrotbill (Suthora ricketti) was formerly considered to be a subspecies.

It is found in China and Myanmar.

== Subspecies ==
Two subspecies are recognised:

- Suthora brunnea brunnea Anderson, 1871 – central, east Myanmar to north, northwest Yunnan (southwest China)
- Suthora brunnea styani Rippon, G, 1903 – Dali area (central west Yunnan in southwest China)
