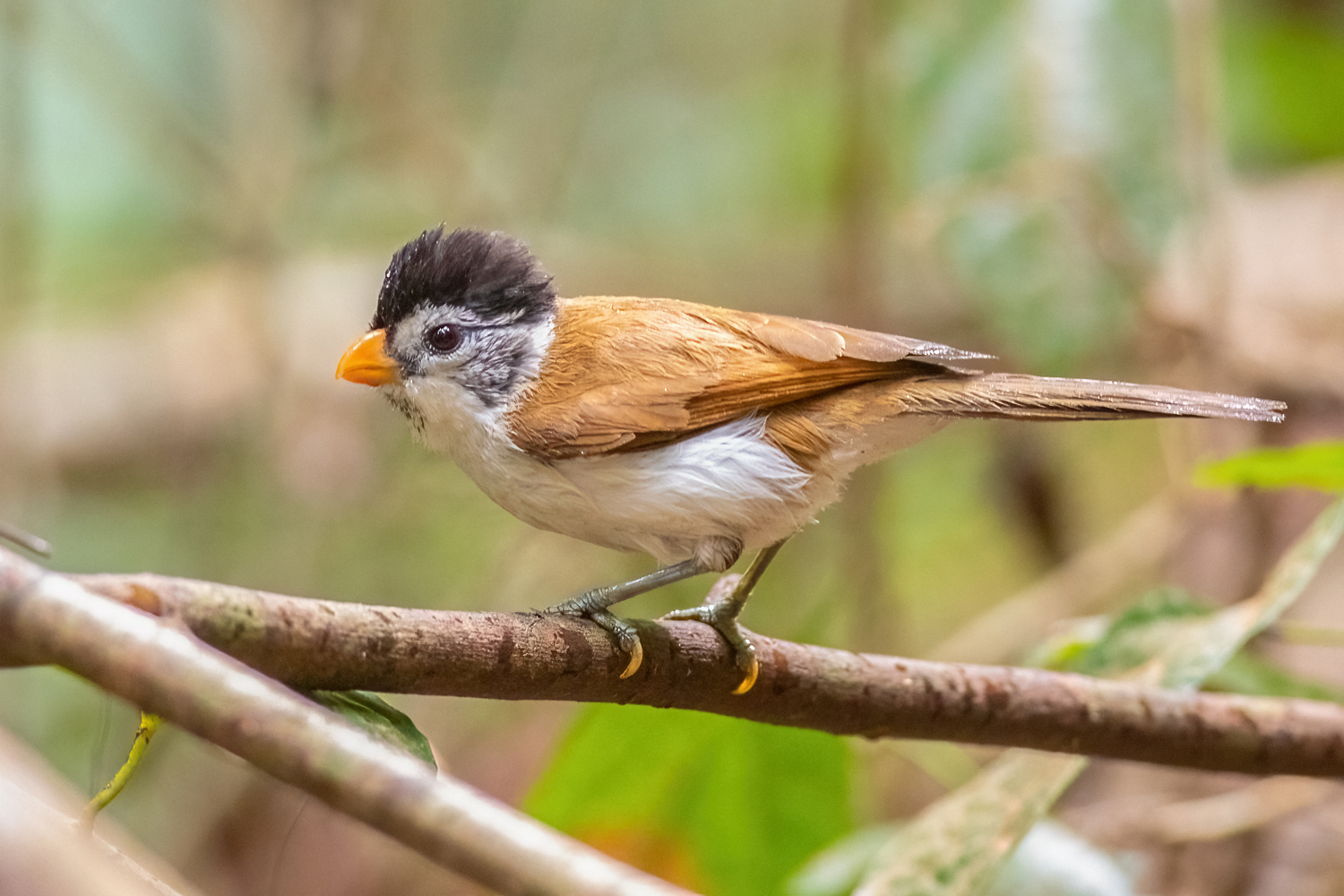

Conservation status
- Vulnerable (IUCN 3.1)

Scientific classification
- Kingdom: Animalia
- Phylum: Chordata
- Class: Aves
- Order: Passeriformes
- Family: Paradoxornithidae
- Genus: Paradoxornis
- Species: P. margaritae

Binomial name
- Paradoxornis margaritae (Delacour, 1927)

Synonyms
- Psittiparus margaritae Delacour, 1927

= Black-headed parrotbill =

Species of bird

The black-headed parrotbill (Paradoxornis margaritae) is a bird species often placed with the Old World babblers (family Timaliidae) or in the Sylviidae, but it actually seems to belong to the distinct family Paradoxornithidae.

It is found in eastern Cambodia and southern Vietnam. Its natural habitat is subtropical or tropical moist montane forests.
