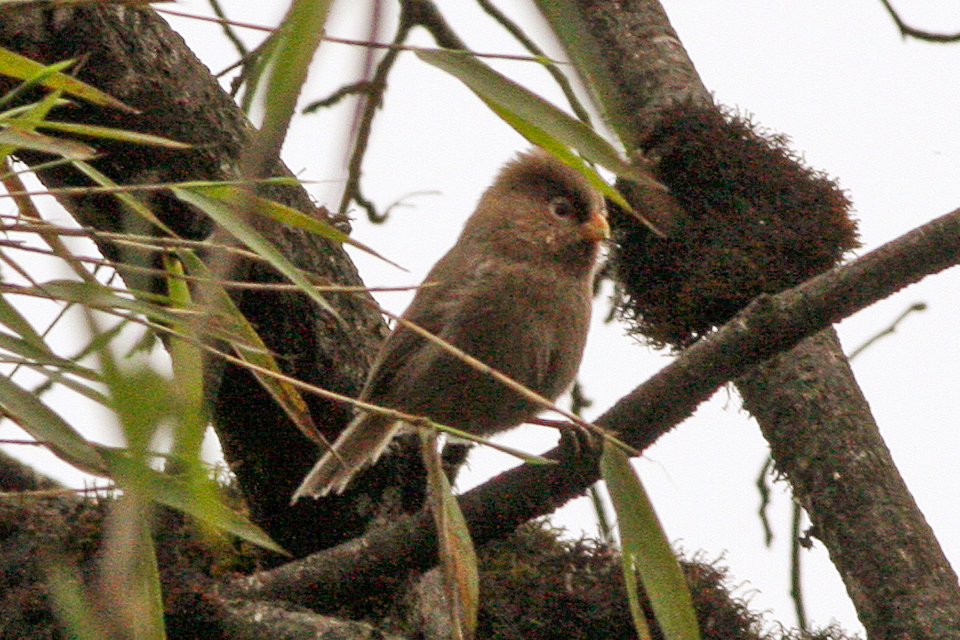

Conservation status
- Least Concern (IUCN 3.1)

Scientific classification
- Kingdom: Animalia
- Phylum: Chordata
- Class: Aves
- Order: Passeriformes
- Family: Paradoxornithidae
- Genus: Paradoxornis
- Species: P. paradoxus

Binomial name
- Paradoxornis paradoxus (Verreaux, J, 1871)

Synonyms
- Cholornis paradoxus

= Three-toed parrotbill =

Species of bird

The three-toed parrotbill (Paradoxornis paradoxus) is a species of bird in the family Paradoxornithidae. It is endemic to central China. Its natural habitat is temperate forests.

== Sources ==
- Robson, C. (2007). Family Paradoxornithidae (Parrotbills) pp. 292–321 in; del Hoyo, J., Elliott, A. & Christie, D.A. eds. Handbook of the Birds of the World, Vol. 12. Picathartes to Tits and Chickadees. Lynx Edicions, Barcelona.
