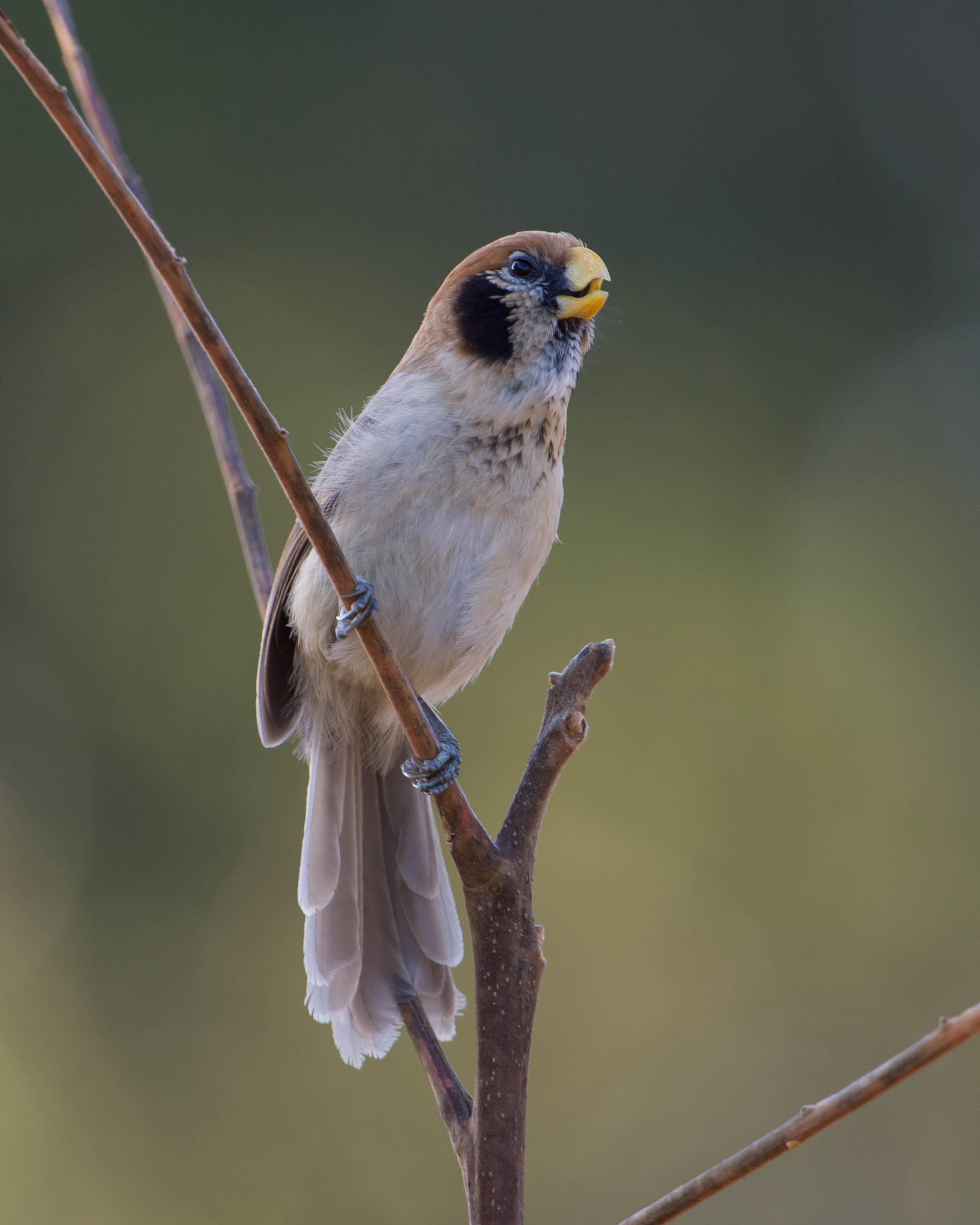
- Chiang Mai, Thailand

Conservation status
- Least Concern (IUCN 3.1)

Scientific classification
- Kingdom: Animalia
- Phylum: Chordata
- Class: Aves
- Order: Passeriformes
- Family: Paradoxornithidae
- Genus: Paradoxornis
- Species: P. guttaticollis

Binomial name
- Paradoxornis guttaticollis David, A, 1871

Synonyms
- Paradaoxornis austeni Gould, 1874

= Spot-breasted parrotbill =

Species of bird

The spot-breasted parrotbill (Paradoxornis guttaticollis) is a species of bird in the family Paradoxornithidae. It is found in Bangladesh, China, India, Laos, Myanmar, Thailand, and Vietnam.
