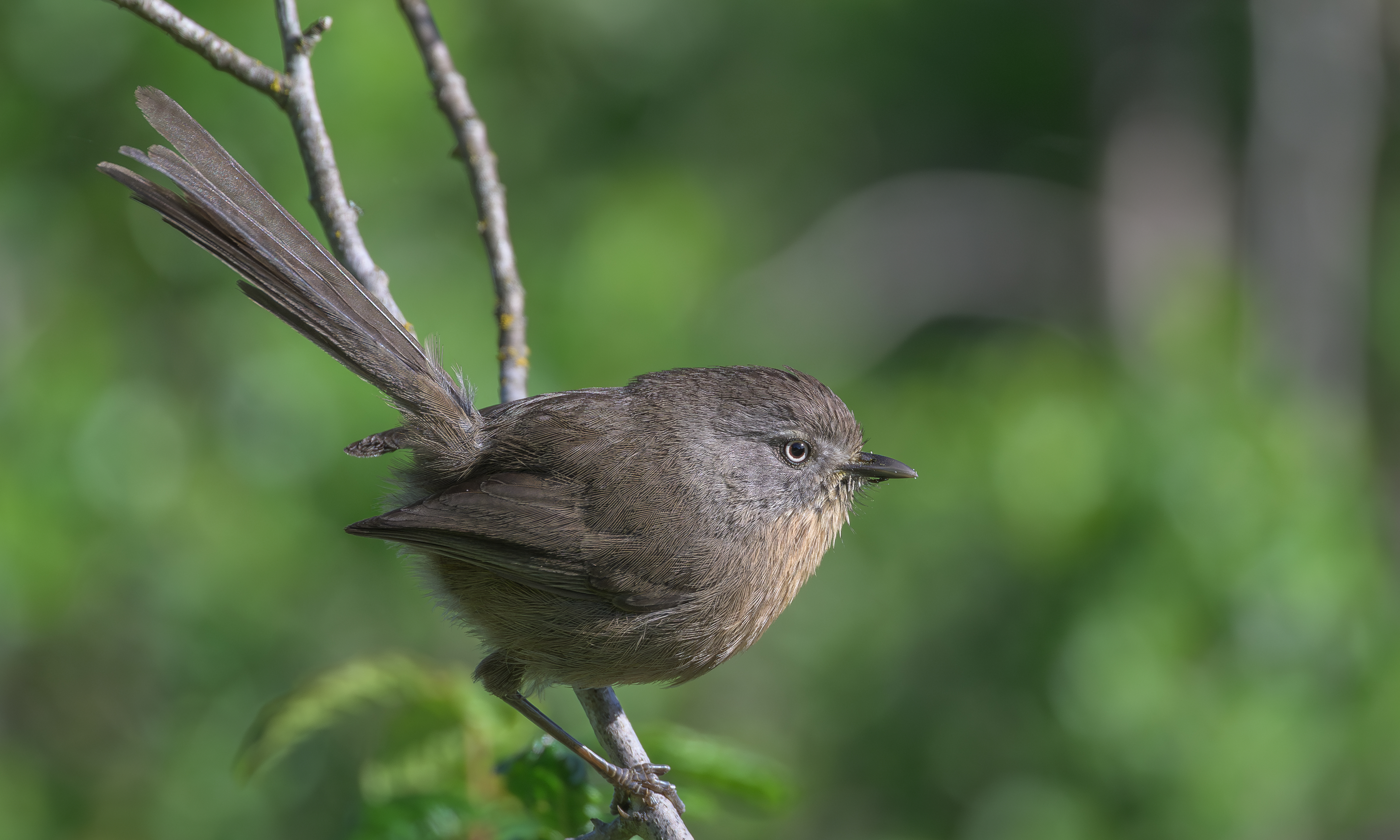

Conservation status
- Least Concern (IUCN 3.1)

Scientific classification
- Kingdom: Animalia
- Phylum: Chordata
- Class: Aves
- Order: Passeriformes
- Family: Paradoxornithidae
- Genus: Chamaea; Gambel, 1847
- Species: C. fasciata

Binomial name
- Chamaea fasciata (Gambel, 1845)

= Wrentit =

Species of bird

The wrentit (Chamaea fasciata) is a small bird that lives in chaparral, oak woodlands, and bushland on the western coast of North America, from Oregon south through California to northern Baja California. It is the only species in the genus Chamaea.

Its systematics have been the subject of much debate, the wrentit having been placed in many different families by different authors for as long as it has been known to science. Its common name reflects the uncertainty, and its external resemblance to both tits and wrens. It is not related to either, however. More recent and comprehensive phylogenetic studies support it belonging to the parrotbill family Paradoxornithidae.

== Description ==
Wrentit song

The wrentit is a small, 14–16 cm (5.5–6.3 in) bird with uniform dull olive, brown, or grayish plumage. It has short wings and a long tail often held high (hence the comparison to wrens). It has a short bill and a pale iris. Given its retiring nature and loud voice, the wrentit is more likely to be detected by its call than by sight. The distinct sound that it makes is similar to the sound of a ping-pong ball falling on the table.

== Systematics ==
The wrentit when first described by William Gambel in 1845 was included in the genus Parus in the tit and chickadee family (Paridae), but even then he had doubts as to that placement, and just two years later, he described a new genus Chamaea for it, in which it has remained subsequently. Until the advent of modern genetic studies, it had been variously placed in its own family, the Chamaeidae, or with the "Old World warblers" (Sylviidae), or (by Ernst Mayr in 1946) in the parrotbill family (Paradoxornithidae), or most frequently, with the "Old World babblers" (Timaliidae). The American Ornithologists' Union concurred with the latter family, giving it the distinction of being the only babbler known from the New World.

Through DNA sequence genetic analysis, it was first suggested that the wrentit was more closely allied to Sylvia warblers and some aberrant "babblers". These consequently must be placed in the family Sylviidae together with the wrentit and the parrotbills which also turned out to be close relatives. This placed the wrentit as the only American species of the "true" or sylviid warblers. Notably, the Dartford warbler and close relatives like Marmora's warbler bear an uncanny resemblance to the wrentit; their ecology is quite similar indeed, as all are birds of Mediterranean scrub. However, biogeography and the molecular data build a strong case for this similarity being a case of convergent evolution between birds that are close relatives but by far not as close as their appearance would suggest.

Then in 2019, a major taxonomic revision of species formerly classified as "babblers" recovered Chamaea as being most closely allied with the parrotbills and fulvettas, which are also an otherwise exclusively Asian group. Due to their phylogenetic and morphological distinctiveness, the family Paradoxornithidae was revived for this group, including the wrentit, as noted presciently in Ernst Mayr's suggestion from 1946.

== Distribution ==
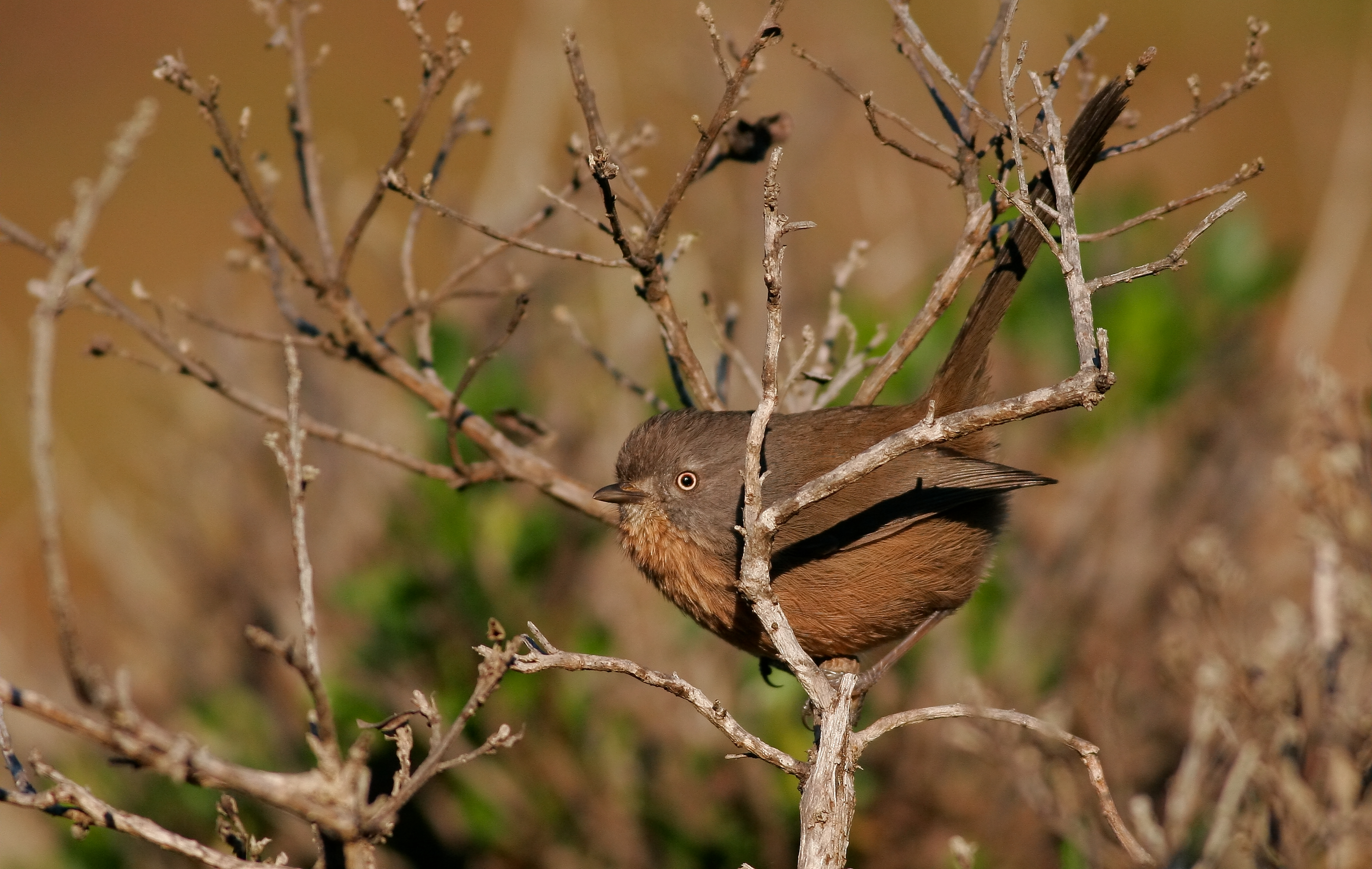
Wrentit in the Marin Headlands on the California coast.

The wrentit is a sedentary (non-migratory) resident of a narrow strip of coastal habitat along the western coast of North America, being found from Oregon south through California, to Baja California, the northern state of the Baja California peninsula.

It is usually restricted to certain chaparral and woodland habitats. It nests in 1 meter (3 ft) high shrubs such as poison oak (Toxicodendron diversilobum), coyote bush (Baccharis pilularis) and California blackberry (Rubus ursinus). Logging and other changes in habitat have led to this species expanding its range recently, particularly northwards. Although present along the entire Oregon coast right up to the north end of Clatsop Spit, its poor dispersive ability has resulted in it never crossing the Columbia River into Washington.

=== Subspecies ===
Five subspecies are accepted:

- Chamaea fasciata phaea Osgood, WH, 1899 — coastal western Oregon (Columbia River to California border)
- Chamaea fasciata margra Browning, MR, 1992 — interior western Oregon (Willamette Valley)
- Chamaea fasciata rufula Ridgway, R, 1903 — coastal northern California (Del Norte to Marin counties)
- Chamaea fasciata fasciata (Gambel, W, 1845) — interior California from Lake County (northern Central Valley) south to the San Francisco Bay region, then south along the coast to San Luis Obispo County
- Chamaea fasciata henshawi Ridgway, R, 1882 — interior of northern California (inner Coast Ranges and Sierra Nevada) and coastal southern California to northwestern Baja California, Mexico

The subspecies vary in plumage tone and color, following Gloger's rule with darker, browner birds in the more humid northwest of the range, and paler, grayer birds in the drier interior and south.

== Ecology ==
Wrentits mate for life, forming pair bonds only a few months after hatching. Both sexes sing; the faster rhythm of the male's song is one of the few ways to differentiate the sexes. Both sexes also defend their territory year-round and participate in building the nest, a four-stage process that takes about two weeks. The three or four eggs are incubated for 14 days, again by both sexes. The chicks fledge after 15 days (at which stage they are unable to fly) and are fed by their parents for another 40 days.

The wrentit feeds by skulking through dense scrub gleaning exposed insects found by sight. It feeds primarily on beetles, caterpillars, bugs, and ants, but also takes small berries and seeds.
