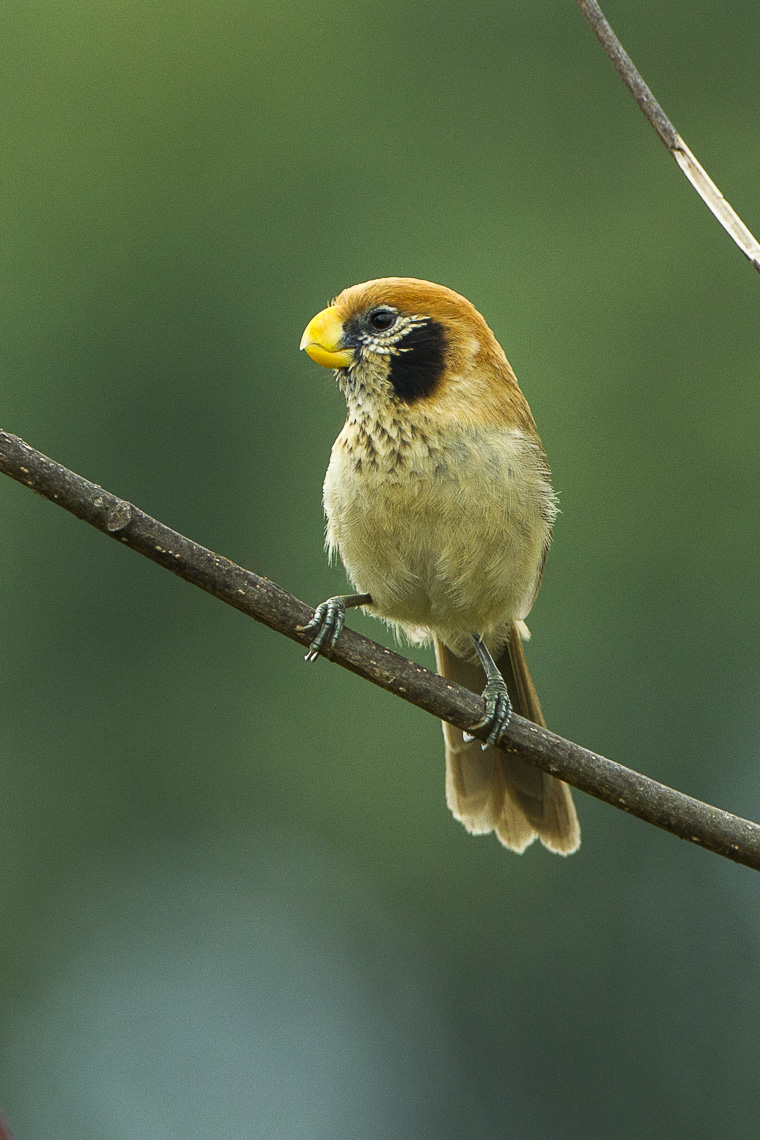
- Spot-breasted parrotbill (Paradoxornis guttaticollis)

Scientific classification
- Kingdom: Animalia
- Phylum: Chordata
- Class: Aves
- Order: Passeriformes
- Family: Paradoxornithidae
- Genus: Paradoxornis; Gould, 1836

Type species
- Paradoxornis flavirostris

= Paradoxornis =

Genus of birds

Paradoxornis is a genus of passerine birds in the parrotbill family Paradoxornithidae that are native to East, Southeast and South Asia.

== Taxonomy ==
The genus Paradoxornis was introduced in 1836 by the English ornithologist John Gould to accommodate a single species, Paradoxornis flavirostris Gould, the black-breasted parrotbill. This is the type species of the genus. The genus name combines the Ancient Greek παραδοξος/paradoxos meaning "extraordinary" with ορνις/ornis, ορνιθος/ornithos meaning "bird".

Based on the results molecular phylogenetic study published in 2019, the genus now includes species that were previously placed in the genera Calamornis, Conostoma, Cholornis, and Psittiparus.

== Species ==
The genus contains the following ten species:

Image	Common name	Scientific name	Distribution
	Reed parrotbill	Paradoxornis heudei	east Mongolia to east, northeast China and southeast Russia
	Black-breasted parrotbill	Paradoxornis flavirostris	Himalayas, northeast India
	Spot-breasted parrotbill	Paradoxornis guttaticollis	northeast India to northwest Thailand and south China
	Great parrotbill	Paradoxornis aemodius	Himalayas, northeast Myanmar to central China
	Brown parrotbill	Paradoxornis unicolor	Himalayas to south China
	Three-toed parrotbill	Paradoxornis paradoxus	China
	Grey-headed parrotbill	Paradoxornis gularis	Himalayas to north Vietnam
	Black-headed parrotbill	Paradoxornis margaritae	south Vietnam
	White-breasted parrotbill	Paradoxornis ruficeps	northeast India, Bhutan and adjacent south China
	Rufous-headed parrotbill	Paradoxornis bakeri	northeast India to Vietnam
