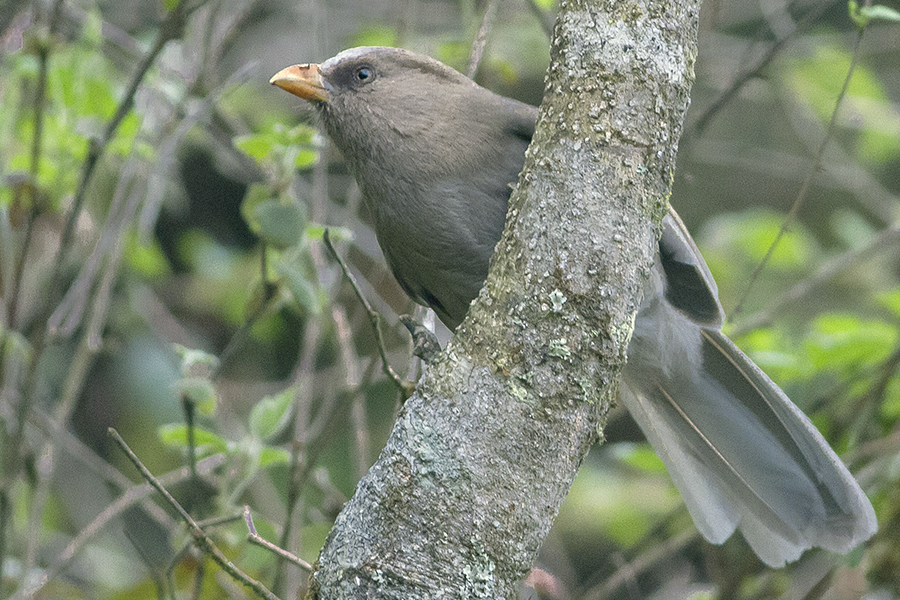
- from Pangolakha WLS, Sikkim, India.

Conservation status
- Least Concern (IUCN 3.1)

Scientific classification
- Kingdom: Animalia
- Phylum: Chordata
- Class: Aves
- Order: Passeriformes
- Family: Paradoxornithidae
- Genus: Paradoxornis
- Species: P. aemodius

Binomial name
- Paradoxornis aemodius (Hodgson, 1841)

Synonyms
- Conostoma oemodium; Conostoma aemodium

= Great parrotbill =

Species of bird

The great parrotbill (Paradoxornis aemodius) is a bird species the Paradoxornithidae family. It is found in Bhutan, China, India, Myanmar, and Nepal. It was previously placed in a monotypic genus, the Conostoma.
