= List of birds of Vietnam =

This is a list of the bird species recorded in Vietnam. The avifauna of Vietnam include a total of 963 species, of which 18 are endemic, and 5 have been introduced.

This list's taxonomic treatment (designation and sequence of orders, families and species) and nomenclature (common and scientific names) follow the conventions of The Clements Checklist of Birds of the World, 2022 edition. The family accounts at the beginning of each heading reflect this taxonomy, as do the species counts found in each family account. Introduced and accidental species are included in the total counts for Vietnam.

The following tags have been used to highlight several categories. The commonly occurring native species do not fall into any of these categories.

- (A) Accidental - a species that rarely or accidentally occurs in Vietnam
- (E) Endemic - a species endemic to Vietnam
- (I) Introduced - a species introduced to Vietnam as a consequence, direct or indirect, of human actions
- (Ex) Extirpated - a species that no longer occurs in Vietnam although populations exist elsewhere

== Ducks, geese, and waterfowl ==
Order: Anseriformes Family: Anatidae

Anatidae includes the ducks and most duck-like waterfowl, such as geese and swans. These birds are adapted to an aquatic existence with webbed feet, flattened bills, and feathers that are excellent at shedding water due to an oily coating.

- Lesser whistling-duck, Dendrocygna javanica
- Bar-headed goose, Anser indicus (A)
- Graylag goose, Anser anser
- Knob-billed duck, Sarkidiornis melanotos
- Ruddy shelduck, Tadorna ferruginea (A)
- Common shelduck, Tadorna tadorna (A)
- Cotton pygmy-goose, Nettapus coromandelianus
- Mandarin duck, Aix galericulata
- Baikal teal, Sibirionetta formosa (A)
- Garganey, Spatula querquedula
- Northern shoveler, Spatula clypeata
- Gadwall, Mareca strepera
- Falcated duck, Mareca falcata (A)
- Eurasian wigeon, Mareca penelope
- Indian spot-billed duck, Anas poecilorhyncha
- Eastern spot-billed duck, Anas zonorhyncha
- Mallard, Anas platyrhynchos (A)
- Northern pintail, Anas acuta
- Green-winged teal, Anas crecca
- White-winged duck, Asarcornis scutulata
- Red-crested pochard, Netta rufina (A)
- Common pochard, Aythya ferina
- Ferruginous duck, Aythya nyroca
- Baer's pochard, Aythya baeri
- Tufted duck, Aythya fuligula
- Greater scaup, Aythya marila (A)
- Red-breasted merganser, Mergus serrator (A)
- Scaly-sided merganser, Mergus squamatus (A)

== Pheasants, grouse, and allies ==
Order: Galliformes Family: Phasianidae

The Phasianidae are a family of terrestrial birds which consists of quails, partridges, snowcocks, francolins, spurfowls, tragopans, monals, pheasants, peafowls and jungle fowls. In general, they are plump (although they vary in size) and have broad, relatively short wings.

- Hill partridge, Arborophila torqueola
- Rufous-throated partridge, Arborophila rufogularis
- Bar-backed partridge, Arborophila brunneopectus
- Orange-necked partridge, Arborophila davidi (E)
- Scaly-breasted partridge, Tropicoperdix chloropus
  - Vietnam partridge, Tropicoperdix chloropus merlini (E)
- Chestnut-necklaced partridge, Tropicoperdix charltonii
- Chinese francolin, Francolinus pintadeanus
- Japanese quail, Coturnix japonica
- Rain quail, Coturnix coromandelica
- Blue-breasted quail, Coturnix chinensis
- Mountain bamboo-partridge, Bambusicola fytchii
- Temminck's tragopan, Tragopan temminckii
- Red junglefowl, Gallus gallus
- Edwards's pheasant, Lophura edwardsi (E)
- Silver pheasant, Lophura nycthemera
- Siamese fireback, Lophura diardi
- Ring-necked pheasant, Phasianus colchicus
- Germain's peacock-pheasant, Polyplectron germaini (E)
- Grey peacock-pheasant, Polyplectron bicalcaratum
- Vietnamese crested argus, Rheinardia ocellata
- Green peafowl, Pavo muticus

== Grebes ==
Order: Podicipediformes Family: Podicipedidae

Grebes are small to medium-large freshwater diving birds. They have lobed toes and are excellent swimmers and divers. However, they have their feet placed far back on the body, making them quite ungainly on land.

- Little grebe, Tachybaptus ruficollis
- Great crested grebe, Podiceps cristatus (A)
- Eared grebe, Podiceps nigricollis (A)

== Pigeons and doves ==
Order: Columbiformes Family: Columbidae

Pigeons and doves are stout-bodied birds with short necks and short slender bills with a fleshy cere.

- Rock pigeon, Columba livia (I)
- Ashy wood-pigeon, Columba pulchricollis (A)
- Pale-capped pigeon, Columba punicea
- Oriental turtle-dove, Streptopelia orientalis
- Red collared-dove, Streptopelia tranquebarica
- Spotted dove, Spilopelia chinensis
- Barred cuckoo-dove, Macropygia unchall
- Little cuckoo-dove, Macropygia ruficeps
- Asian emerald dove, Chalcophaps indica
- Zebra dove, Geopelia striata (A)
- Nicobar pigeon, Caloenas nicobarica
- Pink-necked green-pigeon, Treron vernans
- Orange-breasted green-pigeon, Treron bicincta
- Ashy-headed green-pigeon, Treron phyayrei
- Thick-billed green-pigeon, Treron curvirostra
- Yellow-footed green-pigeon, Treron phoenicoptera
- Yellow-vented green-pigeon, Treron seimundi
- Pin-tailed green-pigeon, Treron apicauda
- Wedge-tailed green-pigeon, Treron sphenura
- White-bellied green-pigeon, Treron sieboldii
- Green imperial-pigeon, Ducula aenea
- Mountain imperial-pigeon, Ducula badia
- Pied imperial-pigeon, Ducula bicolor

== Bustards ==
Order: Otidiformes Family: Otididae

Bustards are large terrestrial birds mainly associated with dry open country and steppes in the Old World. They are omnivorous and nest on the ground. They walk steadily on strong legs and big toes, pecking for food as they go. They have long broad wings with "fingered" wingtips and striking patterns in flight. Many have interesting mating displays.

- Bengal florican, Houbaropsis bengalensis

== Cuckoos ==
Order: Cuculiformes Family: Cuculidae

The family Cuculidae includes cuckoos, roadrunners and anis. These birds are of variable size with slender bodies, long tails and strong legs. The Old World cuckoos are brood parasites.

- Coral-billed ground-cuckoo, Carpococcyx renauldi
- Greater coucal, Centropus sinensis
- Lesser coucal, Centropus bengalensis
- Black-bellied malkoha, Phaenicophaeus diardi
- Green-billed malkoha, Phaenicophaeus tristis
- Chestnut-winged cuckoo, Clamator coromandus
- Pied cuckoo, Clamator jacobinus (A)
- Asian koel, Eudynamys scolopacea
- Asian emerald cuckoo, Chrysococcyx maculatus
- Violet cuckoo, Chrysococcyx xanthorhynchus
- Little bronze-cuckoo, Chrysococcyx minutillus
- Banded bay cuckoo, Cacomantis sonneratii
- Plaintive cuckoo, Cacomantis merulinus
- Square-tailed drongo-cuckoo, Surniculus lugubris
- Large hawk-cuckoo, Hierococcyx sparverioides
- Northern hawk-cuckoo, Hierococcyx hyperythrus (A)
- Hodgson's hawk-cuckoo, Hierococcyx nisicolor
- Lesser cuckoo, Cuculus poliocephalus
- Indian cuckoo, Cuculus micropterus
- Himalayan cuckoo, Cuculus saturatus
- Common cuckoo, Cuculus canorus
- Oriental cuckoo, Cuculus optatus

== Frogmouths ==
Order: Caprimulgiformes Family: Podargidae

The frogmouths are a group of nocturnal birds related to the nightjars. They are named for their large flattened hooked bill and huge frog-like gape, which they use to take insects.

- Hodgson's frogmouth, Batrachostomus hodgsoni
- Blyth's frogmouth, Batrachostomus affinis

== Nightjars and allies ==
Order: Caprimulgiformes Family: Caprimulgidae

Nightjars are medium-sized nocturnal birds that usually nest on the ground. They have long wings, short legs and very short bills. Most have small feet, of little use for walking, and long pointed wings. Their soft plumage is camouflaged to resemble bark or leaves.

- Great eared-nightjar, Eurostopodus macrotis
- Gray nightjar, Caprimulgus jotaka
- Large-tailed nightjar, Caprimulgus macrurus
- Indian nightjar, Caprimulgus asiaticus
- Savanna nightjar, Caprimulgus affinis

== Swifts ==
Order: Caprimulgiformes Family: Apodidae

Swifts are small birds which spend the majority of their lives flying. These birds have very short legs and never settle voluntarily on the ground, perching instead only on vertical surfaces. Many swifts have long swept-back wings which resemble a crescent or boomerang.

- White-throated needletail, Hirundapus caudacutus
- Silver-backed needletail, Hirundapus cochinchinensis
- Brown-backed needletail, Hirundapus giganteus
- Himalayan swiftlet, Aerodramus brevirostris
- Black-nest swiftlet, Aerodramus maximus
- White-nest swiftlet, Aerodramus fuciphagus
- German's swiftlet, Aerodramus germani
- Pacific swift, Apus pacificus
- Cook's swift, Apus cooki
- House swift, Apus nipalensis
- Asian palm-swift, Cypsiurus balasiensis

== Treeswifts ==
Order: Caprimulgiformes Family: Hemiprocnidae

The treeswifts, also called crested swifts, are closely related to the true swifts. They differ from the other swifts in that they have crests, long forked tails and softer plumage.

- Crested treeswift, Hemiprocne coronata

== Rails, gallinules and coots ==
Order: Gruiformes Family: Rallidae

Rallidae is a large family of small to medium-sized birds which includes the rails, crakes, coots and gallinules. Typically they inhabit dense vegetation in damp environments near lakes, swamps or rivers. In general they are shy and secretive birds, making them difficult to observe. Most species have strong legs and long toes which are well adapted to soft uneven surfaces. They tend to have short, rounded wings and to be weak fliers.

- Brown-cheeked rail, Rallus indicus
- Corn crake, Crex crex (A)
- Slaty-breasted rail, Lewinia striata
- Eurasian moorhen, Gallinula chloropus
- Eurasian coot, Fulica atra
- Gray-headed swamphen, Porphyrio poliocephalus
- Watercock, Gallicrex cinerea
- White-breasted waterhen, Amaurornis phoenicurus
- White-browed crake, Poliolimnas cinereus
- Red-legged crake, Rallina fasciata
- Slaty-legged crake, Rallina eurizonoides
- Ruddy-breasted crake, Zapornia fusca
- Band-bellied crake, Zapornia paykullii
- Brown crake, Zapornia akool
- Baillon's crake, Zapornia pusilla
- Black-tailed crake, Zapornia bicolor

== Finfoots ==
Order: Gruiformes Family: Heliornithidae

Heliornithidae is a small family of tropical birds with webbed lobes on their feet similar to those of grebes and coots.

- Masked finfoot, Heliopais personata

== Cranes ==
Order: Gruiformes Family: Gruidae

Cranes are large, long-legged and long-necked birds. Unlike the similar-looking but unrelated herons, cranes fly with necks outstretched, not pulled back. Most have elaborate and noisy courting displays or "dances".

- Sarus crane, Antigone antigone
- Common crane, Grus grus
- Black-necked crane, Grus nigricollis

== Thick-knees ==
Order: Charadriiformes Family: Burhinidae

The thick-knees are a group of largely tropical waders in the family Burhinidae. They are found worldwide within the tropical zone, with some species also breeding in temperate Europe and Australia. They are medium to large waders with strong black or yellow-black bills, large yellow eyes and cryptic plumage. Despite being classed as waders, most species have a preference for arid or semi-arid habitats.

- Indian thick-knee, Burhinus indicus
- Great thick-knee, Esacus recurvirostris

== Stilts and avocets ==
Order: Charadriiformes Family: Recurvirostridae

Recurvirostridae is a family of large wading birds, which includes the avocets and stilts. The avocets have long legs and long up-curved bills. The stilts have extremely long legs and long, thin, straight bills.

- Black-winged stilt, Himantopus himantopus
- Pied avocet, Recurvirostra avosetta (A)

== Oystercatchers ==
Order: Charadriiformes Family: Haematopodidae

The oystercatchers are large and noisy plover-like birds, with strong bills used for smashing or prising open molluscs.

- Eurasian oystercatcher, Haematopus ostralegus (A)

== Plovers and lapwings ==
Order: Charadriiformes Family: Charadriidae

The family Charadriidae includes the plovers, dotterels and lapwings. They are small to medium-sized birds with compact bodies, short, thick necks and long, usually pointed, wings. They are found in open country worldwide, mostly in habitats near water.

- Black-bellied plover, Pluvialis squatarola
- Pacific golden-plover, Pluvialis fulva
- Northern lapwing, Vanellus vanellus
- River lapwing, Vanellus duvaucelii
- Gray-headed lapwing, Vanellus cinereus
- Red-wattled lapwing, Vanellus indicus
- Lesser sand-plover, Charadrius mongolus
- Greater sand-plover, Charadrius leschenaultii
- Malaysian plover, Charadrius peronii
- Kentish plover, Charadrius alexandrinus
- White-faced plover, Charadrius dealbatus
- Common ringed plover, Charadrius hiaticula (A)
- Long-billed plover, Charadrius placidus
- Little ringed plover, Charadrius dubius
- Oriental plover, Charadrius veredus

== Painted-snipes ==
Order: Charadriiformes Family: Rostratulidae

Painted-snipes are short-legged, long-billed birds similar in shape to the true snipes, but more brightly coloured.

- Greater painted-snipe, Rostratula benghalensis

== Jacanas ==
Order: Charadriiformes Family: Jacanidae

The jacanas are a group of tropical waders in the family Jacanidae. They are found throughout the tropics. They are identifiable by their huge feet and claws which enable them to walk on floating vegetation in the shallow lakes that are their preferred habitat.

- Pheasant-tailed jacana, Hydrophasianus chirurgus
- Bronze-winged jacana, Metopidius indicus

== Sandpipers and allies ==
Order: Charadriiformes Family: Scolopacidae

Scolopacidae is a large diverse family of small to medium-sized shorebirds including the sandpipers, curlews, godwits, shanks, tattlers, woodcocks, snipes, dowitchers and phalaropes. The majority of these species eat small invertebrates picked out of the mud or soil. Variation in length of legs and bills enables multiple species to feed in the same habitat, particularly on the coast, without direct competition for food.

- Whimbrel, Numenius phaeopus
- Far Eastern curlew, Numenius madagascariensis
- Eurasian curlew, Numenius arquata
- Bar-tailed godwit, Limosa lapponica
- Black-tailed godwit, Limosa limosa
- Ruddy turnstone, Arenaria interpres
- Great knot, Calidris tenuirostris
- Red knot, Calidris canutus
- Ruff, Calidris pugnax
- Broad-billed sandpiper, Calidris falcinellus
- Sharp-tailed sandpiper, Calidris acuminata (A)
- Curlew sandpiper, Calidris ferruginea
- Temminck's stint, Calidris temminckii
- Long-toed stint, Calidris subminuta
- Spoon-billed sandpiper, Calidris pygmea (A)
- Red-necked stint, Calidris ruficollis
- Sanderling, Calidris alba
- Dunlin, Calidris alpina
- Little stint, Calidris minuta (A)
- Pectoral sandpiper, Calidris melanotos (A)
- Asian dowitcher, Limnodromus semipalmatus
- Long-billed dowitcher, Limnodromus scolopaceus (A)
- Jack snipe, Lymnocryptes minimus
- Eurasian woodcock, Scolopax rusticola
- Solitary snipe, Gallinago solitaria (A)
- Wood snipe, Gallinago nemoricola
- Common snipe, Gallinago gallinago
- Pin-tailed snipe, Gallinago stenura
- Swinhoe's snipe, Gallinago megala
- Terek sandpiper, Xenus cinereus
- Red-necked phalarope, Phalaropus lobatus
- Common sandpiper, Actitis hypoleucos
- Green sandpiper, Tringa ochropus
- Gray-tailed tattler, Tringa brevipes
- Spotted redshank, Tringa erythropus
- Common greenshank, Tringa nebularia
- Nordmann's greenshank, Tringa guttifer
- Marsh sandpiper, Tringa stagnatilis
- Wood sandpiper, Tringa glareola
- Common redshank, Tringa totanus

== Buttonquail ==
Order: Charadriiformes Family: Turnicidae

The buttonquail are small, drab, running birds which resemble the true quails. The female is the brighter of the sexes and initiates courtship. The male incubates the eggs and tends the young.

- Small buttonquail, Turnix sylvatica
- Yellow-legged buttonquail, Turnix tanki
- Barred buttonquail, Turnix suscitator

== Pratincoles and coursers ==
Order: Charadriiformes Family: Glareolidae

Glareolidae is a family of wading birds comprising the pratincoles, which have short legs, long pointed wings and long forked tails, and the coursers, which have long legs, short wings and long, pointed bills which curve downwards.

- Oriental pratincole, Glareola maldivarum
- Small pratincole, Glareola lactea (A)

== Skuas and jaegers ==
Order: Charadriiformes Family: Stercorariidae

The family Stercorariidae are, in general, medium to large birds, typically with grey or brown plumage, often with white markings on the wings. They nest on the ground in temperate and arctic regions and are long-distance migrants.

- Pomarine jaeger, Stercorarius pomarinus
- Parasitic jaeger, Stercorarius parasiticus

== Auks, murres, and puffins ==
Order: Charadriiformes Family: Alcidae

Alcids are superficially similar to penguins due to their black-and-white colors, their upright posture and some of their habits, however they are not related to the penguins and differ in being able to fly. Auks live on the open sea, only deliberately coming ashore to nest.

- Ancient murrelet, Synthliboramphus antiquus (A)

== Gulls, terns, and skimmers ==
Order: Charadriiformes Family: Laridae

Laridae is a family of medium to large seabirds, the gulls, terns, and skimmers. Gulls are typically grey or white, often with black markings on the head or wings. They have stout, longish bills and webbed feet. Terns are a group of generally medium to large seabirds typically with grey or white plumage, often with black markings on the head. Most terns hunt fish by diving but some pick insects off the surface of fresh water. Terns are generally long-lived birds, with several species known to live in excess of 30 years.

- Saunders's gull, Saundersilarus saundersi
- Black-headed gull, Chroicocephalus ridibundus
- Brown-headed gull, Chroicocephalus brunnicephalus
- Relict gull, Ichthyaetus relictus (A)
- Pallas's gull, Ichthyaetus ichthyaetus
- Black-tailed gull, Larus crassirostris
- Common gull, Larus canus (A)
- Herring gull, Larus argentatus
- Caspian gull, Larus cachinnans
- Lesser black-backed gull, Larus fuscus
- Brown noddy, Anous stolidus (A)
- Blue-billed white tern, Gygis candida
- Sooty tern, Onychoprion fuscatus
- Bridled tern, Onychoprion anaethetus
- Little tern, Sternula albifrons
- Gull-billed tern, Gelochelidon nilotica
- Caspian tern, Hydroprogne caspia
- White-winged tern, Chlidonias leucopterus
- Whiskered tern, Chlidonias hybrida
- Roseate tern, Sterna dougallii
- Black-naped tern, Sterna sumatrana
- Common tern, Sterna hirundo
- Arctic tern, Sterna paradisaea (A)
- Black-bellied tern, Sterna acuticauda (A)
- River tern, Sterna aurantia
- Great crested tern, Thalasseus bergii
- Lesser crested tern, Thalasseus bengalensis (A)

== Tropicbirds ==
Order: Phaethontiformes Family: Phaethontidae

Tropicbirds are slender white birds of tropical oceans, with exceptionally long central tail feathers. Their heads and long wings have black markings.

- Red-billed tropicbird, Phaethon aethereus

== Northern storm-petrels ==
Order: Procellariiformes Family: Hydrobatidae

The northern storm-petrels are relatives of the petrels and are the smallest seabirds. They feed on planktonic crustaceans and small fish picked from the surface, typically while hovering. The flight is fluttering and sometimes bat-like.

- Swinhoe's storm-petrel, Hydrobates monorhis

== Shearwaters and petrels ==
Order: Procellariiformes Family: Procellariidae

The procellariids are the main group of medium-sized "true petrels", characterized by united nostrils with medium septum and a long outer functional primary.

- Streaked shearwater, Calonectris leucomelas (A)
- Wedge-tailed shearwater, Ardenna pacifica (A)
- Christmas shearwater, Puffinus nativitatis (A)

== Storks ==
Order: Ciconiiformes Family: Ciconiidae

Storks are large, long-legged, long-necked, wading birds with long, stout bills. Storks are mute, but bill-clattering is an important mode of communication at the nest. Their nests can be large and may be reused for many years. Many species are migratory.

- Asian openbill, Anastomus oscitans
- Black stork, Ciconia nigra
- Asian woolly-necked stork, Ciconia episcopus
- Black-necked stork, Ephippiorhynchus asiaticus
- Lesser adjutant, Leptoptilos javanicus
- Greater adjutant, Leptoptilos dubius
- Milky stork, Mycteria cinerea
- Painted stork, Mycteria leucocephala

== Frigatebirds ==
Order: Suliformes Family: Fregatidae

Frigatebirds are large seabirds usually found over tropical oceans. They are large, black-and-white or completely black, with long wings and deeply forked tails. The males have coloured inflatable throat pouches. They do not swim or walk and cannot take off from a flat surface. Having the largest wingspan-to-body-weight ratio of any bird, they are essentially aerial, able to stay aloft for more than a week.

- Lesser frigatebird, Fregata ariel (A)
- Christmas Island frigatebird, Fregata andrewsi (A)
- Great frigatebird, Fregata minor (A)

== Boobies and gannets ==
Order: Suliformes Family: Sulidae

The sulids comprise the gannets and boobies. Both groups are medium to large coastal seabirds that plunge-dive for fish.

- Masked booby, Sula dactylatra (A)
- Brown booby, Sula leucogaster
- Red-footed booby, Sula sula

== Anhingas ==
Order: Suliformes Family: Anhingidae

Anhingas or darters are often called "snake-birds" because of their long thin neck, which gives a snake-like appearance when they swim with their bodies submerged. The males have black and dark-brown plumage, an erectile crest on the nape and a larger bill than the female. The females have much paler plumage especially on the neck and underparts. The darters have completely webbed feet and their legs are short and set far back on the body. Their plumage is somewhat permeable, like that of cormorants, and they spread their wings to dry after diving.

- Oriental darter, Anhinga melanogaster

== Cormorants and shags ==
Order: Suliformes Family: Phalacrocoracidae

Phalacrocoracidae is a family of medium to large coastal, fish-eating seabirds that includes cormorants and shags. Plumage colouration varies, with the majority having mainly dark plumage, some species being black-and-white and a few being colourful.

- Little cormorant, Microcarbo niger
- Great cormorant, Phalacrocorax carbo
- Indian cormorant, Phalacrocorax fuscicollis

== Pelicans ==
Order: Pelecaniformes Family: Pelecanidae

Pelicans are large water birds with a distinctive pouch under their beak. As with other members of the order Pelecaniformes, they have webbed feet with four toes.

- Great white pelican, Pelecanus onocrotalus (A)
- Spot-billed pelican, Pelecanus philippensis (A)

== Herons, egrets, and bitterns ==
Order: Pelecaniformes Family: Ardeidae

The family Ardeidae contains the bitterns, herons and egrets. Herons and egrets are medium to large wading birds with long necks and legs. Bitterns tend to be shorter necked and more wary. Members of Ardeidae fly with their necks retracted, unlike other long-necked birds such as storks, ibises and spoonbills.

- Great bittern, Botaurus stellaris
- Yellow bittern, Ixobrychus sinensis
- Schrenck's bittern, Ixobrychus eurhythmus
- Cinnamon bittern, Ixobrychus cinnamomeus
- Black bittern, Ixobrychus flavicollis
- Gray heron, Ardea cinerea
- Great-billed heron, Ardea sumatrana
- Purple heron, Ardea purpurea
- Great egret, Ardea alba
- Intermediate egret, Ardea intermedia
- Chinese egret, Egretta eulophotes
- Little egret, Egretta garzetta
- Pacific reef-heron, Egretta sacra
- Eastern cattle egret, Ardea coromanda
- Chinese pond-heron, Ardeola bacchus
- Javan pond-heron, Ardeola speciosa
- Striated heron, Butorides striata
- Black-crowned night-heron, Nycticorax nycticorax
- White-eared night-heron, Gorsachius magnificus
- Malayan night-heron, Gorsachius melanolophus

== Ibises and spoonbills ==
Order: Pelecaniformes Family: Threskiornithidae

Threskiornithidae is a family of large terrestrial and wading birds which includes the ibises and spoonbills. They have long, broad wings with 11 primary and about 20 secondary feathers. They are strong fliers and despite their size and weight, very capable soarers.

- Glossy ibis, Plegadis falcinellus
- Black-headed ibis, Threskiornis melanocephalus
- White-shouldered ibis, Pseudibis davisoni (Ex) (Note: Extirpated according to IUCN)
- Giant ibis, Pseudibis gigantea (A) (Note: Resident according to IUCN)
- Eurasian spoonbill, Platalea leucorodia (A)
- Black-faced spoonbill, Platalea minor

== Osprey ==
Order: Accipitriformes Family: Pandionidae

The family Pandionidae contains only one species, the osprey. The osprey is a medium-large raptor which is a specialist fish-eater with a worldwide distribution.

- Osprey, Pandion haliaetus

== Hawks, eagles, and kites ==
Order: Accipitriformes Family: Accipitridae

Accipitridae is a family of birds of prey, which includes hawks, eagles, kites, harriers and Old World vultures. These birds have powerful hooked beaks for tearing flesh from their prey, strong legs, powerful talons and keen eyesight.

- Black-winged kite, Elanus caeruleus
- Oriental honey-buzzard, Pernis ptilorhynchus
- Jerdon's baza, Aviceda jerdoni
- Black baza, Aviceda leuphotes
- Red-headed vulture, Sarcogyps calvus
- Cinereous vulture, Aegypius monachus
- White-rumped vulture, Gyps bengalensis (Ex?)
- Indian vulture, Gyps indicus
- Crested serpent-eagle, Spilornis cheela
- Short-toed snake-eagle, Circaetus gallicus
- Changeable hawk-eagle, Nisaetus cirrhatus
- Mountain hawk-eagle, Nisaetus nipalensis
- Rufous-bellied eagle, Lophotriorchis kienerii
- Black eagle, Ictinaetus malaiensis
- Greater spotted eagle, Clanga clanga
- Booted eagle, Hieraaetus pennatus (A)
- Steppe eagle, Aquila nipalensis (A)
- Imperial eagle, Aquila heliaca (A)
- Bonelli's eagle, Aquila fasciata
- Rufous-winged buzzard, Butastur liventer
- Gray-faced buzzard, Butastur indicus
- Eurasian marsh-harrier, Circus aeruginosus
- Eastern marsh-harrier, Circus spilonotus
- Hen harrier, Circus cyaneus (A)
- Pallid harrier, Circus macrourus (A)
- Pied harrier, Circus melanoleucos
- Crested goshawk, Accipiter trivirgatus
- Shikra, Accipiter badius
- Chinese sparrowhawk, Accipiter soloensis
- Japanese sparrowhawk, Accipiter gularis
- Besra, Accipiter virgatus
- Eurasian sparrowhawk, Accipiter nisus
- Northern goshawk, Astur gentilis
- Black kite, Milvus migrans
- Brahminy kite, Haliastur indus
- White-tailed eagle, Haliaeetus albicilla (A)
- Pallas's fish-eagle, Haliaeetus leucoryphus (A)
- White-bellied sea-eagle, Haliaeetus leucogaster
- Lesser fish-eagle, Haliaeetus humilis
- Gray-headed fish-eagle, Haliaeetus ichthyaetus
- Common buzzard, Buteo buteo
- Himalayan buzzard, Buteo refectus (A)
- Eastern buzzard, Buteo japonicus

== Barn-owls ==
Order: Strigiformes Family: Tytonidae

Barn owls are medium to large owls with large heads and characteristic heart-shaped faces. They have long strong legs with powerful talons.

- Australasian grass-owl, Tyto longimembris
- Eastern barn owl, Tyto javanica
- Oriental bay-owl, Phodilus badius

== Owls ==
Order: Strigiformes Family: Strigidae

The typical owls are small to large solitary nocturnal birds of prey. They have large forward-facing eyes and ears, a hawk-like beak and a conspicuous circle of feathers around each eye called a facial disk.

- Mountain scops-owl, Otus spilocephalus
- Collared scops-owl, Otus lettia
- Sunda scops-owl, Otus lempiji
- Oriental scops-owl, Otus sunia
- Spot-bellied eagle-owl, Bubo nipalensis
- Brown fish-owl, Ketupa zeylonensis
- Tawny fish-owl, Ketupa flavipes
- Buffy fish-owl, Ketupa ketupu
- Collared owlet, Taenioptynx brodiei
- Asian barred owlet, Glaucidium cuculoides
- Spotted owlet, Athene brama
- Spotted wood-owl, Strix seloputo
- Brown wood-owl, Strix leptogrammica
- Himalayan owl, Strix nivicolum
- Long-eared owl, Asio otus (A)
- Short-eared owl, Asio flammeus
- Brown boobook, Ninox scutulata
- Northern boobook, Ninox japonica (A)

== Trogons ==
Order: Trogoniformes Family: Trogonidae

The family Trogonidae includes trogons and quetzals. Found in tropical woodlands worldwide, they feed on insects and fruit, and their broad bills and weak legs reflect their diet and arboreal habits. Although their flight is fast, they are reluctant to fly any distance. Trogons have soft, often colourful, feathers with distinctive male and female plumage.

- Red-headed trogon, Harpactes erythrocephalus
- Orange-breasted trogon, Harpactes oreskios
- Ward's trogon, Harpactes wardi

== Hoopoes ==
Order: Bucerotiformes Family: Upupidae

Hoopoes have black, white and orangey-pink colouring with a large erectile crest on their head.

- Eurasian hoopoe, Upupa epops

== Hornbills ==
Order: Bucerotiformes Family: Bucerotidae

Hornbills are a group of birds whose bill is shaped like a cow's horn, but without a twist, sometimes with a casque on the upper mandible. Frequently, the bill is brightly coloured.

- White-crowned hornbill, Berenicornis comatus
- Great hornbill, Buceros bicornis
- Brown hornbill, Anorrhinus austeni
- Black hornbill, Anthracoceros malayanus
- Oriental pied-hornbill, Anthracoceros albirostris
- Rufous-necked hornbill, Aceros nipalensis
- Wreathed hornbill, Rhyticeros undulatus

== Kingfishers ==
Order: Coraciiformes Family: Alcedinidae

Kingfishers are medium-sized birds with large heads, long, pointed bills, short legs and stubby tails.

- Blyth's kingfisher, Alcedo hercules
- Common kingfisher, Alcedo atthis
- Blue-eared kingfisher, Alcedo meninting
- Black-backed dwarf-kingfisher, Ceyx erithaca
- Banded kingfisher, Lacedo pulchella
- Stork-billed kingfisher, Pelargopsis capensis
- Ruddy kingfisher, Halcyon coromanda
- White-throated kingfisher, Halcyon smyrnensis
- Black-capped kingfisher, Halcyon pileata
- Collared kingfisher, Todirhamphus chloris
- Crested kingfisher, Megaceryle lugubris
- Pied kingfisher, Ceryle rudis

== Bee-eaters ==
Order: Coraciiformes Family: Meropidae

The bee-eaters are a group of near passerine birds in the family Meropidae. Most species are found in Africa but others occur in southern Europe, Madagascar, Australia and New Guinea. They are characterised by richly coloured plumage, slender bodies and usually elongated central tail feathers. All are colourful and have long downturned bills and pointed wings, which give them a swallow-like appearance when seen from afar.

- Blue-bearded bee-eater, Nyctyornis athertoni
- Asian green bee-eater, Merops orientalis
- Blue-throated bee-eater, Merops viridis
- Blue-tailed bee-eater, Merops philippinus
- Chestnut-headed bee-eater, Merops leschenaultia

== Rollers ==
Order: Coraciiformes Family: Coraciidae

Rollers resemble crows in size and build, but are more closely related to the kingfishers and bee-eaters. They share the colourful appearance of those groups with blues and browns predominating. The two inner front toes are connected, but the outer toe is not.

- Indochinese roller, Coracias affinis
- Dollarbird, Eurystomus orientalis

== Asian barbets ==
Order: Piciformes Family: Megalaimidae

The Asian barbets are plump birds, with short necks and large heads. They get their name from the bristles which fringe their heavy bills. Most species are brightly coloured.

- Coppersmith barbet, Psilopogon haemacephalus
- Blue-eared barbet, Psilopogon duvaucelii
- Great barbet, Psilopogon virens
- Red-vented barbet, Psilopogon lagrandieri
- Green-eared barbet, Psilopogon faiostrictus
- Lineated barbet, Psilopogon lineatus
- Golden-throated barbet, Psilopogon franklinii
- Necklaced barbet, Psilopogon auricularis
- Moustached barbet, Psilopogon incognitus
- Blue-throated barbet, Psilopogon asiaticus
- Indochinese barbet, Psilopogon annamensis

== Woodpeckers ==
Order: Piciformes Family: Picidae

Woodpeckers are small to medium-sized birds with chisel-like beaks, short legs, stiff tails and long tongues used for capturing insects. Some species have feet with two toes pointing forward and two backward, while several species have only three toes. Many woodpeckers have the habit of tapping noisily on tree trunks with their beaks.

- Eurasian wryneck, Jynx torquilla
- Speckled piculet, Picumnus innominatus
- White-browed piculet, Sasia ochracea
- Heart-spotted woodpecker, Hemicircus canente
- Gray-capped pygmy woodpecker, Yungipicus canicapillus
- Yellow-crowned woodpecker, Leiopicus mahrattensis
- Rufous-bellied woodpecker, Dendrocopos hyperythrus
- Freckle-breasted woodpecker, Dendrocopos analis
- Stripe-breasted woodpecker, Dendrocopos atratus
- Darjeeling woodpecker, Dendrocopos darjellensis
- Great spotted woodpecker, Dendrocopos major
- Crimson-breasted woodpecker, Dryobates cathpharius
- Bay woodpecker, Blythipicus pyrrhotis
- Greater flameback, Chrysocolaptes guttacristatus
- Rufous woodpecker, Micropternus brachyurus
- Black-and-buff woodpecker, Meiglyptes jugularis
- Pale-headed woodpecker, Gecinulus grantia
- Common flameback, Dinopium javanense
- Lesser yellownape, Picus chlorolophus
- Streak-throated woodpecker, Picus xanthopygaeus
- Red-collared woodpecker, Picus rabieri
- Laced woodpecker, Picus vittatus
- Gray-headed woodpecker, Picus canus
- Black-headed woodpecker, Picus erythropygius
- Greater yellownape, Chrysophlegma flavinucha
- Great slaty woodpecker, Mulleripicus pulverulentus
- White-bellied woodpecker, Dryocopus javensis

== Falcons ==
Order: Falconiformes Family: Falconidae

Falconidae is a family of diurnal birds of prey. They differ from hawks, eagles and kites in that they kill with their beaks instead of their talons.

- White-rumped falcon, Polihierax insignis
- Collared falconet, Microhierax caerulescens
- Pied falconet, Microhierax melanoleucus
- Eurasian kestrel, Falco tinnunculus
- Amur falcon, Falco amurensis
- Merlin, Falco columbarius (A)
- Eurasian hobby, Falco subbuteo
- Oriental hobby, Falco severus
- Laggar falcon, Falco jugger
- Peregrine falcon, Falco peregrinus

== Old World parrots ==
Order: Psittaciformes Family: Psittaculidae

Parrots are small to large birds with a characteristic curved beak. Their upper mandibles have slight mobility in the joint with the skull and they have a generally erect stance. All parrots are zygodactyl, having the four toes on each foot placed two at the front and two to the back.

- Blue-rumped parrot, Psittinus cyanurus
- Alexandrine parakeet, Psittacula eupatria
- Rose-ringed parakeet, Psittacula krameri (I)
- Gray-headed parakeet, Psittacula finschii
- Blossom-headed parakeet, Psittacula roseata
- Red-breasted parakeet, Psittacula alexandri
- Long-tailed parakeet, Psittacula longicauda
- Vernal hanging-parrot, Loriculus vernalis

== Asian and Grauer's broadbills ==
Order: Passeriformes Family: Eurylaimidae

The broadbills are small, brightly coloured birds, which feed on fruit and also take insects in flycatcher fashion, snapping their broad bills. Their habitat is canopies of wet forests.

- Black-and-red broadbill, Cymbirhynchus macrorhynchos
- Long-tailed broadbill, Psarisomus dalhousiae
- Silver-breasted broadbill, Serilophus lunatus
- Banded broadbill, Eurylaimus javanicus
- Dusky broadbill, Corydon sumatranus

== Pittas ==
Order: Passeriformes Family: Pittidae

Pittas are medium-sized by passerine standards and are stocky, with fairly long, strong legs, short tails and stout bills. Many are brightly coloured. They spend the majority of their time on wet forest floors, eating snails, insects and similar invertebrates.

- Eared pitta, Hydrornis phayrei
- Rusty-naped pitta, Hydrornis oatesi
- Blue-naped pitta, Hydrornis nipalensis
- Blue-rumped pitta, Hydrornis soror
- Blue pitta, Hydrornis cyanea
- Bar-bellied pitta, Hydrornis elliotii
- Blue-winged pitta, Pitta moluccensis
- Fairy pitta, Pitta nympha
- Hooded pitta, Pitta sordida

== Thornbills and allies ==
Order: Passeriformes Family: Acanthizidae

Thornbills are small passerine birds, similar in habits to the tits.

- Golden-bellied gerygone, Gerygone sulphurea

== Cuckooshrikes ==
Order: Passeriformes Family: Campephagidae

The cuckooshrikes are small to medium-sized passerine birds. They are predominantly greyish with white and black, although some species are brightly coloured.

- Small minivet, Pericrocotus cinnamomeus
- Gray-chinned minivet, Pericrocotus solaris
- Short-billed minivet, Pericrocotus brevirostris
- Long-tailed minivet, Pericrocotus ethologus
- Scarlet minivet, Pericrocotus flammeus
- Ashy minivet, Pericrocotus divaricatus
- Brown-rumped minivet, Pericrocotus cantonensis
- Rosy minivet, Pericrocotus roseus
- Large cuckooshrike, Coracina macei
- Black-winged cuckooshrike, Lalage melaschistos
- Indochinese cuckooshrike, Lalage polioptera

== Vireos, shrike-babblers, and erpornis ==
Order: Passeriformes Family: Vireonidae

Most of the members of this family are found in the New World. However, the shrike-babblers and erpornis, which only slightly resemble the "true" vireos and greenlets, are found in South East Asia.

- Black-headed shrike-babbler, Pteruthius rufiventer
- White-browed shrike-babbler, Pteruthius aeralatus
- Green shrike-babbler, Pteruthius xanthochlorus (A)
- Black-eared shrike-babbler, Pteruthius melanotis
- Clicking shrike-babbler, Pteruthius intermedius
- White-bellied erpornis, Erpornis zantholeuca

== Whistlers ==
Order: Passeriformes Family: Pachycephalidae

The family Pachycephalidae includes the whistlers, shrikethrushes, shrikethrushes, and some of the pitohuis.

- Mangrove whistler, Pachycephala cinerea

== Old World orioles ==
Order: Passeriformes Family: Oriolidae

The Old World orioles are colourful passerine birds. They are not related to the New World orioles.

- Black-naped oriole, Oriolus chinensis
- Slender-billed oriole, Oriolus tenuirostris
- Black-hooded oriole, Oriolus xanthornus
- Maroon oriole, Oriolus traillii
- Silver oriole, Oriolus mellianus (A)

== Woodswallows ==
Order: Passeriformes Family: Artamidae

The woodswallows are soft-plumaged, somber-coloured passerine birds. They are smooth, agile flyers with moderately large, semi-triangular wings.

- Ashy woodswallow, Artamus fuscus

== Vangas, helmetshrikes, and allies ==
Order: Passeriformes Family: Vangidae

The family Vangidae is highly variable, though most members of it resemble true shrikes to some degree.

- Large woodshrike, Tephrodornis gularis
- Common woodshrike, Tephrodornis pondicerianus
- Bar-winged flycatcher-shrike, Hemipus picatus

== Ioras ==
Order: Passeriformes Family: Aegithinidae

The ioras are bulbul-like birds of open forest or thorn scrub, but whereas that group tends to be drab in colouration, ioras are sexually dimorphic, with the males being brightly plumaged in yellows and greens.

- Common iora, Aegithina tiphia
- Great iora, Aegithina lafresnayei

== Fantails ==
Order: Passeriformes Family: Rhipiduridae

The fantails are small insectivorous birds which are specialist aerial feeders.

- Malaysian pied-fantail, Rhipidura javanica
- White-throated fantail, Rhipidura albicollis
- White-browed fantail, Rhipidura aureola

== Drongos ==
Order: Passeriformes Family: Dicruridae

The drongos are mostly black or dark grey in colour, sometimes with metallic tints. They have long forked tails, and some Asian species have elaborate tail decorations. They have short legs and sit very upright when perched, like a shrike. They flycatch or take prey from the ground.

- Black drongo, Dicrurus macrocercus
- Ashy drongo, Dicrurus leucophaeus
- Crow-billed drongo, Dicrurus annectens
- Bronzed drongo, Dicrurus aeneus
- Lesser racket-tailed drongo, Dicrurus remifer
- Hair-crested drongo, Dicrurus hottentottus
- Greater racket-tailed drongo, Dicrurus paradiseus

== Monarch flycatchers ==
Order: Passeriformes Family: Monarchidae

The monarch flycatchers are small to medium-sized insectivorous passerines which hunt by flycatching.

- Black-naped monarch, Hypothymis azurea
- Japanese paradise-flycatcher, Terpsiphone atrocaudata
- Amur paradise-flycatcher, Terpsiphone incei
- Blyth's paradise-flycatcher, Terpsiphone affinis

== Shrikes ==
Order: Passeriformes Family: Laniidae

Shrikes are passerine birds known for their habit of catching other birds and small animals and impaling the uneaten portions of their bodies on thorns. A typical shrike's beak is hooked, like a bird of prey.

- Tiger shrike, Lanius tigrinus
- Bull-headed shrike, Lanius bucephalus (A)
- Brown shrike, Lanius cristatus
- Burmese shrike, Lanius collurioides
- Long-tailed shrike, Lanius schach
- Gray-backed shrike, Lanius tephronotus

== Crows, jays, and magpies ==
Order: Passeriformes Family: Corvidae

The family Corvidae includes crows, ravens, jays, choughs, magpies, treepies, nutcrackers and ground jays. Corvids are above average in size among the Passeriformes, and some of the larger species show high levels of intelligence.

- Eurasian jay, Garrulus glandarius
- Yellow-billed blue-magpie, Urocissa flavirostris
- Red-billed blue-magpie, Urocissa erythrorhyncha
- White-winged magpie, Urocissa whiteheadi
- Common green-magpie, Cissa chinensis
- Indochinese green-magpie, Cissa hypoleuca
- Rufous treepie, Dendrocitta vagabunda
- Gray treepie, Dendrocitta formosae
- Collared treepie, Dendrocitta frontalis
- Racket-tailed treepie, Crypsirina temia
- Ratchet-tailed treepie, Temnurus temnurus
- Oriental magpie, Pica serica
- Eurasian magpie, Pica pica
- Eurasian nutcracker, Nucifraga caryocatactes
- House crow, Corvus splendens (I)
- Carrion crow, Corvus corone (A)
- Large-billed crow, Corvus macrorhynchos
- Collared crow, Corvus torquatus

== Fairy flycatchers ==
Order: Passeriformes Family: Stenostiridae

Most of the species of this small family are found in Africa, though a few inhabit tropical Asia. They are not closely related to other birds called "flycatchers".

- Yellow-bellied fairy-fantail, Chelidorhynx hypoxanthus
- Gray-headed canary-flycatcher, Culicicapa ceylonensis

== Tits, chickadees, and titmice ==
Order: Passeriformes Family: Paridae

The Paridae are mainly small stocky woodland species with short stout bills. Some have crests. They are adaptable birds, with a mixed diet including seeds and insects.

- Yellow-browed tit, Sylviparus modestus
- Sultan tit, Melanochlora sultanea
- Green-backed tit, Parus monticolus
- Cinereous tit, Parus cinereus
- Japanese tit, Parus minor
- Yellow-cheeked tit, Machlolophus spilonotus

== Penduline-tits ==
Order: Passeriformes Family: Remizidae

The penduline-tits are a group of small passerine birds related to the true tits. They are insectivores.

- Chinese penduline-tit, Remiz consobrinus (A)

== Larks ==
Order: Passeriformes Family: Alaudidae

Larks are small terrestrial birds with often extravagant songs and display flights. Most larks are fairly dull in appearance. Their food is insects and seeds.

- Horsfield's bushlark, Mirafra javanica
- Indochinese bushlark, Mirafra erythrocephala
- Asian short-toed lark, Alaudala cheleensis (A)
- Oriental skylark, Alauda gulgula

== Cisticolas and allies ==
Order: Passeriformes Family: Cisticolidae

The Cisticolidae are warblers found mainly in warmer southern regions of the Old World. They are generally very small birds of drab brown or grey appearance found in open country such as grassland or scrub.

- Common tailorbird, Orthotomus sutorius
- Dark-necked tailorbird, Orthotomus atrogularis
- Ashy tailorbird, Orthotomus ruficeps
- Annam prinia, Prinia rocki (E)
- Brown prinia, Prinia polychroa
- Hill prinia, Prinia superciliaris
- Rufescent prinia, Prinia rufescens
- Gray-breasted prinia, Prinia hodgsonii
- Yellow-bellied prinia, Prinia flaviventris
- Plain prinia, Prinia inornata
- Zitting cisticola, Cisticola juncidis
- Golden-headed cisticola, Cisticola exilis

== Reed warblers and allies ==
Order: Passeriformes Family: Acrocephalidae

The members of this family are usually rather large for "warblers". Most are rather plain olivaceous brown above with much yellow to beige below. They are usually found in open woodland, reedbeds, or tall grass. The family occurs mostly in southern to western Eurasia and surroundings, but it also ranges far into the Pacific, with some species in Africa.

- Thick-billed warbler, Arundinax aedon
- Black-browed reed warbler, Acrocephalus bistrigiceps
- Paddyfield warbler, Acrocephalus agricola (A)
- Blunt-winged warbler, Acrocephalus concinens
- Manchurian reed warbler, Acrocephalus tangorum
- Oriental reed warbler, Acrocephalus orientalis
- Clamorous reed warbler, Acrocephalus stentoreus

== Grassbirds and allies ==
Order: Passeriformes Family: Locustellidae

Locustellidae are a family of small insectivorous songbirds found mainly in Eurasia, Africa, and the Australian region. They are smallish birds with tails that are usually long and pointed, and tend to be drab brownish or buffy all over.

- Striated grassbird, Megalurus palustris
- Pallas's grasshopper warbler, Helopsaltes certhiola
- Pleske's grasshopper warbler, Helopsaltes pleskei
- Lanceolated warbler, Locustella lanceolata
- Brown bush warbler, Locustella luteoventris
- Chinese bush warbler, Locustella tacsanowskia
- Baikal bush warbler, Locustella davidi
- Russet bush warbler, Locustella mendelli
- Dalat bush warbler, Locustella idonea (E)

== Cupwings ==
Order: Passeriformes Family: Pnoepygidae

The members of this small family are found in mountainous parts of South and South East Asia.

- Scaly-breasted cupwing, Pnoepyga albiventer
- Pygmy cupwing, Pnoepyga pusilla

== Swallows ==
Order: Passeriformes Family: Hirundinidae

The family Hirundinidae is adapted to aerial feeding. They have a slender streamlined body, long pointed wings and a short bill with a wide gape. The feet are adapted to perching rather than walking, and the front toes are partially joined at the base.

- Gray-throated martin, Riparia chinensis
- Bank swallow, Riparia riparia
- Dusky crag-martin, Ptyonoprogne concolor
- Barn swallow, Hirundo rustica
- Wire-tailed swallow, Hirundo smithii
- Pacific swallow, Hirundo tahitica
- Red-rumped swallow, Cecropis daurica
- Striated swallow, Cecropis striolata
- Rufous-bellied swallow, Cecropis badia
- Common house-martin, Delichon urbicum
- Asian house-martin, Delichon dasypus
- Nepal house-martin, Delichon nipalense

== Bulbuls ==
Order: Passeriformes Family: Pycnonotidae

Bulbuls are medium-sized songbirds. Some are colourful with yellow, red or orange vents, cheeks, throats or supercilia, but most are drab, with uniform olive-brown to black plumage. Some species have distinct crests.

- Black-headed bulbul, Brachypodius melanocephalos
- Black-crested bulbul, Rubigula flaviventris
- Crested finchbill, Spizixos canifrons
- Collared finchbill, Spizixos semitorques
- Striated bulbul, Pycnonotus striatus
- Red-whiskered bulbul, Pycnonotus jocosus
- Brown-breasted bulbul, Pycnonotus xanthorrhous
- Light-vented bulbul, Pycnonotus sinensis
- Sooty-headed bulbul, Pycnonotus aurigaster
- Stripe-throated bulbul, Pycnonotus finlaysoni
- Flavescent bulbul, Pycnonotus flavescens
- Yellow-vented bulbul, Pycnonotus goiavier
- Streak-eared bulbul, Pycnonotus conradi
- Puff-throated bulbul, Alophoixus pallidus
- Ochraceous bulbul, Alophoixus ochraceus
- Gray-eyed bulbul, Iole propinqua
- Black bulbul, Hypsipetes leucocephalus
- Ashy bulbul, Hemixos flavala
- Chestnut bulbul, Hemixos castanonotus
- Mountain bulbul, Ixos mcclellandii
- Streaked bulbul, Ixos malaccensis

== Leaf warblers ==
Order: Passeriformes Family: Phylloscopidae

Leaf warblers are a family of small insectivorous birds found mostly in Eurasia and ranging into Wallacea and Africa. The species are of various sizes, often green-plumaged above and yellow below, or more subdued with greyish-green to greyish-brown colours.

- Ashy-throated warbler, Phylloscopus maculipennis
- Buff-barred warbler, Phylloscopus pulcher
- Yellow-browed warbler, Phylloscopus inornatus
- Hume's warbler, Phylloscopus humei
- Chinese leaf warbler, Phylloscopus yunnanensis
- Pallas's leaf warbler, Phylloscopus proregulus
- Gansu leaf warbler, Phylloscopus kansuensis (A)
- Sichuan leaf warbler, Phylloscopus forresti
- Radde's warbler, Phylloscopus schwarzi
- Yellow-streaked warbler, Phylloscopus armandii
- Dusky warbler, Phylloscopus fuscatus
- Buff-throated warbler, Phylloscopus subaffinis
- Common chiffchaff, Phylloscopus collybita (A)
- Eastern crowned warbler, Phylloscopus coronatus
- White-spectacled warbler, Phylloscopus affinis
- Gray-cheeked warbler, Phylloscopus poliogenys
- Gray-crowned warbler, Phylloscopus tephrocephalus
- Bianchi's warbler, Phylloscopus valentini
- Martens's warbler, Phylloscopus omeiensis
- Alström's warbler, Phylloscopus soror
- Greenish warbler, Phylloscopus trochiloides
- Two-barred warbler, Phylloscopus plumbeitarsus
- Pale-legged leaf warbler, Phylloscopus tenellipes
- Sakhalin leaf warbler, Phylloscopus borealoides
- Arctic warbler, Phylloscopus borealis
- Chestnut-crowned warbler, Phylloscopus castaniceps
- Limestone leaf warbler, Phylloscopus calciatilis
- Yellow-vented warbler, Phylloscopus cantator
- Sulphur-breasted warbler, Phylloscopus ricketti
- Blyth's leaf warbler, Phylloscopus reguloides
- Claudia's leaf warbler, Phylloscopus claudiae
- Hartert's leaf warbler, Phylloscopus goodsoni
- Davison's leaf warbler, Phylloscopus intensior
- Kloss's leaf warbler, Phylloscopus ogilviegranti

== Bush warblers and allies ==
Order: Passeriformes Family: Scotocercidae

The members of this family are found throughout Africa, Asia, and Polynesia. Their taxonomy is in flux, and some authorities place some genera in other families.

- Pale-footed bush warbler, Urosphena pallidipes
- Asian stubtail, Urosphena squameiceps
- Gray-bellied tesia, Tesia cyaniventer
- Slaty-bellied tesia, Tesia olivea
- Chestnut-crowned bush warbler, Cettia major (A)
- Chestnut-headed tesia, Cettia castaneocoronata
- Yellow-bellied warbler, Abroscopus superciliaris
- Rufous-faced warbler, Abroscopus albogularis
- Black-faced warbler, Abroscopus schisticeps
- Mountain tailorbird, Phyllergates cuculatus
- Broad-billed warbler, Tickellia hodgsoni
- Manchurian bush warbler, Horornis borealis
- Brownish-flanked bush warbler, Horornis fortipes
- Aberrant bush warbler, Horornis flavolivaceus

== Long-tailed tits ==
Order: Passeriformes Family: Aegithalidae

Long-tailed tits are a group of small passerine birds with medium to long tails. They make woven bag nests in trees. Most eat a mixed diet which includes insects.

- Black-throated tit, Aegithalos concinnus

== Sylviid warblers, parrotbills, and allies ==
Order: Passeriformes Family: Sylviidae

The family Sylviidae is a group of small insectivorous passerine birds. They mainly occur as breeding species, as the common name implies, in Europe, Asia and, to a lesser extent, Africa. Most are of generally undistinguished appearance, but many have distinctive songs.

- Golden-breasted fulvetta, Lioparus chrysotis
- Yellow-eyed babbler, Chrysomma sinense
- Spectacled fulvetta, Fulvetta ruficapilla
- Indochinese fulvetta, Fulvetta danisi
- White-browed fulvetta, Fulvetta vinipectus
- Streak-throated fulvetta, Fulvetta manipurensis
- Gray-headed parrotbill, Psittiparus gularis
- Black-headed parrotbill, Psittiparus margaritae (E)
- Rufous-headed parrotbill, Psittiparus bakeri
- Spot-breasted parrotbill, Paradoxornis guttaticollis
- Pale-billed parrotbill, Chleuasicus atrosuperciliaris
- Vinous-throated parrotbill, Sinosuthora webbiana
- Ashy-throated parrotbill, Sinosuthora alphonsiana
- Black-throated parrotbill, Suthora nipalensis
- Golden parrotbill, Suthora verreauxi
- Short-tailed parrotbill, Neosuthora davidiana

== White-eyes, yuhinas, and allies ==
Order: Passeriformes Family: Zosteropidae

The white-eyes are small and mostly undistinguished, their plumage above being generally some dull colour like greenish-olive, but some species have a white or bright yellow throat, breast or lower parts, and several have buff flanks. As their name suggests, many species have a white ring around each eye.

- White-collared yuhina, Parayuhina diademata
- Indochinese yuhina, Staphida torqueola
- Whiskered yuhina, Yuhina flavicollis
- Stripe-throated yuhina, Yuhina gularis
- Black-chinned yuhina, Yuhina nigrimenta
- Chestnut-flanked white-eye, Zosterops erythropleurus
- Indian white-eye, Zosterops palpebrosus
- Swinhoe's white-eye, Zosterops simplex

== Tree-babblers, scimitar-babblers, and allies ==
Order: Passeriformes Family: Timaliidae

The babblers, or timaliids, are somewhat diverse in size and colouration, but are characterised by soft fluffy plumage.

- Chestnut-capped babbler, Timalia pileata
- Pin-striped tit-babbler, Mixornis gularis
- Gray-faced tit-babbler, Mixornis kelleyi
- Golden babbler, Cyanoderma chrysaeum
- Rufous-capped babbler, Cyanoderma ruficeps
- Buff-chested babbler, Cyanoderma ambiguum
- Bar-winged wren-babbler, Spelaeornis troglodytoides (A)
- Pale-throated wren-babbler, Spelaeornis kinneari
- Red-billed scimitar-babbler, Pomatorhinus ochraceiceps
- Coral-billed scimitar-babbler, Pomatorhinus ferruginosus
- Slender-billed scimitar-babbler, Pomatorhinus superciliaris
- Streak-breasted scimitar-babbler, Pomatorhinus ruficollis
- White-browed scimitar-babbler, Pomatorhinus schisticeps
- Large scimitar-babbler, Erythrogenys hypoleucos
- Rusty-cheeked scimitar-babbler, Erythrogenys erythrogenys
- Black-streaked scimitar-babbler, Erythrogenys gravivox
- Gray-throated babbler, Stachyris nigriceps
- Spot-necked babbler, Stachyris striolata
- Sooty babbler, Stachyris herberti
- Nonggang babbler, Stachyris nonggangensis (A)

== Ground babblers and allies ==
Order: Passeriformes Family: Pellorneidae

These small to medium-sized songbirds have soft fluffy plumage but are otherwise rather diverse. Members of the genus Illadopsis are found in forests, but some other genera are birds of scrublands.

- Scaly-crowned babbler, Malacopteron cinereum
- Collared babbler, Gampsorhynchus torquatus
- Yellow-throated fulvetta, Schoeniparus cinereus
- Rufous-winged fulvetta, Schoeniparus castaneceps
- Black-crowned fulvetta, Schoeniparus klossi (E)
- Rufous-throated fulvetta, Schoeniparus rufogularis
- Dusky fulvetta, Schoeniparus brunneus
- Rusty-capped fulvetta, Schoeniparus dubius
- Puff-throated babbler, Pellorneum ruficeps
- Spot-throated babbler, Pellorneum albiventre
- Buff-breasted babbler, Pellorneum tickelli
- Eyebrowed wren-babbler, Napothera epilepidota
- Short-tailed scimitar-babbler, Napothera danjoui
- White-throated wren-babbler, Napothera pasquieri (E)
- Abbott's babbler, Malacocincla abbotti
- Annam limestone babbler, Gypsophila annamensis
- Streaked wren-babbler, Gypsophila brevicaudatus
- Chinese grassbird, Graminicola striatus

== Laughingthrushes and allies ==
Order: Passeriformes Family: Leiothrichidae

The members of this family are diverse in size and colouration, though those of genus Turdoides tend to be brown or greyish. The family is found in Africa, India, and southeast Asia.

- Brown-cheeked fulvetta, Alcippe poioicephala
- David's fulvetta, Alcippe davidi
- Mountain fulvetta, Alcippe peracensis
- Black-browed fulvetta, Alcippe grotei
- Himalayan cutia, Cutia nipalensis
- Vietnamese cutia, Cutia legalleni (E)
- Masked laughingthrush, Garrulax perspicillatus
- White-crested laughingthrush, Garrulax leucolophus
- Lesser necklaced laughingthrush, Garrulax monileger
- Black-hooded laughingthrush, Garrulax milleti (E)
- Gray laughingthrush, Garrulax maesi
- Rufous-cheeked laughingthrush, Garrulax castanotis
- Spot-breasted laughingthrush, Garrulax merulinus
- Orange-breasted laughingthrush, Garrulax annamensis (E)
- Chinese hwamei, Garrulax canorus
- Moustached laughingthrush, Ianthocincla cineracea (A)
- Rufous-chinned laughingthrush, Ianthocincla rufogularis
- Chestnut-eared laughingthrush, Ianthocincla konkakinhensis (E)
- Greater necklaced laughingthrush, Pterorhinus pectoralis
- White-throated laughingthrush, Pterorhinus albogularis
- Black-throated laughingthrush, Pterorhinus chinensis
- White-cheeked laughingthrush, Pterorhinus vassali
- Rufous-vented laughingthrush, Pterorhinus gularis
- White-browed laughingthrush, Pterorhinus sannio
- Scaly laughingthrush, Trochalopteron subunicolor
- Blue-winged laughingthrush, Trochalopteron squamatum
- Black-faced laughingthrush, Trochalopteron affine
- Silver-eared laughingthrush, Trochalopteron melanostigma
- Golden-winged laughingthrush, Trochalopteron ngoclinhense (E)
- Collared laughingthrush, Trochalopteron yersini (E)
- Red-winged laughingthrush, Trochalopteron formosum
- Red-tailed laughingthrush, Trochalopteron milnei
- Black-headed sibia, Heterophasia desgodinsi
- Long-tailed sibia, Heterophasia picaoides
- Silver-eared mesia, Leiothrix argentauris
- Red-billed leiothrix, Leiothrix lutea
- Red-tailed minla, Minla ignotincta
- Rufous-backed sibia, Leioptila annectens
- Gray-crowned crocias, Laniellus langbianis (E)
- Scarlet-faced liocichla, Liocichla ripponi
- Black-crowned barwing, Actinodura sodangorum (E)
- Streaked barwing, Actinodura souliei
- Spectacled barwing, Actinodura ramsayi
- Blue-winged minla, Actinodura cyanouroptera
- Chestnut-tailed minla, Actinodura strigula

== Wallcreeper ==
Order: Passeriformes Family: Tichodromidae

The wallcreeper is the only member of its family. It inhabits the high mountains of Eurasia from southern Europe to central China.

- Wallcreeper, Tichodroma muraria (A)

== Nuthatches ==
Order: Passeriformes Family: Sittidae

Nuthatches are small woodland birds. They have the unusual ability to climb down trees head first, unlike other birds which can only go upwards. Nuthatches have big heads, short tails and powerful bills and feet.

- Chestnut-bellied nuthatch, Sitta castanea
- Burmese nuthatch, Sitta neglecta
- Chestnut-vented nuthatch, Sitta nagaensis
- White-tailed nuthatch, Sitta himalayensis
- Velvet-fronted nuthatch, Sitta frontalis
- Yellow-billed nuthatch, Sitta solangiae
- Beautiful nuthatch, Sitta formosa

== Treecreepers ==
Order: Passeriformes Family: Certhiidae

Treecreepers are small woodland birds, brown above and white below. They have thin pointed down-curved bills, which they use to extricate insects from bark. They have stiff tail feathers, like woodpeckers, which they use to support themselves on vertical trees.

- Hume's treecreeper, Certhia manipurensis

== Spotted elachura ==
Order: Passeriformes Family: Elachuridae

This species, the only one in its family, inhabits forest undergrowth throughout South East Asia.

- Spotted elachura, Elachura formosa

== Dippers ==
Order: Passeriformes Family: Cinclidae

Dippers are a group of perching birds whose habitat includes aquatic environments in the Americas, Europe and Asia. They are named for their bobbing or dipping movements.

- Brown dipper, Cinclus pallasii

== Starlings ==
Order: Passeriformes Family: Sturnidae

Starlings are small to medium-sized passerine birds. Their flight is strong and direct and they are very gregarious. Their preferred habitat is fairly open country. They eat insects and fruit. Plumage is typically dark with a metallic sheen.

- Asian glossy starling, Aplonis panayensis (A)
- Golden-crested myna, Ampeliceps coronatus
- Common hill myna, Gracula religiosa
- European starling, Sturnus vulgaris (A)
- Rosy starling, Pastor roseus (A)
- Daurian starling, Agropsar sturninus
- Chestnut-cheeked starling, Agropsar philippensis (A)
- Black-collared starling, Gracupica nigricollis
- Siamese pied starling, Gracupica floweri (A)
- White-shouldered starling, Sturnia sinensis
- Chestnut-tailed starling, Sturnia malabarica
- Red-billed starling, Spodiopsar sericeus
- White-cheeked starling, Spodiopsar cineraceus
- Common myna, Acridotheres tristis
- Vinous-breasted myna, Acridotheres leucocephalus
- Great myna, Acridotheres grandis
- Crested myna, Acridotheres cristatellus

== Thrushes and allies ==
Order: Passeriformes Family: Turdidae

The thrushes are a group of passerine birds that occur mainly in the Old World. They are plump, soft plumaged, small to medium-sized insectivores or sometimes omnivores, often feeding on the ground. Many have attractive songs.

- Long-tailed thrush, Zoothera dixoni
- Alpine thrush, Zoothera mollissima
- Himalayan thrush, Zoothera salimalii
- Sichuan thrush, Zoothera griseiceps
- Dark-sided thrush, Zoothera marginata
- Long-billed thrush, Zoothera monticola
- White's thrush, Zoothera aurea
- Scaly thrush, Zoothera dauma
- Purple cochoa, Cochoa purpurea
- Green cochoa, Cochoa viridis
- Siberian thrush, Geokichla sibirica
- Orange-headed thrush, Geokichla citrina
- Chinese thrush, Otocichla mupinensis (A)
- Chinese blackbird, Turdus mandarinus
- Gray-winged blackbird, Turdus boulboul
- Japanese thrush, Turdus cardis
- Gray-backed thrush, Turdus hortulorum
- Black-breasted thrush, Turdus dissimilis
- Eyebrowed thrush, Turdus obscurus
- Pale thrush, Turdus pallidus (A)
- Chestnut thrush, Turdus rubrocanus
- Red-throated thrush, Turdus ruficollis (A)
- Dusky thrush, Turdus eunomus

== Old World flycatchers ==
Order: Passeriformes Family: Muscicapidae

Old World flycatchers are a large group of small passerine birds native to the Old World. They are mainly small arboreal insectivores. The appearance of these birds is highly varied, but they mostly have weak songs and harsh calls.

- Gray-streaked flycatcher, Muscicapa griseisticta
- Dark-sided flycatcher, Muscicapa sibirica
- Ferruginous flycatcher, Muscicapa ferruginea
- Asian brown flycatcher, Muscicapa dauurica
- Brown-breasted flycatcher, Muscicapa muttui
- Brown-streaked flycatcher, Muscicapa williamsoni
- Oriental magpie-robin, Copsychus saularis
- White-rumped shama, Copsychus malabaricus
- White-gorgeted flycatcher, Anthipes monileger
- Rufous-browed flycatcher, Anthipes solitaris
- White-tailed flycatcher, Cyornis concretus
- Hainan blue flycatcher, Cyornis hainanus
- Pale blue flycatcher, Cyornis unicolor
- Chinese blue flycatcher, Cyornis glaucicomans
- Hill blue flycatcher, Cyornis whitei
- Indochinese blue flycatcher, Cyornis sumatrensis
- Brown-chested jungle-flycatcher, Cyornis brunneatus
- Large niltava, Niltava grandis
- Small niltava, Niltava macgrigoriae
- Fujian niltava, Niltava davidi
- Rufous-bellied niltava, Niltava sundara
- Vivid niltava, Niltava vivida
- Blue-and-white flycatcher, Cyanoptila cyanomelana
- Zappey's flycatcher, Cyanoptila cumatilis (A)
- Verditer flycatcher, Eumyias thalassina
- Gould's shortwing, Brachypteryx stellata
- Lesser shortwing, Brachypteryx leucophrys
- Himalayan shortwing, Brachypteryx cruralis
- Chinese shortwing, Brachypteryx sinensis
- Rufous-tailed robin, Larvivora sibilans
- Japanese robin, Larvivora akahige (A)
- Siberian blue robin, Larvivora cyane
- White-bellied redstart, Luscinia phaenicuroides (A)
- Bluethroat, Luscinia svecica
- Blue whistling-thrush, Myophonus caeruleus
- Little forktail, Enicurus scouleri
- White-crowned forktail, Enicurus leschenaulti
- Spotted forktail, Enicurus maculatus
- Slaty-backed forktail, Enicurus schistaceus
- Blackthroat, Calliope obscura
- Siberian rubythroat, Calliope calliope
- White-tailed robin, Myiomela leucura
- Blue-fronted robin, Cinclidium frontale
- Red-flanked bluetail, Tarsiger cyanurus
- Himalayan bluetail, Tarsiger rufilatus
- White-browed bush-robin, Tarsiger indicus
- Golden bush-robin, Tarsiger chrysaeus
- Yellow-rumped flycatcher, Ficedula zanthopygia
- Green-backed flycatcher, Ficedula elisae
- Narcissus flycatcher, Ficedula narcissina
- Mugimaki flycatcher, Ficedula mugimaki
- Slaty-backed flycatcher, Ficedula erithacus (A)
- Slaty-blue flycatcher, Ficedula tricolor
- Snowy-browed flycatcher, Ficedula hyperythra
- Pygmy flycatcher, Ficedula hodgsoni
- Rufous-gorgeted flycatcher, Ficedula strophiata
- Sapphire flycatcher, Ficedula sapphira
- Little pied flycatcher, Ficedula westermanni
- Taiga flycatcher, Ficedula albicilla
- Red-breasted flycatcher, Ficedula parva
- Blue-fronted redstart, Phoenicurus frontalis
- Plumbeous redstart, Phoenicurus fuliginosus
- White-capped redstart, Phoenicurus leucocephalus
- Black redstart, Phoenicurus ochruros (A)
- Daurian redstart, Phoenicurus auroreus
- Chestnut-bellied rock-thrush, Monticola rufiventris
- White-throated rock-thrush, Monticola gularis
- Blue rock-thrush, Monticola solitarius
- Siberian stonechat, Saxicola maurus (A)
- Amur stonechat, Saxicola stejnegeri
- Pied bushchat, Saxicola caprata
- Jerdon's bushchat, Saxicola jerdoni
- Gray bushchat, Saxicola ferreus

== Flowerpeckers ==
Order: Passeriformes Family: Dicaeidae

The flowerpeckers are very small, stout, often brightly coloured birds, with short tails, short thick curved bills and tubular tongues.

- Scarlet-breasted flowerpecker, Prionochilus thoracicus
- Thick-billed flowerpecker, Dicaeum agile
- Yellow-vented flowerpecker, Dicaeum chrysorrheum
- Yellow-bellied flowerpecker, Dicaeum melanozanthum
- Orange-bellied flowerpecker, Dicaeum trigonostigma (A)
- Plain flowerpecker, Dicaeum minullum
- Fire-breasted flowerpecker, Dicaeum ignipectus
- Scarlet-backed flowerpecker, Dicaeum cruentatum

== Sunbirds and spiderhunters ==
Order: Passeriformes Family: Nectariniidae

The sunbirds and spiderhunters are very small passerine birds which feed largely on nectar, although they will also take insects, especially when feeding young. Flight is fast and direct on their short wings. Most species can take nectar by hovering like a hummingbird, but usually perch to feed.

- Ruby-cheeked sunbird, Chalcoparia singalensis
- Brown-throated sunbird, Anthreptes malacensis
- Van Hasselt's sunbird, Leptocoma brasiliana
- Copper-throated sunbird, Leptocoma calcostetha
- Purple sunbird, Cinnyris asiaticus
- Olive-backed sunbird, Cinnyris jugularis
- Black-throated sunbird, Aethopyga saturata
- Mrs. Gould's sunbird, Aethopyga gouldiae
- Green-tailed sunbird, Aethopyga nipalensis
- Crimson sunbird, Aethopyga siparaja
- Fork-tailed sunbird, Aethopyga christinae
- Purple-naped sunbird, Kurochkinegramma hypogrammicum
- Little spiderhunter, Arachnothera longirostra
- Streaked spiderhunter, Arachnothera magna
- Gray-breasted spiderhunter, Arachnothera modesta

== Fairy-bluebirds ==
Order: Passeriformes Family: Irenidae

The fairy-bluebirds are bulbul-like birds of open forest or thorn scrub. The males are dark-blue and the females a duller green.

- Asian fairy-bluebird, Irena puella

== Leafbirds ==
Order: Passeriformes Family: Chloropseidae

The leafbirds are small, bulbul-like birds. The males are brightly plumaged, usually in greens and yellows.

- Blue-winged leafbird, Chloropsis cochinchinensis
- Golden-fronted leafbird, Chloropsis aurifrons
- Orange-bellied leafbird, Chloropsis hardwickii

== Weavers and allies ==
Order: Passeriformes Family: Ploceidae

The weavers are small passerine birds related to the finches. They are seed-eating birds with rounded conical bills. The males of many species are brightly coloured, usually in red or yellow and black, some species show variation in colour only in the breeding season.

- Streaked weaver, Ploceus manyar
- Baya weaver, Ploceus philippinus
- Asian golden weaver, Ploceus hypoxanthus

== Waxbills and allies ==
Order: Passeriformes Family: Estrildidae

The estrildid finches are small passerine birds of the Old World tropics and Australasia. They are gregarious and often colonial seed eaters with short thick but pointed bills. They are all similar in structure and habits, but have wide variation in plumage colours and patterns.

- Red avadavat, Amandava amandava
- Pin-tailed parrotfinch, Erythrura prasina
- White-rumped munia, Lonchura striata
- Scaly-breasted munia, Lonchura punctulata
- White-bellied munia, Lonchura leucogastra
- Chestnut munia, Lonchura atricapilla
- White-headed munia, Lonchura maja
- Java sparrow, Padda oryzivora (I)

== Old World sparrows ==
Order: Passeriformes Family: Passeridae

Old World sparrows are small passerine birds. In general, sparrows tend to be small, plump, brown or grey birds with short tails and short powerful beaks. Sparrows are seed eaters, but they also consume small insects.

- House sparrow, Passer domesticus (I)
- Russet sparrow, Passer cinnamomeus
- Plain-backed sparrow, Passer flaveolus
- Eurasian tree sparrow, Passer montanus

== Wagtails and pipits ==
Order: Passeriformes Family: Motacillidae

Motacillidae is a family of small passerine birds with medium to long tails. They include the wagtails, longclaws and pipits. They are slender, ground feeding insectivores of open country.

- Forest wagtail, Dendronanthus indicus
- Gray wagtail, Motacilla cinerea
- Western yellow wagtail, Motacilla flava
- Eastern yellow wagtail, Motacilla tschutschensis
- Citrine wagtail, Motacilla citreola
- Mekong wagtail, Motacilla samveasnae
- White wagtail, Motacilla alba
- Richard's pipit, Anthus richardi
- Paddyfield pipit, Anthus rufulus
- Upland pipit, Anthus sylvanus (A)
- Rosy pipit, Anthus roseatus
- Olive-backed pipit, Anthus hodgsoni
- Red-throated pipit, Anthus cervinus
- Water pipit, Anthus spinoletta
- American pipit, Anthus rubescens (A)

== Finches, euphonias, and allies ==
Order: Passeriformes Family: Fringillidae

Finches are seed-eating passerine birds, that are small to moderately large and have a strong beak, usually conical and in some species very large. All have twelve tail feathers and nine primaries. These birds have a bouncing flight with alternating bouts of flapping and gliding on closed wings, and most sing well.

- Brambling, Fringilla montifringilla (A)
- Spot-winged grosbeak, Mycerobas melanozanthos
- Yellow-billed grosbeak, Eophona migratoria (A)
- Japanese grosbeak, Eophona personata (A)
- Common rosefinch, Carpodacus erythrinus
- Scarlet finch, Carpodacus sipahi
- Vinaceous rosefinch, Carpodacus vinaceus (A)
- Brown bullfinch, Pyrrhula nipalensis
- Gray-headed bullfinch, Pyrrhula erythaca (A)
- Dark-breasted rosefinch, Procarduelis nipalensis
- Oriental greenfinch, Chloris sinica
- Vietnamese greenfinch, Chloris monguilloti (E)
- Black-headed greenfinch, Chloris ambigua
- Red crossbill, Loxia curvirostra
- Eurasian siskin, Spinus spinus (A)

== Old World buntings ==
Order: Passeriformes Family: Emberizidae

The emberizids are a large family of passerine birds. They are seed-eating birds with distinctively shaped bills. Many emberizid species have distinctive head patterns.

- Crested bunting, Emberiza lathami
- Black-headed bunting, Emberiza melanocephala (A)
- Red-headed bunting, Emberiza bruniceps (A)
- Chestnut-eared bunting, Emberiza fucata
- Godlewski's bunting, Emberiza godlewskii (A)
- Gray-necked bunting, Emberiza buchanani (A)
- Yellow-throated bunting, Emberiza elegans (A)
- Pallas's bunting, Emberiza pallasi (A)
- Reed bunting, Emberiza schoeniclus (A)
- Yellow-breasted bunting, Emberiza aureola
- Little bunting, Emberiza pusilla
- Rustic bunting, Emberiza rustica (A)
- Black-faced bunting, Emberiza spodocephala
- Chestnut bunting, Emberiza rutila
- Tristram's bunting, Emberiza tristrami

== See also ==
- List of birds
- Lists of birds by region
