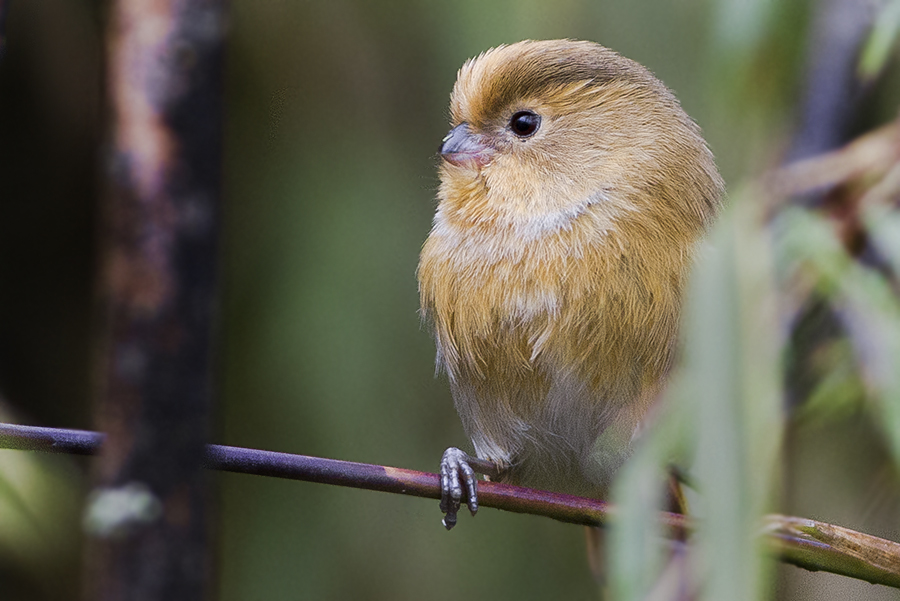
- Paradoxornis fulvifrons fulvifrons from Pangolakha WLS, Sikkim, India

Conservation status
- Least Concern (IUCN 3.1)

Scientific classification
- Kingdom: Animalia
- Phylum: Chordata
- Class: Aves
- Order: Passeriformes
- Family: Paradoxornithidae
- Genus: Suthora
- Species: S. fulvifrons

Binomial name
- Suthora fulvifrons (Hodgson, 1845)
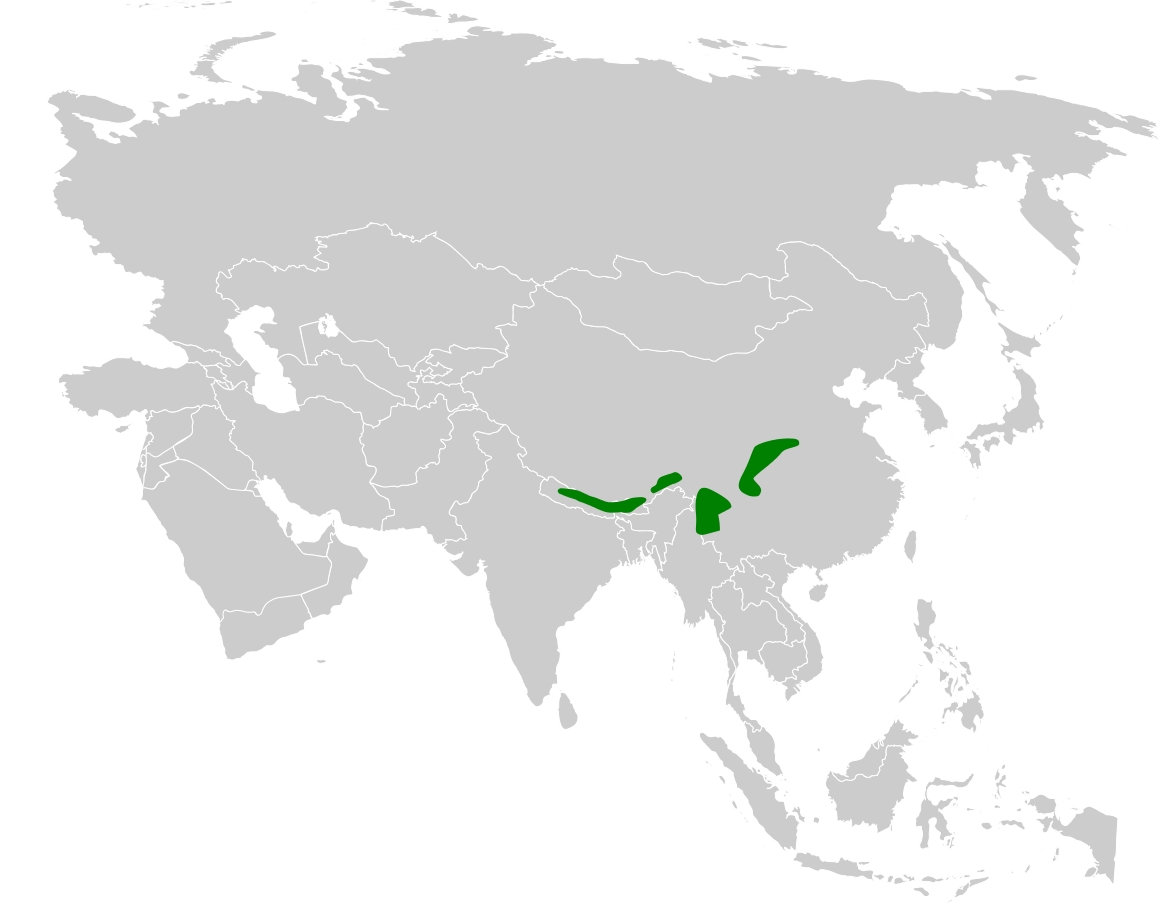
- Global distribution

Synonyms
- Paradoxornis fulvifrons

= Fulvous parrotbill =

Species of bird

The fulvous parrotbill (Suthora fulvifrons) is a species of bird in the family Paradoxornithidae. The species is also known as the fulvous-fronted parrotbill, the fulvous-fronted suthora, and the fulvous-fronted crowtit. The species, along with several others from the genus Suthora, is sometimes placed in the genus Paradoxornis. The species has four subspecies; the nominate subspecies from central Nepal, Bhutan and north-east India; P. f. chayulensis from north India and south China; P. f. albifacies from north Burma and nearby south China, and P. f. cyanophrys from central China.

== Distribution and habitat ==
The fulvous parrotbill is a bamboo specialist, exclusively living on dense stands of bamboo in or near forests. It lives in montane stands, ranging from 2,440–3,660 m (8,010–12,010 ft), most commonly above 2,700 m (8,900 ft) but sometimes down to 1,700 m (5,600 ft). The species is not thought to be migratory.

== Description ==
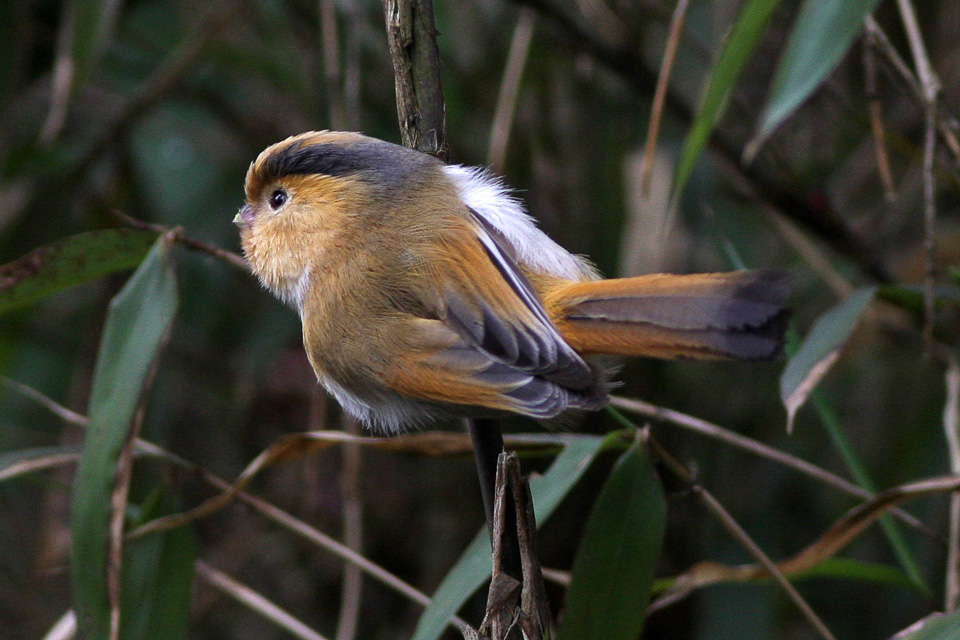
Paradoxornis fulvifrons cyanophrys

The species is small, 12 to 12.5 cm (4.7–4.9 in) in length. The plumage of the nominate is dominated by a rich buff head, upper wing coverts, flanks, rump and tail. The belly is white and the face is dominated by a black stripe above the eye that gets larger towards the middle and then smaller again, and a faint white stripe below the face. The sexes are alike; the juvenile resembles the adult but is darker, particularly below. P. f. chayulensis has a paler belly than the nominate, P. f. albifacies has a darker stripe above the eye, and P. f. cyanophrys has a blue-grey eyestripe and brighter plumage overall.

== Behaviour ==
The fulvous parrotbill feeds on the buds of bamboo and birches, as well as tiny seeds and insects. In order to aid the digestion of their food they will swallow grit to act as a gizzard stone. When not breeding they will form flocks of up to 20 or 30 birds.

The nests of the fulvous parrotbill are bowl-shaped and built by both parents from bamboo leaves, rootlets and mosses. They are placed in dense stands of bamboo, between 0.7–1.9 m (2.3–6.2 ft) off the ground. The average clutch size is around 3.3 eggs, which are pale blue. Both parents incubate the eggs and care for the nestlings. Nesting success is low, possibly because of human disturbance.
