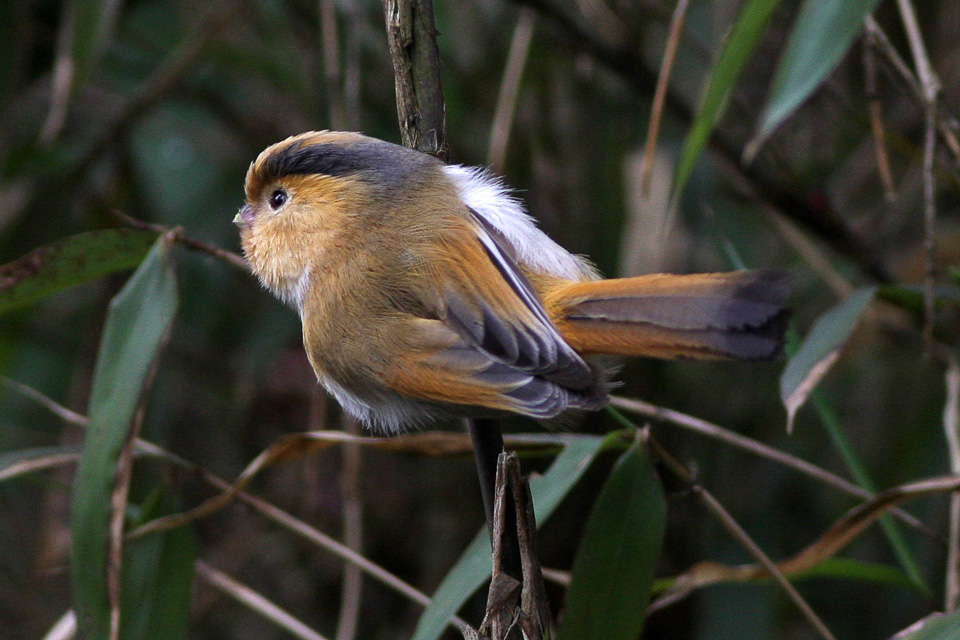
- Fulvous parrotbill (Suthora fulvifrons)

Scientific classification
- Kingdom: Animalia
- Phylum: Chordata
- Class: Aves
- Order: Passeriformes
- Family: Paradoxornithidae
- Genus: Suthora; Hodgson, 1837

Type species
- Suthora nipalensis Hodgson, 1837

= Suthora =

Genus of birds

Suthora is a genus of birds in the family Paradoxornithidae.

== Taxonomy ==
The genus Suthora was introduced in 1837 by the English naturalist Brian Houghton Hodgson with the type species as Suthora nipalensis, the black-throated parrotbill. The genus name is the Nepalese word for the black-throated parrotbill (Suthora nipalensis). The genus now includes species formerly placed in the genera Neosuthora, Chleuasicus, and Sinosuthora. These genera are now considered as junior synonyms of Suthora based on the results of a molecular phylogenetic study by Tianlong Cai and collaborators published in 2019.

== Species ==
The genus contains the following 12 species:

Image	Common name	Scientific name	Distribution
	Short-tailed parrotbill	Suthora davidiana	China, Laos, Myanmar, Thailand, and Vietnam
	Fulvous parrotbill	Suthora fulvifrons	Nepal, Bhutan, China
	Black-throated parrotbill	Suthora nipalensis	Bhutan, India, Laos, Myanmar, Nepal, Thailand, Tibet and Vietnam
	Golden parrotbill	Suthora verreauxi	China, Laos, Myanmar, Taiwan, and Vietnam
	Pale-billed parrotbill	Suthora atrosuperciliaris	Bangladesh, Bhutan, China, India, Laos, Myanmar, and Thailand
	Spectacled parrotbill	Suthora conspicillata	central China
	Grey-hooded parrotbill	Suthora zappeyi	central China
	Brown-winged parrotbill	Suthora brunnea	Myanmar to south central and southwest China
	Eye-ringed parrotbill	Suthora ricketti	south Sichuan and north Yunnan (China).
	Vinous-throated parrotbill	Suthora webbiana	China, Japan, Korea, Mongolia, Russia, Taiwan, and Vietnam
	Ashy-throated parrotbill	Suthora alphonsiana	China, Vietnam
	Przevalski's parrotbill	Suthora przewalskii	central China
