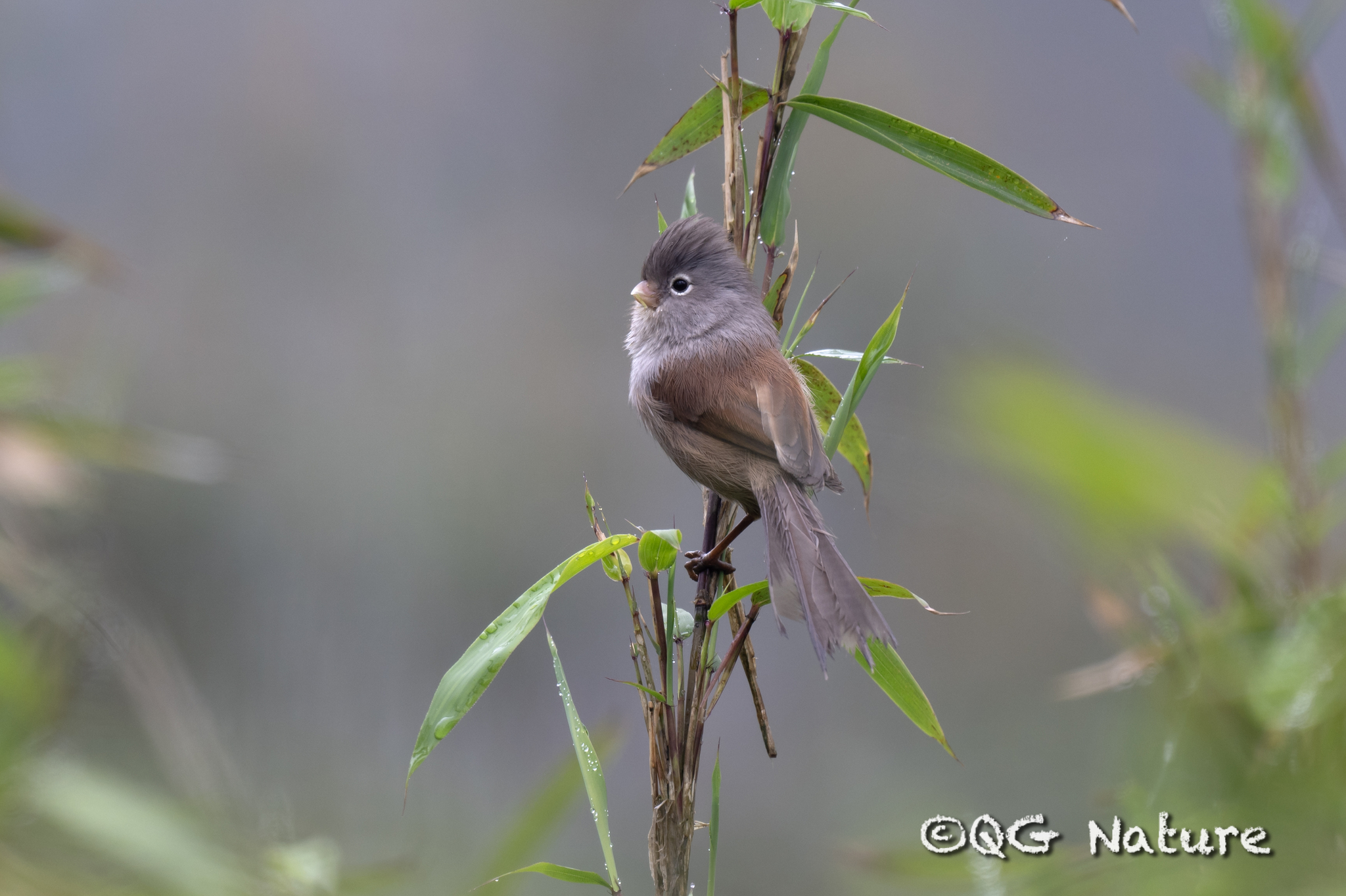

Conservation status
- Vulnerable (IUCN 3.1)

Scientific classification
- Kingdom: Animalia
- Phylum: Chordata
- Class: Aves
- Order: Passeriformes
- Family: Paradoxornithidae
- Genus: Suthora
- Species: S. zappeyi

Binomial name
- Suthora zappeyi Thayer & Bangs, 1912

Synonyms
- Paradoxornis zappeyi Sinosuthora zappeyi

= Grey-hooded parrotbill =

Species of bird

The grey-hooded parrotbill (Suthora zappeyi) is a species of bird in the family Paradoxornithidae. It is endemic to China. Its natural habitats are temperate forests and temperate shrubland. It is threatened by habitat loss.
