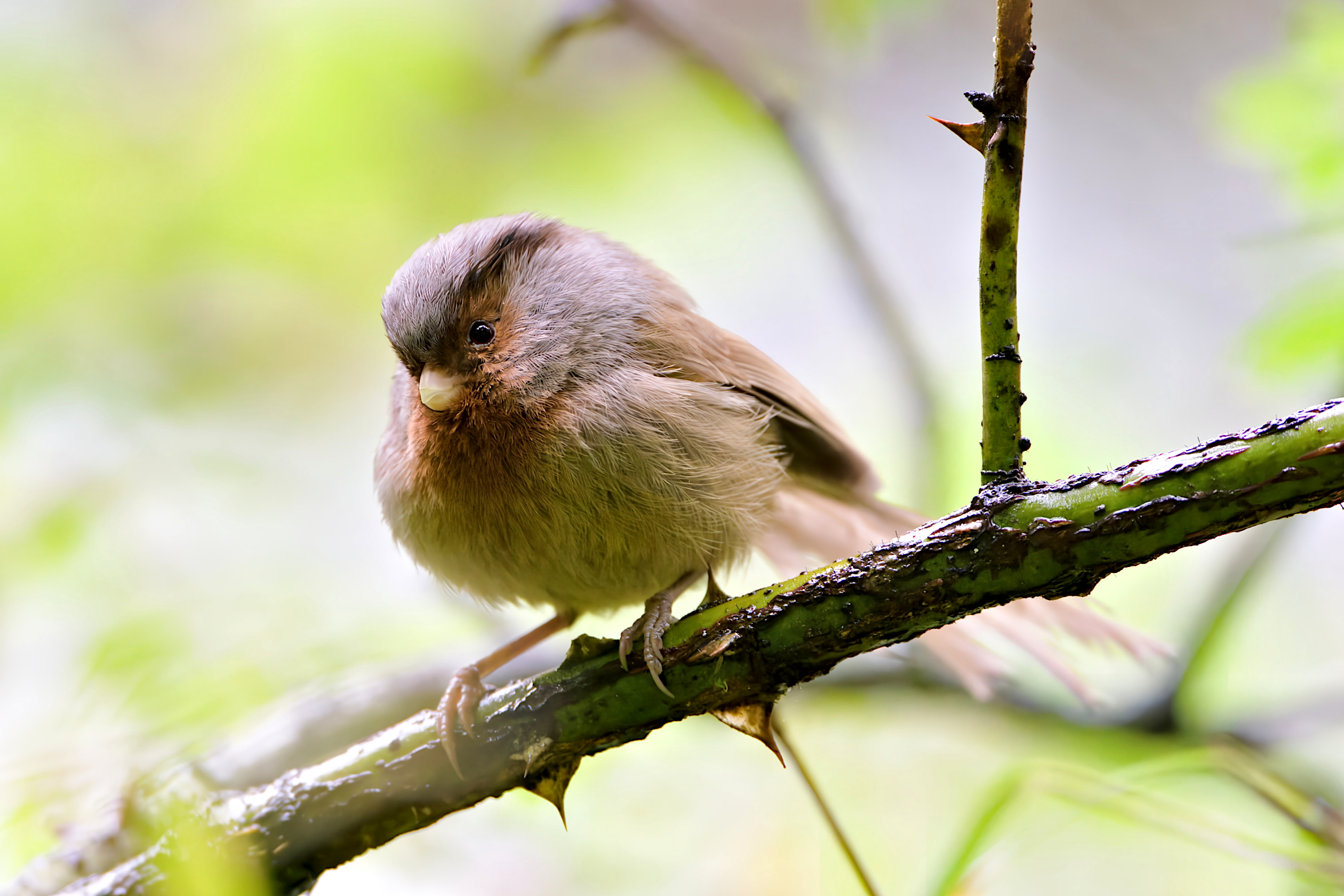
- in Pingwu County, Sichuan Province, China.

Conservation status
- Least Concern (IUCN 3.1)

Scientific classification
- Kingdom: Animalia
- Phylum: Chordata
- Class: Aves
- Order: Passeriformes
- Family: Paradoxornithidae
- Genus: Suthora
- Species: S. przewalskii

Binomial name
- Suthora przewalskii Berezowski & Bianchi, 1891

Synonyms
- Paradoxornis przewalskii Sinosuthora przewalskii

= Przevalski's parrotbill =

Species of bird

Przevalski's parrotbill (Suthora przewalskii) or the rusty-throated parrotbill, is a species of bird in the family Paradoxornithidae. It is endemic to a small area of central China. Its natural habitat is temperate forests. It is threatened by habitat loss.

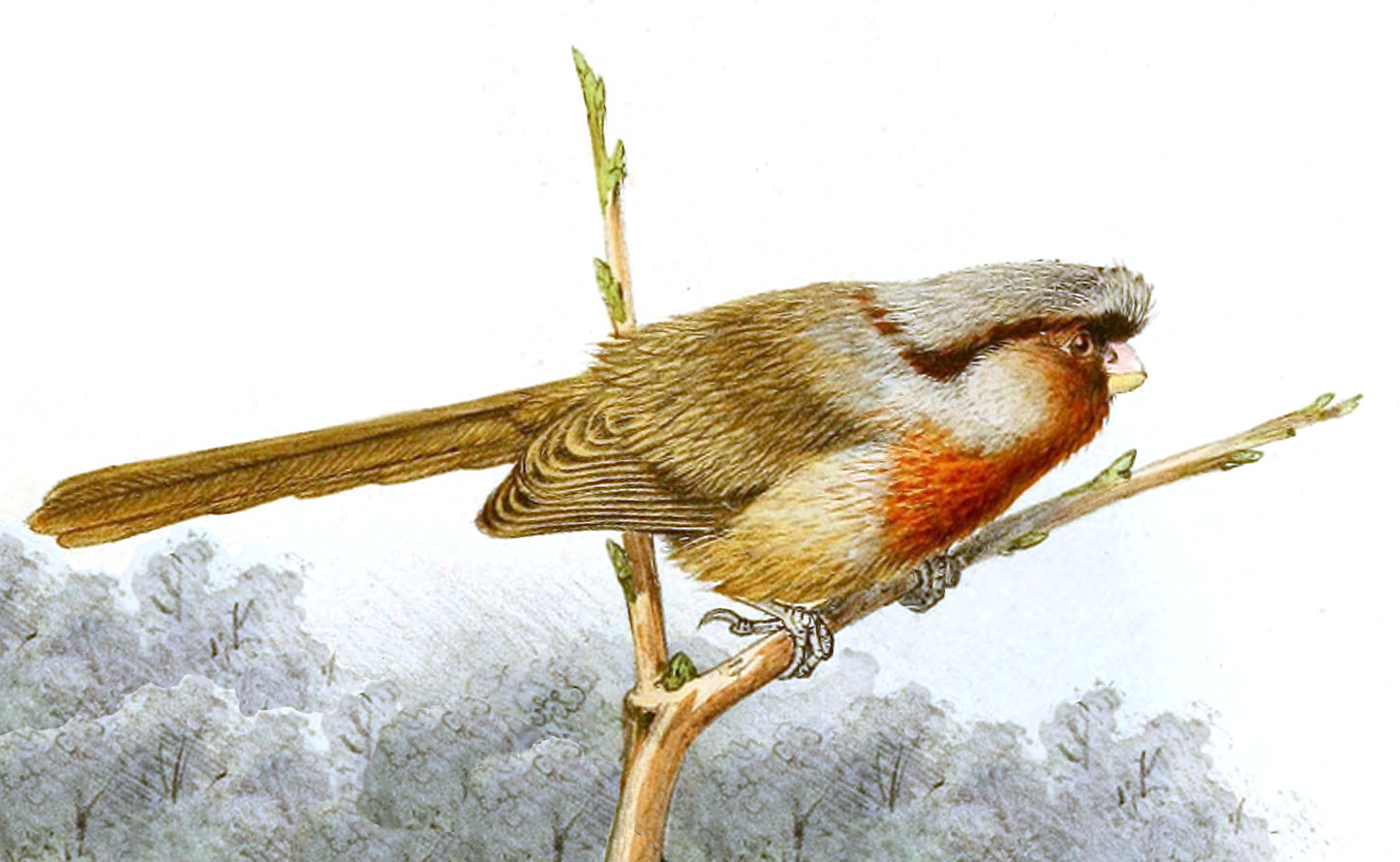
Illustration of the Przevalski's parrotbill
