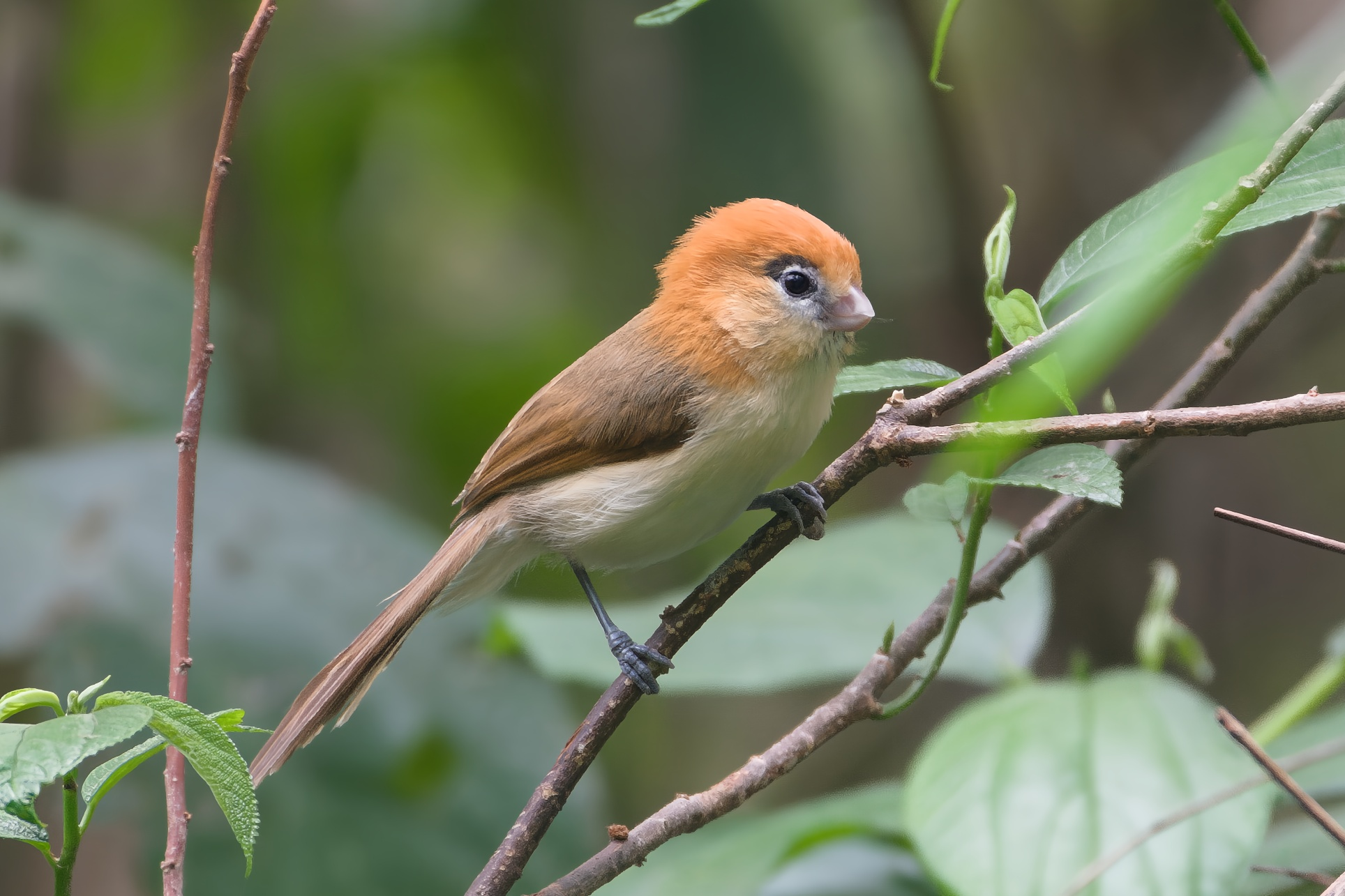
- in Yingjiang County, Yunnan Province, China.

Conservation status
- Least Concern (IUCN 3.1)

Scientific classification
- Kingdom: Animalia
- Phylum: Chordata
- Class: Aves
- Order: Passeriformes
- Family: Paradoxornithidae
- Genus: Suthora
- Species: S. atrosuperciliaris

Binomial name
- Suthora atrosuperciliaris (Godwin-Austen, 1877)

Synonyms
- Paradoxornis atrosuperciliaris Chleuasicus atrosuperciliaris

= Pale-billed parrotbill =

Species of bird

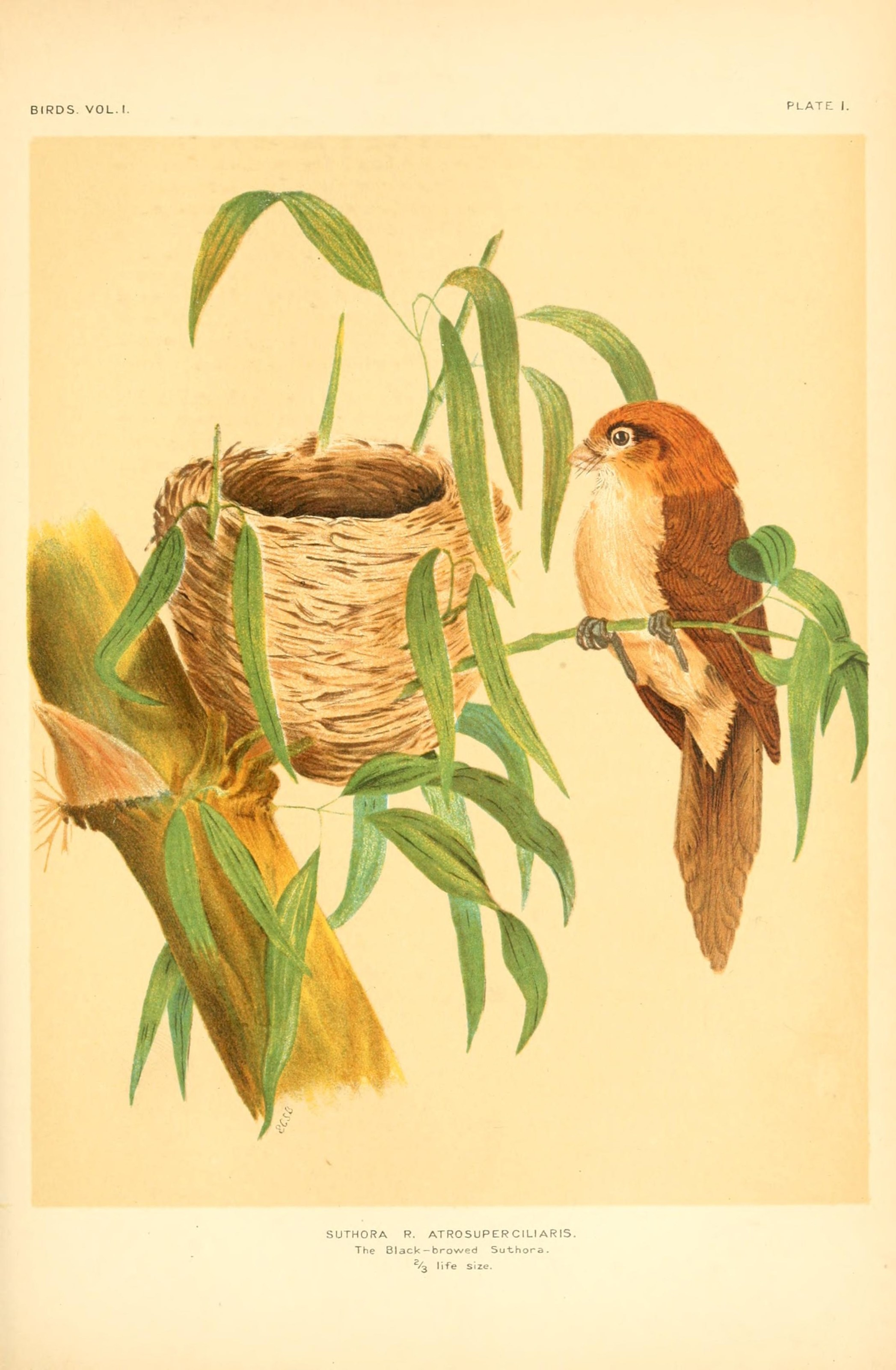
Illustration of the pale-billed parrotbill

The pale-billed parrotbill (Suthora atrosuperciliaris) is a small and round bird with a short tail that was first found in China, where it still resides in evergreen forests or in habitats with bamboo.

== Field Identification ==
The pale-billed parrotbill tends to be about 14-15 centimeters in height, and are recognized due to their fatter appearance, short tail, and color scheme. They are well known for their orange hair spiking up near their crown as well as a blueish ring surrounding the eye. Their irises are typically either bright brown or a bright red-brown. Their bodies tend to feature a pale buff, with a blackish-brown upper wing, and a rufous-buff inner fringe to their flight feathers. Their pinkish bill and dark brown tale are also key features of the pale billed parrotbill. The pale-billed parrotbill exhibits little to no sexual dimorphism and can look no existent to the untrained eye. The juvenile parrotbill's colors are duller and they have softer feathers making them appear rounder.

== Habitat ==
The pale-billed parrotbill is found near bamboo or evergreen forests with tall grass in altitudes ranging anywhere from 215 to 2100 meters. They are often spotted in Bangladesh, Bhutan, China, India, Laos, Myanmar, and Thailand in subtropical or tropical moist lowland regions. During certain times of the year, they will descend it altitude to escape cold temperatures.

== Conservation Status ==
The pale-billed parrotbill is recognized with the conservation status of "least concern", meaning they are not globally threatened. Despite not being categorized as a globally threatened species, deforestation may lead to loss of habitat, potentially leading the species to be recognized by the global community as a threatened species.

== Call ==
Pale-billed parrotbills have a simple, repetitive call. They sing with sharp chirping noises rapidly at varying speeds. When in flocks these birds create a symphony of sounds which can serve as a mechanism for communicating as a big group making it easier for individuals to stay connected in a dense forest.

== Diet ==
The pale-billed parrotbill is an omnivore that feeds on small seeds, fruits, nectar, beetles, grasshoppers, and spiders. They are found in groups of 6-12 birds and often found hanging upside down while foraging. The ability to forage in groups gives them a great advantage in their ability to efficiently find food resources.

== Breeding ==
The breeding season in India lasts from April-July. The pale billed parrotbill's nests are made from grass, bark, bamboo, lined with grass stems and scraps of tree bark. They lay their eggs within 2m of the ground among clusters of twigs growing from bamboo nodes or attached to reeds.
