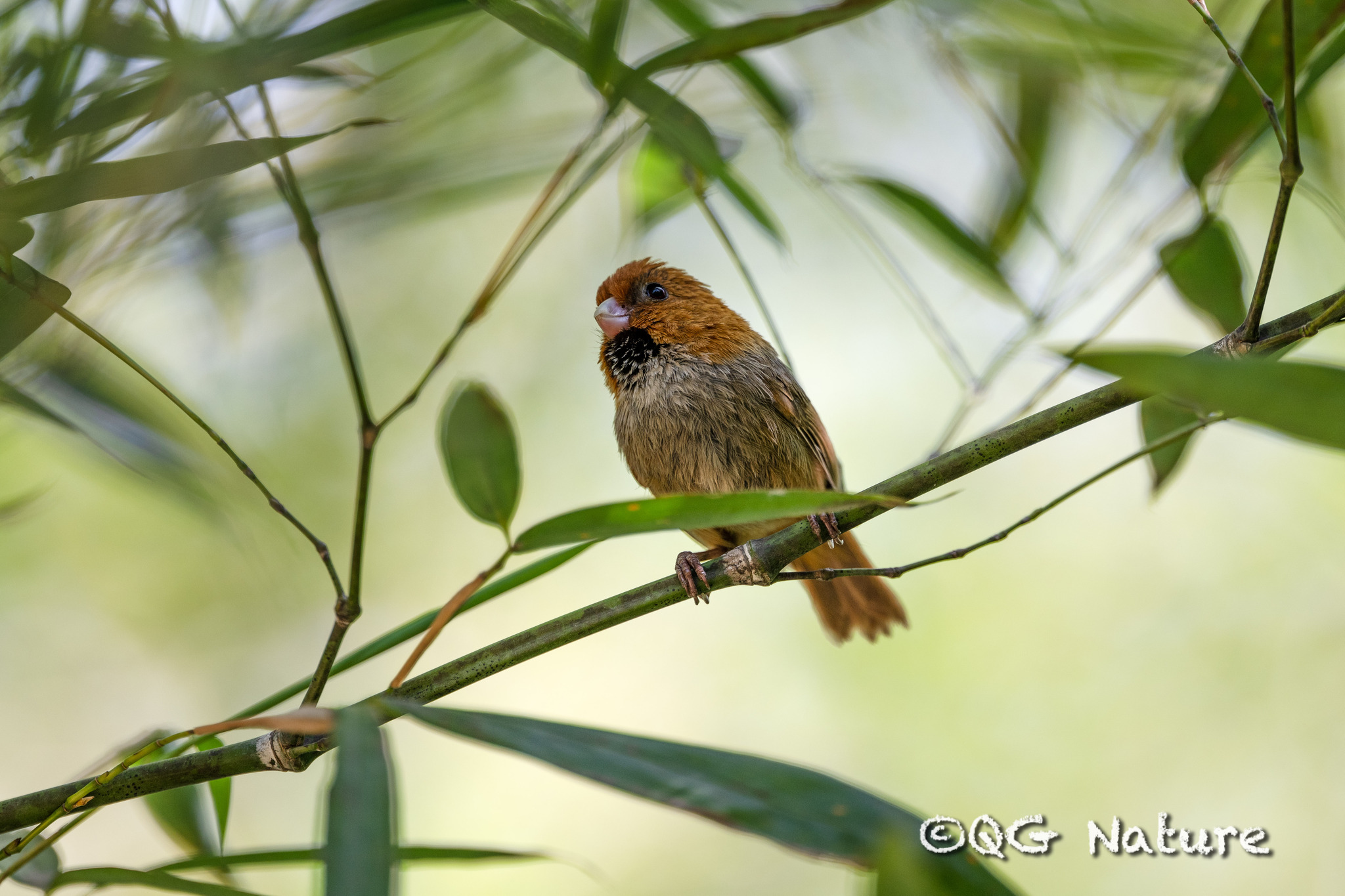

Conservation status
- Least Concern (IUCN 3.1)

Scientific classification
- Kingdom: Animalia
- Phylum: Chordata
- Class: Aves
- Order: Passeriformes
- Family: Paradoxornithidae
- Genus: Suthora
- Species: S. davidiana

Binomial name
- Suthora davidiana H. H. Slater, 1897

Synonyms
- Paradoxornis davidianus H. H. Slater, 1897 Neosuthora davidiana

= Short-tailed parrotbill =

Species of bird

The short-tailed parrotbill (Suthora davidiana) is a species of bird in the family Paradoxornithidae. It is found in China, Laos, Myanmar, Thailand, and Vietnam. Its natural habitat is subtropical or tropical moist lowland forests.

This genus differs from Suthora in having the tail less graduated and much shorter, not more than three-fourths the length of the wing; the bill is larger and much deeper in proportion; the wing is still more rounded, the 4th to the 7th being subequal. It contains but one species, and 3 subspecies, S. d. thompsoni ("Thompson's suthora"), and is found within India, S.d. tonkinensis found in Northeastern Laos, and S.d.davidiana found in eastern China around northern Guangdong and Zhejiang.

Top and sides of the head bright cinnamon-rufous; hind neck, back and rump pale slate-grey, more or less washed with olive; wings and tail grey-brown, the quills edged with bright rufescent brown; chin and throat black; breast grey tinged with buff, more especially on the centre; flanks, abdomen and lower tail-coverts clear brownish ochraceous. Bill fleshy horny; irides hazel; legs plumbeous grey. Total length about 95 to 100 mm.; wing 50 to 52 mm.; tail 36 to 38 mm.

This subspecies is found in the Southern Shan States.
