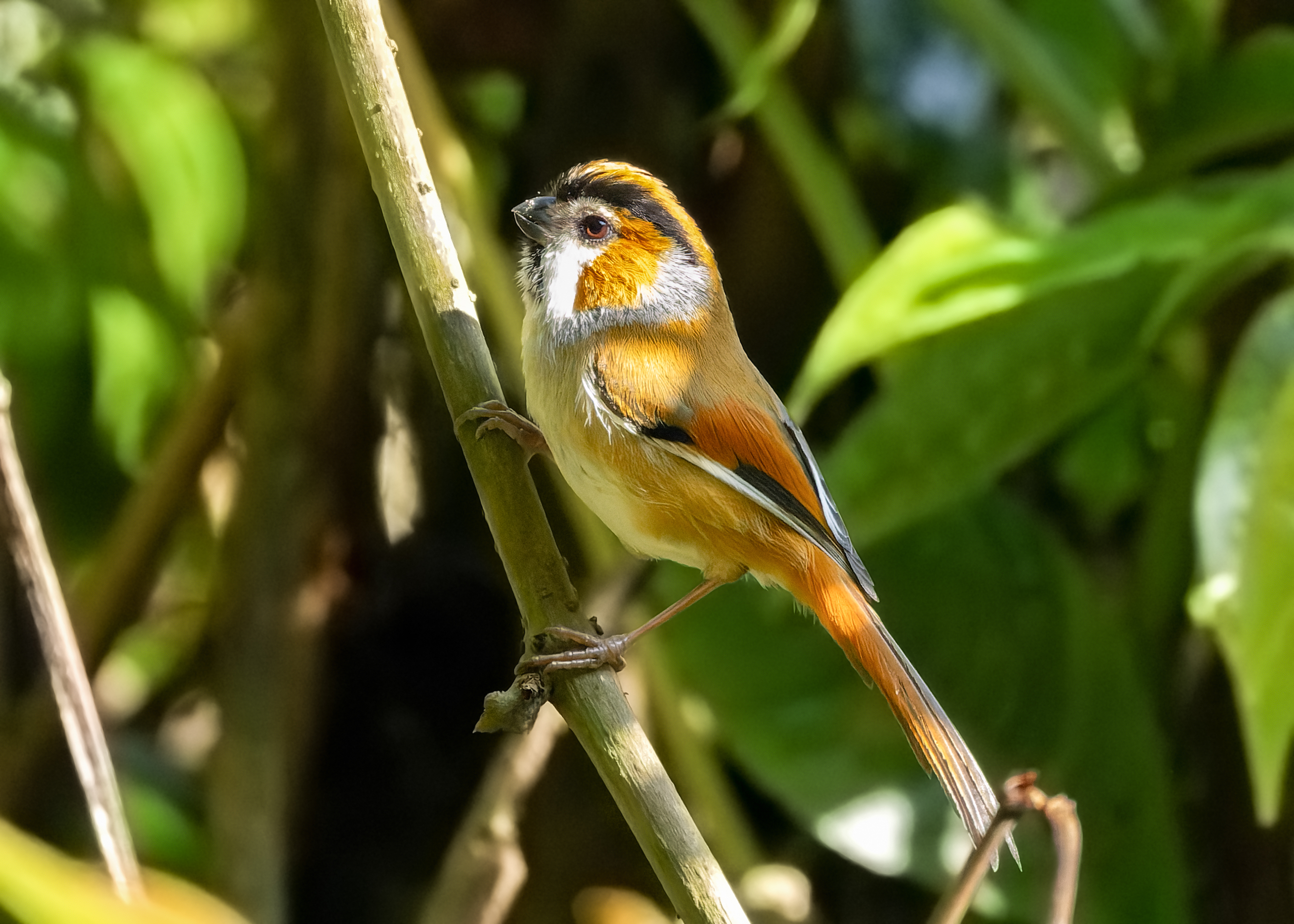
- Black-throated Parrotbill (Suthora nipalensis) in Kolakham, West Bengal, India.

Conservation status
- Least Concern (IUCN 3.1)

Scientific classification
- Kingdom: Animalia
- Phylum: Chordata
- Class: Aves
- Order: Passeriformes
- Family: Paradoxornithidae
- Genus: Suthora
- Species: S. nipalensis

Binomial name
- Suthora nipalensis (Hodgson, 1837)

Synonyms
- Paradoxornis nipalensis

= Black-throated parrotbill =

Species of bird

The black-throated parrotbill (Suthora nipalensis) is a bird species often placed with the Old World babblers (family Timaliidae) or in the family Sylviidae, but it actually seems to belong to the distinct family Paradoxornithidae.

It is found in the northern regions of the Indian subcontinent, primarily in the central and eastern Himalayas, and in adjoining parts of Southeast Asia. The species ranges across Bhutan, India, Laos, Myanmar, Nepal, Thailand, Tibet and Vietnam. Its natural habitat is subtropical or tropical moist montane forests.

== Gallery ==
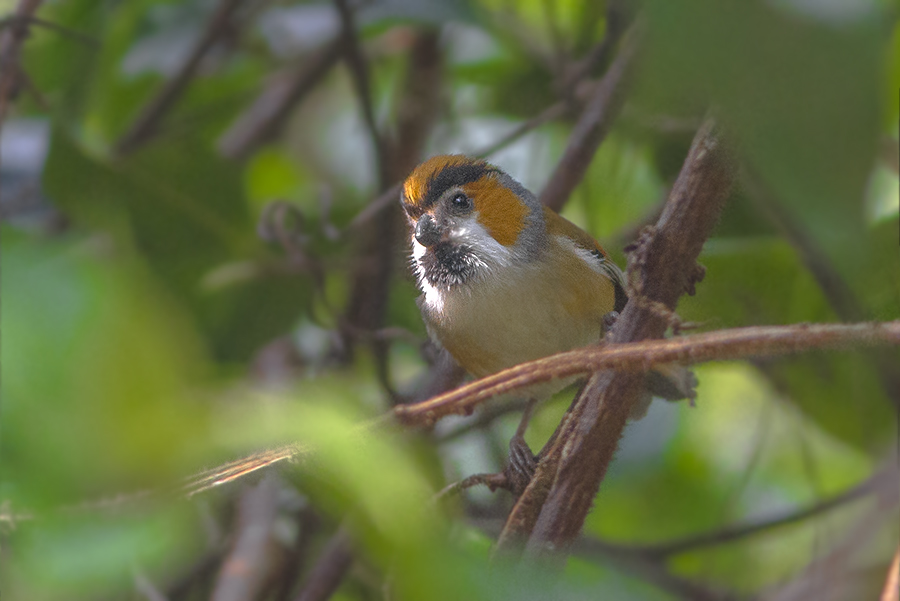
Paradoxornis nipalensis humii from Pangolakha Wildlife Sanctuary in Sikkim

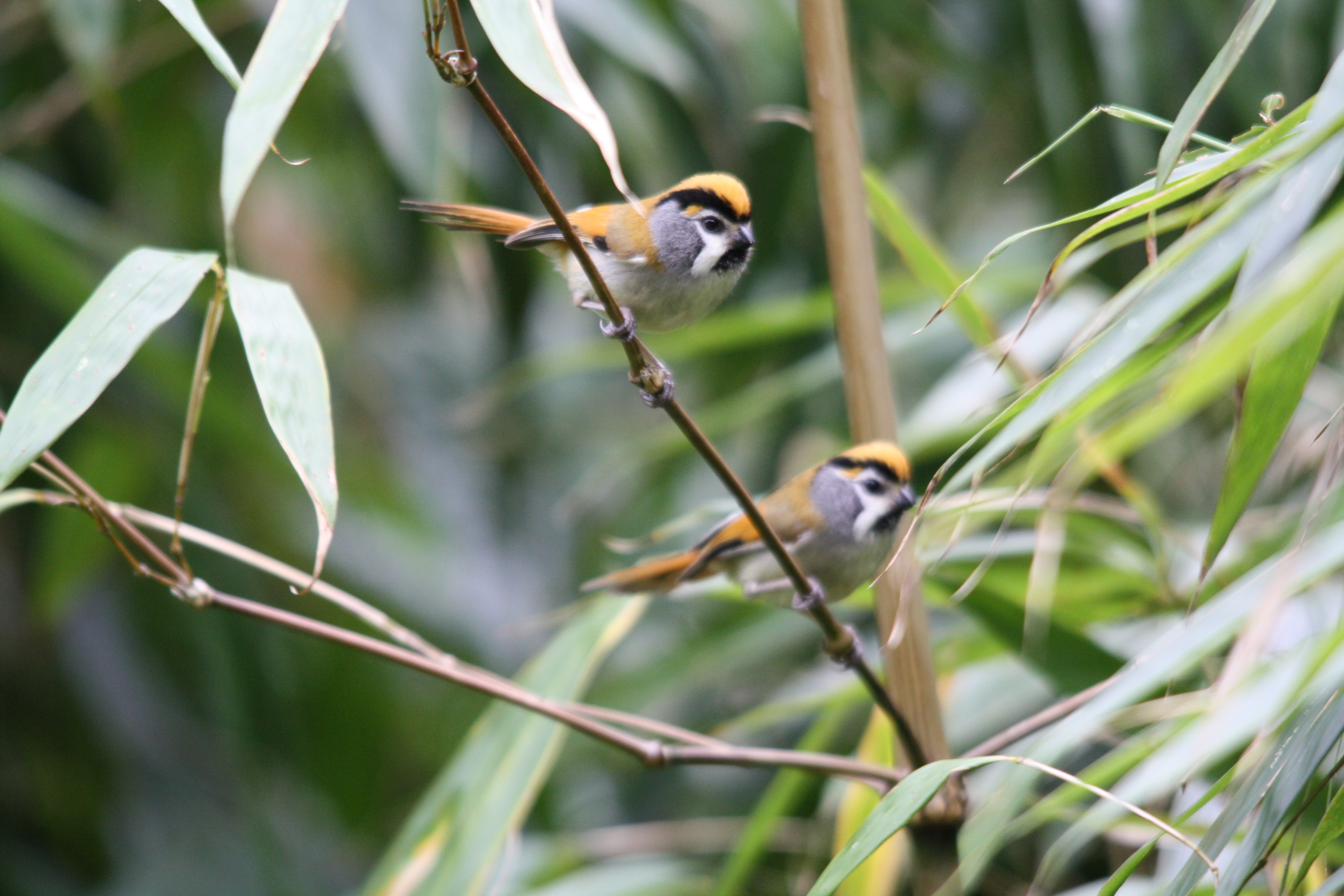
Paradoxornis nipalensis poliotis from Mishmi Hills in Arunachal Pradesh

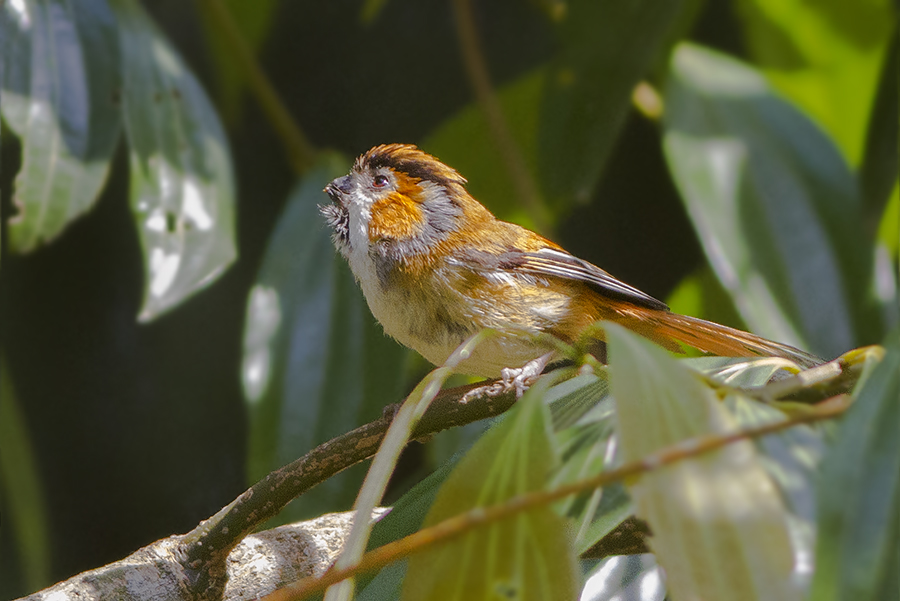
Paradoxornis nipalensis humii from Neora Valley National Park in West Bengal
