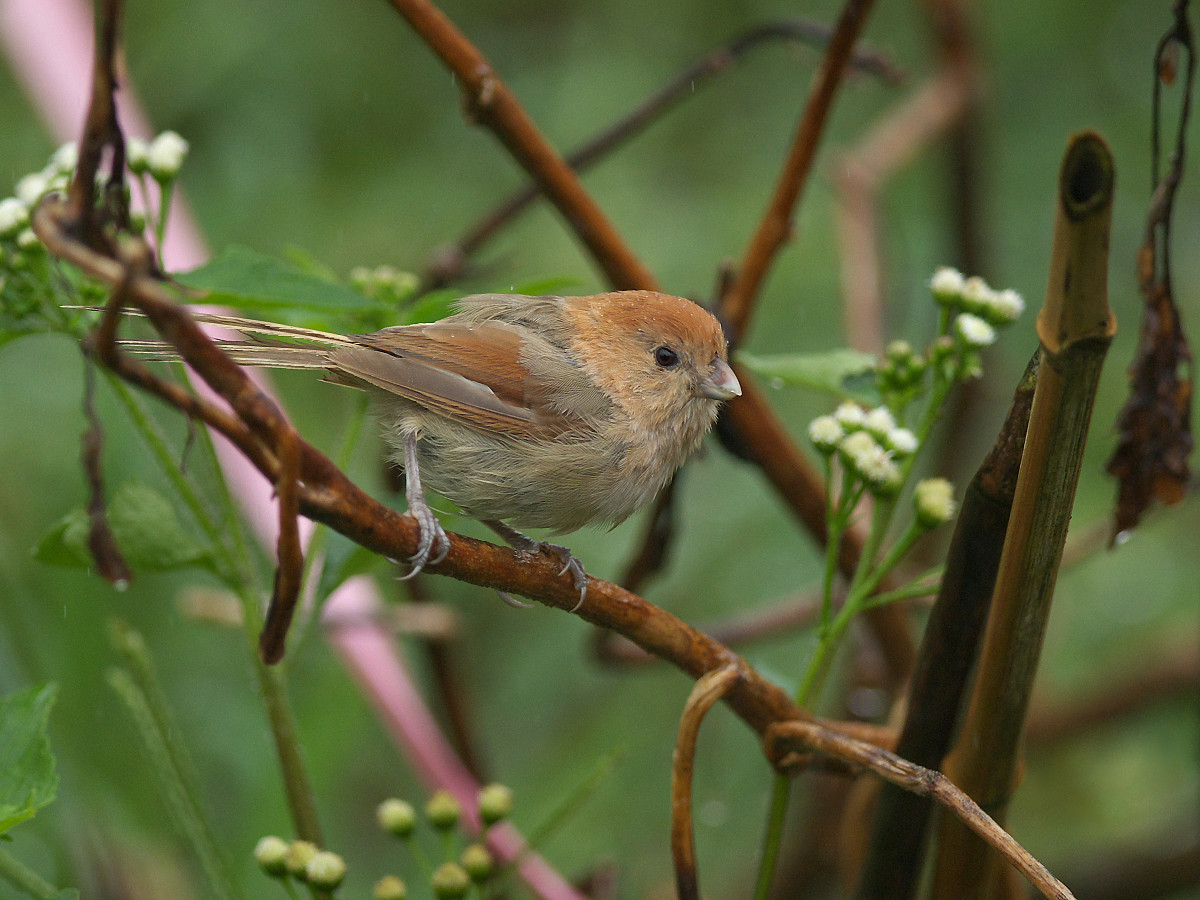
- Suthora webbiana bulomachus, Taiwan

Conservation status
- Least Concern (IUCN 3.1)

Scientific classification
- Kingdom: Animalia
- Phylum: Chordata
- Class: Aves
- Order: Passeriformes
- Family: Paradoxornithidae
- Genus: Suthora
- Species: S. webbiana

Binomial name
- Suthora webbiana Gould, 1852

Synonyms
- Sinosuthora webbiana Paradoxornis webbianus

= Vinous-throated parrotbill =

Species of bird

The vinous-throated parrotbill (Suthora webbiana) is a species of bird in the family Paradoxornithidae; formerly, it was placed in the closely related Sylviidae or Timaliidae. It is found in China, Korea, Russia, Taiwan, and Vietnam. Its natural habitat is subtropical or tropical moist montane forests.

== Taxonomy and systematics ==
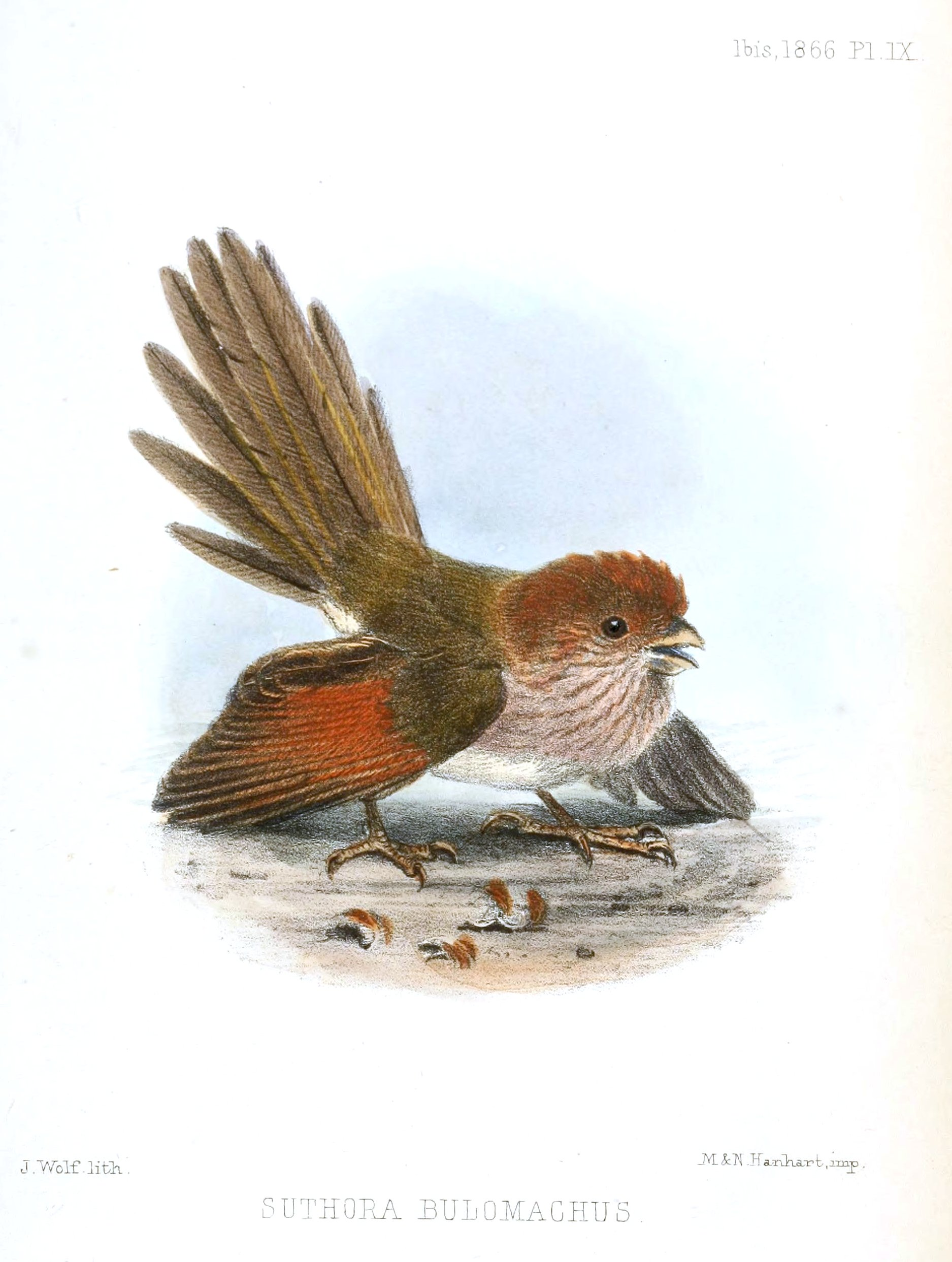
Illustration by Joseph Wolf (1866)

The vinous-throated parrotbill was described in 1852 by John Gould and placed in the genus Suthora, where it sat with other small browner parrotbills. Later parrotbills were merged into two genera, Conostoma and Paradoxornis; with this species being placed in Paradoxornis. Recent DNA studies have shown that the genus Paradoxornis is paraphyletic, and that it should be split. It is suggested that the vinous-throated parrotbill should be placed in the genus Sinosuthora. The vinous-throated parrotbill is very closely related to the ashy-throated parrotbill, and hybrids have been reported between the two species in Vietnam and China, as well as in Italy where both species have become established. It is now placed in its original genus, the Suthora in International Ornithologists' Union bird list 13.2.

The specific name webbiana commemorates the English botanist Philip Barker Webb. The species is sometimes referred to as Webb's parrotbill.

== Habitat and movements ==
The vinous-throated parrotbill occurs from northern Vietnam to southern Manchuria, and occupies a wide range of habitats across its range. It is generally found in somewhat open wooded habitats, including scrub, woodland of early successional to late mature secondary stages, forest edges, thickets and bamboo stands. It also occurs in hedges, reeds and marshes. They also will adapt to human modified habitats such as tea plantations and plant nurseries. In China it is found in lower montane areas. In Sichuan it is replaced at 1,000 m (3,300 ft) above sea level by the ashy-throated parrotbill, whereas in Taiwan, where it is the only species of parrotbill, it occurs from sea level to 3,100 m (10,200 ft) and occupies the widest niche of any bird on that island.

== Description ==
The vinous-throated parrotbill is a relatively small and long-tailed parrotbill. It measures between 11 and 12.5 cm (4.3–4.9 in) in length. The weight varies slightly by sex, with males weighing between 8.5 to 11 g (0.30–0.39 oz) and the females weighing 7 to 12 g (0.25–0.42 oz). The tail is graduated and like other parrotbills the bill is short and has the nostrils concealed by feather bristles. The plumage is similar for both sexes, which in the nominate is warm brown on the upperparts, dark brown on the wings (tinged with chestnut on the flight feathers). The upper breast and throat are pinkish-cream with brown streaks on the throat. The flanks are similar to the upperparts but slightly buffy, and the belly is cream-buff merging into the breast. The crown and forehead are rufescent brown, with a pale grey iris and the bill is either slate grey or brown with a paler or yellow tip.

== Behaviour ==
Like other parrotbills and indeed related babblers, the vinous-throated parrotbill is a highly social species, usually encountered in groups. These flocks vary in size through the year, being at their smallest during the breeding season and increasing to as many as 140 individual birds in the winter. The members of winter flocks in Taiwan were described by a study as having four categories of member: core members, which never left the flock; regular members, which generally stayed in the flock but visited or briefly joined other flocks; floaters, which moved around between flocks; and peripheral members, which were only seen for less than two months and were assumed to be visitors from other areas. The ranges of large winter flocks can overlap with that of other flocks and flocks passing close together retain their cohesion.
