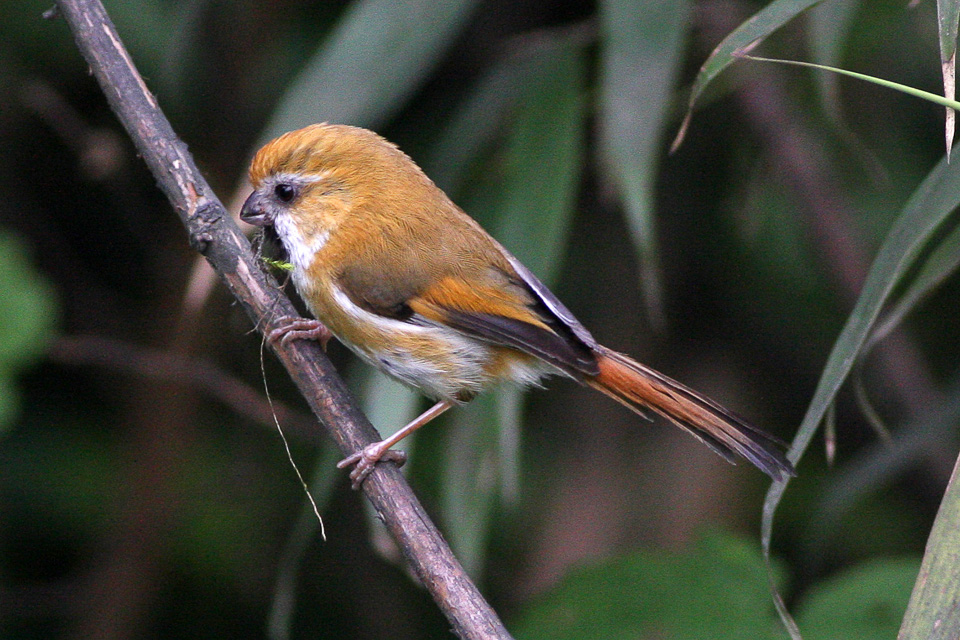
- In Sichuan

Conservation status
- Least Concern (IUCN 3.1)

Scientific classification
- Kingdom: Animalia
- Phylum: Chordata
- Class: Aves
- Order: Passeriformes
- Family: Paradoxornithidae
- Genus: Suthora
- Species: S. verreauxi

Binomial name
- Suthora verreauxi Sharpe, 1883

Synonyms
- Paradoxornis verreauxi

= Golden parrotbill =

Species of bird

The golden parrotbill (Suthora verreauxi) is a species of bird in the family Paradoxornithidae. It is found in China, Laos, Japan, Myanmar, Taiwan, and Vietnam. Its natural habitat is subtropical or tropical moist montane forests.

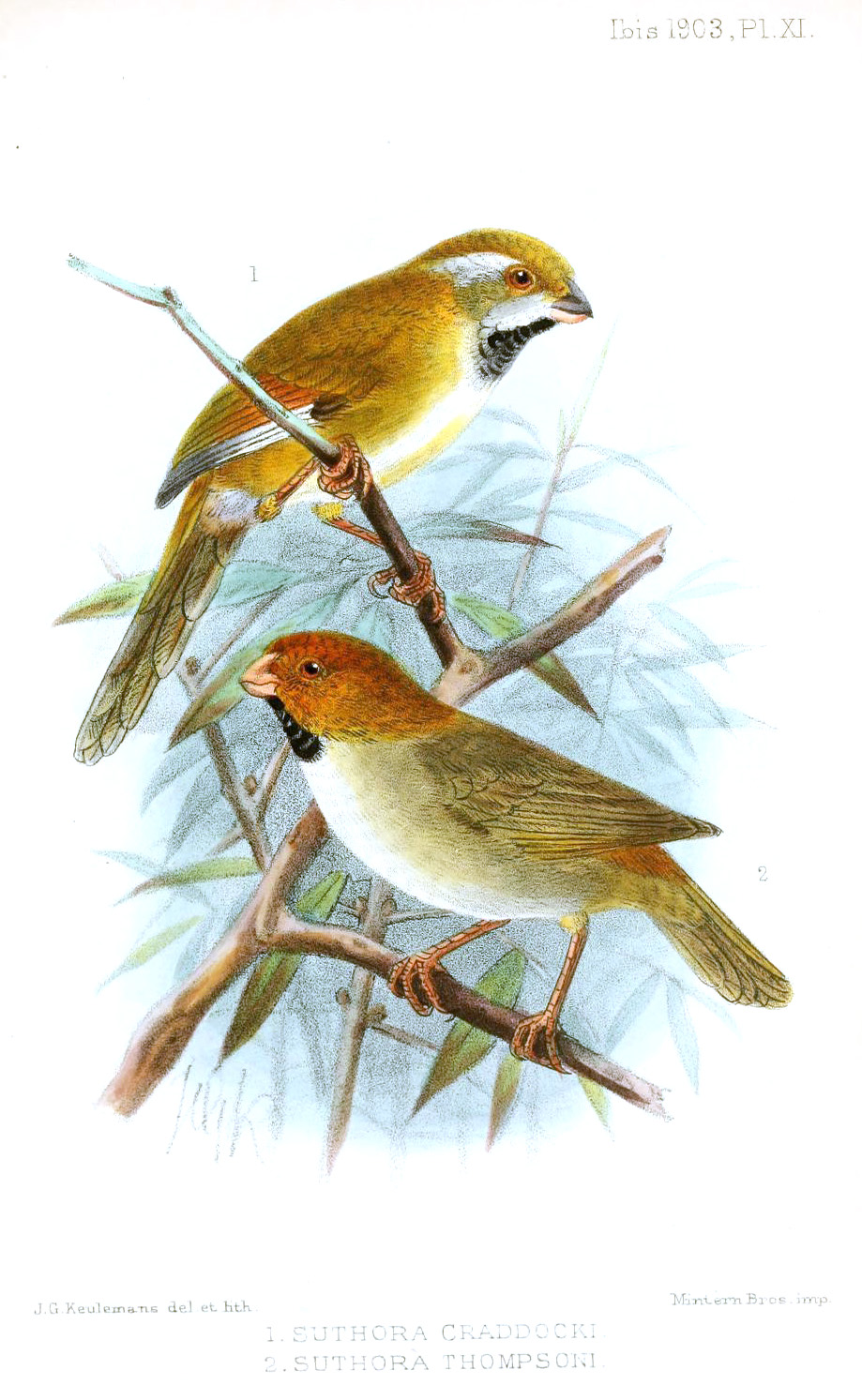
S. v. craddocki (above)

Its scientific name commemorates French ornithologist and collector Jules Verreaux.
