= List of protected areas of West Bengal =

Protected areas of West Bengal cover 4% of the state area. Forests make up 14% of the geographical area of West Bengal, which is lower than the national average of 33%. West Bengal has a wide variety of fauna, including Bengal tigers, Indian leopards, sloth and Himalayan black bears, chital and sambar (deer), Indian boars, pygmy hogs, Indian elephants, Indian peafowl, great Indian hornbills, Eurasian spoonbills, brahminy ducks, king and Indian cobras, white-lipped pit viper, Indian and reticulated pythons, mugger crocodiles, saltwater crocodiles, gharials, and many more. A huge montane forest, Dooars, is situated in the Northern West Bengal districts of Alipur Duar, Darjeeling, and Kalimpong. Part of the world's largest mangrove forest, Sundarbans, is located in southern West Bengal. There are 6 national parks and 15 wildlife sanctuaries in West Bengal.

== National Parks and Wildlife Sanctuaries ==
- Ballabhpur Wildlife Sanctuary
- Bethuadahari Wildlife Sanctuary
- Bibhutibhushan Wildlife Sanctuary
- Buxa Tiger Reserve
- Chapramari Wildlife Sanctuary
- Chilapata Forest
- Chintamoni Kar Bird Sanctuary
- Gorumara National Park
- Haliday Island Wildlife Sanctuary
- Jaldapara National Park
- Jore Pokhri Wildlife Sanctuary
- Lothian Island Wildlife Sanctuary
- Mahananda Wildlife Sanctuary
- Neora Valley National Park
- Narendrapur Wildlife Sanctuary
- Pakhi Bitan Wildlife Sanctuary
- Raiganj Wildlife Sanctuary
- Ramnabagan Wildlife Sanctuary
- Rasikbil Bird Sanctuary
- Sajnekhali Wildlife Sanctuary
- Senchal Wildlife Sanctuary
- Singalila National Park
- Sundarbans National Park
- Mayurjharna Elephant Reserve

== Fauna ==
A number of endangered animals live in the forests of the Dooars (a montane forest of Northern West Bengal), like Bengal tiger and Indian rhinoceros. Other animals are Indian elephant, chital (spotted or axis deer), sambar, Indian muntjac, White-bellied musk deer, Indian hog deer, Indian pangolin, Chinese pangolin, masked palm civet, Malabar giant squirrel, Himalayan porcupine, clouded leopard, Indian leopard, and gaur. Some birds are Indian peacock, kalij pheasant, blood pheasant, yellow-footed green pigeon, chestnut-breasted partridge, scarlet minivet, satyr tragopan, fire-tailed myzornis, rufous-throated partridge, Darjeeling woodpecker, Bay woodpecker, Bengal florican, red junglefowl, dark-throated thrush, rufous-gorgeted flycatcher, white-gorgeted flycatcher, white-browed bush robin, white-tailed robin, yellow-browed tit, striated bulbul, chestnut-headed tesia, chestnut-crowned warbler, black-faced warbler, black-faced laughingthrush, chestnut-crowned laughingthrush, streak-breasted scimitar babbler, scaly-breasted cupwing, pygmy cupwing, rufous-fronted babbler, black-headed shrike babbler, white-browed shrike-babbler, rusty-fronted barwing, rufous-winged fulvetta, brown parrotbill, fire-breasted flowerpecker, fire-tailed sunbird, maroon-backed accentor, dark-breasted rosefinch, red-headed bullfinch, gold-naped finch, golden-throated barbet, Hodgson's hawk cuckoo, lesser cuckoo, brown wood owl, ashy wood pigeon, mountain imperial pigeon, Jerdon's baza, rose-ringed parakeet, Rufous-necked hornbill, Oriental pied hornbill, Finn's weaver (Finn's baya), sunbird, spangled drongo, Indian paradise flycatcher (Himalayan subspecies), and great Indian hornbill. Reptiles include the Bengal monitor, Indian Python, Indian cobra, king cobra, white-lipped pit viper, common krait, brahminy blind snake, common vine snake, and reticulated python. Lesser cat species include fishing cat, jungle cat, Asian golden cat, and leopard cat. Bear species like sloth bear and Himalayan black bear live up north. The red panda, rhesus macaque, Assam macaque, Tarai grey langur, Northern plains gray langur, and binturong are some arboreal creatures, and swine include pygmy hog and Indian boar. Bengal fox, Indian jackal, Indian wolf, and spotted linsang are some of the predators besides tigers. The hispid hare is a very rare species which is found here. Leopard cat and Asian golden cat have been recorded. Up north, Himalayan tahr, Bhutan takin, Himalayan goral, and Himalayan serow are found.

In rivers, mugger crocodiles and gharial have been seen. In lakes, Eurasian spoonbill, brahminy duck, Northern pintail, swan goose, storks, such as painted stork, Asian openbill, lesser adjutant, and black stork, black-crowned night heron, black-necked crane, common merganser, Eurasian teal, Indian cormorant, Red-naped ibis, common kingfisher, white-throated kingfisher, and predatory birds like Indian vulture, griffon vulture, white-backed vulture, crested eagle, black eagle, mountain hawk eagle, Pallas's fish eagle, and shikra have been discovered.

The Buxa Tiger Reserve is famous for butterflies, like Indian cabbage white, bamboo treebrown, and five-bar swordtail, while Jore Pokhri Wildlife Sanctuary is the last refuge for Himalayan salamander (or newt). Pokhari Lake supports species of catfish. There have been recent sightings of the Ussuri dhole in Jaldapara National Park of Dooars as well. Sightings of black panther in the forests of Dooars are not uncommon. Jaldapara National Park has the largest Indian rhinoceros population in the world after Kaziranga National Park. The East Kolkata Wetlands in Kolkata is home to the small Indian mongoose, Asian palm civet, small Indian civet, lesser whistling duck, purple heron, grey heron, great egret, little egret, and many more waterfowl and waders.

The Sajnekhali Wildlife Sanctuary is home to smooth-coated otter, Asian water monitor, and many birds like little heron and green imperial pigeon [1]. In addition to the Bengal tiger and fishing cat (the state animal of West Bengal), the Sundarbans host many other endangered species like the Ganges river dolphin, northern river terrapin, saltwater crocodile, olive ridley turtle, green sea turtle, hawksbill turtle, and barred mudskipper. The mangrove forest also acts as a natural fish nursery, supporting coastal fishes such as common carp, rice paddy eel, butter fish, largetooth sawfish, and electric ray along the Bay of Bengal. Crabs include fiddler crab, king crab, and hermit crab [1 & 2].

In the rural areas like Midnapore, the smooth-coated otter, Indian crested porcupine, and white-breasted waterhen are common. The Brahman cattle and domestic water buffalo are seen in streets, along with Indian pariah dogs. Blackbucks are found near Midnapore as well.

Beautiful and exotic birds inhabit Chintamoni Kar Bird Sanctuary, such as brown fish owl, bronzed drongo, Asian green bee-eater, stork-billed kingfisher, common emerald dove, and white-throated fantail, as well as butterflies like peacock pansy, striped tiger, common emigrant, and tarucus.

The oxbow lake of Purbasthali has a bird sanctuary containing various types of waterbirds, including red-crested pochard, white-browed wagtail, bronze-winged jacana, grey-headed swamphen, common coot, and osprey.

The lake in Santragachhi, called Santragachhi Jheel, is home to migratory birds like sarus crane, gadwall, northern shoveller, northern pintail, garganey, cotton pygmy goose, and knob-billed duck.

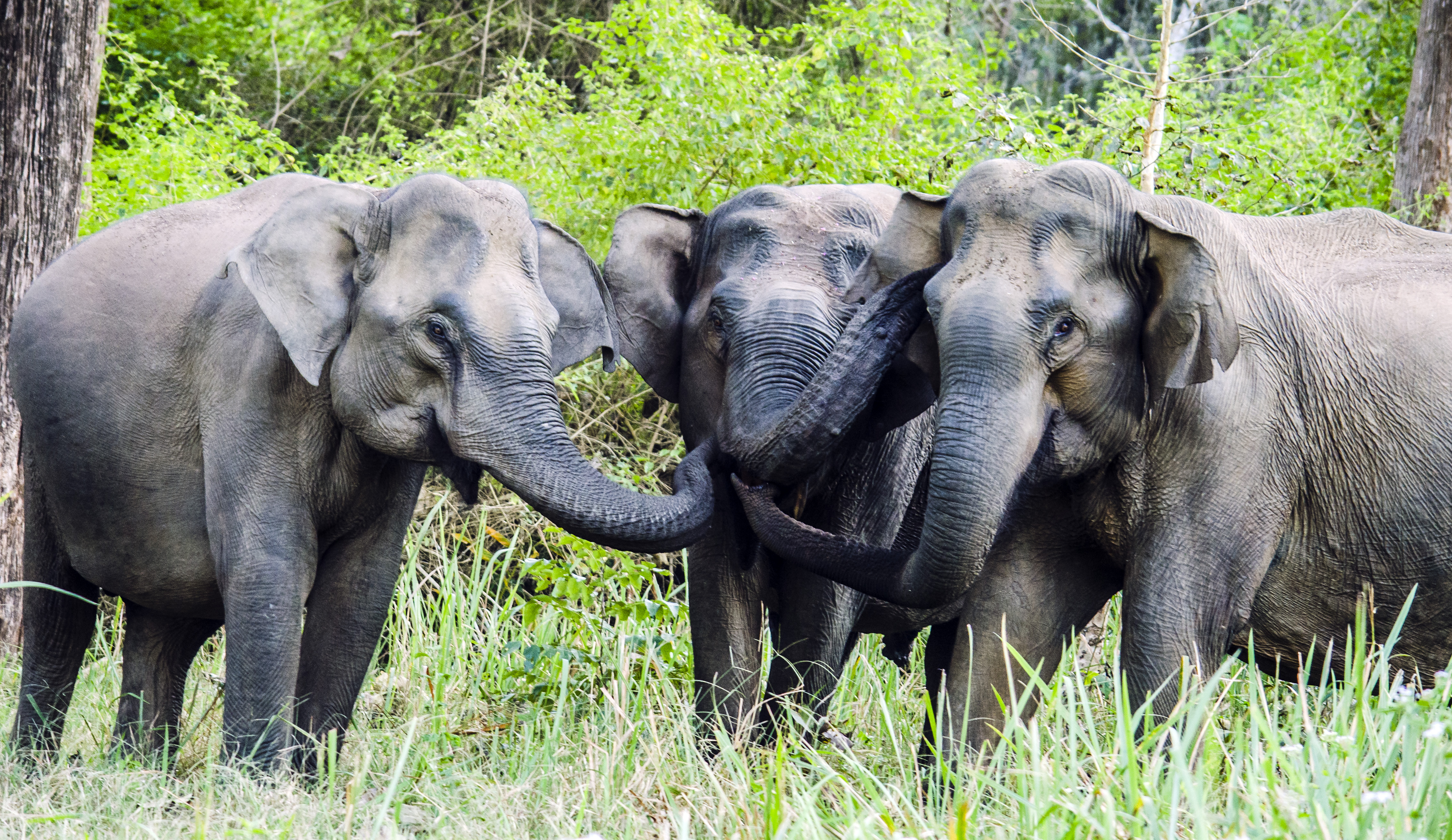
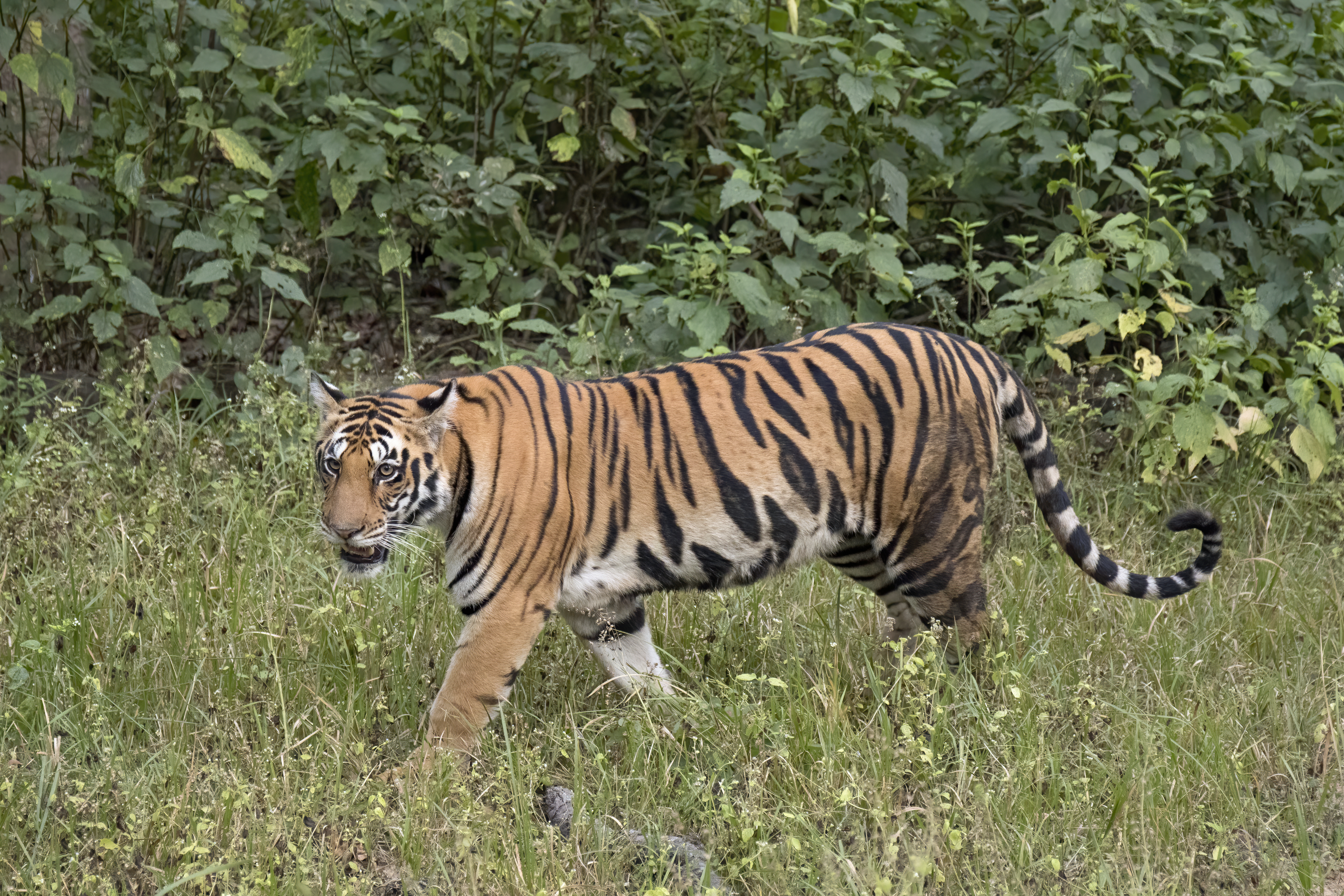
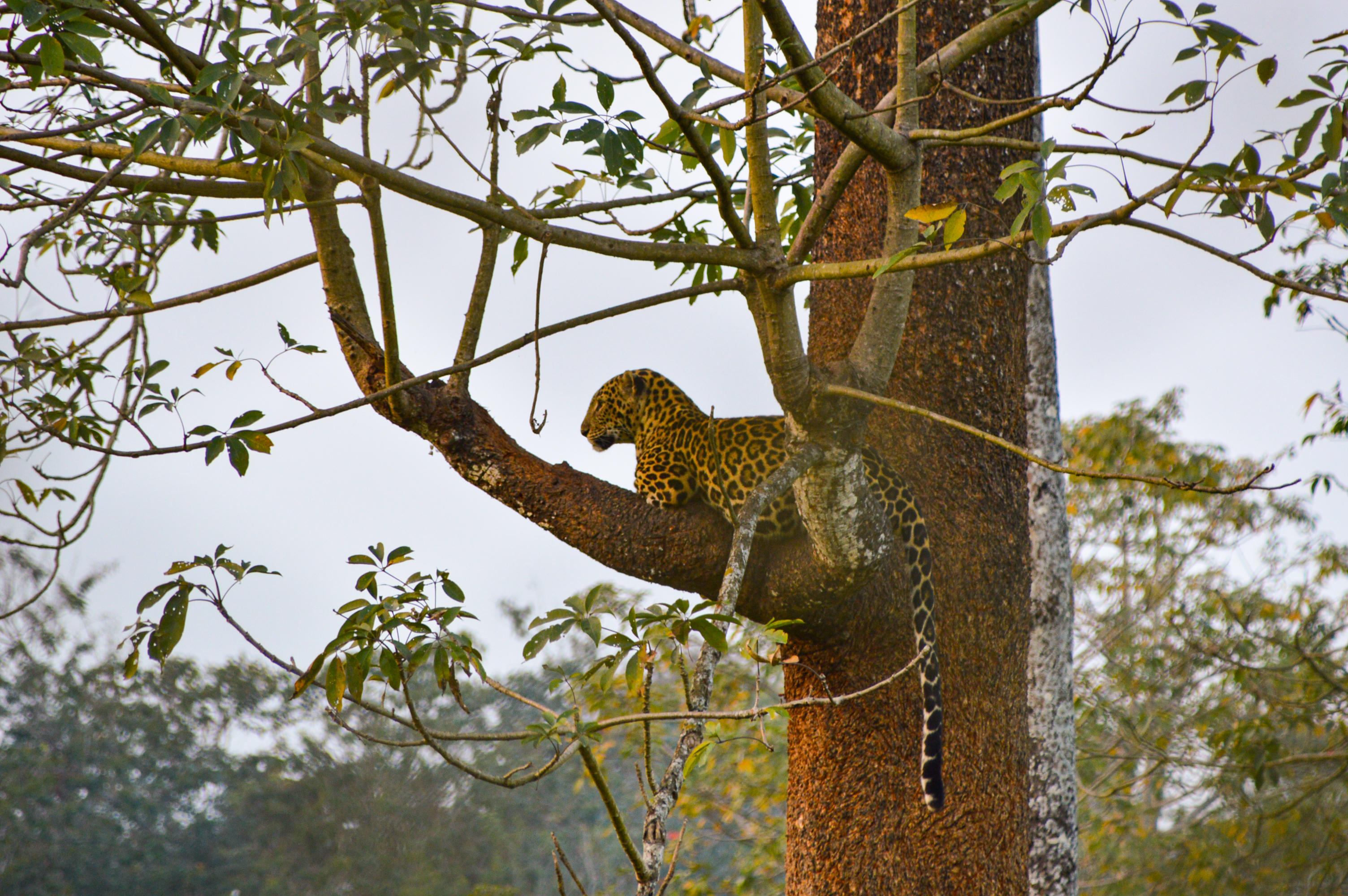
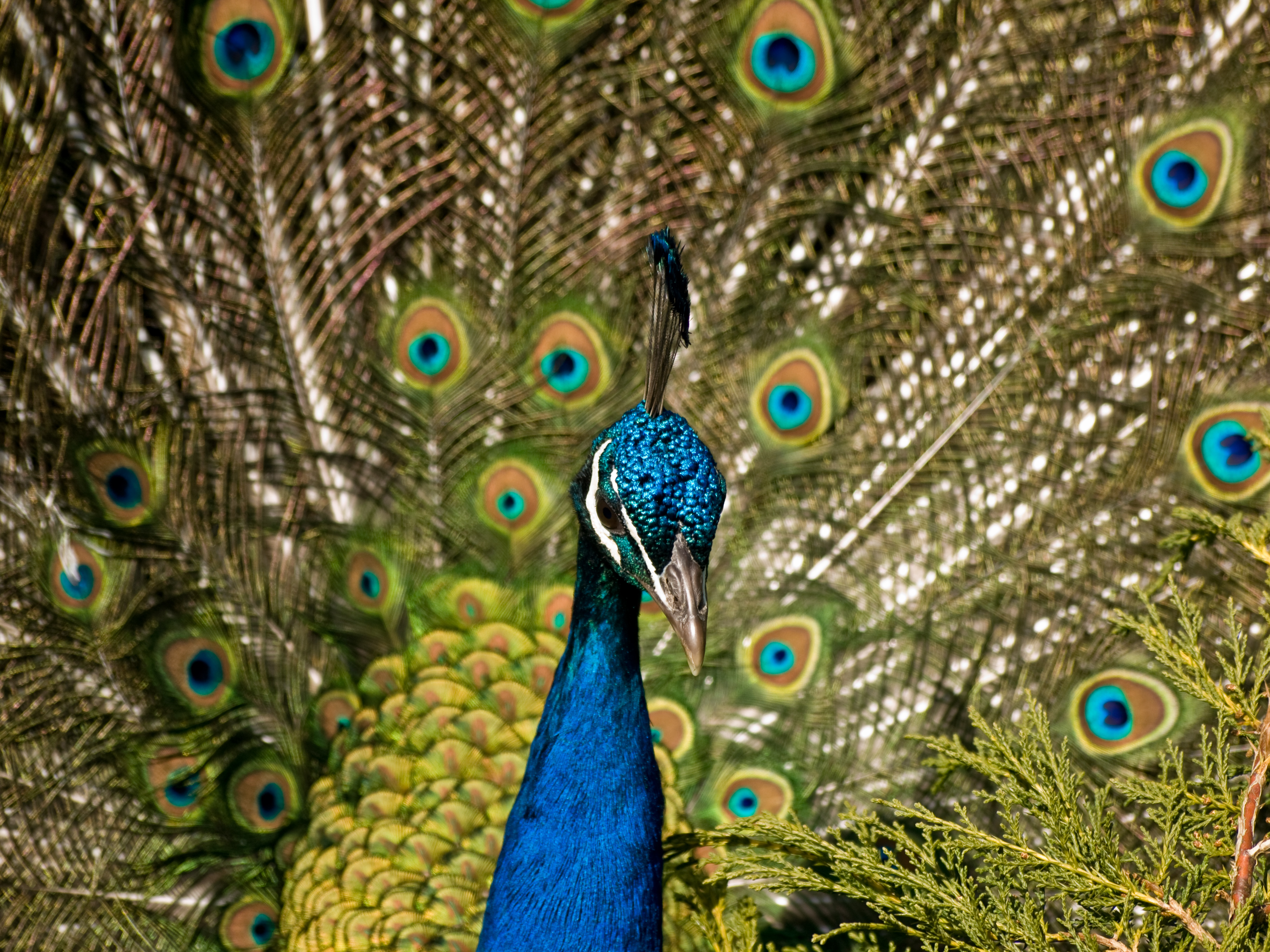
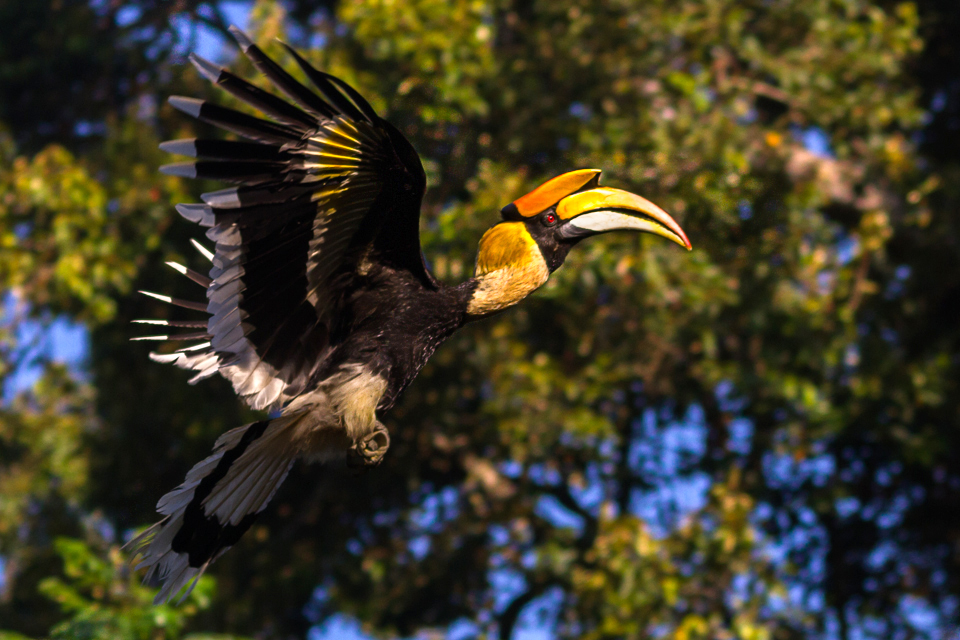

== Flora ==
From a phytogeographic viewpoint, the southern part of West Bengal can be divided into two regions: the Gangetic plain and the littoral mangrove forests of the Sundarbans. The alluvial soil of the Gangetic plain compounded with favorable rainfall make this region especially fertile. Much of the vegetation of the western part of the state shares floristic similarities with the plants of the Chota Nagpur Plateau in the adjoining state of Jharkhand. The predominant commercial tree species is Shorea robusta, commonly known as sal. The coastal region of Purba Medinipur exhibits coastal vegetation; the predominant tree is the Casuarina. The most valuable tree from the Sundarbans is the ubiquitous sundri (Heritiera fomes) from which the forest gets its name. Vegetation in northern West Bengal is dictated by elevation and precipitation. For example, the foothills of the Himalayas, the Dooars, are densely wooded with Sal and other trees of the tropical evergreen type [3]. Above 1,000 m (3,300 ft), the forest type changes to subtropical. In Darjeeling, which is above 1,500 m (4,900 ft), common trees typifying the temperate forest are oaks, conifers, and rhododendrons. Bamboo gardens are common throughout West Bengal, as are trees such as coconut, palm, date, banyan, peepal, ashok, seemul, devil's tree, and many more. Lotus flower and water hyacinth is very common in lakes and ponds. Species of elephant grass create large grasslands near Dooars.
