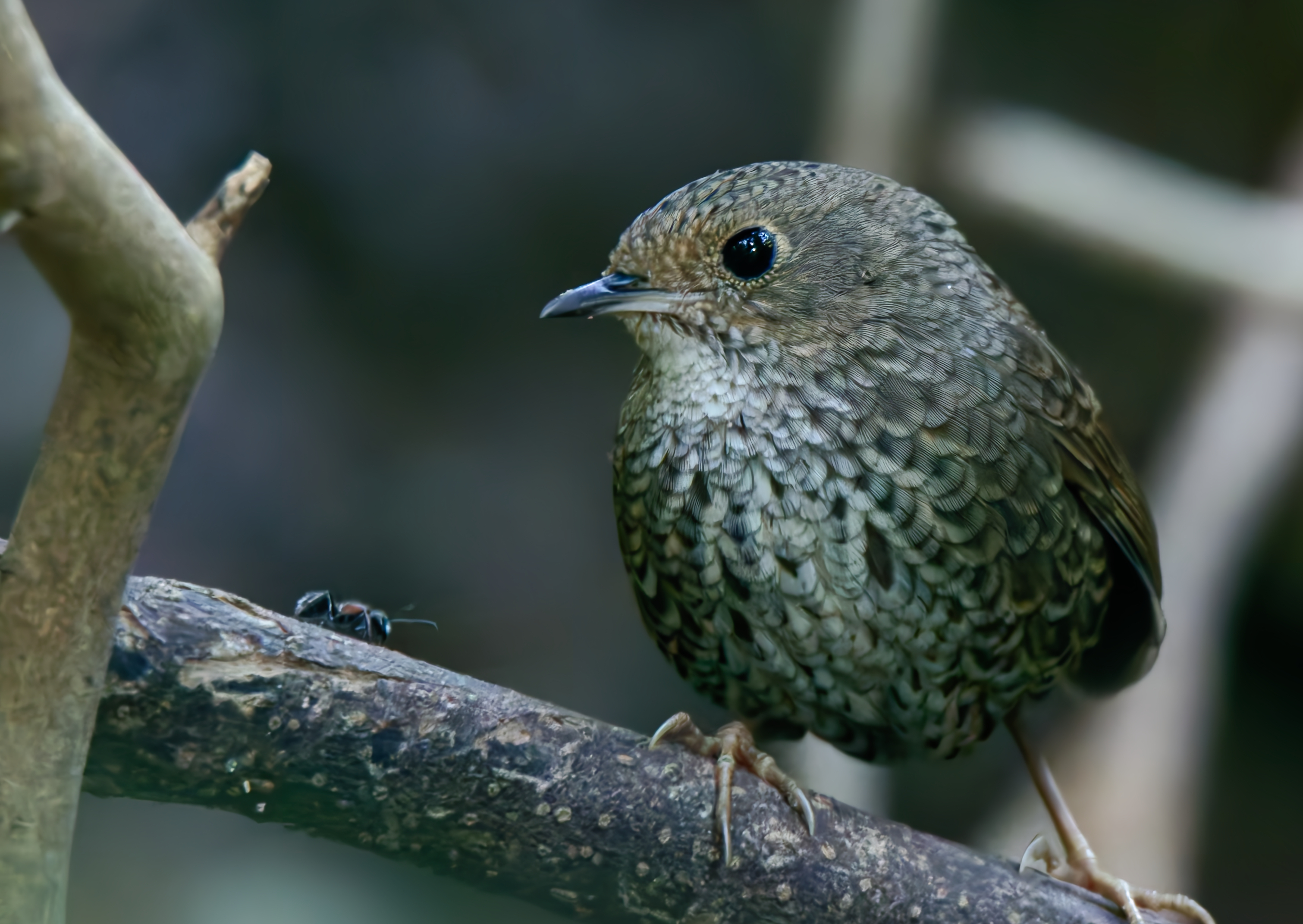
- at Dehradun, India

Conservation status
- Least Concern (IUCN 3.1)

Scientific classification
- Kingdom: Animalia
- Phylum: Chordata
- Class: Aves
- Order: Passeriformes
- Family: Pnoepygidae
- Genus: Pnoepyga
- Species: P. immaculata

Binomial name
- Pnoepyga immaculata Martens, J & Eck, 1991
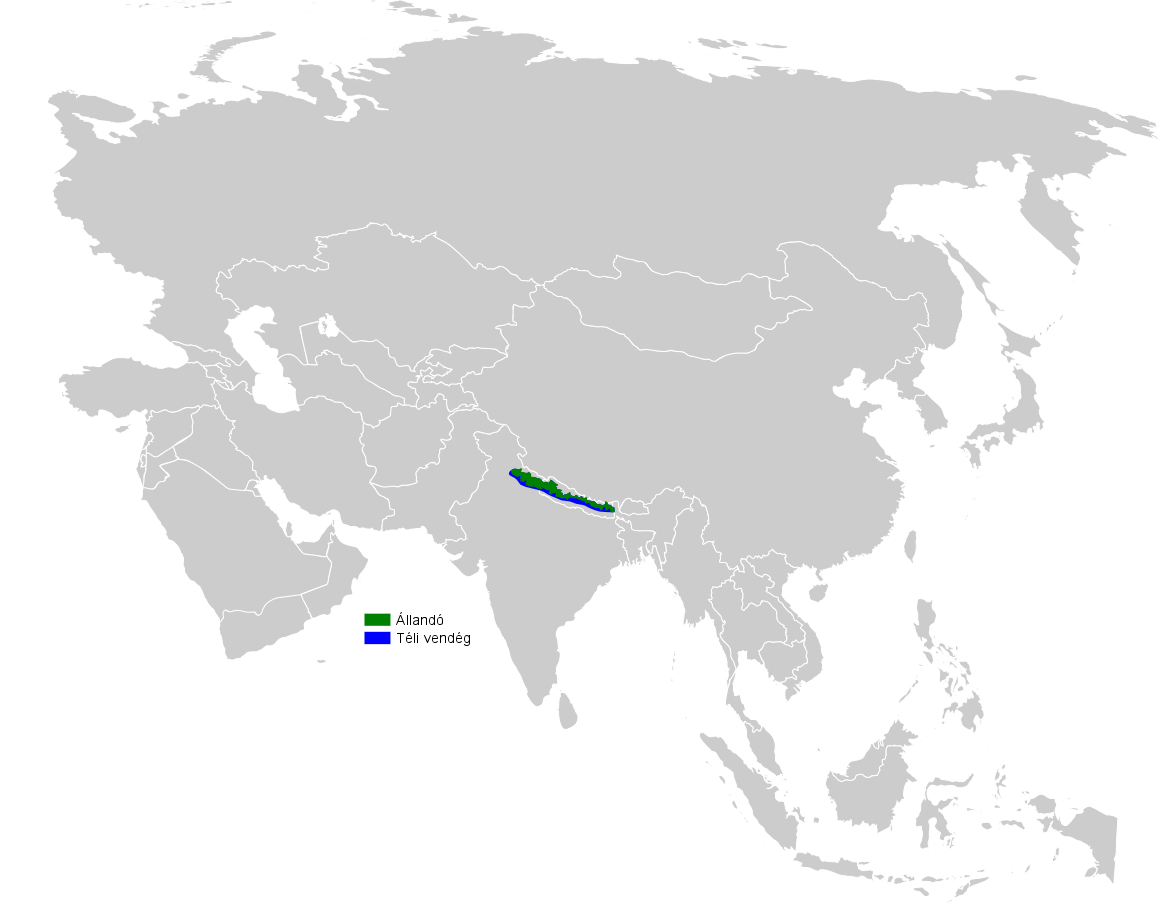

= Nepal cupwing =

Species of bird

The Nepal cupwing (Pnoepyga immaculata), also known as the Nepal wren-babbler or immaculate cupwing, is a small species of passerine bird in the family Pnoepygidae. It is native to Uttarakhand, Himachal Pradesh, Tibet, and Nepal. It is found in dense montane forest in the Himalayas.

== Nomenclature and taxonomy ==
The Nepal cupwing is in the genus Pnyoepyga. Its closest relatives are the scaly-breasted cupwing, Taiwan cupwing, and pygmy cupwing. It was first described by Jochen Martens and Siegfried Eck in 1991, having been identified as a separate species based on differences in voice. Genetic phylogeny suggests that it forms a clade with the pygmy cupwing. No subspecies have been described. It was formerly classified, with the other cuplings, as an Old World babbler in the family Timaliidae until 2009, when the monotypic family Pneopygidae was created for the cupwings, reflecting recent developments in molecular phylogeny.

The name "Nepal cupwing" is used by the International Ornithologist's Union and by the Handbook of the Birds of the World, while "immaculate cupwing" is used in American English and in Indian English, including The Clements Checklist of Birds of the World. The name "Nepal wren-babbler' was formerly used by these taxonomic authorities but is no longer in official use.

== Description ==
The Nepal cupwing is small, measuring 8.5cm—10cm in length, and is brownish-olive in colouration. It has dark scaling on the upperparts and paler scaling on the underparts, a scaly breast with brown central feathers, pale edging on the flight feathers, and a very short tail. External morphology is very similar to the other species, to a degree where identification within the field relies upon vocalizations. The song is distinctive, being higher pitched than the other species in the genus and consisting of a steady series of thin, short, rapid, modulated whistles that descend in pitch.

== Distribution and habitat ==
This species is native to the foothills of the Himalayas. It is a regular resident in Uttarakhand, Himachal Pradesh, and Nepal, and an uncommon resident around Zhangmu in Tibet. Preferred habitat is dense understorey in median and low mountain elevations. It is not migratory, but altitudinal movements do occur, as they winter down to 250 metres. It occurs regularly between 1800 and 2200 metres, and possibly breeds as high as 3100 metres. Generally, this species prefers dark forest and keeps to the forest floor. Its conservation status is Least Concern.
