= Outline of West Bengal =

Overview of and topical guide to West Bengal

Location of West Bengal

The following outline is provided as an overview of and topical guide to West Bengal:

West Bengal – state in eastern India and is the nation's fourth-most populous state, with over 91 million inhabitants. Spread over 34,267 sq mi (88,750 km^{2}), it is bordered by the countries of Bangladesh, Nepal and Bhutan, and the Indian states of Odisha, Jharkhand, Bihar, Sikkim, and Assam. The state capital is Kolkata (Calcutta), one of the largest cities in India. Together with the neighbouring nation of Bangladesh, it makes up the ethno-linguistic region of Bengal.

== General reference ==
=== Names ===
- Common name: West Bengal
  - Pronunciation: /bɛnˈɡɔːl/
  - In Bengali: Pōścimabôṅgô, pronounced [ˈpoʃtʃimˈbɔŋɡo]
- Abbreviations and name codes
  - ISO 3166-2 code: IN-WB
  - Vehicle registration code: WB
- Nicknames
  - Bengal
- Adjectivals
  - West Bengal
  - Bengali

=== Rankings (amongst India's states) ===
- by population: 4th
- by area (2011 census): 14th
- by crime rate (2015): 17th
- by gross domestic product (GDP) (2014): 4th
- by Human Development Index (HDI): 11th
- by life expectancy at birth:
- by literacy rate (2011):76.62%

== Geography of West Bengal ==
Geography of West Bengal

- West Bengal is: an Indian state
- Population of West Bengal: 91,347,736
- Area of West Bengal: 88,750 km^{2}
- Atlas of West Bengal

=== Location of West Bengal ===
- West Bengal is situated within the following regions:
  - Northern Hemisphere
  - Eastern Hemisphere
    - Eurasia
      - Asia
        - South Asia
          - India
            - East India
- Time zone: Indian Standard Time (UTC+05:30)

=== Environment of West Bengal ===
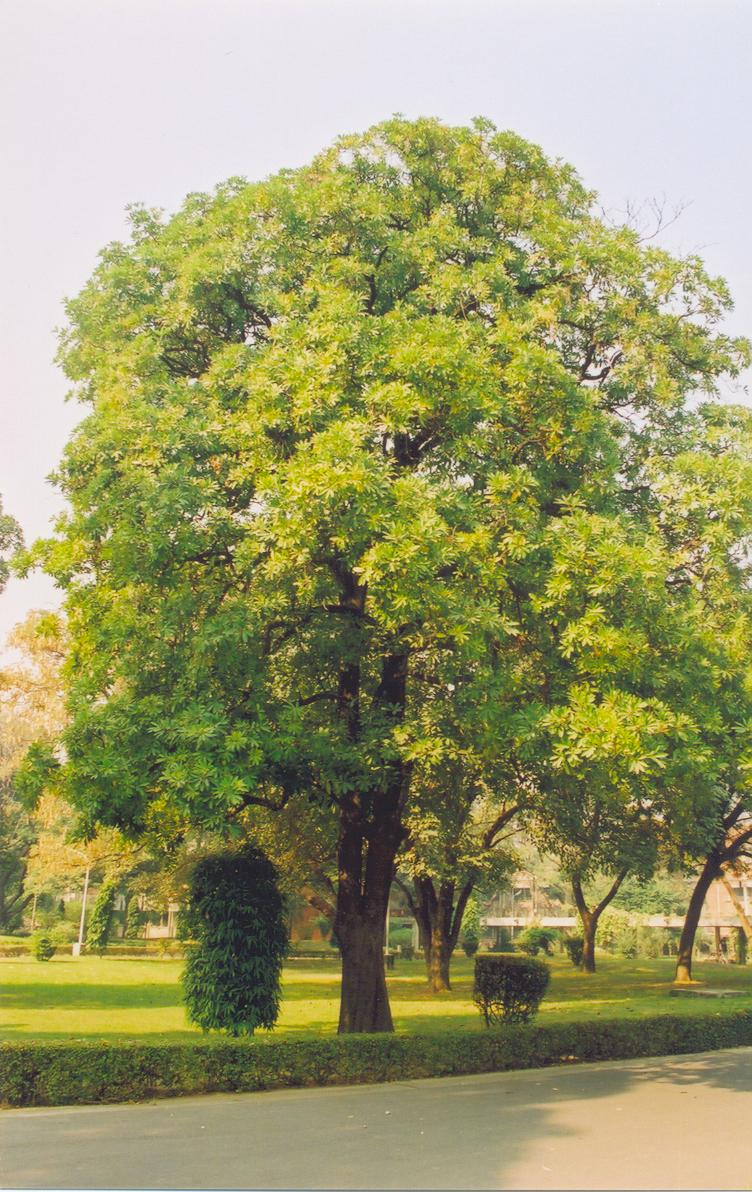
Alstonia scholaris

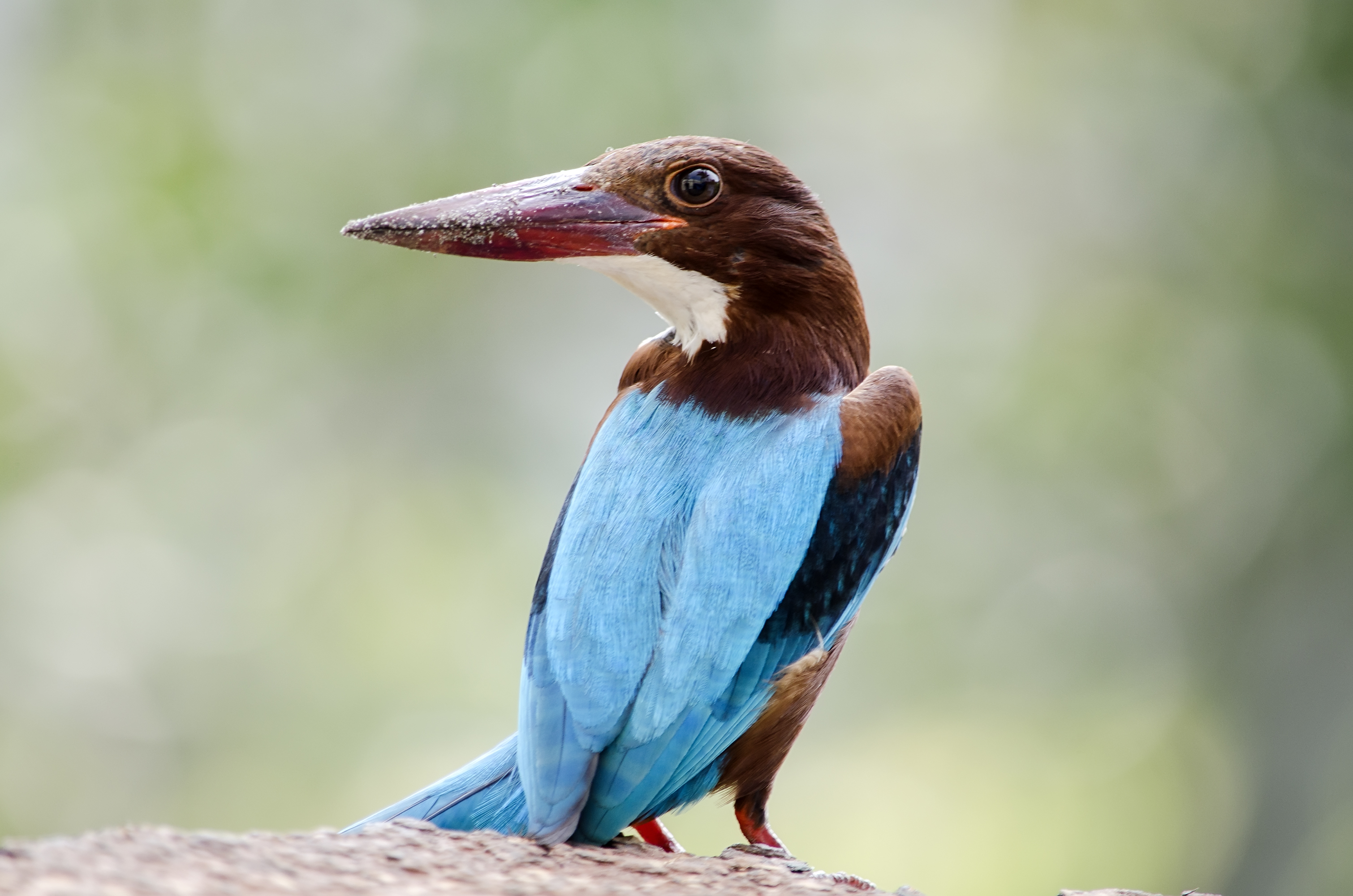
White-throated kingfisher

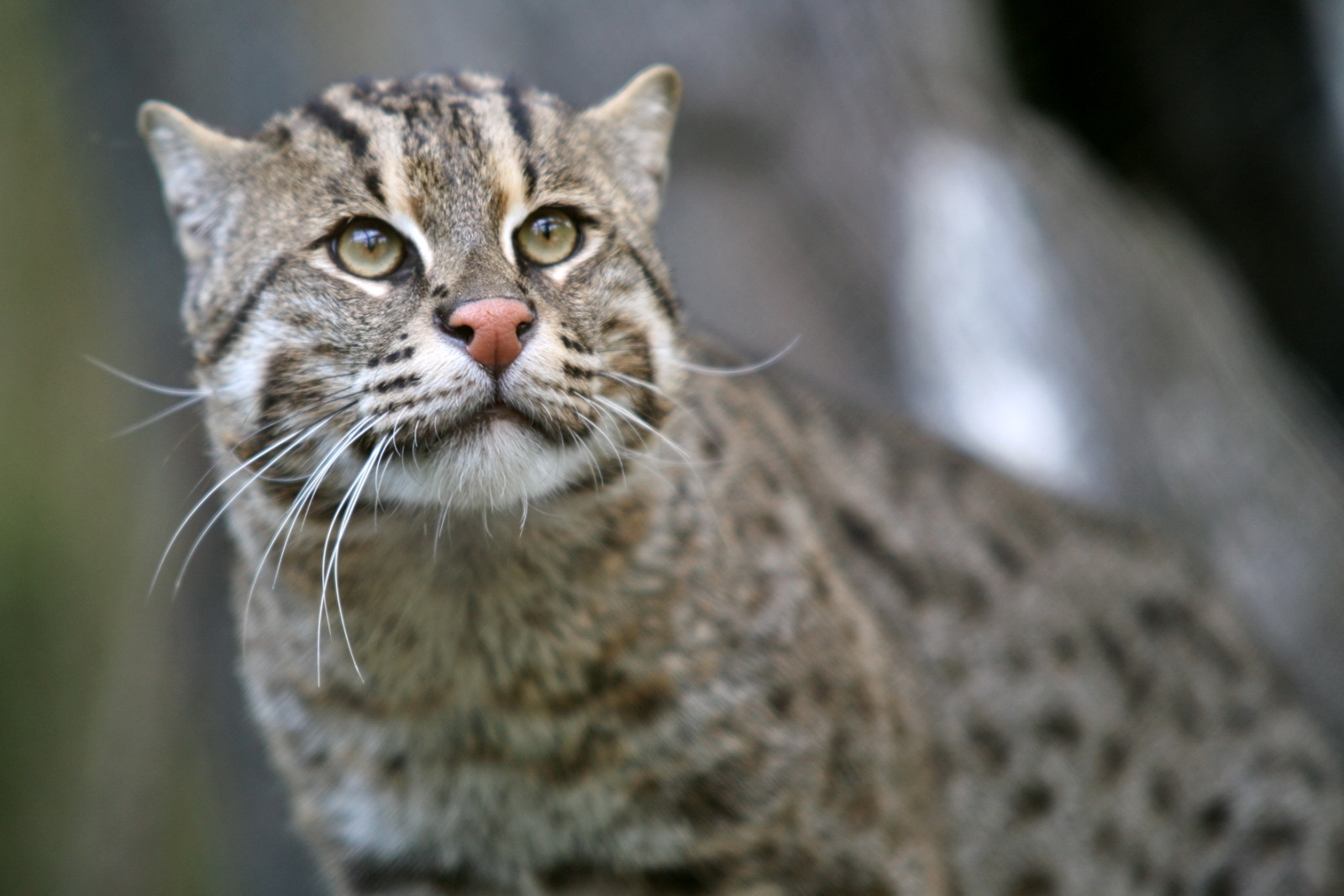
Fishing cat

- Climate of West Bengal
- Protected areas of West Bengal
- Wildlife of West Bengal

==== Natural geographic features of West Bengal ====
- Rivers of West Bengal

=== Administrative divisions of West Bengal ===
==== Capital of West Bengal ====
Kolkata

==== Divisions of West Bengal ====
- Jalpaiguri division
- Burdwan division
- Presidency division
- Malda division
- Medinipur division

==== Districts of West Bengal ====
Districts of West Bengal

Districts of West Bengal

- Alipurduar district
- Bankura
- Purba Bardhaman
- Paschim Bardhaman
- Birbhum
- Cooch Behar
- Darjeeling
- Kalimpong
- Purba Medinipur (East Midnapore)
- Hooghly
- Howrah
- Jalpaiguri
- Kolkata
- Malda
- Murshidabad
- Nadia
- North 24 Parganas
- Uttar Dinajpur
- Purulia
- South 24 Parganas
- Dakshin Dinajpur
- Jhargram
- Paschim Medinipur (West Midnapore)

===== Cities of West Bengal =====
- Municipal Corporations of West Bengal
- Municipalities of West Bengal
- Cities of West Bengal

=== Demography of West Bengal ===
Demographics of West Bengal

== Government and politics of West Bengal ==
Politics of West Bengal

- Form of government: Indian state government (parliamentary system of representative democracy)
- Capital of West Bengal: Kolkata
- Elections in West Bengal
  - (specific elections)

=== Union government in West Bengal ===
- Rajya Sabha members from West Bengal
- 2009 Indian general election in West Bengal
- 2014 Indian general election in West Bengal
- 2019 Indian general election in West Bengal
- 2024 Indian general election in West Bengal

=== Branches of the government of West Bengal ===
Government of West Bengal

==== Executive branch of the government of West Bengal ====
- Head of state: Governor of West Bengal
- Head of government: Chief Minister of West Bengal
- Council of Ministers of West Bengal

==== Legislative branch of the government of West Bengal ====
West Bengal Legislative Assembly

- Constituencies of West Bengal Legislative Assembly

=== Law and order in West Bengal ===
- Law enforcement in West Bengal
  - West Bengal Police

== History of West Bengal ==
History of West Bengal

== Culture of West Bengal ==
Culture of West Bengal

- Architecture of West Bengal
- Cuisine of West Bengal
- Languages of West Bengal
- Monuments in West Bengal
  - Monuments of National Importance in West Bengal
  - State Protected Monuments in West Bengal
- World Heritage Sites in West Bengal

=== Art in West Bengal ===
- Cinema of West Bengal
- Music of West Bengal

=== People of West Bengal ===
- People from West Bengal

=== Religion in West Bengal ===
Religion in West Bengal

- Islam in West Bengal
- Bengali Hindus

=== Sports in West Bengal ===
Sports in West Bengal

- Cricket in West Bengal
  - West Bengal Cricket Association
- Football in West Bengal
  - West Bengal football team

=== Symbols of West Bengal ===
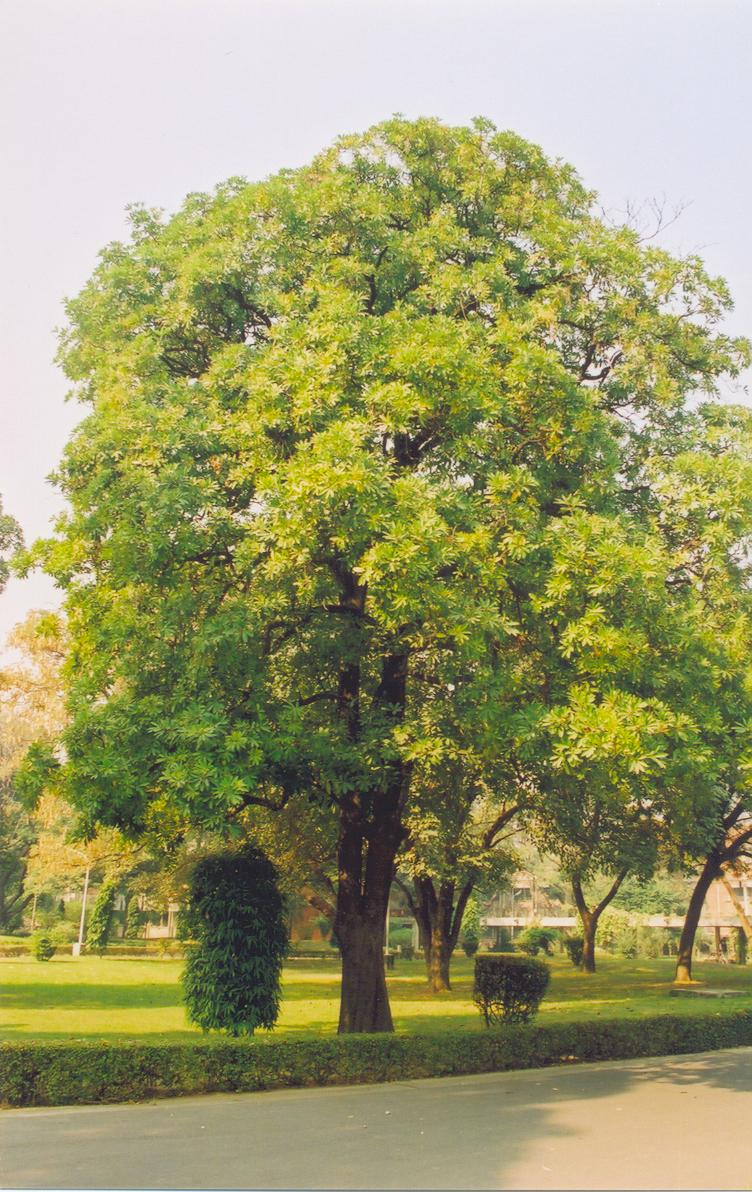
Alstonia scholaris

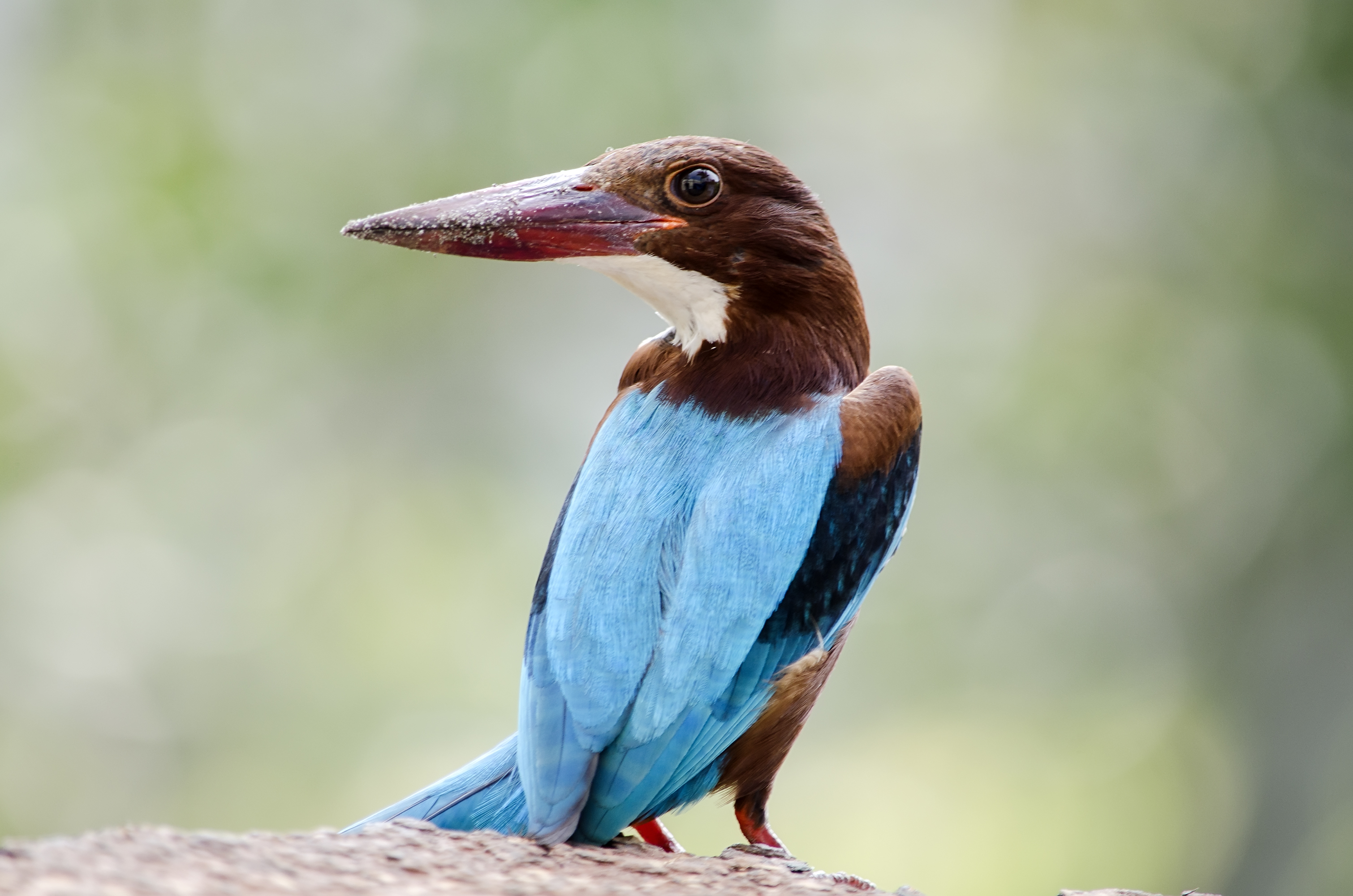
White-throated kingfisher

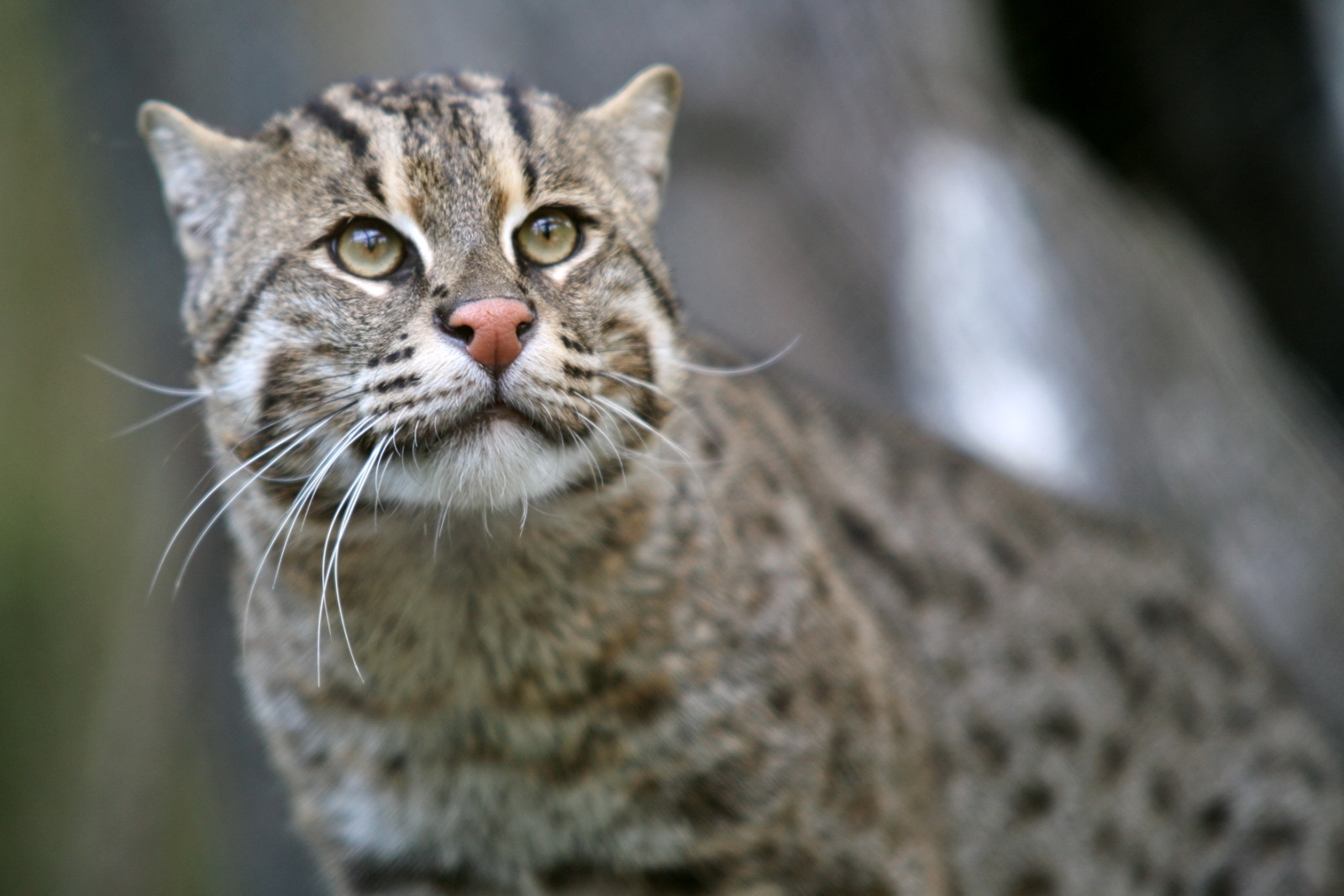
Fishing cat

Symbols of West Bengal

- State animal: Fishing cat
- State bird: White-throated kingfisher
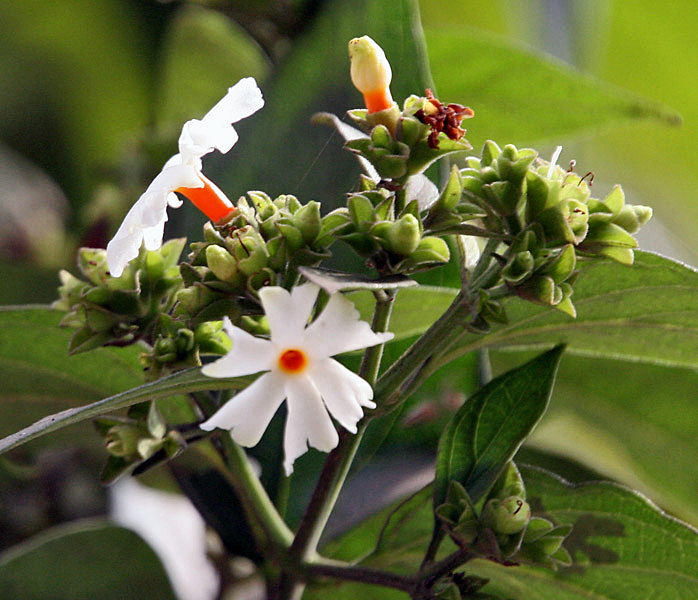
- State flower: Night-flowering jasmine
- State seal: Seal of West Bengal
- State tree: Devil tree
- Union Day: August 18 ( Day of accession to India )

== Economy and infrastructure of West Bengal ==
Economy of West Bengal

- Tourism in West Bengal
- Transport in West Bengal
  - Airports in West Bengal

== Education in West Bengal ==
Education in West Bengal

- Institutions of higher education in West Bengal

== Health in West Bengal ==
Health in West Bengal

== See also ==
- Outline of India
