= Naldugari =

- Village
- Location in West Bengal, India
- Coordinates: 23.207°N 88.768°E
- Country: India
- State: West Bengal
- District: North 24 Parganas

Government
  - Type: Grampanchayet
  - Body: Pranchayet Pradhan
  - MLA: Dulal Ch Bar
- Elevation: 11 m (36 ft)

Languages
  - Official: Bengali, English
- Time zone: UTC+5:30 (IST)
- PIN: 743297
- Telephone/STD code: 03215
- Lok Sabha constituency: Bongaon
- Vidhan Sabha constituency: Bagdah
- Website: north24parganas.nic.in

Naldugari is a village in Bagdah block in Bangaon subdivision of North 24 Parganas district in the Indian state of West Bengal.

== Transport ==
The nearest railway stations are Ranaghat railway station on the Sealdah - Krishnanagar rail route and Bangaon railway station (32 km away) on the Sealdah - Bangaon line. Bus is available towards Bangaon, Chakdaha and Ranaghat from Satberia near the village. The nearest airport is at Dumdum, about 110 km away.

== Attractions ==
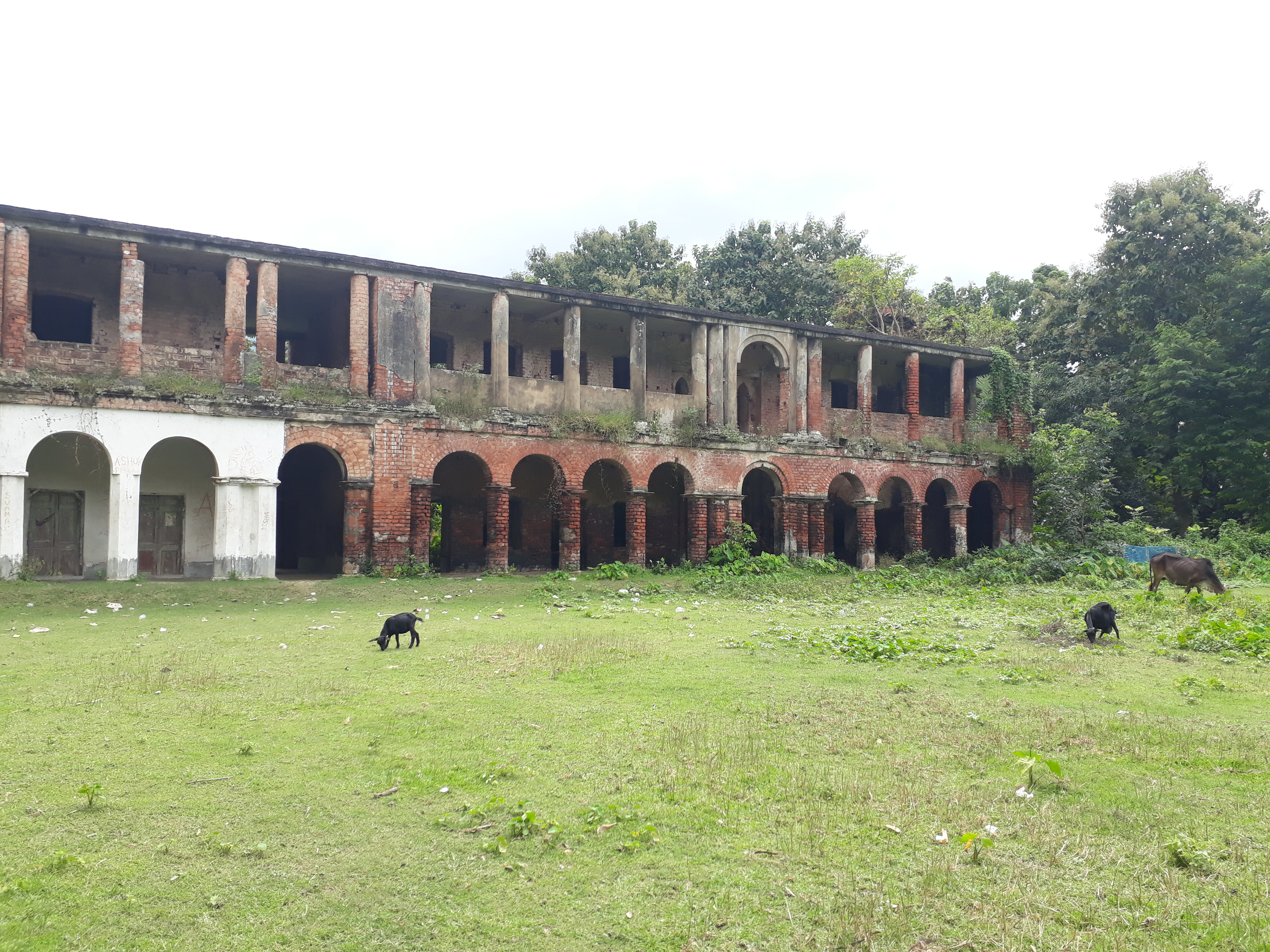
Mongolganj Indigo Kuthi at Naldugari

- Bibhutibhushan Wildlife Sanctuary (Parmadan Forest) (3.5 km).
- Mongolganj Indigo Kuthi (Back Side Of Parmadan Forest)
- Ichamati River - Place of birth of great Bengali author Shri Bibhutibhusan Bandopaddhyay at Chalki Barakpur (18 km)
- Bangladesh–India border at Petrapole near Bangaon - 30 km
