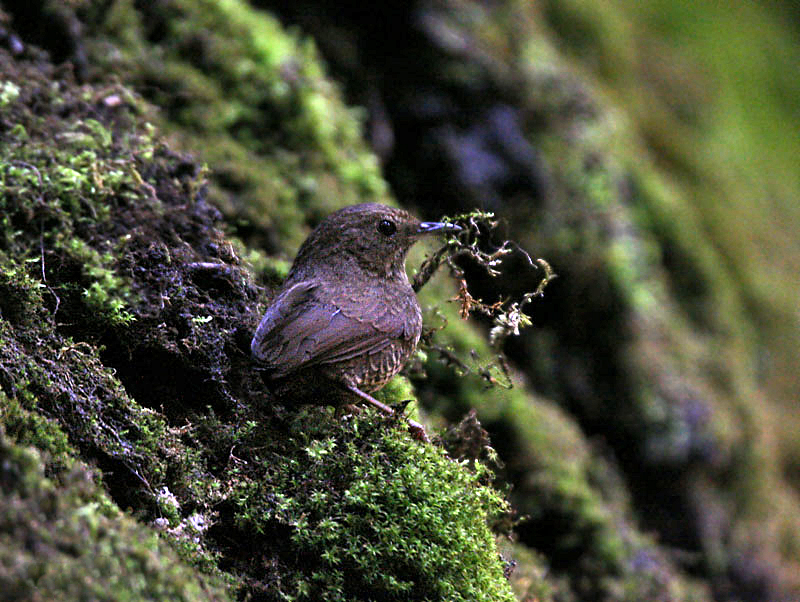
- Scaly-breasted wren-babbler (Pnoepyga albiventer)

Scientific classification
- Kingdom: Animalia
- Phylum: Chordata
- Class: Aves
- Order: Passeriformes
- Parvorder: Sylviida
- Family: Pnoepygidae; Gelang et al., 2009
- Genus: Pnoepyga; Hodgson, 1844

Type species
- Tesia albiventer Hodgson, 1837

= Pnoepyga =

Genus of birds

Pnoepyga is a genus of passerines endemic to southern and southeastern Asia. Its members are known as cupwings or wren-babblers. The genus contains four species. The genus has long been placed in the babbler family Timaliidae. A 2009 study of the DNA of the families Timaliidae and the Old World warblers (Sylviidae) found no support for the placement of the genus in either family, prompting the authors to erect a new monogeneric family, the Pnoepygidae.

This genus of diminutive passerines has a mostly montane distribution in South and Southeast Asia. The scaly-breasted cupwing is found in the mountainous areas of north India eastwards to southern China and northern Vietnam. The Taiwan cupwing is endemic to Taiwan, and similarly the Nepal cupwing has a restricted distribution, mostly occurring in Nepal (and also slightly into India). The most widespread species is the pygmy cupwing, which occurs from China and India south through Southeast Asia into the Malay Peninsula and Indonesia as far as Flores and Timor.

== Species ==
The genus contains the following four species:

Image	Common name	Scientific name	Distribution
	Scaly-breasted cupwing or scaly-breasted wren-babbler	Pnoepyga albiventer (Hodgson, 1837)	southern and eastern Asia from the Himalayas to Indochina.
	Taiwan cupwing or Taiwan wren-babbler	Pnoepyga formosana Ingram, W, 1909	Taiwan
	Nepal cupwing or Nepal wren-babbler	Pnoepyga immaculata Martens, J & Eck, 1991	Uttarakhand and Nepal.
	Pygmy cupwing or pygmy wren-babbler	Pnoepyga pusilla Hodgson, 1845	Himalayas to the Lesser Sunda Islands.
