= Narendrapur Wildlife Sanctuary =

Wildlife sanctuary in India

Coordinates: 22.4295°N 88.4007°E

Narendrapur Wildlife Sanctuary in South 24 Parganas District, West Bengal is an Orchard Plantation and constitutes only 17 acres (69,000 m^{2}) and is rich in smaller birds, specially paradise flycatcher, oriole, etc.
