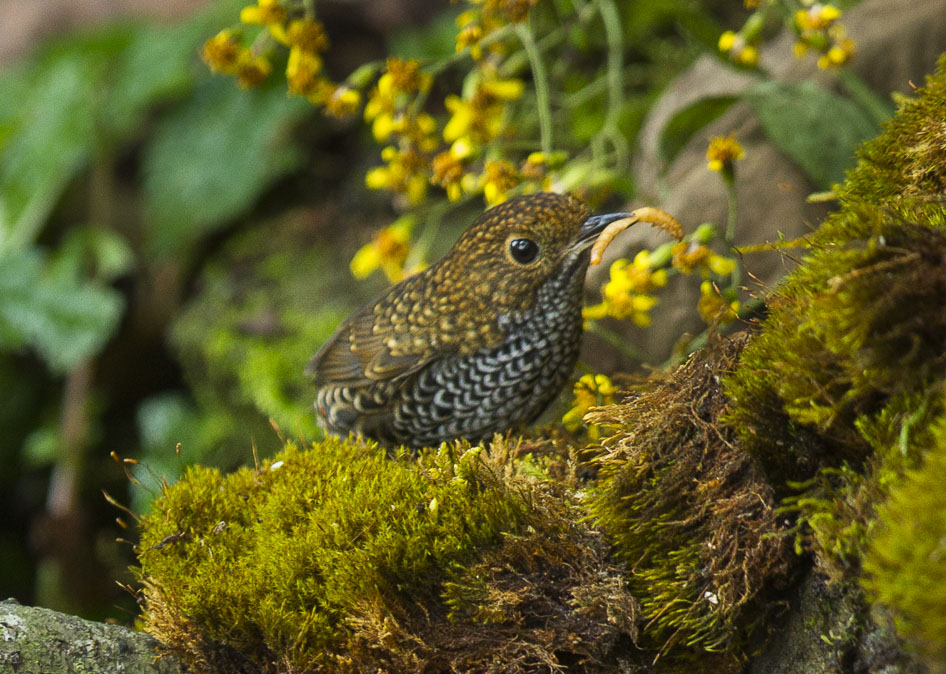

Conservation status
- Least Concern (IUCN 3.1)

Scientific classification
- Kingdom: Animalia
- Phylum: Chordata
- Class: Aves
- Order: Passeriformes
- Family: Pnoepygidae
- Genus: Pnoepyga
- Species: P. formosana

Binomial name
- Pnoepyga formosana Ingram, C, 1909
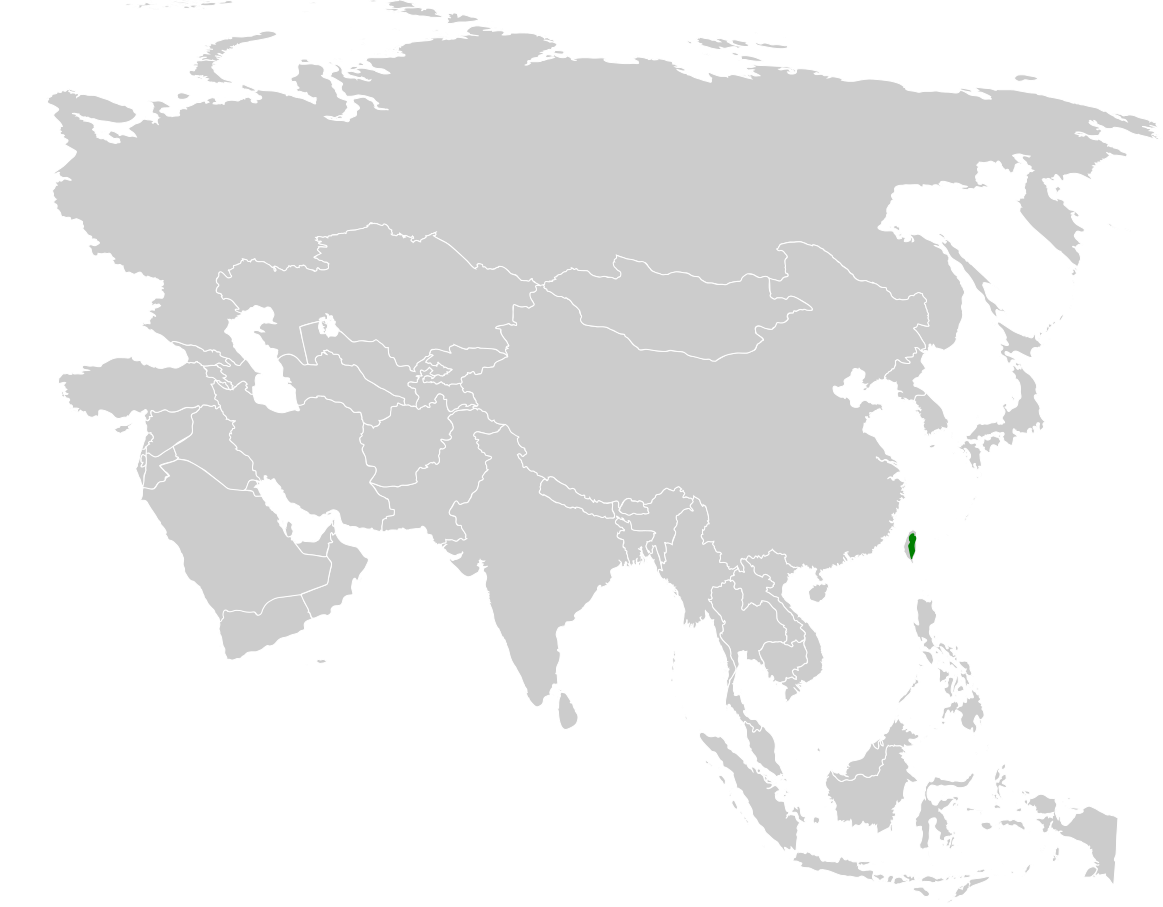

Synonyms
- Pnoepyga albiventer formosana

= Taiwan cupwing =

Species of bird

The Taiwan cupwing (Pnoepyga formosana), also known as Taiwan wren-babbler, is a species of passerine bird in the family Pnoepygidae. The species is endemic to the island of Taiwan. It was treated for a long time as a subspecies of the scaly-breasted cupwing.

== Description ==
The bird is 8 to 9 cm long. The bird seems to be tailless, is olive-brown from above and the plumage has the pattern of fish scales on the chest. The Taiwan wren-babbler is very similar to the scaly-breasted cupwing, with pale-colored scales on an almost black surface. The wings and legs are shorter and the bird is more reddish-brown in color.
