= Jore Pokhri Wildlife Sanctuary =

Protected area in West Bengal, India

- IUCN category IV (habitat/species management area)
- Location within West Bengal Location within India
- Interactive map of Jore Pokhri Wildlife Sanctuary
- Location: Dalkajhar Forest, Darjeeling district, West Bengal, India
- Nearest city: Darjeeling
- Coordinates: 26.748617°N 88.256913°E
- Area: 2 square kilometres (0.77 sq mi)
- Established: 1964

Jore Pokhri Wildlife Sanctuary is located in Darjeeling District, West Bengal. Situated at an elevation of about 2 km, it is the habitat of some high-altitude animals like Himalayan Salamander (Tylototriton verrucosus), locally known as 'Gora'. Many animals and birds are found there. Jore Pokhari is a small village on a hilltop which is almost 20 kilometers away from Darjeeling town. The main feature of Jore Pokhri is the twin lakes after which the place is named. Jore means two in Nepali and Pokhri means Lake. The boundary of one lake is surrounded with seating arrangements for visitors, and there is a huge model of snake in the middle of the lake.

There are several temples in the area as well as rare Himalayan Salamanders, swans and monkeys. Once the Salamanders were considered totally extinct, but examples were found in Jore Pokhri in 1964.

Jore Pokhri, also known as Pashupati, is 18 kilometers away from the South-East border of Nepal.
