= Sports in West Bengal =

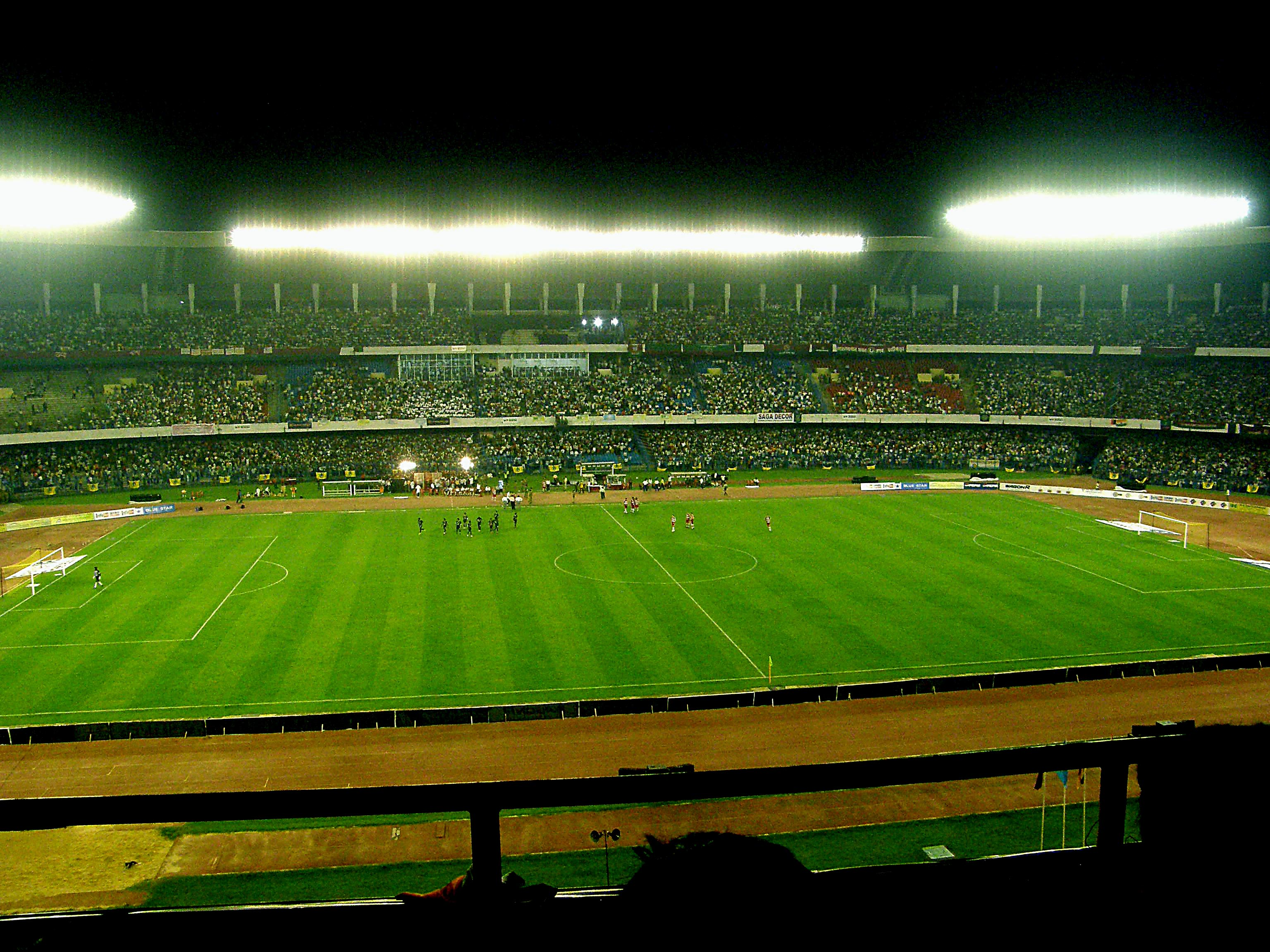
Salt Lake Stadium – Yuva Bharati Krirangan, Kolkata

Sports in West Bengal has its own importance. Cricket and football are the most popular sports in the Indian state of West Bengal.

== Football ==
Unlike in other Indian states where cricket is considered as the most popular game with some exceptions, football is the most popular game in West Bengal. It can be considered as the football hub of India and houses many clubs like East Bengal, Mohun Bagan and Mohammedan Sporting Club.

== Cricket ==
As mostly in India, cricket is immensely popular among the masses of west Bengal. It houses the Eden Gardens stadium which is the largest cricket stadium in India. Eden gardens can house more than 100,000 people and is one of the only two 100,000-seat cricket amphitheaters in the world. Eden gardens is also the home for the East Zone and Bengal Cricket team. It also houses the Indian Premier League team Kolkata Knight Riders bought by Shah Rukh Khan which uses Eden gardens as its home turf. Calcutta Cricket and Football Club is the second-oldest cricket club in the world.

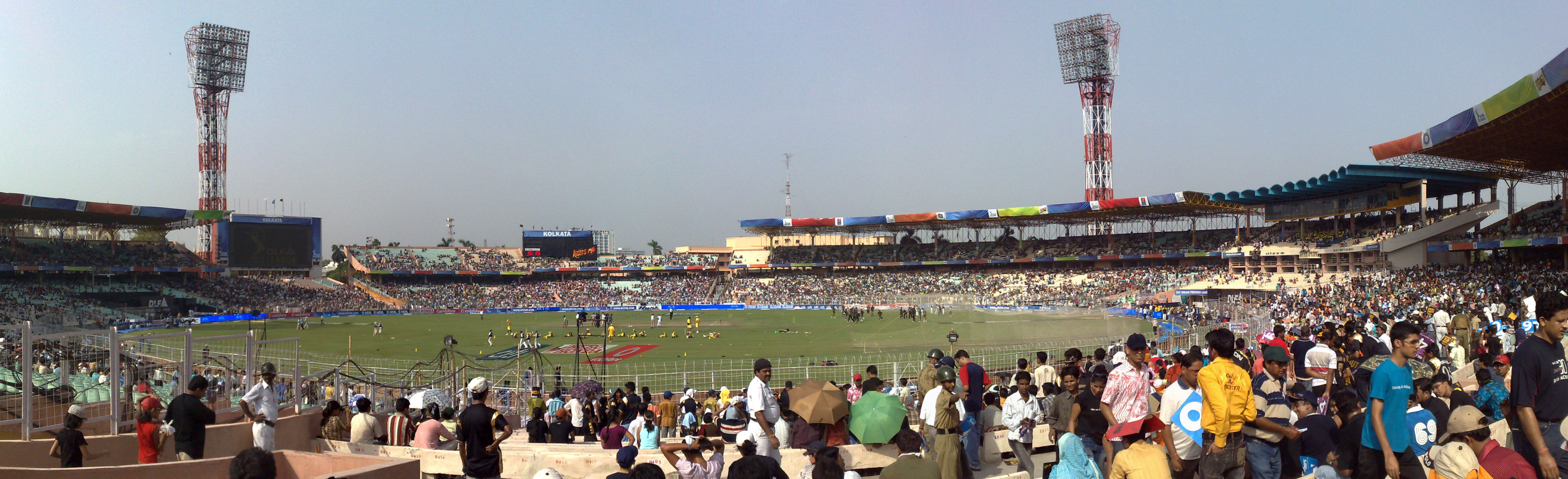
Panoramic view of the Eden Gardens Stadium during IPL 2008

== Other games ==
Indian sports like kho kho and kabaddi are also popular among the masses here.

=== Polo ===
The oldest polo club of the world, Calcutta Polo Club is also present here.

=== Golf ===
Outside Great Britain the Royal Calcutta Golf Club is the oldest of its kind.

== Stadiums ==
- Eden Gardens is used mainly for cricket.
- Vivekananda Yuba Bharati Krirangan, a multi-use stadium, is the world's second highest-capacity football stadium.
- Kishore Bharati Krirangan, a multi-purpose stadium, used mainly for football.
- Kanchenjunga Stadium, a multi-purpose stadium in Siliguri, West Bengal.
- Durgapur, Siliguri and Kharagpur also hold various national and international sports events.

== Notable persons ==
- Dola Banerjee - archer
- Pradip Kumar Banerjee - footballer
- Rahul Banerjee - archer
- Swapna Barman - gold medal winner of heptathlon in 2018 Asian Games in Jakarta, Indonesia
- Dibyendu Barua - chess grand master
- Sourav Ganguly - former Indian national cricket captain
- Chuni Goswami - footballer
- Sailen Manna - footballer
- Leander Paes - Olympic tennis bronze medallist
- Pankaj Roy - former Indian cricketer
- Mohammed Ali Qamar - the first Indian to win a gold medal in the discipline of boxing in the Commonwealth Games
- Wriddhiman Saha - Indian cricketer
- Richa Ghosh - Indian cricketer
- Mihir Sen - swimmer
- Masudur Rahman Baidya - swimmer
- Jyotirmoyee Sikdar - athlete and winner of gold medals at the Asian Games
- Manoj Tiwary - Indian cricketer
- Jhulan Goswami - former captain of India national women's cricket team
- Syed Rahim Nabi - former Indian national team footballer
- Saurav Ghosal - Squash player
- Sukalyan Ghosh Dastidar - former Indian national team footballer
- Achinta Sheuli - Indian Weightlifter
- Mehtab Hossain - former footballer

== See also ==
- Bengali traditional games
