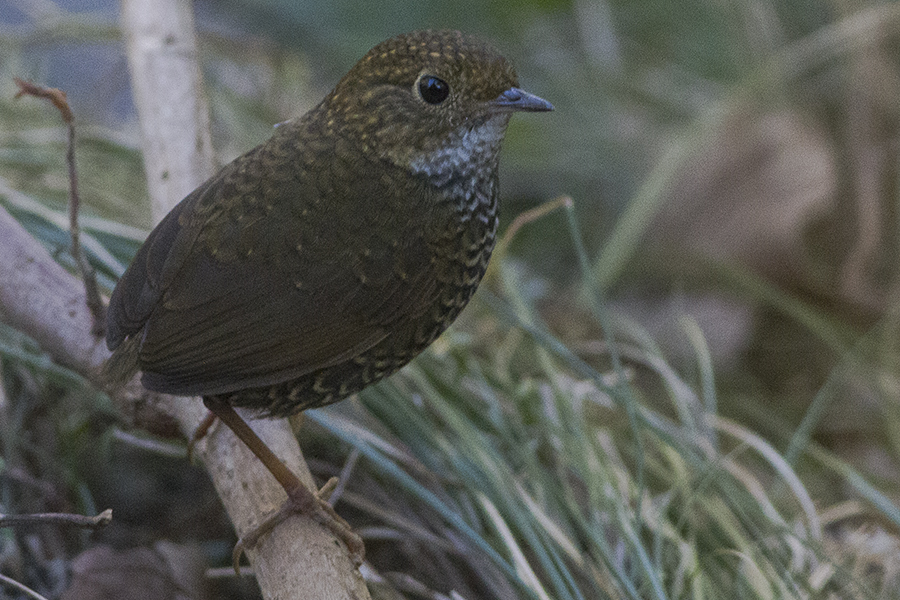
- From Kedarnath Musk Deer Sanctuary in Uttarakhand, India.

Conservation status
- Least Concern (IUCN 3.1)

Scientific classification
- Kingdom: Animalia
- Phylum: Chordata
- Class: Aves
- Order: Passeriformes
- Family: Pnoepygidae
- Genus: Pnoepyga
- Species: P. albiventer

Binomial name
- Pnoepyga albiventer (Hodgson, 1837)
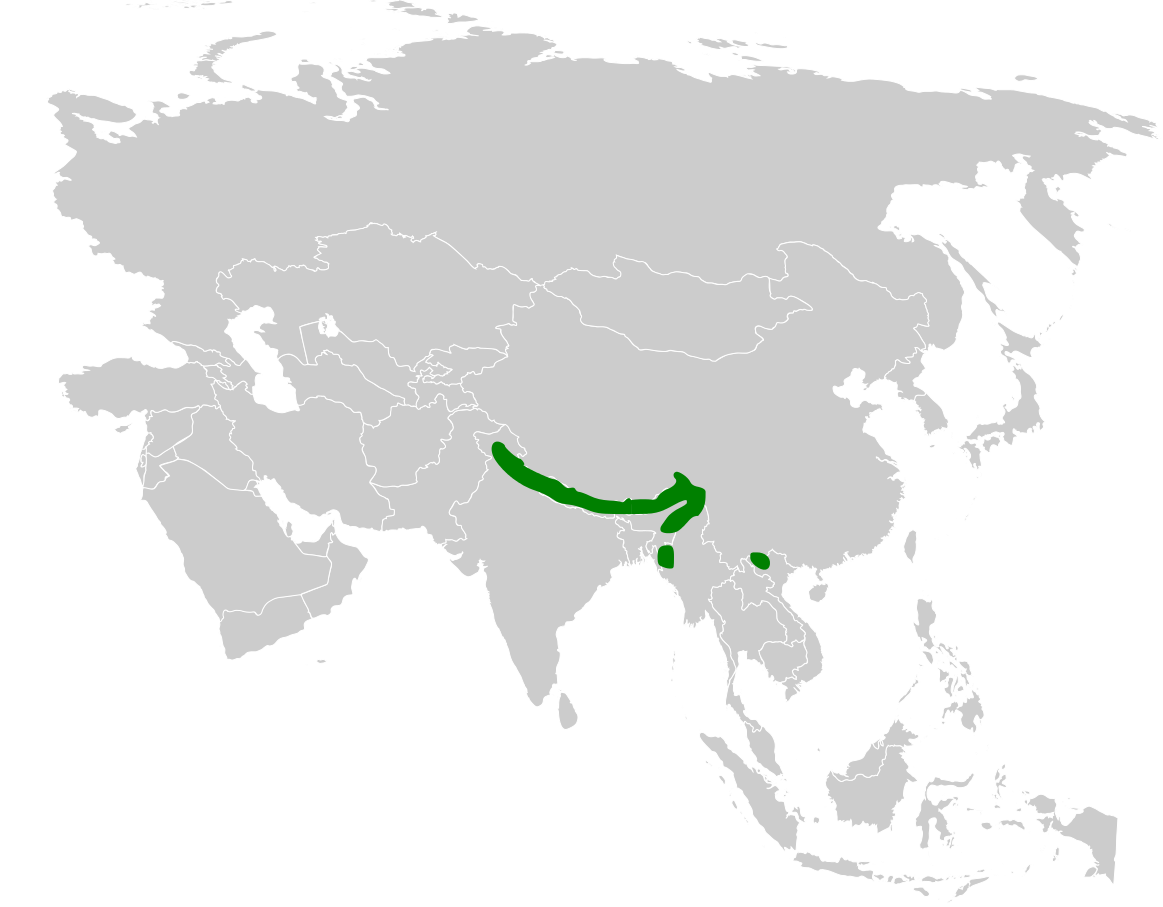

= Scaly-breasted cupwing =

Species of bird

The scaly-breasted cupwing or scaly-breasted wren-babbler (Pnoepyga albiventer) is a species of bird in the Pnoepyga wren-babblers family, Pnoepygidae. It is found in southern and eastern Asia from the Himalayas to Indochina.

== Taxonomy and systematics ==
The Taiwan cupwing was once treated as a subspecies of the scaly-breasted cupwing. The Chinese cupwing has been merged into this species.

== Description ==
The scaly-breasted cupwing is a very small babbler with almost no tail, around 9 cm long and weighing between 19 and 23 g. The plumage is olive on the back and lightly scalloped on the chest.

== Distribution and habitat ==
The natural habitat of the scaly-breasted cupwing is subtropical moist montane forest. Within that habitat it is usually found near water. The species undertakes some altitudinal migration, moving closer to sea level during the winter over some of its range.

== Gallery ==
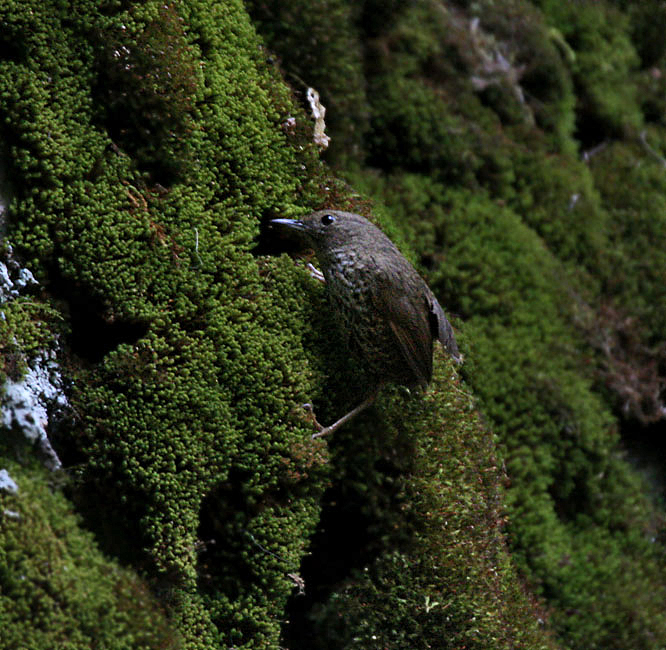
in Kullu - Manali District of Himachal Pradesh, India

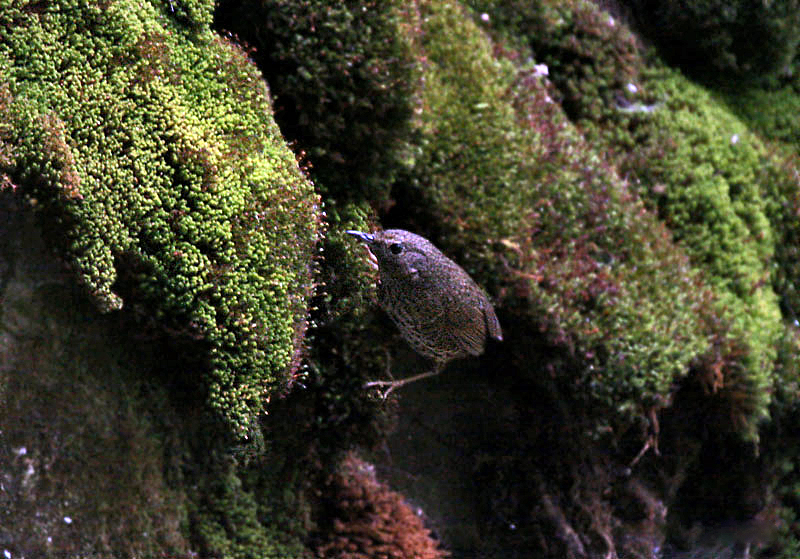
in Kullu - Manali District of Himachal Pradesh, India

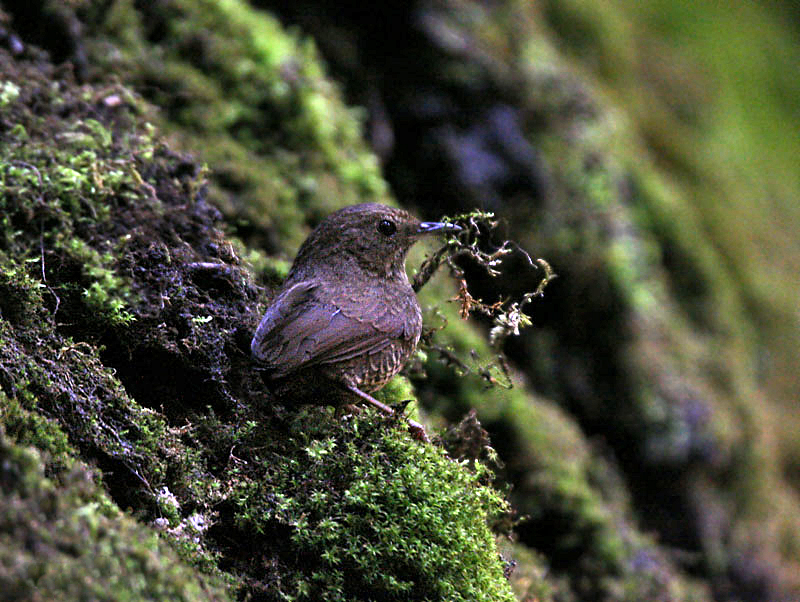
in Kullu - Manali District of Himachal Pradesh, India
