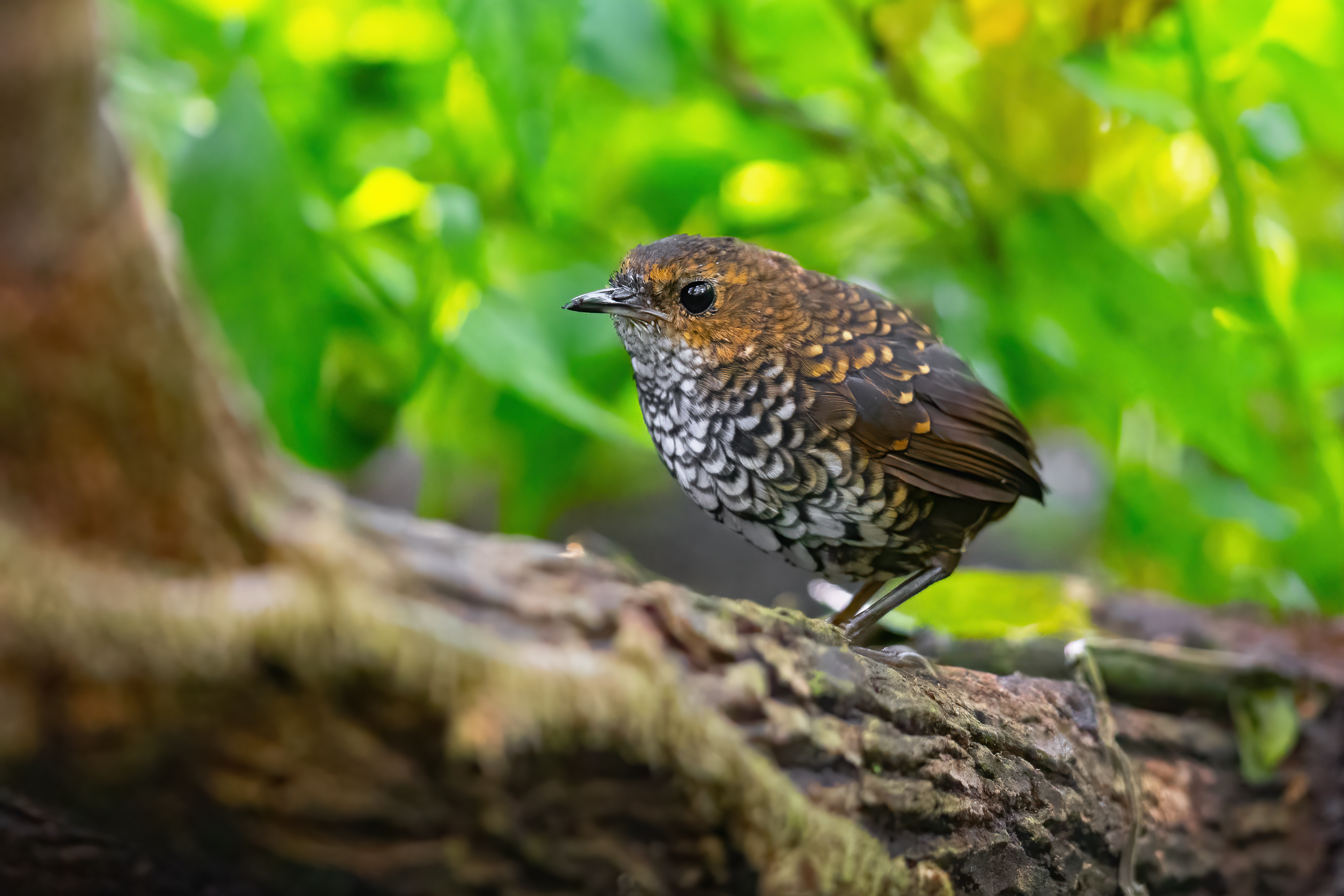
- From East Java, Indonesia

Conservation status
- Least Concern (IUCN 3.1)

Scientific classification
- Kingdom: Animalia
- Phylum: Chordata
- Class: Aves
- Order: Passeriformes
- Family: Pnoepygidae
- Genus: Pnoepyga
- Species: P. pusilla

Binomial name
- Pnoepyga pusilla Hodgson, 1845
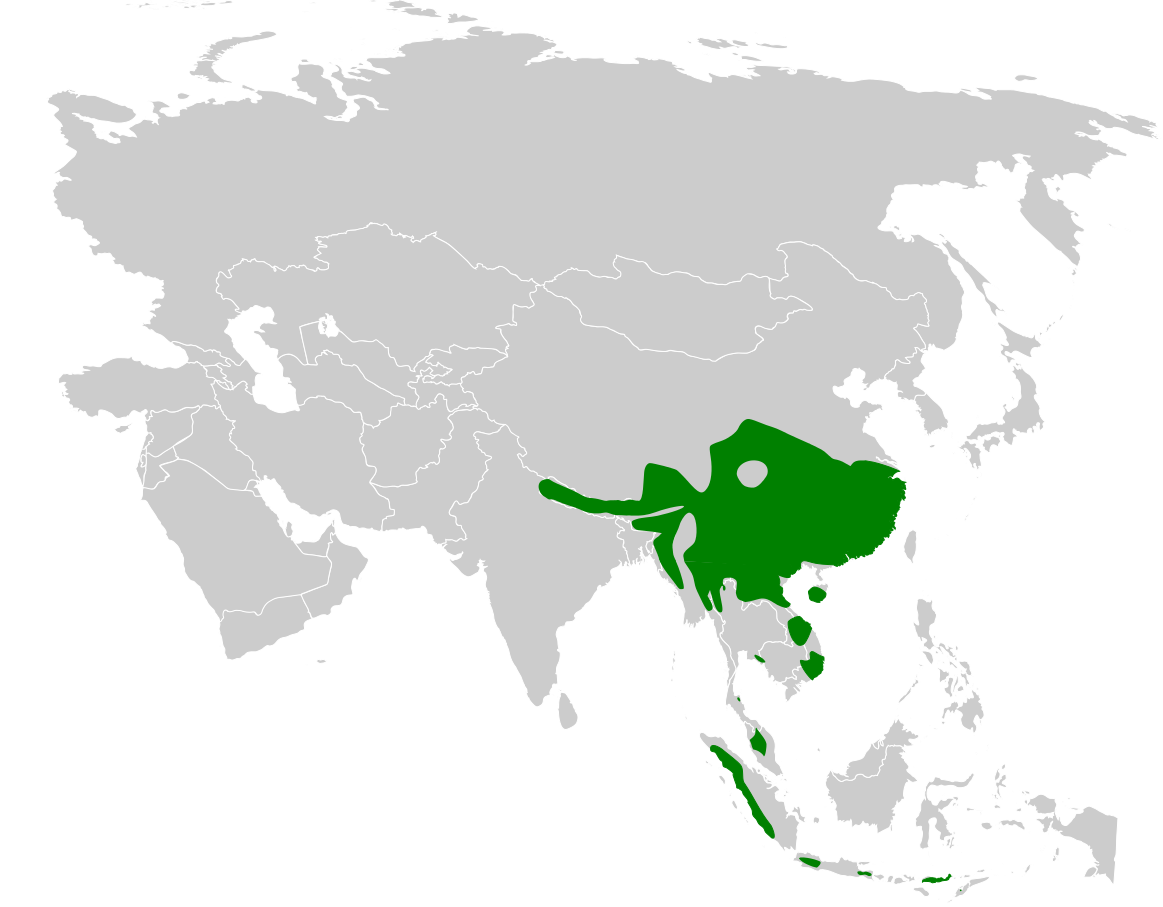

= Pygmy cupwing =

Species of bird

The pygmy cupwing (Pnoepyga pusilla) or pygmy wren-babbler, is a species of bird in the Pnoepyga wren-babblers family, Pnoepygidae. It is found in southern and eastern Asia from the Himalayas to the Lesser Sunda Islands. Its natural habitats are subtropical or tropical moist lowland forest and subtropical or tropical moist montane forest.
