= Bibhutibhushan Wildlife Sanctuary =

Animal sanctuary in West Bengal, India

- Pārmādana Forest
- IUCN category IV (habitat/species management area)
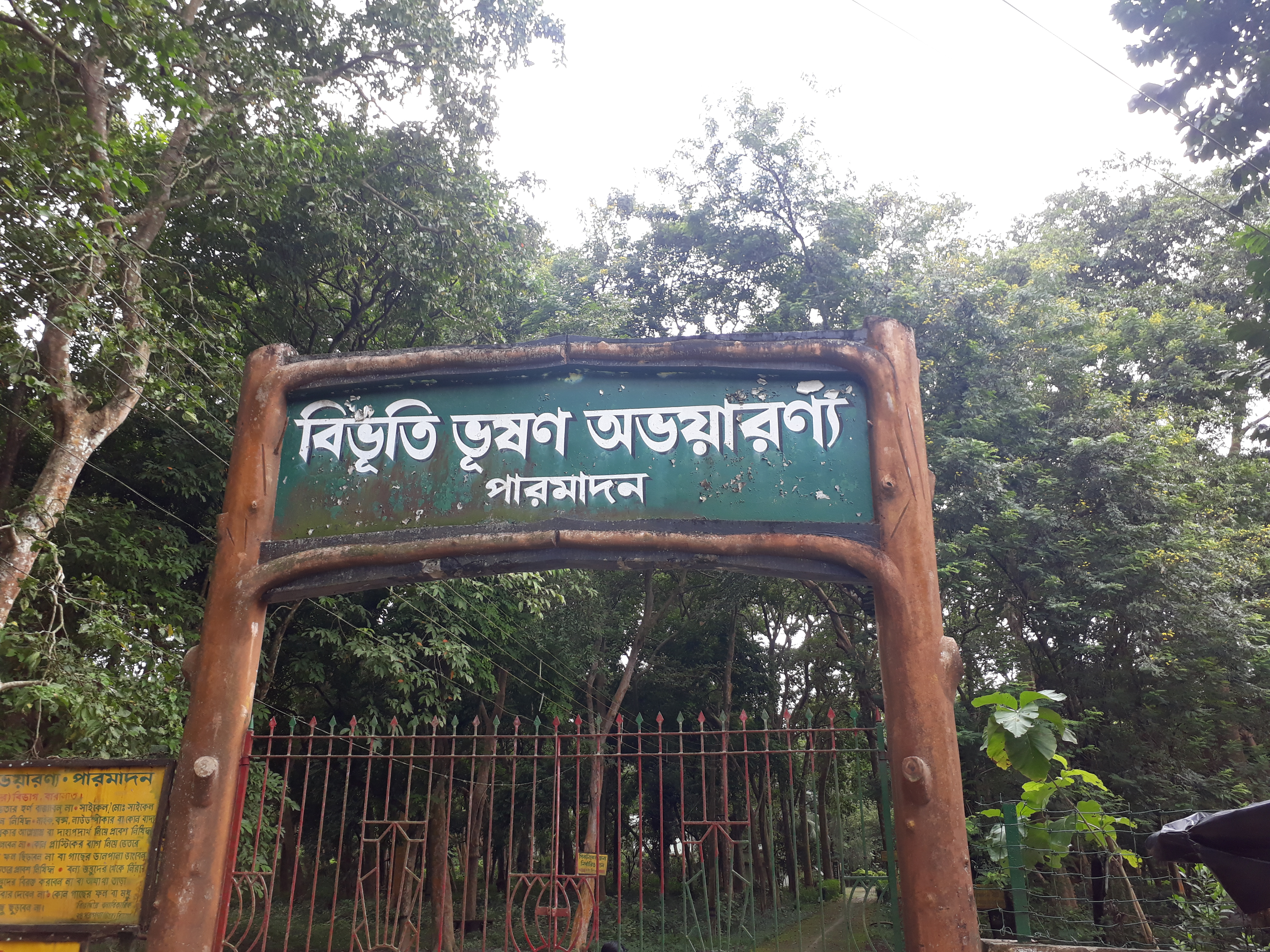

- Location within India
- Interactive map of Bibhutibhushan Wildlife Sanctuary
- Location: North 24 Parganas district, West Bengal, India
- Nearest city: Bongaon
- Coordinates: 23.1861775°N 88.7620868°E
- Area: 0.68 square kilometres (0.26 sq mi)
- Established: 1980

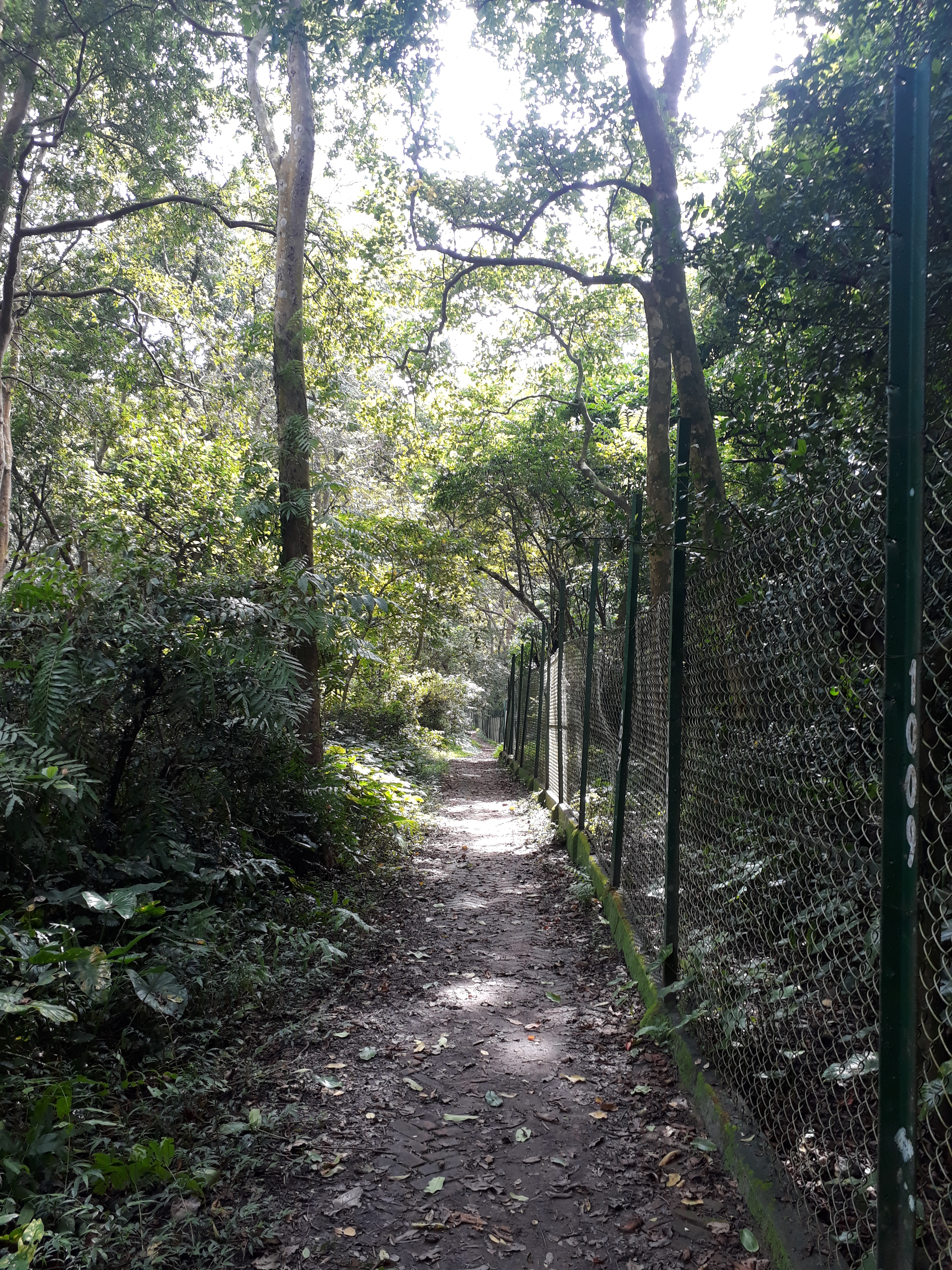
Inside the Parmadan forest

Bibhutibhusan Wildlife Sanctuary (formerly Parmadan Forest) is an animal sanctuary in North 24 Parganas district in the Indian state of West Bengal. The forest is located about 100 km from Kolkata and 25 km from Bongaon.

Situated on the banks of the Ichamati River covering an area of 0.68 km^{2} it has more than 200 deer, birds, rabbit and many langurs. It also has a children's park, a small zoo and a tourist lodge of the forest department. The nearest bus stop is at Naldugari on the 92 bus route (Bongaon-Helencha-Duttafulia Route).

== History ==
The sanctuary began in 1964 when 14 chital were released in the forest. In 1980, it was named "Parmadan" when it was declared a wildlife sanctuary. In 1995 it acquired its present name after the famous Bengali author Bibhutibhushan Bandyopadhyay who was a great nature lover.

== Location ==
The forest is located about 100 km from Kolkata and 25 km from Bongaon.

== Wildlife ==
It has more than 200 deer, birds, rabbit and many langurs and monkeys.
